= Bridge =

Structure built to span physical obstacles

A bridge is a structure designed to span an obstacle, such as a river or railway, allowing vehicles, pedestrians, and other loads to pass across. Most bridges consist of a flat deck, supported by beams, arches, or cables. These structures rest on a foundation that is carefully designed to transfer the weight of the bridge to the subsoil without settling.

Bridges can be constructed in a wide variety of forms, determined by the location, intended purpose, and available construction technologies. Simple bridge structures include beam bridges made from logs, and suspension bridges made of ropes or vines. The Romans and ancient Chinese built major arch bridges of timber, stone, and brick. During the Renaissance, advances in science and engineering led to wider bridge spans and more elegant designs. Concrete was perfected in the early 19th century, and arch bridges are now built primarily of concrete or steel.

With the Industrial Revolution came mass-produced steel, which enabled the creation of more complex forms – including truss and cantilever bridges – that permitted bridges to cross wide rivers or deep valleys. The longest spans use suspension or cable-stayed designs, both of which rely on high-strength steel cables to support the deck. Over time, the maximum achievable span of bridges has steadily increased, reaching 2 kilometers (1.2 miles) in 2022. Other bridge forms include multi-span viaducts, which can cross wide valleys; trestles, a common design for carrying heavy trains; and movable bridges including drawbridges and swing bridges.

The design of a bridge must satisfy many requirements, namely connecting to a transportation network, providing adequate clearances, and safely transporting its users. A bridge must be strong enough to support its own weight as well as the weight of the traffic passing over it. It must also tolerate violent, hard-to-predict stresses imposed by the environment, including winds, floods, and earthquakes. To meet all these goals, bridge engineers typically use limit state design processes and the finite element method.

Many bridges are admired for their beauty, and some spectacular bridges serve as iconic landmarks that provide a sense of pride and identity for the local community. In art and literature, bridges are frequently used as metaphors to represent connection or transition. Bridges can create beneficial impacts on a community, including shorter transport times and increased gross domestic product; and also negative effects such as increased pollution and contributions to global warming.

== History ==
=== Antiquity ===
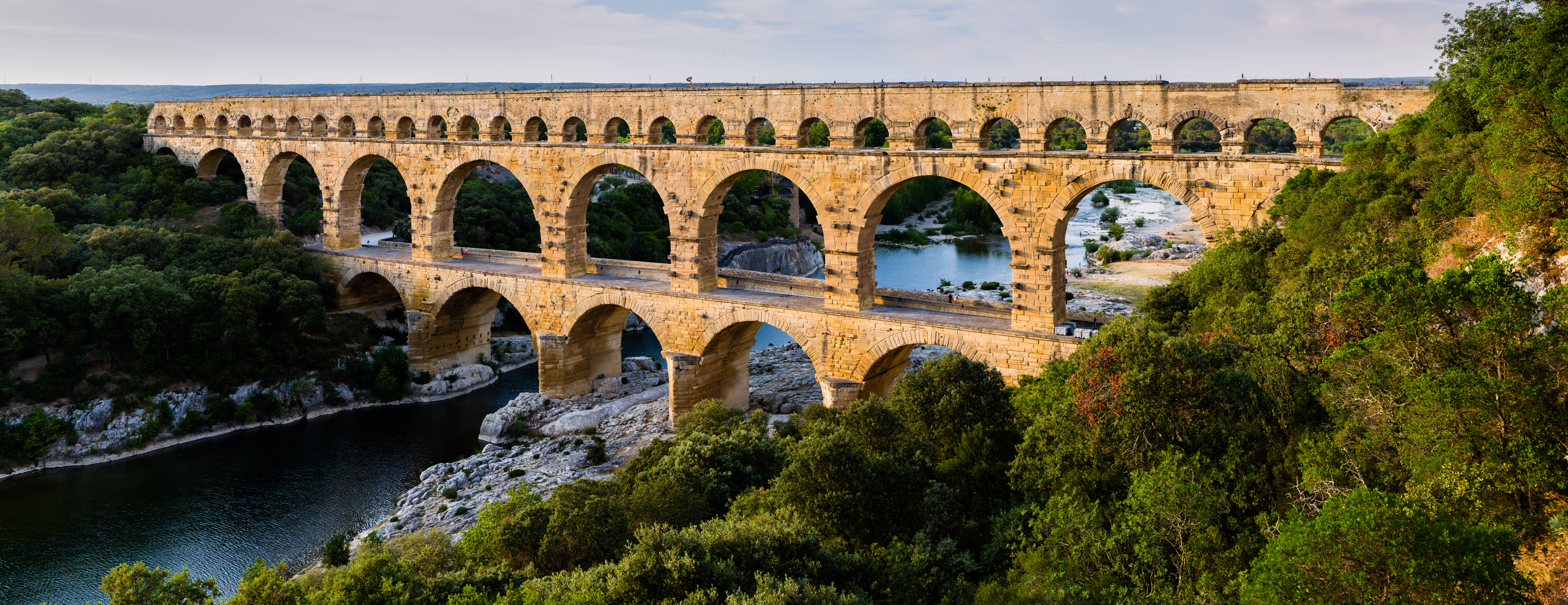
The Pont du Gard aqueduct in France was built by the Roman Empire c. 40–60 AD.

The earliest forms of bridges were simple structures for crossing wetlands and creeks, consisting of wooden boardwalks or logs. (Note: Examples of early bridges include the Sweet Track and the Post Track in England, approximately 6,000 years old.) Pilings – which are critical elements of bridge construction – were used in Switzerland around 4,000 BC to support stilt houses built over water. Several corbel arch bridges were built c. 13th century BC by the Mycenaean Greece culture, including the Arkadiko Bridge, which is still in existence. In the 7th century BC, Assyrian king Sennacherib constructed stone aqueducts to carry water near the city of Nineveh; one of the aqueducts crossed a small valley at Jerwan with five corbelled arches, and was 280 meters (920 ft) long and 20 meters (66 ft) wide. In Babylonia in 626 BC, a bridge across the Euphrates was built with an estimated length of 120 to 200 meters (390 to 660 ft). In India, the Arthashastra treatise by Kautilya mentions the construction of bridges and dams. Ancient China has an extensive history of bridge construction, including cantilever bridges, rope bridges, and bridges built across floating boats.

The ancient Romans built many durable bridges using advanced engineering techniques. Many Roman aqueducts – some still standing today – used a semicircular arch style. Examples include the Alcántara Bridge in Spain and the Pont du Gard in France. The Romans used cement as a construction material, which could be mixed with small rocks to form concrete, or mixed with sand to form mortar to join bricks or stones. Some Roman cements, particularly those containing volcanic ash, were waterproof. (Note: The volcanic ash, called pozzolana, was used to create a variety of concrete called Roman concrete.) The enormous timber and stone Trajan's Bridge (c. 105 AD) crossed the Danube river and was over 900 meters (3,000 ft) long.

=== 300 to 1400 ===
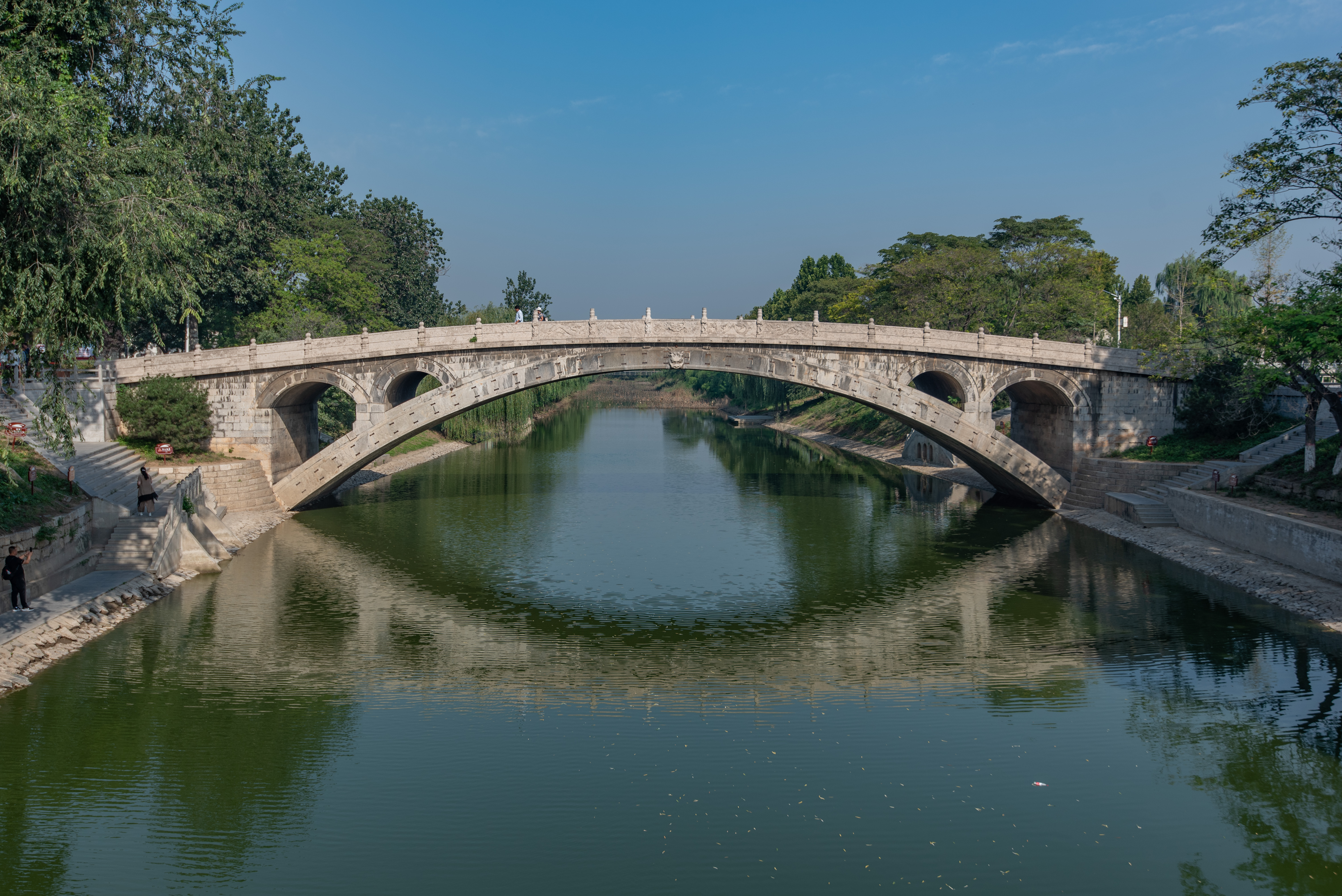
The Anji Bridge, which uses a shallow segmental arch, was built in China c. 600 AD.

The oldest surviving stone bridge in China is the Anji Bridge, built from 595 to 605 AD during the Sui dynasty. This bridge is also historically significant as it is the world's oldest open-spandrel stone segmental arch bridge. Rope bridges, a simple type of suspension bridge, were used by the Inca civilization in the Andes mountains of South America prior to European colonization in the 16th century.

In Medieval Europe, bridge design capabilities declined after the fall of Rome, but revived in the High Middle Ages in France, England, and Italy with the construction of bridges like the Pont d'Avignon, bridges of the Durance river, and the Old London Bridge. Surviving examples include the Ponte Vecchio in Florence, the Old Exe Bridge, and the Monnow Bridge in Wales.

=== 1400 to 1750 ===
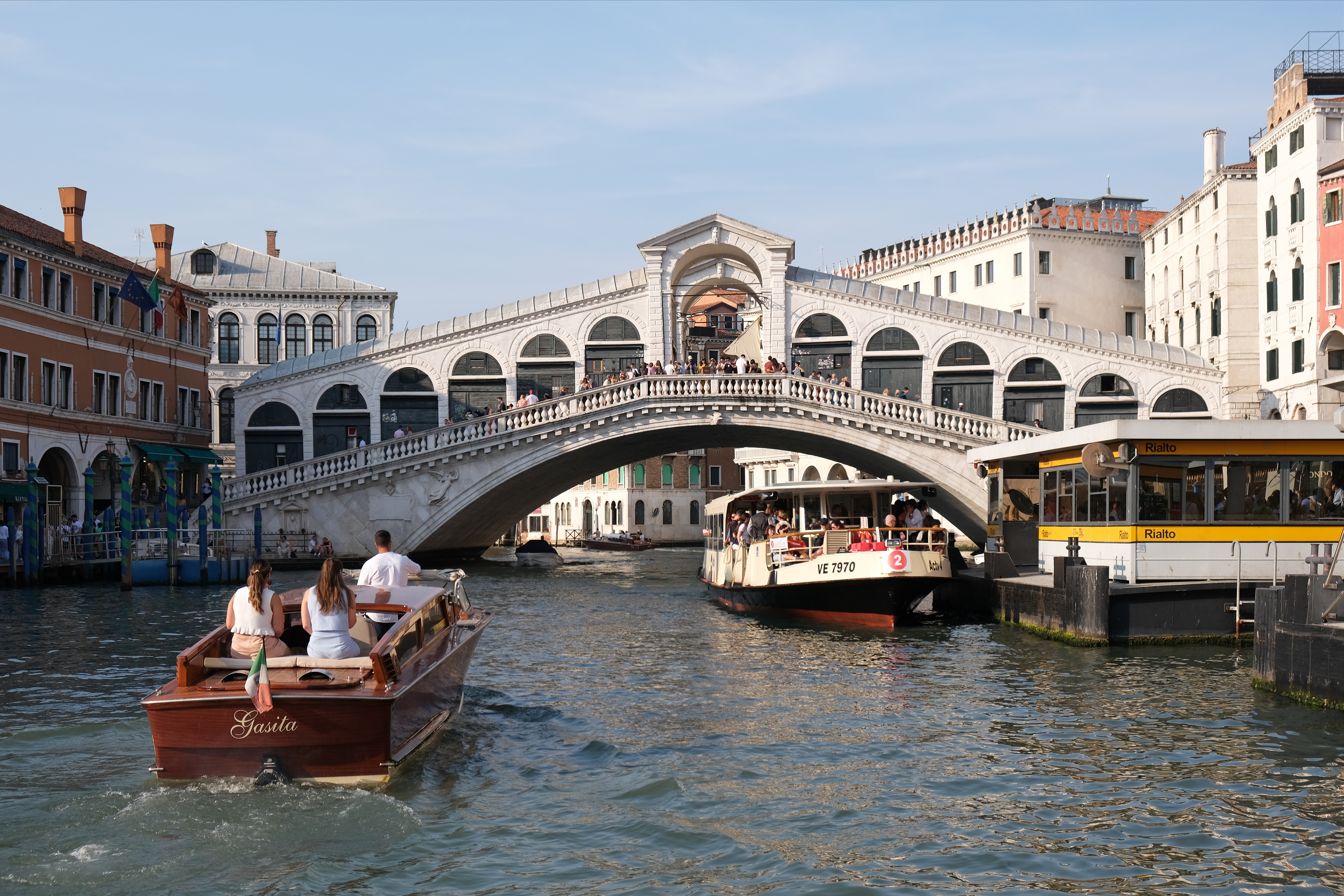
The Rialto Bridge, built in 1591, crosses the Grand Canal in Venice.

In 15th- and 16th-century Europe, the Renaissance brought a new emphasis on science and engineering. Figures such as Galileo Galilei, Fausto Veranzio, and Andrea Palladio (author of I quattro libri dell'architettura) wrote treatises that applied a rigorous, analytic approach to architecture and building. Their innovations included truss bridges and stone segmental arches, resulting in Florence's Ponte Santa Trinita, the Rialto Bridge in Venice, and Paris's Pont Neuf. Military and commercial bridges were constructed in India by the Mughal administration. The Asante Empire in Africa built bridges over streams and rivers using tree trunks and beams.

=== 1750 to 1900 ===
In the late 18th century, the design of arch bridges was revolutionized in Europe by Jean-Rodolphe Perronet and John Rennie. They designed arches that were flatter than semicircular Roman arches, which yielded faster construction times, better water flow under the bridge, and slimmer piers. These designs were used for the Pont de la Concorde and New London Bridge.

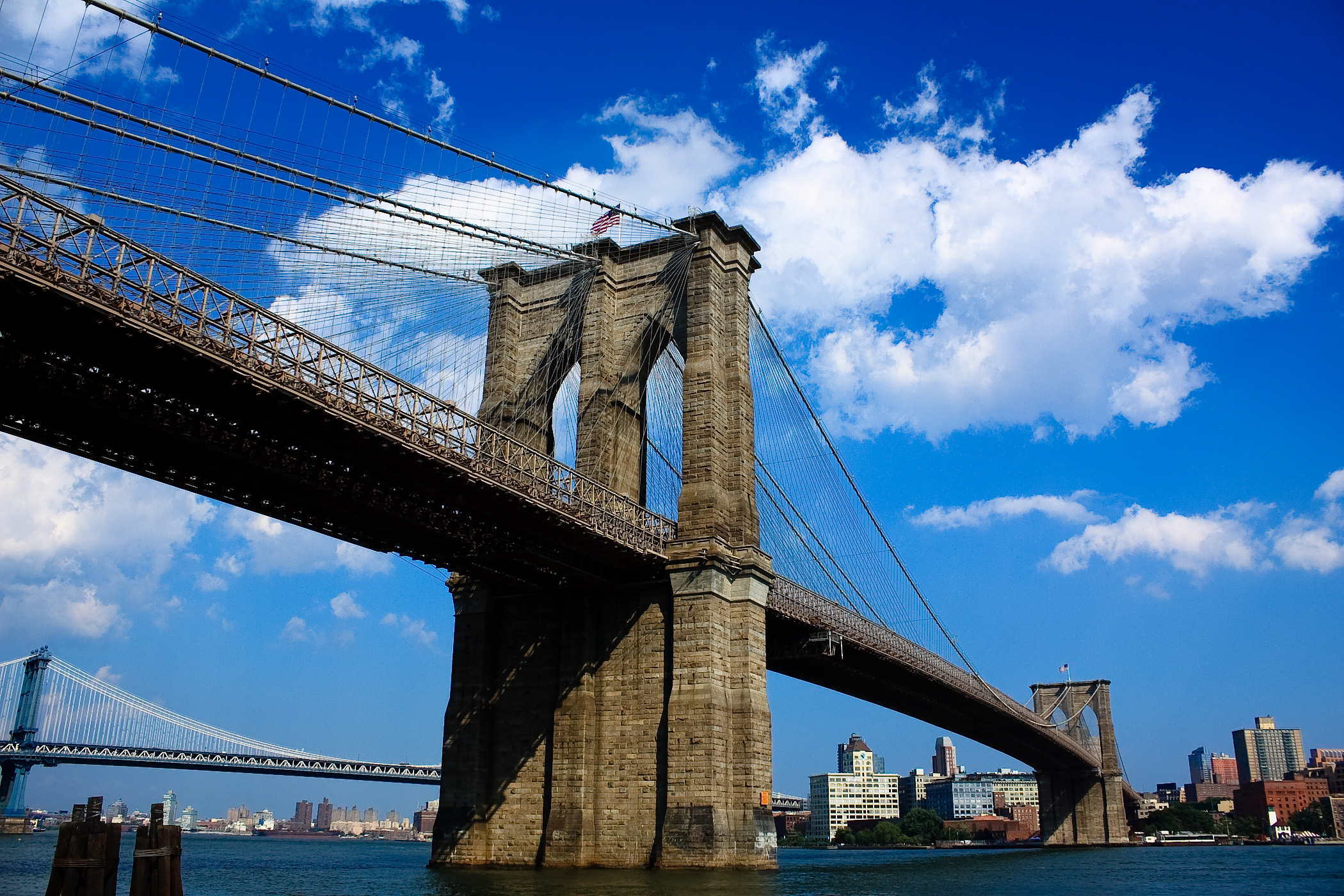
The mass production of steel enabled the construction of large suspension bridges. The Brooklyn Bridge, built in the 1870s, was the first suspension bridge to use steel for its cables.

With the advent of the Industrial Revolution, iron became an important construction material for bridges. Both cast iron (which is strong under compression, but brittle) and wrought iron (which was more ductile and better under tension) were used for building bridges. The Iron Bridge in England – made of cast iron and completed in 1781 – was the first major bridge made entirely of metal. Several long suspension bridges were built in the early 19th century using iron eyebars (steel wire, vastly superior, became available later in the century).

The age of railways began in the 1820s, and led to major innovations in bridge design. Britain is representative of how railways influenced bridge-building in industrialized nations: led by designers Isambard Kingdom Brunel, Robert Stephenson, and Joseph Locke, British railway bridges steadily grew in size as the decades passed. Notable bridges of that era include the High Level Bridge (1849), Royal Border Bridge (1850), Britannia Bridge (1850), Royal Albert Bridge (1859), and Clifton Suspension Bridge (1864). The number of railway bridges in Britain increased from 30,000 to 60,000 during the Railway Mania era. Railway bridges primarily used masonry and stone arch designs, because those could withstand the tremendous loads imposed by trains, but iron beam designs (on masonry or stone piers) were also used. The abundance of inexpensive lumber in North America led that continent to favor timber as a bridge material: using truss designs (for long spans) and trestle designs (for spanning deep ravines).

The mass production of steel in the late 19th century provided a new material for bridges, enabling lighter, stronger truss bridges and cantilever bridges; and steel wires replaced iron bars as the preferred material for suspension bridge cables. Concrete – which was originally used within the Roman Empire – was improved with the invention of Portland cement in the early 19th century, and replaced stone and masonry as the primary material for bridge foundations. When iron or steel is embedded in the concrete, as in reinforced concrete or prestressed concrete, it is a strong, inexpensive material that can be used for horizontal elements of beam bridges and box girder bridges.

=== 1900 to present ===
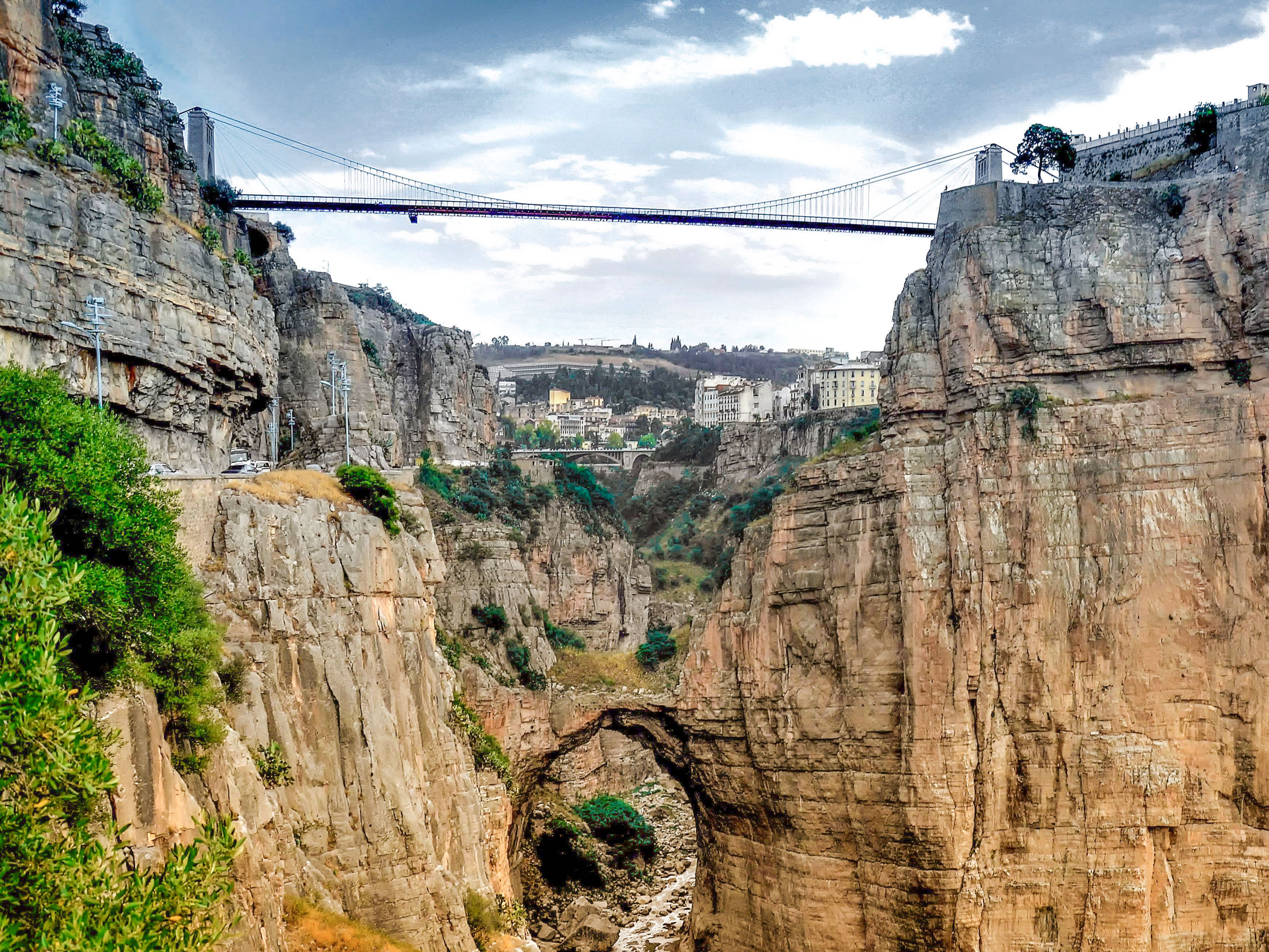
The Sidi M'Cid Bridge in Algeria was the highest bridge in the world when it was built in 1912.

Throughout the 20th century, new bridges – by designer Othmar Ammann and others – repeatedly broke records for span distances, enabling transportation networks to cross increasingly wider rivers and valleys. Cable-stayed bridges – which use cable-stays as the exclusive means of support – became a popular bridge design following World War II. (Note: Straight, inclined cables – known as stays – are used to directly connect the bridge deck to bridge towers. An early cable-stayed bridge was the 1955 Strömsund Bridge in Norway. Stays were used as supplemental supports in some suspension bridges in the 19th century – including the Brooklyn Bridge.) The late 20th century saw several major innovations in bridge design. Extradosed bridges were introduced and found widespread use, predominantly in Japan. In China, concrete-filled steel tubes were adopted as a new approach to building arch bridges. Fiber-reinforced polymers – which do not suffer from the rust problems that plague steel – were used in bridges for many applications, such as beams, deck slabs, prestressing cables, wraps on the exterior of concrete elements, and internal reinforcing within concrete. (Note: Fiber-reinforced polymers include carbon fiber, fiberglass, and aramids.) In the 21st century, a bridge span exceeded 2 kilometers (1.2 mi) for the first time with the construction of the 1915 Çanakkale Bridge. (Note: The maximum theoretical span lengths, using materials available in 2014, are: Beam/girder: 550 meters (1,800 ft). Arch: 4,200 meters (13,800 ft). Cable-stayed: 5,500 meters (18,000 ft). Suspension: 8,000 meters (26,000 ft). As calculated by bridge engineer Man-Chung Tang.)

== Uses ==
The purpose of any bridge is to traverse an obstacle. A bridge can provide support and transport for railways, cars, pedestrians, pipelines, cables, or any combination of these. Aqueducts were developed early in human history, and carried water to towns and cities. Canal systems sometimes include navigable aqueducts (also called canal bridges) to carry boats across a valley or ravine.

=== Transportation ===
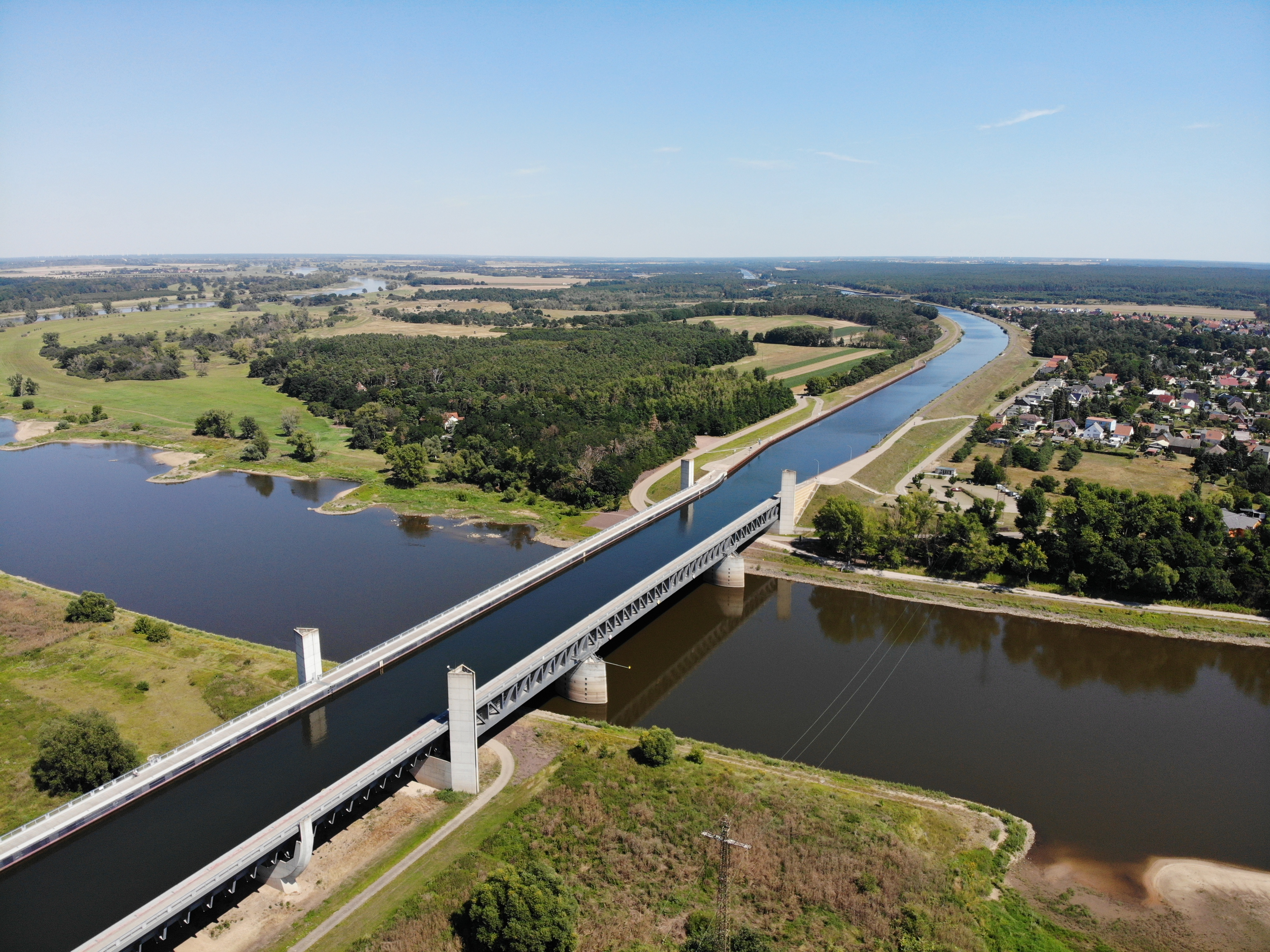
The Magdeburg Water Bridge in Germany carries boats across a valley.

Until the early 19th century, most bridges were designed to carry pedestrians, horses, and horse-drawn carriages. Following the invention of railways, many rail bridges were built; in Britain the number of bridges doubled during the railway-building boom in the mid-19th century. Railway bridges have unique requirements because of the heavy loads they carry – a single locomotive can weigh 197 tonnes (217 short tons). Railway bridges are designed to minimize deflection (bending under load), to maximize robustness (localize the damage caused by accidents), and to tolerate heavy impacts (sudden shocks from, for example, rail wheels striking an imperfection in the track). These requirements led railways to avoid curved bridges, suspension bridges, and cable-stayed bridges; instead, straight beam or truss bridges are commonly used. The explosive growth of motorway networks in the 20th century required bridges to span ever longer distances to reach islands and cross valleys, along with the urban introduction of elevated railways and monorails.

=== Grade separation ===
An important application of bridges is improving safety and traffic flow at traffic junctions where roads or railways cross at ground level. Such intersections require vehicles to stop, and lead to slower traffic, wasted fuel, and higher incidence of collisions. One technique to mitigate these issues is to build a bridge, enabling one of the roads to pass over the other: this process is known as grade separation. (Note: An early example of grade separation for roadways is the Holborn Viaduct in London, completed in 1869.) Grade separation can be implemented at railway-road intersections or road-road intersections.

=== Pedestrians ===
Some bridges, known as footbridges, are devoted to pedestrian traffic. They range from simple boardwalks enabling passage over marshy land to elevated skybridges – including the Minneapolis Skyway System – which shield pedestrians from harsh winter weather. When used to cross roads in busy urban areas, footbridges are generally safer than crosswalks, but have been criticized by urbanists and disability advocates for inconveniencing pedestrians, hindering accessibility, diminishing the quality of city life, and perpetuating car dependency.

=== Military ===
Military bridges are an important type of equipment in the field of military engineering. They perform a variety of wartime roles, namely quickly traversing obstacles in the midst of battle, or facilitating resupply behind front lines. Military bridges can be categorized as wet bridges that rest on pontoon floats, and dry bridges that rest on piers, river banks, or anchorages. A crude mechanism to cross a small ravine is to place a fascine (a large bundle of pipes or logs) into the ravine to enable vehicles to drive across.

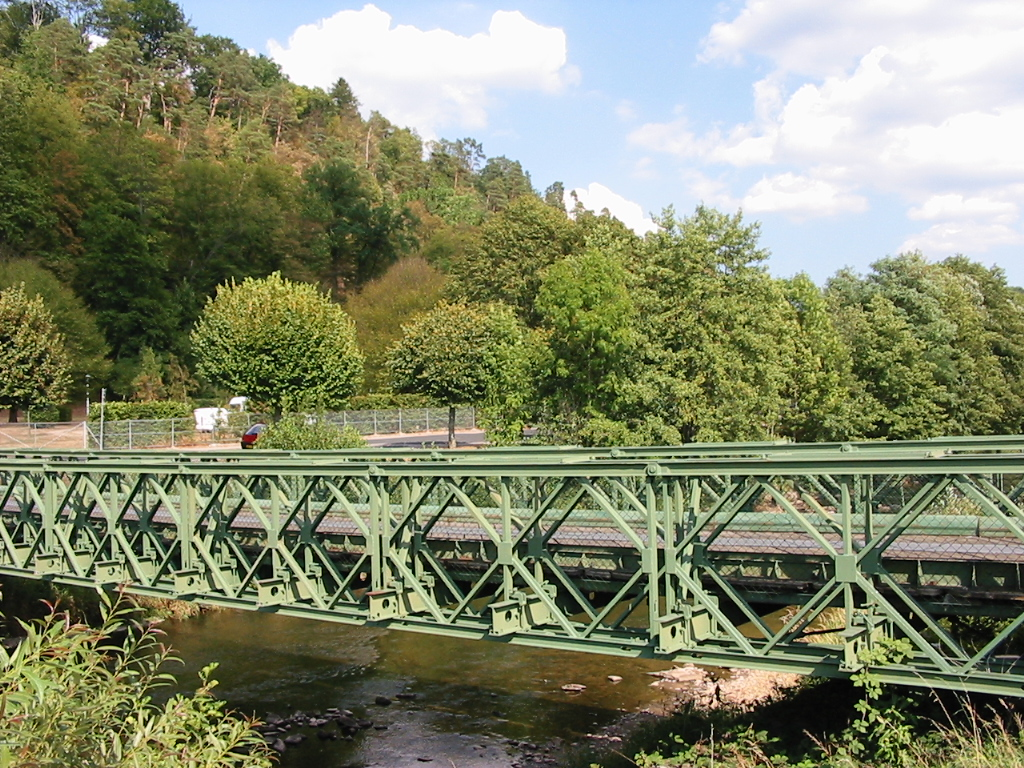
Invented for wartime use, Bailey bridges found civilian use after WWII.

Armoured vehicle-launched bridges are carried on purpose-built vehicles. These vehicles typically have the same cross-country performance as a tank, and can carry a bridge to an obstacle and deploy ("launch") the bridge. The UK's Chieftain vehicle could launch a 23-meter (75 ft) bridge – capable of supporting 54-tonne (60-short-ton) loads – in 3 minutes. Military bridges have found use in civilian applications. The Bailey bridge was originally invented in 1940 for use in World War II, but continues to be used in peacetime. Bailey bridges are used as small, permanent bridges, as well as temporary bridges used while a permanent bridge is being replaced or repaired.

During wartime, bridges are often damaged by bombing or by combat engineers. Bridges can be valuable targets because they are immobile, relatively easy to spot from the air, and damage to the bridge can disrupt the enemy's transportation network. Bridges have been targeted by artillery since antiquity, and the advent of newer technologies – specifically, aircraft and drones – has made bridges easier to attack. Germany used the Stuka aircraft to perform dive-bomb attacks on bridges during World War II, and Ukraine damaged the Crimean Bridge with a drone attack in 2023.

=== Other ===
Some bridges accommodate uses other than transportation. Pipeline bridges carry oil pipes or water pipes across valleys or rivers. Many historical bridges supported buildings, including shrines, factories, shops, restaurants, and houses. Notable examples were the Old London Bridge and Ponte Vecchio. Some bridges built in Europe in the Middle Ages incorporated chapels into their design. In the modern era, bridge-restaurants can be found at some highway rest areas; these support a restaurant or shops directly above the highway and are accessible to drivers moving in both directions. Examples include the Will Rogers Archway over the Oklahoma Turnpike and the several Illinois Tollway oasis locations. The Nový Most bridge in Bratislava features a restaurant set atop its single tower. Conservationists use wildlife bridges to reduce habitat fragmentation and animal-vehicle collisions. The first wildlife crossings were built in the 1950s, and these types of bridges are now used worldwide.

== Structure and form ==
Bridges are primarily classified by their basic structural design: arch, truss, cantilever, suspension, cable-stayed, or beam. (Note: In some contexts, beams and girders are treated as distinct types of structures. Suspension and cable-stayed are sometimes grouped together as cable-supported bridges.) Several other terms can be used to designate various aspects of a bridge's form or design, including viaduct, trestle, and causeway.

=== Basic structures ===
The choice of bridge structure to use in a particular situation is based on many factors, including aesthetics, environment, cost, and purpose. Some bridge spans combine two types of basic structures; for instance, the Brooklyn Bridge is primarily a suspension structure, but also uses cable-stays. Some multi-span bridges – called hybrid bridges – use different basic structures for different spans.

==== Arch bridge ====
Arch bridge

Deck arch

Tied arch

Arch bridges consist of a curved arch, under compression, which supports the deck either above or below the arch. The shape of the arch can be a semicircle, ellipse, pointed arch, or segment of a circle. Arches exert a diagonal force at both ends, requiring strong supports or abutments to prevent the arch from spreading or collapsing. Deck arch bridges hold the deck above the arch; tied-arch bridges suspend the deck below the arch; and through arch bridges position the deck through the middle of the arch.

==== Truss bridge ====
Truss bridge

Through truss

Deck truss

A truss bridge is composed of multiple, connected triangular elements. The set of triangles form a rigid whole, which rests on the foundation at both ends, applying a vertical force downward. The deck can be carried on top of the truss ("deck truss") or at the bottom of the truss ("through truss"). Through trusses are useful when more clearance under the bridge is required; deck trusses permit oversize loads and do not interfere with overhead objects, such as electrical lines. The individual bars can be made of iron or wood, but most modern truss bridges are made of steel. The horizontal bars along the top are usually in compression, and the horizontal bars along the bottom are usually in tension. Bars connecting the top and bottom may be in tension or compression, depending on the layout of the triangles. Trusses typically have a span-to-depth ratio (the width of a structure divided by its height) ranging from 10 to 16, compared to beam bridges which typically have a ratio ranging from 20 to 30. Trusses tend to be relatively stiff, and are commonly used for rail bridges which are required to carry very heavy loads.

==== Cantilever bridge ====
Cantilever bridge

Balanced cantilever on a single pier

Two cantilevers extending from anchorages

Cantilever bridges consist of beams or trusses that are rigidly attached to a support (pier or anchorage) and extend horizontally from the support without additional supports. In ancient Asia, cantilever bridges made of large rocks or timber were used to span small obstacles. In the 1880s, some early cantilever bridges were built from wrought iron, but steel became common starting in the late 19th century. A balanced cantilever bridge consists of two connected cantilevers extending outward in opposite directions from a single central support. Other cantilever bridges have two cantilevers, anchored at each end of the span, extending toward the center, and meeting in the center. Cantilever construction is a method of building a bridge superstructure, which can be utilized for arch and cable-stayed bridges, as well as cantilever bridges. In this technique, construction begins at a support (specifically a pier, abutment, or tower) and extends outwards across the obstacle, with no support from below.

==== Suspension bridge ====
Suspension bridge

With anchorages

Self-anchored

Suspension bridges have large, curved cables attached to the tops of tall towers, (Note: Most suspension bridges and cable-stayed bridges have two or more towers, but some have only one tower. A single-tower cable-stayed bridge is the Flehe Bridge in Germany, and a single-tower suspension bridge is the east span of the San Francisco-Oakland Bay Bridge.) and suspend the bridge deck from the cables. (Note: The deck is suspended from the cables by large wire ropes called hangers, also called suspenders.) In the early 19th century, the first modern suspension bridges – such as the Jacob's Creek Bridge – were chain bridges that used iron bars rather than bundled wires for the cables. After steel wire became widely available, longer cables could be built by stringing hundreds of wires between the towers and bundling them, enabling suspension bridges to achieve spans 2 kilometers (1.2 miles) long. When the bridge crosses a river, stringing the wires across the large span is a complex process. The cable of a suspension bridge assumes the shape of a catenary when initially suspended between the bridge towers; however, once the uniform load of the bridge deck is applied, the cable adopts a parabolic shape. Shorter towers require a smaller sag in the cable, which increases the tension in the cable, and thus requires stronger towers and anchorages.

==== Cable-stayed bridge ====
Cable-stayed bridge

Harp pattern, two towers

Fan pattern, single tower

Cable-stayed bridges are similar to suspension bridges, but the cables that support the deck connect directly to the towers. The inclined cables may be arranged in a fan pattern or a harp pattern. (Note: In a harp pattern all the cables are parallel; in a fan pattern the cables all radiate from near the top of the tower. The Severins Bridge was the first cable-stayed bridge that arranged its cables in a fan pattern, rather than a harp pattern. Other cable-stay patterns include star and radial.) Modern cable-stayed bridges became popular after World War II, when the design was used for many new bridges in Germany. When traversing a wide obstacle, designers have a choice of suspension or cable-stayed structures. Suspension bridges can achieve a longer span, but cable-stayed bridges use less cable for a given span size, do not require anchorages, and the deck can be readily built by cantilevering outward from the towers.

==== Beam bridge ====
Beam bridge

Beam bridges are simple structures consisting of one or more parallel, horizontal beams or girders that span an obstacle. A box girder bridge is a variant that is generally shallower than an I-beam equivalent, permitting shorter and lower approach roads to cross an obstacle of a given height. Beam bridges are commonly used for both railways and roadways. Beam bridges are often used for spans shorter than about 50 meters (160 ft); for longer spans, trusses or similar structures are generally more efficient. The majority of beam bridges have a flat, horizontal bottom; but some have a bottom that arches upward, called haunching. Haunching looks more graceful than a flat bottom, and can provide greater clearance below the bridge, but it tends to be more costly because flat bottom beams are easier to build.

=== Other forms ===
In addition to the basic bridge structures, there are many other forms of bridges. The following sections describe some of the more common forms, but are not an exhaustive list.

==== Movable bridge ====
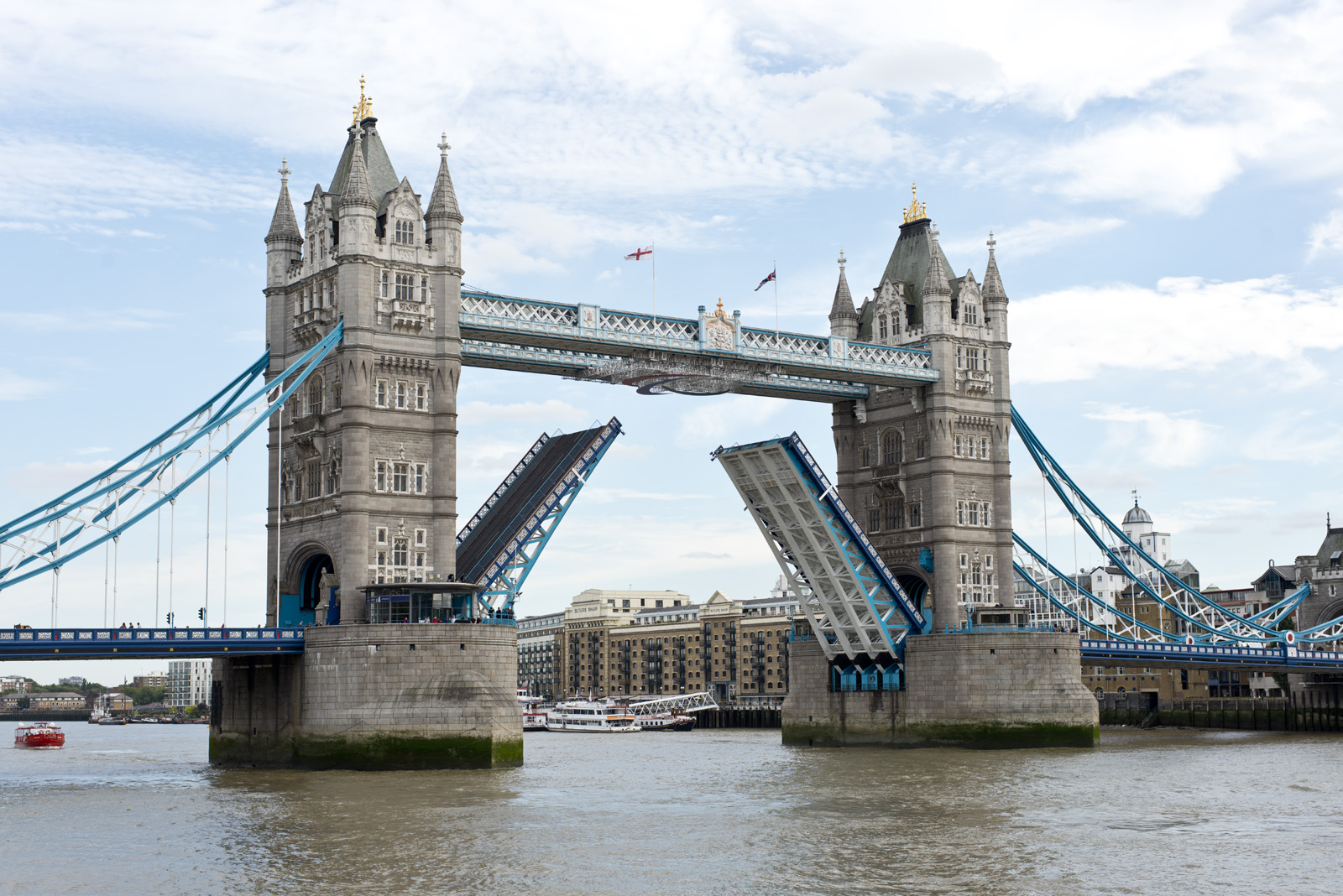
Tower Bridge in London is a movable bridge.

Movable bridges are designed so that all or part of the bridge deck can be moved, usually to permit tall traffic – such as tall boats or ships – to pass by. Early movable bridges include drawbridges that pivoted at one end, and required a large amount of work to raise. Adding counterweights on the pivot side of the drawbridge creates a bascule bridge, and makes moving the bridge easier and safer. Swing bridges pivot horizontally around an anchor point on the bank of a canal, or sometimes from a pier in the middle of the water. Lift bridges are raised vertically between two towers by cables passing over pulleys at the top of the towers. Notable movable bridges include El Ferdan Railway Bridge in Egypt, Erasmusbrug bascule in Rotterdam, and Limehouse Basin footbridge in London. In the modern era, designers sometimes create unusual movable bridges with the intention of establishing signature bridges for a town or locality. Examples include the Puente de la Mujer swing bridge in Buenos Aires, the Gateshead Millennium – a rare example of a tilt bridge – over the River Tyne, and the Hörn Bridge in Germany. (Note: These bridges were designed by Santiago Calatrava (Spain), WilkinsonEyre (England), and Schlaich Bergermann (Germany).)

==== Long multi-span bridge ====
The Millau Viaduct crosses the Tarn river valley in France.

There are a variety of terms that describe long, multi-span bridges – including viaduct, trestle, continuous, and causeway. The usage of the terms can overlap, but each has a specific focus. Viaducts (carrying vehicles) and aqueducts (carrying water) are bridges crossing a valley or underpass, supported by multiple arches or piers. Romans built many aqueducts, some of which are still standing today. Notable viaducts include Penponds Viaduct in England, Garabit Viaduct in France, Tunkhannock Viaduct in Pennsylvania, and Millau Viaduct in France.

A trestle bridge – commonly used in the 19th century for railway bridges – consists of multiple short spans supported by closely spaced structural elements. A trestle is similar to a viaduct, but viaducts typically have taller pier supports and longer spans. A continuous truss bridge is a long, single truss that rests upon multiple supports. A continuous truss bridge may use less material than a series of simple trusses because a continuous truss distributes live loads across all the spans (in contrast to a series of simple trusses, where each truss must be capable of supporting the entire live load). Visually, a continuous truss looks similar to a cantilever bridge, but a continuous truss experiences hogging stresses at the supports and sagging stresses between the supports. (Note: Similarly, a continuous beam consists of a single, rigid beam that crosses two or more spans.) A causeway is a low road, usually crossing a bog, marsh, lake, or other body of water. Many causeways are earthen embankments, but some are raised bridges, such as the 38.4-kilometer (23.9-mile) Lake Pontchartrain Causeway in Louisiana.

==== Extradosed ====
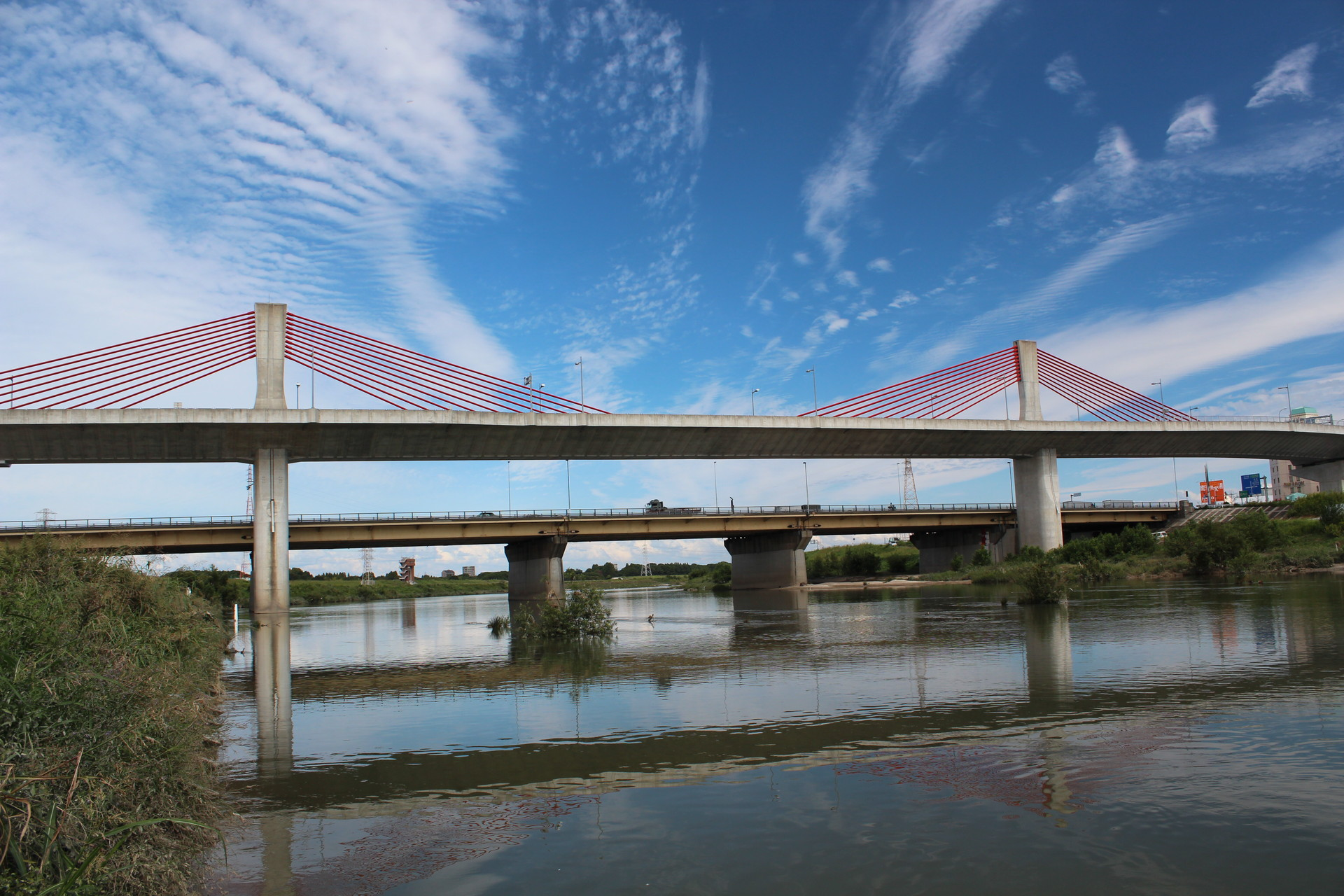
The Shinmeisai Bridge (foreground) in Japan is an example of an extradosed bridge.

An extradosed bridge combines features of a box girder bridge and a cable-stayed bridge. Visually, extradosed bridges can be distinguished from cable-stayed bridges because the tower height (above the deck) is relatively low: between seven and thirteen percent of the span width. Extradosed bridges are appropriate for spans ranging from 100 meters (330 ft) to 250 meters (820 ft). Unlike suspension bridges or cable-stayed bridges, the towers of an extradosed bridge often rest on the deck (rather than on a footing) and are solidly connected to the deck. Because of the relatively flat angle of the cables, the cables of an extradosed bridge compress the deck horizontally, performing a function comparable to prestressing wires that are used within concrete girders. Extradosed bridges may be appropriate in applications where the deck must have a shallow depth to maximize clearance under the bridge; or where towers must be relatively short to abide by aviation safety constraints.

==== Pontoon bridge ====
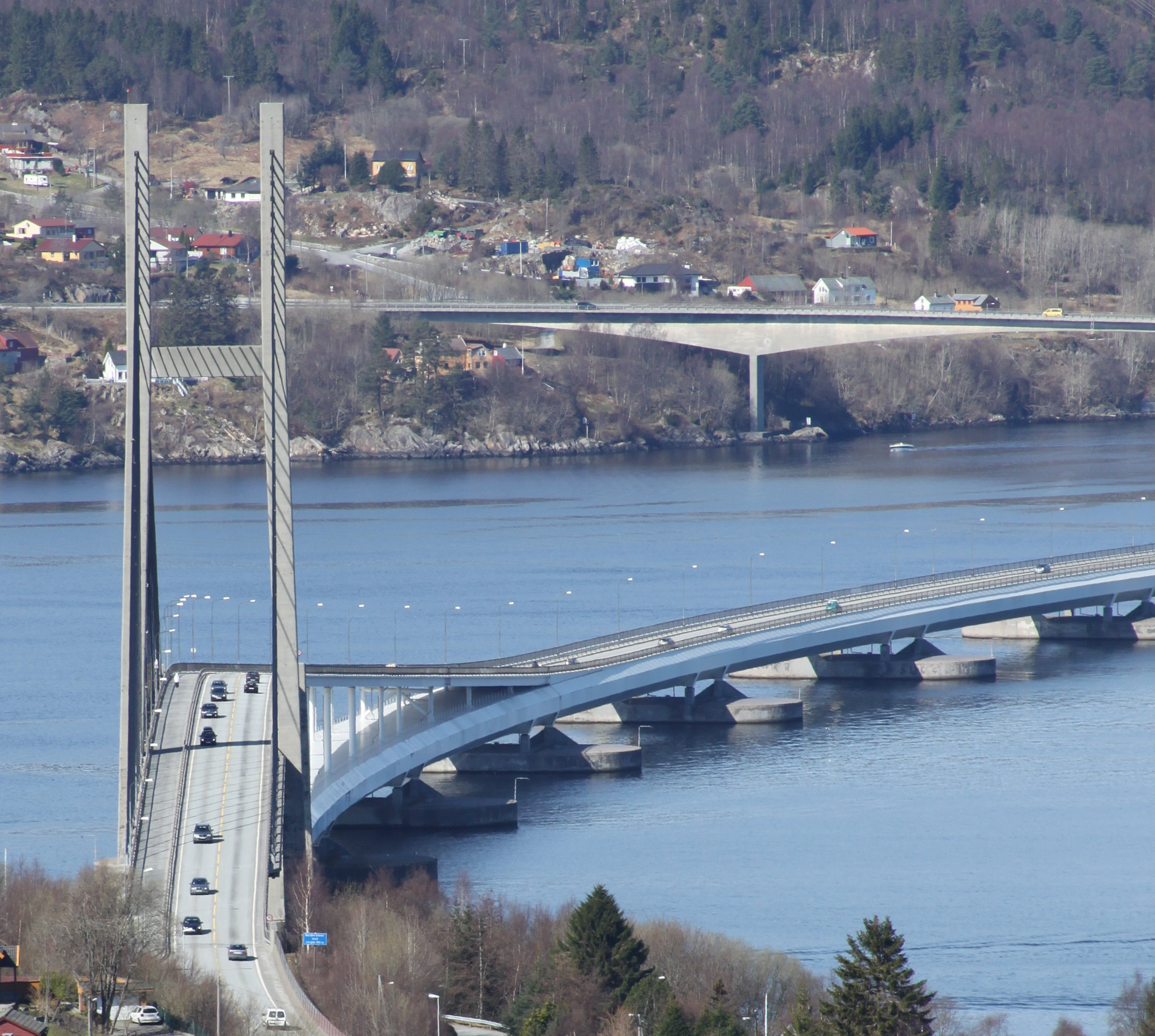
Floating concrete pontoons support the weight of the Nordhordland Bridge as it crosses a deep fjord in Norway.

A pontoon bridge, also known as a floating bridge, uses floats or shallow-draft boats to support a continuous deck for pedestrian or vehicle travel over water. Pontoon bridges are typically used where waters are too deep to build piers, or as a mechanism to implement a movable swing bridge in a canal. During the Second Persian invasion of Greece, Persian ruler Xerxes built a large pontoon bridge across the Hellespont, consisting of two parallel rows of 360 boats.

Several pontoon bridges are in use in the modern world. Washington state in the US has several, including Hood Canal Bridge. In Norway, Nordhordland Bridge crosses a deep fjord by resting on floating concrete pontoons. Many armies have pontoon bridges that can be rapidly deployed, including the PMP Floating Bridge, designed by the USSR.

== Design ==
=== Design process ===
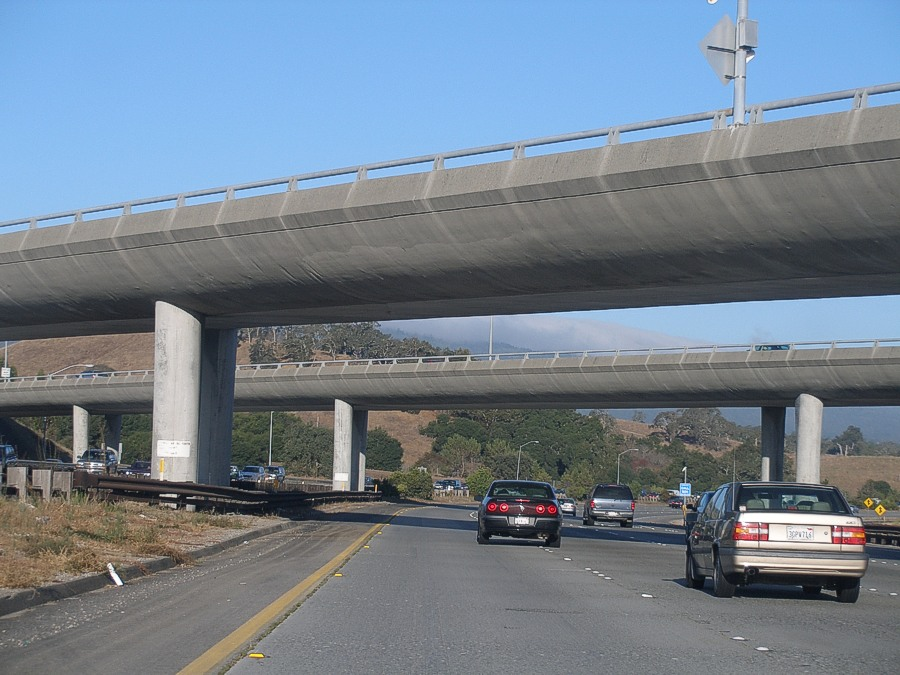
Many overpass bridges in the United States Interstate Highway System are concrete box girder bridges, such as these bridges over Interstate 280 in California.

The process for designing a new bridge typically goes through several stages, progressively refining the design. An early step in the design process – sometimes called conceptual design – is to consider the multiple requirements that a bridge must satisfy. Requirements that are directly related to function include lifespan, safety, climate, soil condition, traffic volume, the size and nature of the obstacle to be traversed, and clearance required for passage underneath. Other constraints may include construction cost, maintenance cost, aesthetics, time available for construction, owner preference, and experience of the builders. Some bridge designs consider factors such as impact on the environment and wildlife, and the bridge's economic, social, and historic relationship to the local community. After the requirements of a bridge are established, a bridge designer uses structural analysis methods to identify candidate designs. Several designs may meet the requirements. The value engineering methodology can be used to select a final design from multiple alternatives. This methodology evaluates candidate designs based on weighted scores assigned to several different criteria, including cost, service life, durability, availability of resources, ease of construction, construction time, and maintenance cost.

An important requirement considered during the design process is the service life, which is a specific number of years that the bridge is expected to remain in operation with routine maintenance (and without requiring major repairs). (Note: Routine maintenance includes replacing bridge elements that are designed to be replaced, specifically the wearable surface of the deck, or certain cables.) For example, wood bridge superstructures typically have a service life of 10 to 50 years. (Note: Bridges made from glued laminated timber, if properly designed, can have service lives longer than 50 years.) Concrete highway bridges can have service lives of 75 to 150 years. A bridge design methodology incorporates the service life into the design process.

=== Specifications and standards ===
One of the requirements a new bridge must satisfy is compliance with the local bridge design specifications and codes which – in some countries – may be legally binding requirements. In many countries, these specifications are developed and published by standards organizations that define acceptable bridge-building practices and designs. In Europe, the organization is the European Committee for Standardization, and the standards it publishes are the Eurocodes. In the United States, the American Association of State Highway and Transportation Officials (AASHTO) publishes the AASHTO LRFD Bridge Design Specifications. (Note: A list of some bridge-related specifications in the US is found in Planning and Design of Bridges.) Canada's bridge standard is the Canadian Highway Bridge Design Code, developed by the non-profit CSA Group. Agencies that regulate aviation or waterways may also impose standards that dictate some aspects of a bridge design, such as requirements for aviation warning lights at the top of bridge towers, or navigational warning lights on bridge supports located in navigable waterways.

=== Aesthetics ===
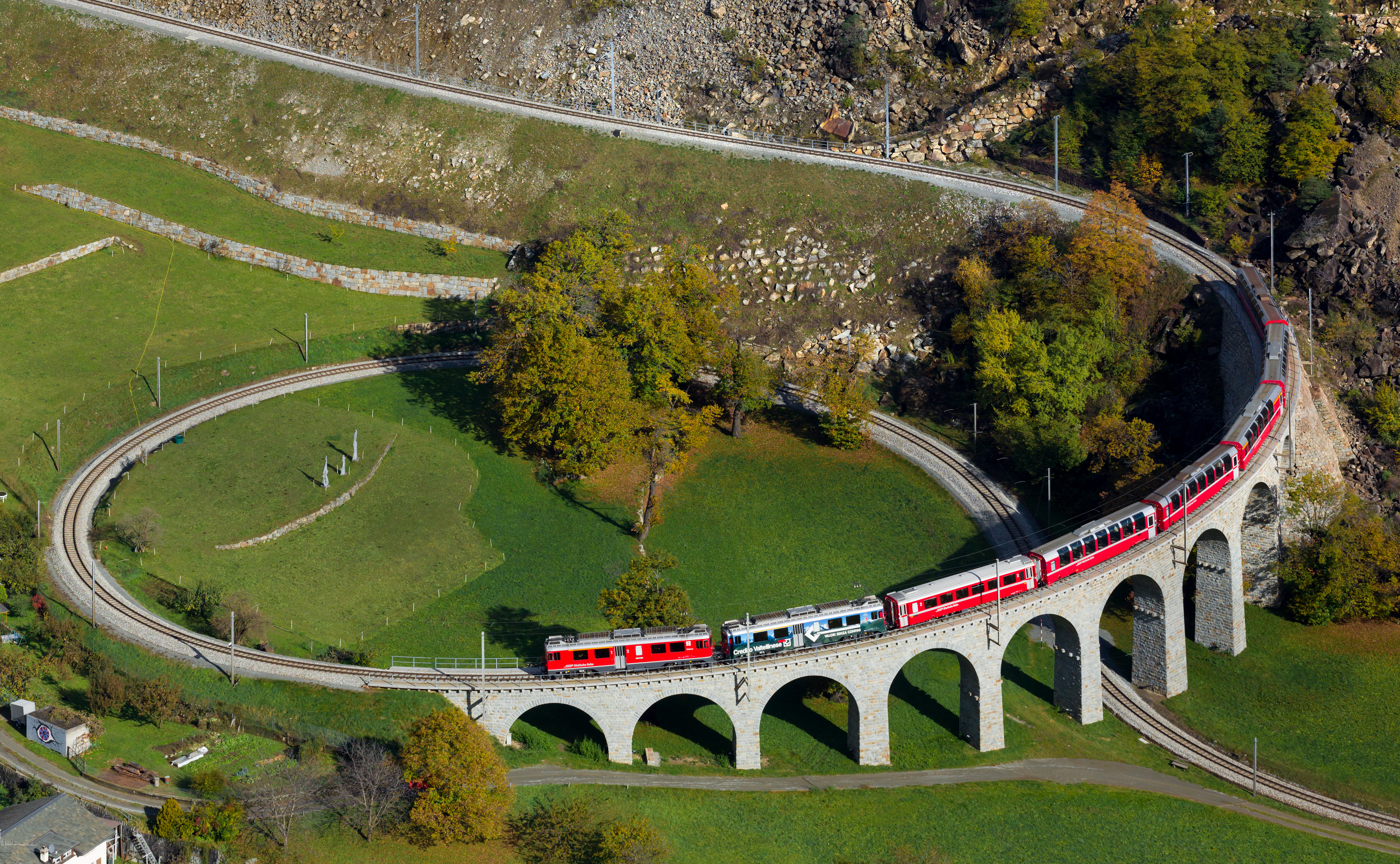
The Brusio spiral viaduct – a part of the Bernina railway in Switzerland – is a World Heritage Site.

A bridge's appearance is one of the factors considered during its design. Attractive bridges can have a positive impact on a community, and some bridges can even be considered as works of art. Bridge designers that are known for emphasizing the visual appeal of their bridges include Thomas Telford, Gustave Eiffel, John Roebling, Robert Maillart, and Santiago Calatrava. Qualities that influence the perceived attractiveness of a bridge include proportion, color, texture, order, refinement, environmental integration, and functionality.

The art historian Dan Cruickshank notes that bridges are regarded as manifestations of human imagination and ambition, and that many bridges transcend their original utilitarian role and become a work of art. He writes "[a] great bridge has an emotional impact, it has a sublime quality and a heroic beauty that moves even those who are not accustomed to having their senses inflamed by the visual arts."

=== Material ===
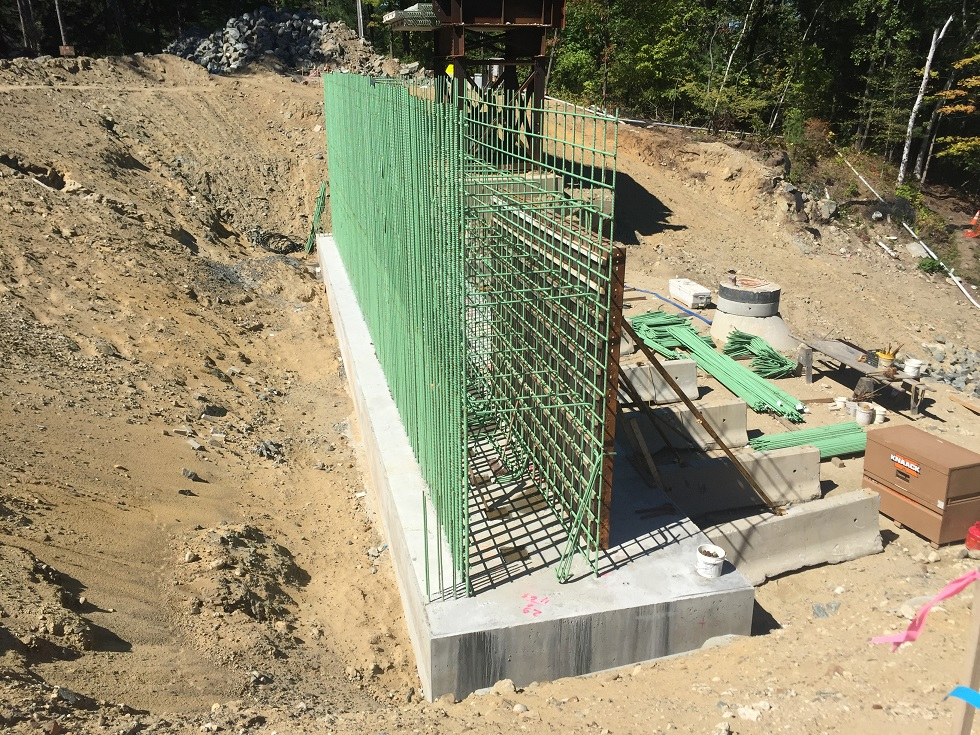
This concrete bridge support is being prepared for a concrete pour. After the concrete cures, the green reinforcing bars will be permanently embedded inside.

A bridge designer can select from a wide variety of materials, including wood, brick, rope, stone, iron, steel, and concrete. (Note: The number of bridges in the US in 2018, based on their primary material, are: 60% concrete, 30% steel, and 3% wood (the remainder are masonry, aluminum iron, etc).) A bridge made from two or more distinct materials (for example, steel and concrete) is known as a composite bridge. Some of the largest arch bridges are composite, because they are made from concrete and steel.

Wood is an inexpensive renewable resource with a high strength-to-weight ratio, but it is rarely used for modern roadway bridges because it is prone to degradation from the environment, and is much weaker than steel or concrete. Wood is primarily used in beam or truss bridges including covered bridges, and is also used to build large trestle bridges for railways. When wood is used, it is often in the form of glued laminated timber. Masonry includes stone and brick, and is suitable only for elements of a bridge that are under compression (as opposed to tension), therefore, masonry is limited to structures such as arches or foundations. In the 20th century, large masonry bridges – although superseded by concrete in the West – continued to be built in China.

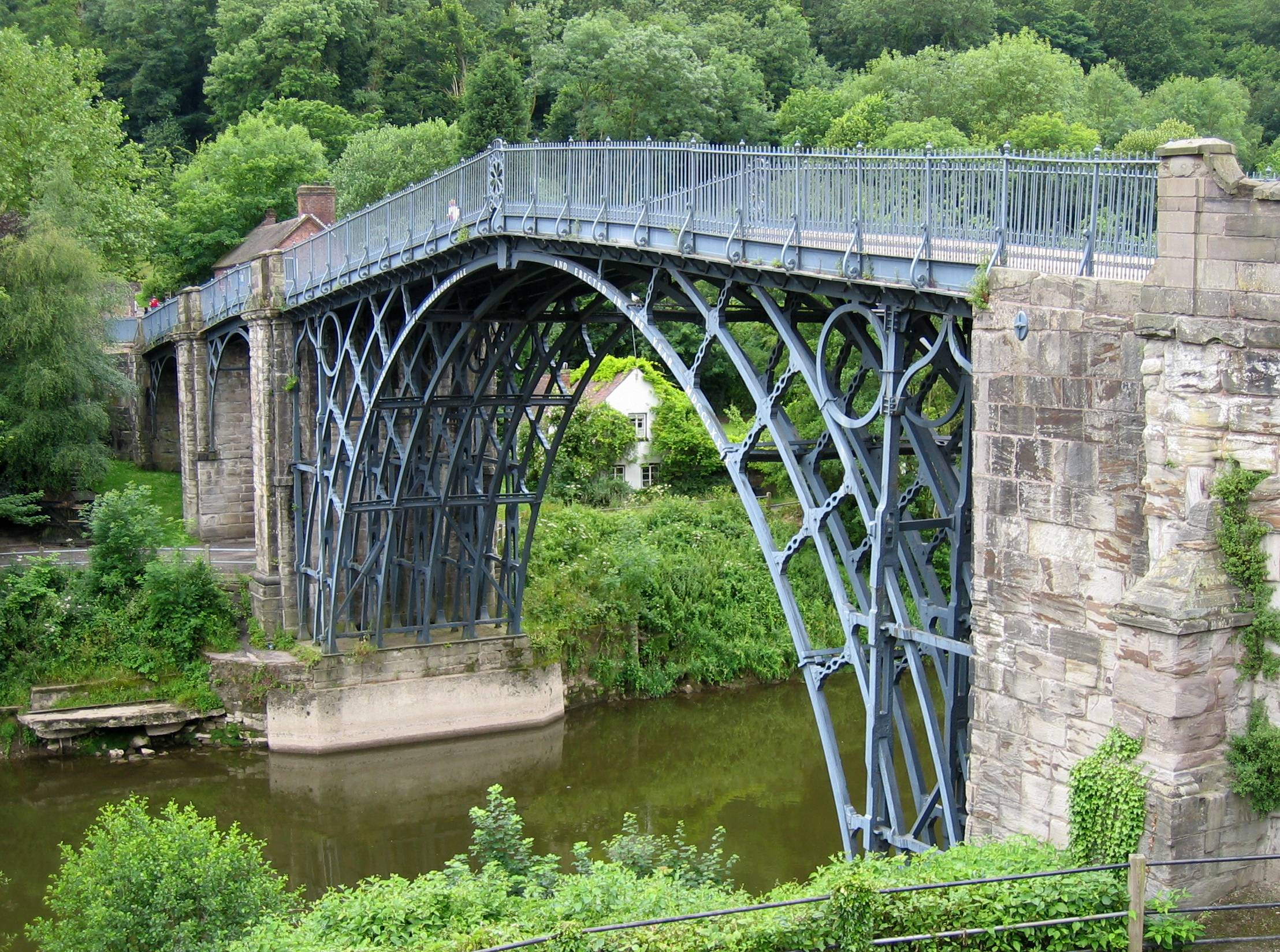
The Iron Bridge in Shropshire, England, completed in 1781, is the first major bridge made entirely of cast iron.

Iron – including cast iron and wrought iron – was used extensively from the late 18th century to late 19th century, primarily for arch and truss structures. Iron is relatively brittle, and has been replaced by steel for all but ornamental uses. Steel is one of the most common materials used in modern bridges because it is strong in both compression and tension. Steel was made in small quantities in antiquity, but became widely available in the late 19th century following invention of new smelting processes. Truss bridges and beam bridges are often made of steel, and steel wires are an essential component of virtually all suspension bridges and cable-stayed bridges. Steel is a critical component in concrete bridges, because steel reinforcing bars or steel prestressed cables must be embedded within concrete to make it sufficiently strong. Steel bridges are more expensive than comparable concrete bridges, but they are much lighter (for the same strength), faster to build, and offer more flexibility during construction and repair.

Concrete is commonly used in modern bridges, and many roadway bridges are built primarily with a reinforced concrete beam structure, often of the box girder variety. (Note: High-performance concrete is becoming more commonly used in bridges (compared to conventional concrete) because it suffers less damage from heavy traffic and lasts longer. Conventional concrete has strength about 25 to 50 MPa, whereas high-performance concrete has strength about 50 to 100 MPa.) The shape of concrete elements is determined by the formwork (mold) into which the concrete is poured (cast): the concrete will adopt the shape of the formwork as it cures. Beams can be precast offsite and transported to the bridge site, or cast in place. Bridges use concrete that contains embedded steel reinforcing bars – placed within the concrete when it is initially poured – which greatly increase the strength. Concrete is a strong and inexpensive material, but is brittle and can crack when in tension. If concrete is used in elements that may experience tension, prestressed cables are usually embedded within the concrete and tightened, which compresses the concrete. When a horizontal beam is placed into the bridge and carries a load, the undesirable tension (produced by the tendency of the beam to sag) is counteracted by the compression from the prestressed cables. The prestressed cables can be pre-tensioned (stretched before – and while – the concrete cures); or post-tensioned (placed within tubes in the concrete, and tightened after the concrete cures).

=== Double-deck bridge ===
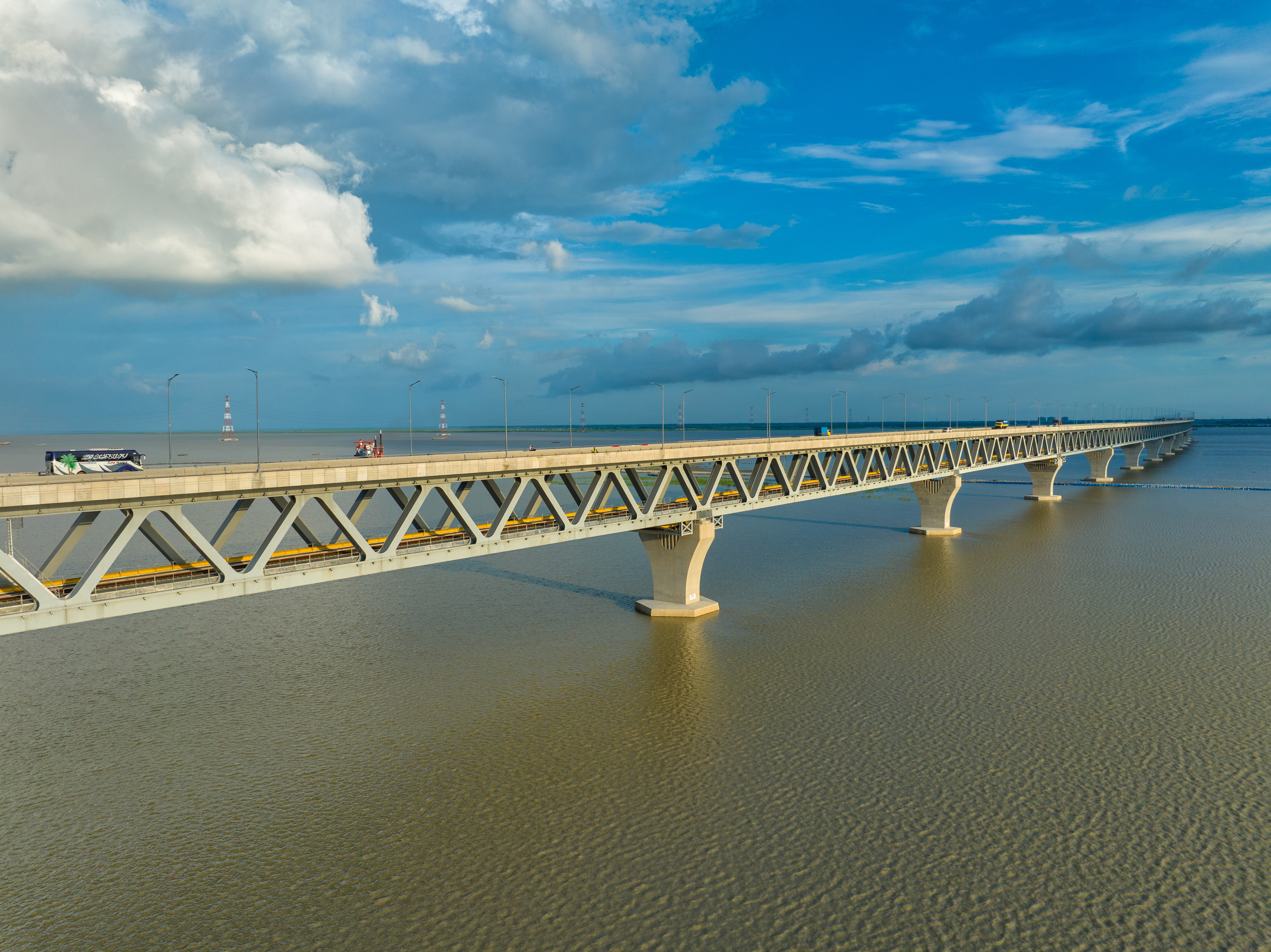
The Padma Bridge in Bangladesh carries rail traffic on the lower deck and vehicular traffic on the upper deck.

Designers may choose to use a double-deck design (also known as double-decked or double-decker), that carries two decks on top of each other. This technique can be used to increase the amount of traffic a bridge can carry; or when the location constrains the size of the bridge. Double-deck bridges also permit two different kinds of traffic to be safely carried. For example, motor vehicles can be separated from pedestrians or railways. Some double-deck bridges carry rail on one deck, and vehicles on the other deck. An early example was the Niagara Falls Suspension Bridge, and a modern example is the Dom Luís I Bridge in Portugal. Because of their ability to carry large amounts of motor vehicles, double-deck bridges are often found near large cities carrying cars on both decks, for example, the DuSable Bridge in Chicago, Tsing Ma Bridge in Hong Kong, the Øresund Bridge connecting Copenhagen and Malmö, and the Shimotsui-Seto Bridge near Kurashiki. The George Washington Bridge in New York carries 14 motor vehicle lanes (eight above, six below), and is the world's busiest bridge, carrying over 100 million vehicles annually.

=== Load analysis ===
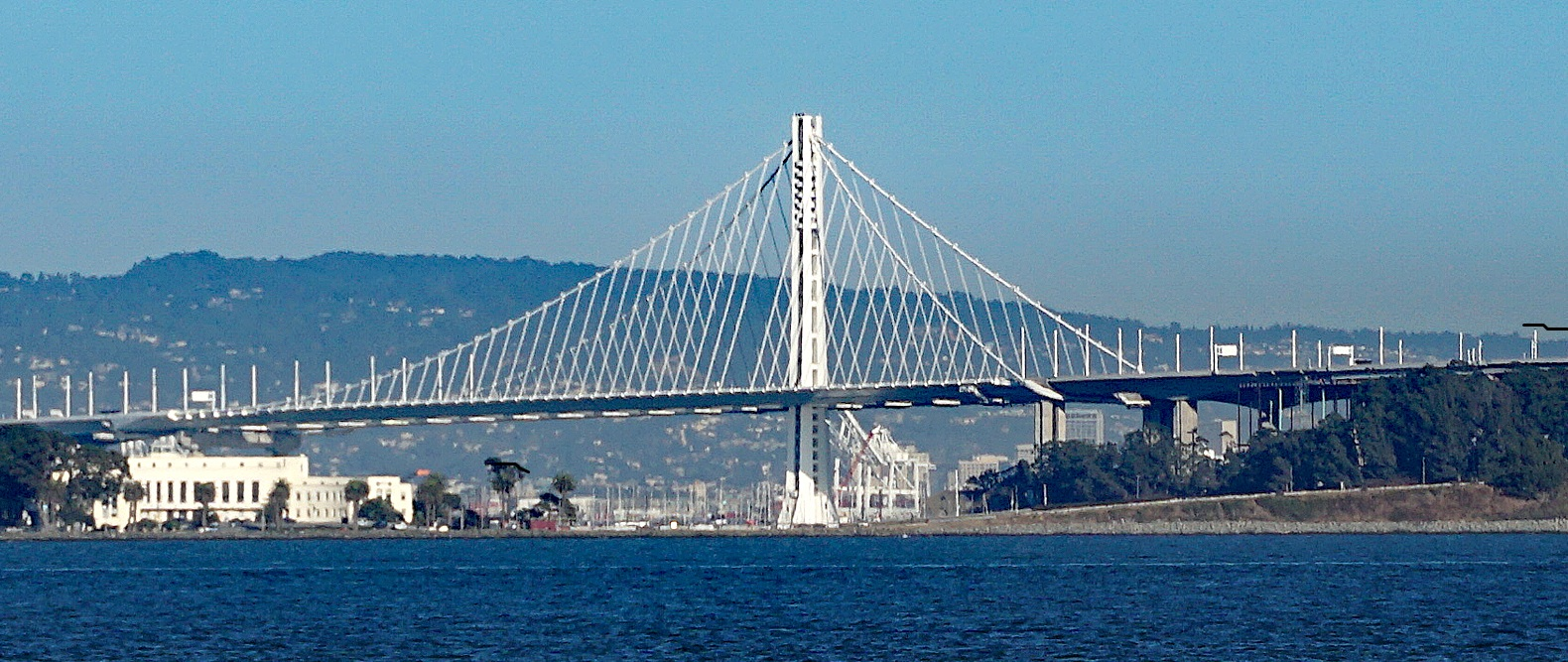
The San Francisco–Oakland Bay Bridge is designed to withstand severe earthquakes. The eastern span, shown above, is a self-anchored suspension bridge which can survive a once-in-1,500-year earthquake.

A bridge design must accommodate all loads and forces that the bridge might reasonably experience. The totality of the forces that the bridge must tolerate is the structural load, which is often divided into three components: dead load, live load, and environmental load. The dead load is the weight of the bridge itself. (Note: The dead load also includes any permanent fixtures on the bridge, including light poles, traffic signage, and guardrails;) The live load is all forces and vibrations caused by traffic passing over the bridge, including weight, braking, and acceleration. The environmental load encompasses all forces applied by the bridge's surroundings, including weather, earthquakes, mudslides, water currents, flooding, soil subsidence, frost heaving, temperature fluctuations, and collisions.

For sporadic events like floods, earthquakes, collisions, and hurricanes, bridge designers select a maximum severity that the design must accommodate. The severity is based on the return period, which is average time between events of a given magnitude. Return periods range from 10 to 2,500 years, depending on type of event and the country in which the bridge is located. (Note: Authors discussing international bridge design policies provide return period examples of 10, 50, 350, 475, 500, 1,000, 2,000, and 2,500 years.) Longer return periods are used for bridges that are a critical part of the transportation infrastructure. For example, if the bridge is a key lifeline in case of emergencies, the designer may utilize relatively long return period, for instance, 2,000 years; in this example, the design must endure the strongest storm that is expected to happen once every 2,000 years.

==== Stress and strain ====
The load forces acting on a bridge cause the components of the bridge to become stressed. Stress is a measure of the internal force experienced within a material. Strain is a measure of how much a bridge component bends, stretches, or twists in response to stress. Some strain (bending or twisting) may be acceptable in a bridge component if the material is elastic. For example, steel can tolerate some stretching or bending without failing. In contrast, concrete is inelastic, and the change in its shape when stressed is negligible (until the stress becomes excessive and the concrete fails).

A critical phase of the design process is calculating the maximum stress that each bridge component will experience, and selecting an appropriate design and size for the components to ensure they will safely tolerate the loads on the bridge. Stresses are categorized based on the nature of the force that causes the stress, namely: compression, tension, shear, and torsion. Compression forces compact a component by pushing inward (for example, as felt by a bridge foundation when a heavy tower is resting on it). Tension is a stretching force experienced by a component when pulled (for example by the cables of a suspension bridge). Shear is a sliding force experienced by a component when two offset external forces are applied in opposite directions (for example, during an earthquake when the upper part of a structure is pulled north, and the lower part is pulled south). Torsion is a twisting force.

The bridge design process typically employs structural analysis methods that divide the bridge into smaller components, and analyze the components individually, subject to certain constraints. A proposed bridge design is then usually modeled with formulas or computer applications. The models incorporate the loads the bridge will experience, calculate the stresses in the bridge, and provide data to the designer indicating whether the design meets the required design goals. (Note: The finite element method is a numerical model commonly used to perform detailed analysis of stresses and loads of a bridge design.) To ensure that a proposed bridge design is sufficiently strong to endure foreseeable stresses, many bridge designers use limit state design methodologies (used in Europe and China) or Load and Resistance Factor Design (LRFD) methodologies (used in US).

==== Vibration ====
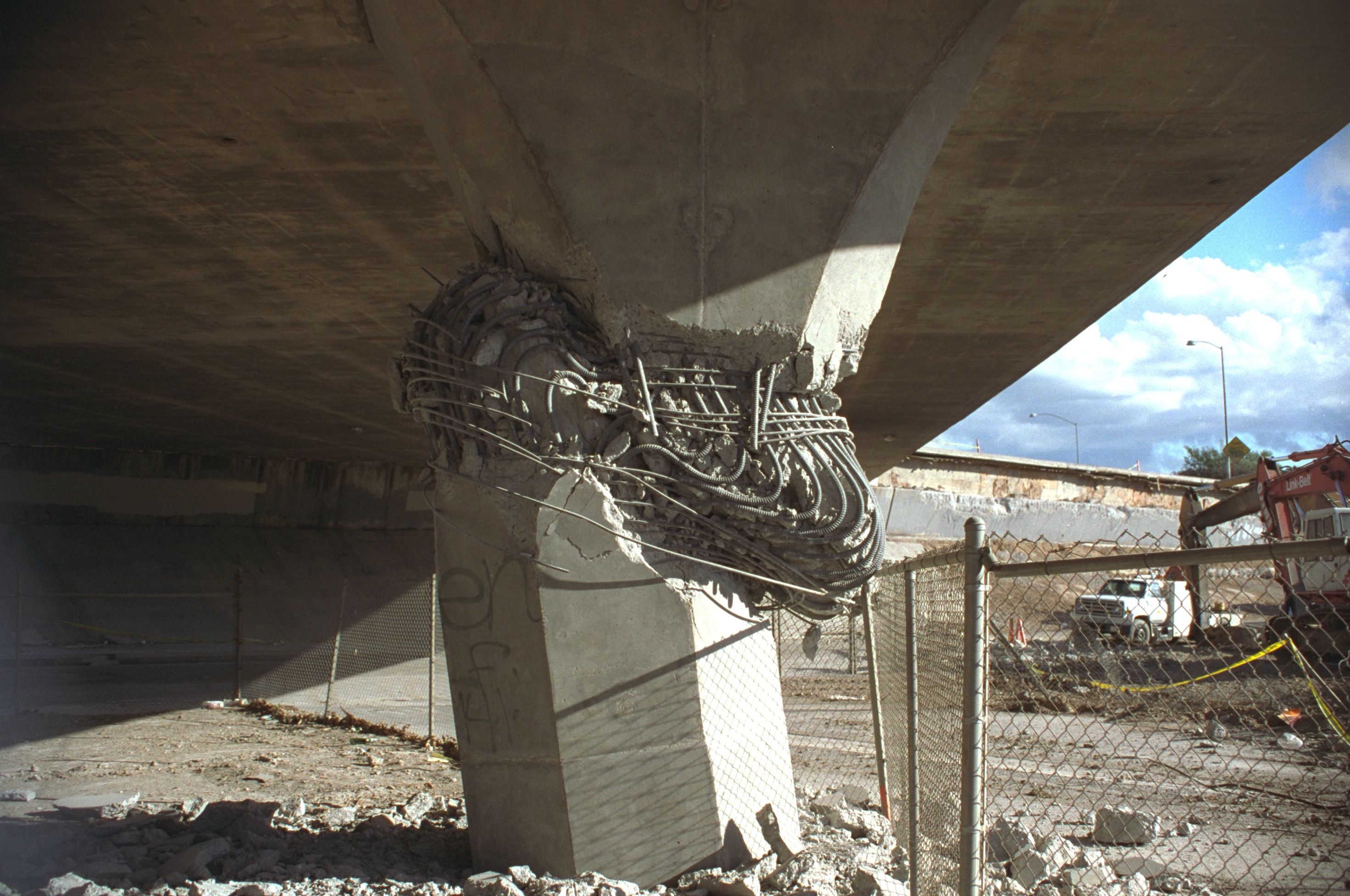
The 1994 Northridge earthquake damaged several bridges.

Many loads imposed on a bridge – wind, earthquakes, and vehicular traffic – can cause a bridge to experience irregular or periodic forces, which may cause bridge components to vibrate or oscillate. Some bridge components have inherent resonant frequencies to which they are particularly susceptible, and vibrations near those frequencies can cause very large stresses.

Winds can produce a variety of vibrational forces on a bridge, including flutter, galloping, and vortex shedding. Considering wind forces during the design process is especially important for long, slender bridges (typically suspension or cable-stayed bridges). If resonance issues are identified in the design process, they must be mitigated. Common techniques to address vibration include increasing the rigidity of the bridge deck by adding trusses and adding dampers to cables and towers. Neglecting to account for vibrations and oscillations can lead to bridge failure. The Tacoma Narrows Bridge collapsed in 1940 in winds of 68 km/h (42 mph), even though the bridge was designed to withstand winds up to 206 km/h (128 mph). Investigations revealed that the designer failed to account for wind-induced flutter and resonant vibrations.

Bridges can suffer severe damage when subjected to earthquake ground motions. During a seismic event, several phenomena can occur, such as long-period velocity pulses, shear cracks, large ground motions, vertical accelerations, and soil liquefaction. To mitigate risks, earthquake engineers study seismic data to classify and quantify the motions experienced by bridges. These studies are used by governments to create and revise design standards that specify the types of seismic movements that new bridges must withstand.

== Construction ==
The structural elements of a bridge are generally divided into the substructure and the superstructure. The substructure consists of the lower portions of the bridge, including the footings, (Note: The term foundation is sometimes used to represent footings, but in other contexts foundation may mean all or most of the substructure.) abutments, piers, pilings, anchorages, and bearings. The superstructure rests upon the substructure, and consists of the deck, trusses, arches, towers, cables, beams, and girders.

=== Construction process ===
Some elements of a fictional bridge. 1 Approach, 2 Arch, 3 Truss, 4 Abutment, 5 Bearing, 6 Deck and beams, 7 Pier Cap, 8 Pier, 9 Piling, 10 Footing, 11 Caisson, 12 Subsoil.

Construction of a bridge is typically managed by construction engineers, who are responsible for planning and supervising the construction process. Important aspects of this role include budgeting, scheduling, periodically conducting formal design reviews, and communicating with the bridge designers to interpret and update the design plans. (Note: An example schedule for design reviews is to hold them at 33%, 65%, 95%, and 100% of bridge completion.) When an existing bridge is being replaced or refurbished, the impact on traffic flow can have a detrimental effect on residents and services. Accelerated bridge construction processes – that focus on using pre-fabricated components and a rapid timetable – may be used to mitigate the impacts.

The forces experienced by a bridge during construction can be larger or have a different nature than the forces it will experience after completion. The bridge design process typically focuses on the strength of the fully completed bridge, but it should also consider the unusual stresses that individual elements will experience during construction. Special techniques may be required during construction to avoid excessive stresses, such as temporary supports under the bridge, temporary bracing or reinforcement, or permanently strengthening specific elements. For instance, when a cable-stayed bridge with concrete towers is complete, the towers will experience desirable compression forces from the heavy load of the cables; but during construction, without that load, the towers may experience undesirable tension forces caused by lateral winds.

=== Substructure ===
Abutments are an important element of a substructure. Beam bridges (left) direct force vertically into the abutments; some arch bridges (right) direct forces diagonally. 1 Deck, 2 Abutments, 3 Subsoil, 4 Load on bridge, 5 Force from abutment into subsoil.

Construction of all bridge types begins by creating the substructure. The first elements built are usually the footings and abutments, which are typically large blocks of reinforced concrete, entirely or partially buried underground. The footings and abutments support the entire weight of the bridge, and transfer the weight to the subsoil. Based on their height-to-width ratio, footings are categorized as: shallow (height is less than width) or deep (height is greater than width). If the subsoil cannot support the load placed on the footings, pilings must first be driven below the footings: pilings are long structures – made of wood, steel, or concrete – placed vertically below footings. Some pilings reach down and rest on bedrock; others rely on friction to prevent the footing from sinking lower.

Abutments are usually located at the ends of a bridge deck, where it reaches the subsoil. They direct the weight into the subsoil, either vertically or diagonally. Abutments may also act as retaining walls, keeping the subsoil under the approach road from eroding. After footings for the piers have been created, the piers and pier caps are built to complete the substructure. (Note: A pier cap is a block of concrete at the top of a pier, upon which rests the deck.) Suspension bridges usually require anchorages, which are large reinforced concrete blocks solidly anchored into the earth – they must be exceptionally heavy and tied into the subsoil because they must withstand the lateral pull of the large cables that hold the entire deck and live load. (Note: Self-anchored suspension bridges do not require anchorages.)

==== Constructing supports in water ====
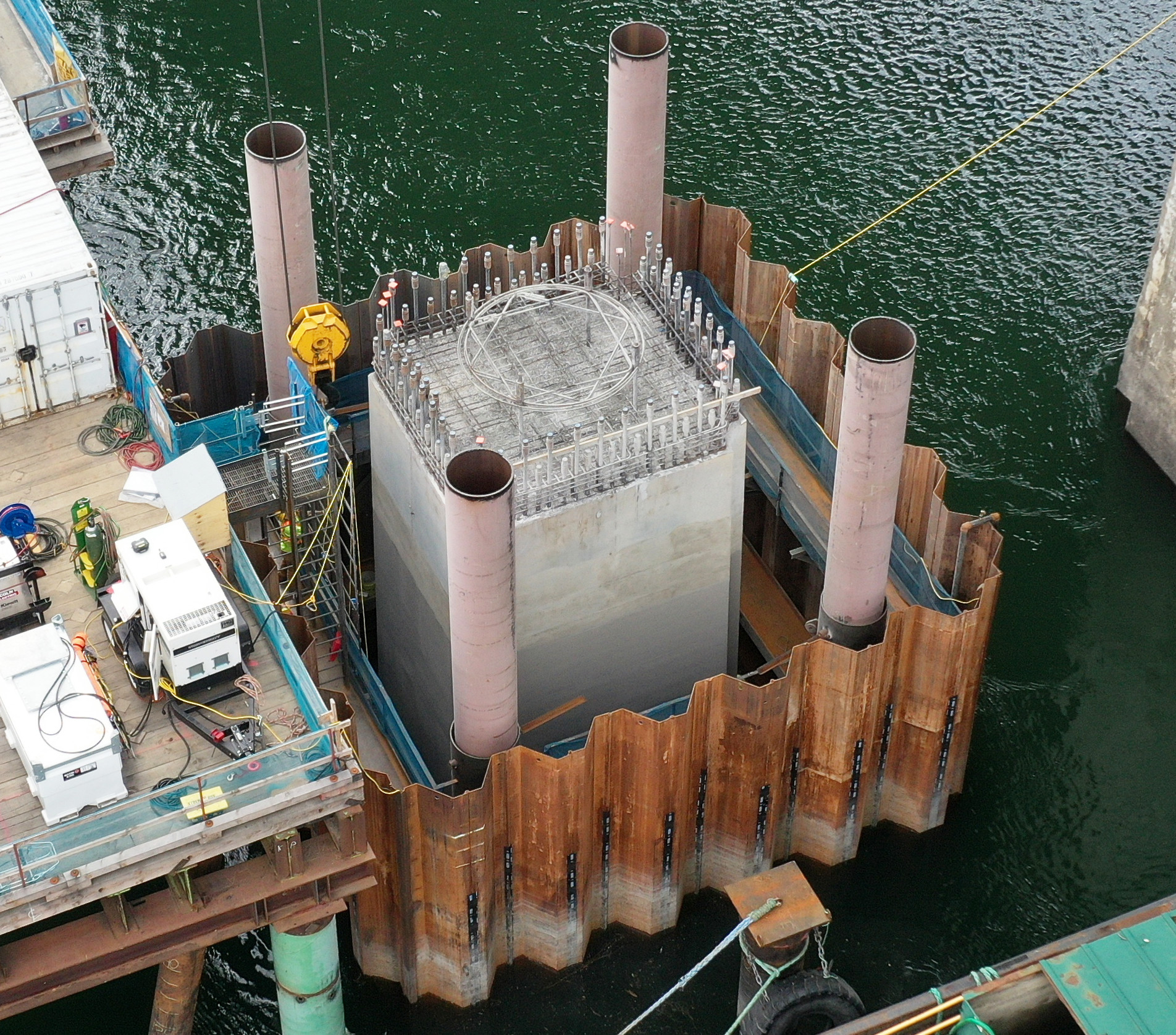
This concrete bridge pier is being built within a steel cofferdam.

When bridge supports (piers or towers) are built in a river, lake, or ocean, special technologies must be utilized. Caissons can be used to provide a workspace while constructing the submerged portion of the supports. A caisson is a large, watertight, hollow structure, open on the bottom. It is usually sunk to the bottom of the water and workers can work inside, preparing the ground for the footings. When excavation is complete, a caisson is typically filled with concrete to create all or part of the footing. Air pressure inside a sealed caisson must be kept high to prevent water from seeping in. Workers, if they do not properly decompress when exiting the caisson, can get decompression sickness. Early bridge builders did not understand decompression, and deaths were common: thirteen workers died from decompression sickness when building the Eads Bridge (completed in 1874).

Another approach for constructing foundations in water is a box caisson, which is a large steel or concrete box, open on top, which is towed by tugboats to the bridge site, then sunk to the bottom and filled with concrete. The Akashi Kaikyo suspension bridge used box caissons for its two foundations – each 70 meters (230 ft) tall and 80 meters (260 ft) in diameter. The caissons were sunk to the bottom in water 60 meters (200 ft) deep, and each was filled with 355,000 cubic meters of concrete. The foundations rest directly on the ocean bottom, without pilings or footings. An alternative to a caisson is a cofferdam, which is a temporary dam surrounding the support location, open on top, where workers may work while constructing the footings.

==== Bearings ====
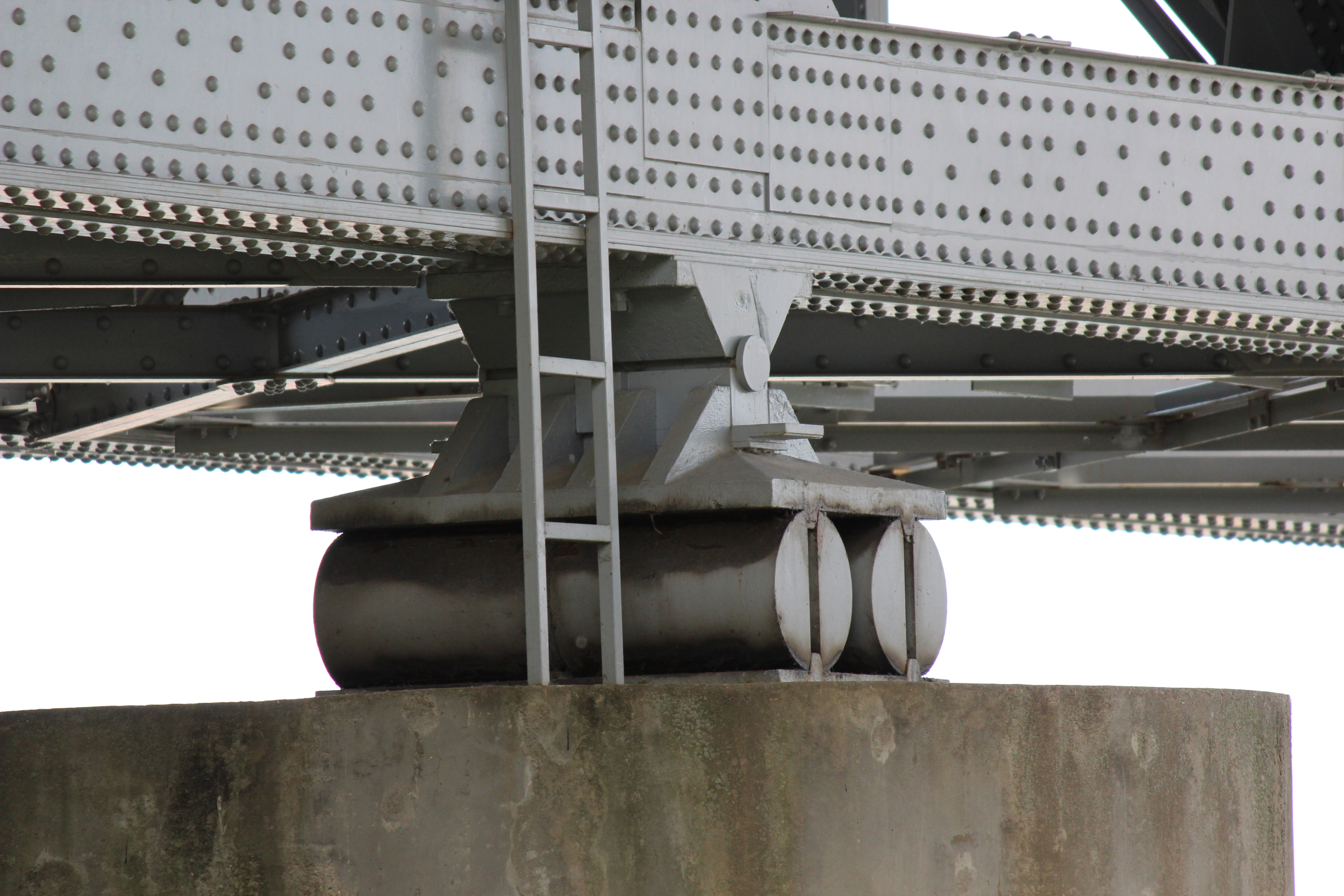
Bearings can prevent damage to the superstructure by permitting small movements.

Bearings are often placed between the superstructure and the substructure at the points of contact. Bearings are mechanical devices that enable small movements – which may result from thermal expansion and contraction, material creep, or minor seismic events. Without bearings, the bridge structure may be damaged when such movements occur. Bearings can be selected to permit small rotational or slipping movements in a specific direction, without permitting movements in other directions. Types of bearings used on bridges include hinge bearings, roller bearings, rocker bearings, sliding bearings, spring bearings, and elastomeric bearings.

=== Superstructure ===
After the substructure is complete, the superstructure is built, resting on the substructure. Beam bridge superstructures may be built in place, or fabricated off-site (precast) and transported to the bridge site. Precast beams may be placed atop the supports by a crane or gantry. If the span crosses a deep ravine, a technique known as launching may be used: the beams and deck are assembled on the approach road, then pushed horizontally across the obstacle. (Note: Incremental launching may be employed for several types of bridges: beam bridges, deck arch bridges, and cable-stay bridges with short spans. In all cases, the substructure is completed first, then the deck is pushed horizontally across the top of the substructure.)

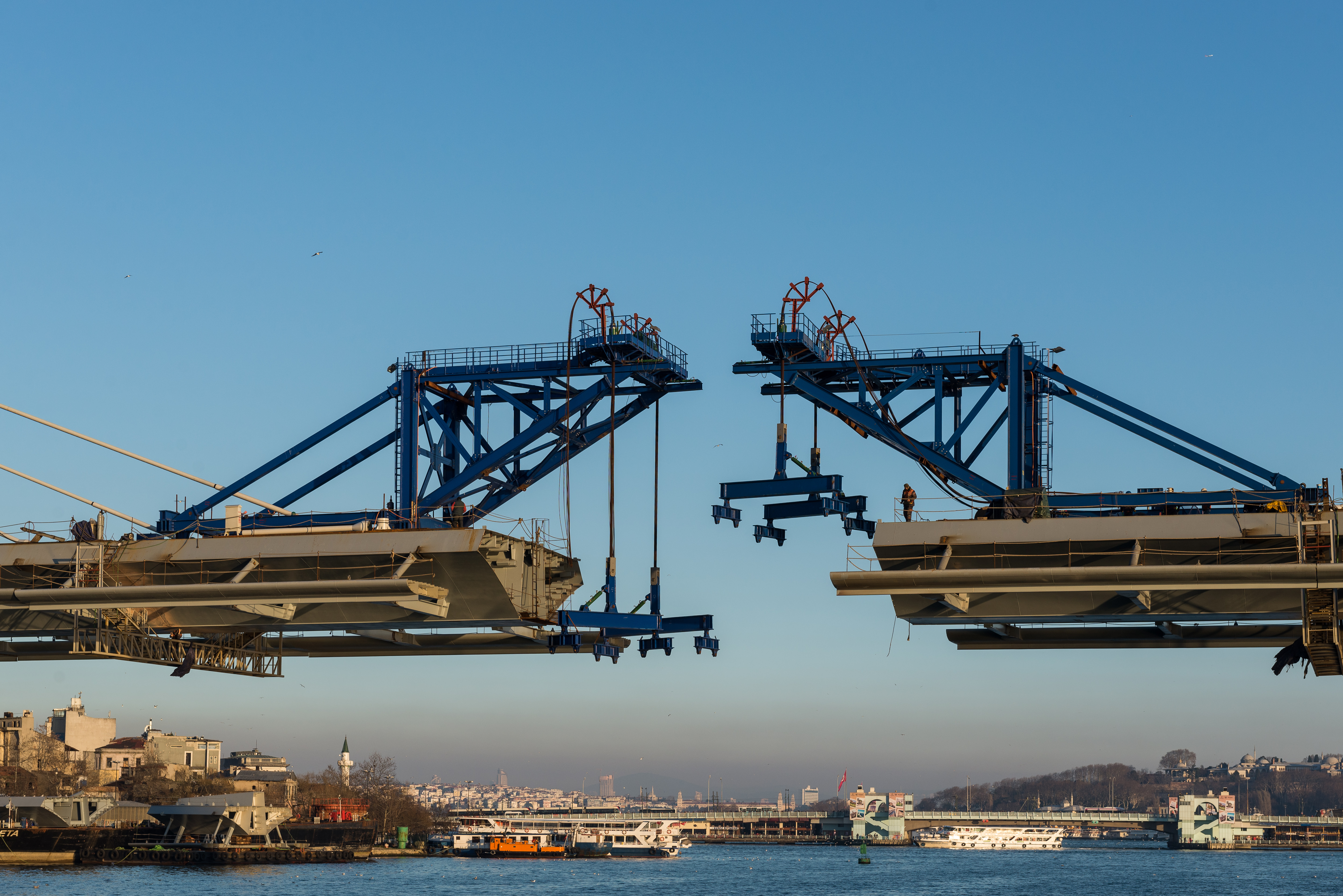
Gantries are one technique used to gradually assemble a bridge deck.

Arch bridge superstructure construction methods depend on the material. Concrete or stone arches use a temporary wood structure known as falsework or centering to support the arch while it is built. Some steel arch bridges are constructed with falsework, but others use cantilevering to build both halves out from the abutments.

Cantilever bridge superstructures are usually built incrementally by proceeding outward from anchorages or piers. Most cantilever superstructures can be built without temporary support piers, as the bridge can support itself as it extends outward. A similar process is used for steel or concrete cantilevers: prefabricated sections may be positioned at ground (or water) level and hoisted into place with a gantry, or may be transported horizontally along the previously completed portion of the cantilever. Concrete cantilevers require steel prestressing cables to be passed through tubes within each section and tightened, which will put the concrete into compression. Truss bridges are built using a variety of methods, including piece-by-piece, cantilevering, or falsework.

Cable-stayed bridge superstructures begin with the construction of one or more towers which rest directly on footings that are part of the substructure. The deck is constructed in pieces beginning at the towers and moving outward. The pieces can be put into place by hoisting, supporting from below, launching, or cantilevering from the portion of the deck that has been assembled. As each piece of the deck is added, it is connected to towers with steel cables, and the cables are tightened to take the load of the deck.

Suspension bridge superstructure construction usually begins with the towers. The towers may be steel or concrete, and rest directly on footings. The large cables are created by hauling a large pulley back and forth across the span, stringing multiple wires between the anchorages in each pass, in a process termed spinning. After the wires are spun, they are bundled together to form the cables. (Note: Spinning the wires took 209 days for the George Washington Bridge.) The cables are securely fastened to the anchorages at both ends. (Note: Some suspension bridges, called self-anchored suspension bridges, do not use anchorages.) Vertical wires called hangers are suspended from the cables, then small sections of the deck are attached to the hangers, and the sections are attached to each other.

==== Towers ====
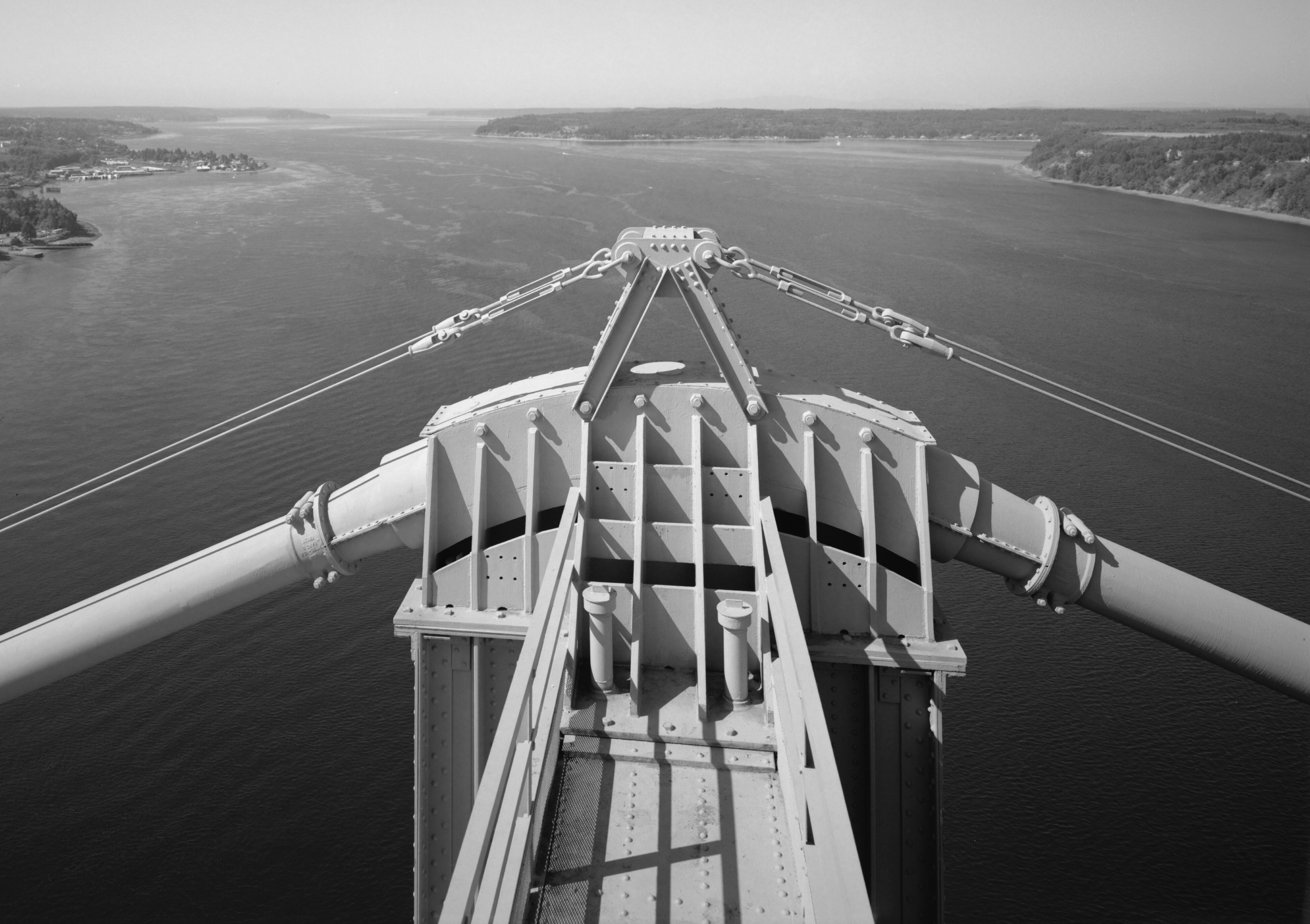
A suspension bridge cable transfers its load to the tower by resting on a curved saddle.

Towers, made of either concrete or steel, are an important component of the superstructure of cable-stayed bridges and suspension bridges. (Note: In the context of bridges, the term pylon is interchangeable with the word tower.) Concrete is generally suitable for towers up to about 250 meters (820 ft) tall, whereas steel towers can be taller. (Note: Most towers are rigidly attached to the footings below them, but some relatively short towers have bearings at their base which permit pivoting.) Towers support the bridge cables, which hold the weight of the deck and the traffic. Most of the load imposed on a tower is applied vertically downward on the tower, rather than sideways. Towers experience a compression stress, in contrast to cables, which experience a tension stress. There are two mechanisms used to attach a cable to a tower: saddles or anchors. Saddles are curved structures which allow a cable to pass through (or over the top of) a tower. An anchor holds the end of a cable. Saddles are often used in suspension bridges, and anchors are often used in cable-stayed bridges.

==== Cables ====
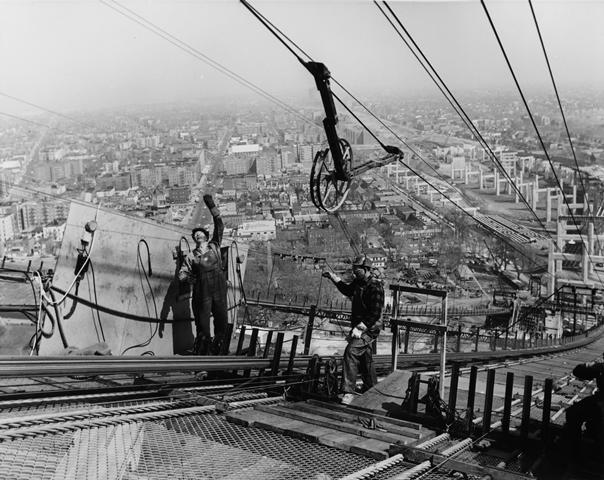
A spinning wheel pulls two wires at a time to gradually build up a suspension bridge cable.

Steel cables are an element of both cable-stayed bridges and suspension bridges. Cables are made of one or more strands, and each strand consists of multiple wires. A wire is a thin, flexible piece of solid steel, of higher tensile strength than normal steel, and with a diameter of 3mm to 7mm. (Note: The number of wires in a strand is typically 37 to 127 (for prefabricated strand construction) and 200 to 500 (for air-spinning construction).) Cables are typically constructed at the bridge site by unspooling wires or strands from large reels. Large suspension bridges may use cables that are over 1 meter (3 ft 3 in) in diameter and weigh over 20,000 tonnes (44,092,450 lb).

Before building the cables of a suspension bridge, temporary catwalks must be constructed to support the wires while they are drawn across the span and over the tops of the towers. There are two approaches to pulling the wires across the span: the air spinning method (in which individual wires are carried across by pulleys); and the prefabricated strand method (in which entire strands are pulled across). (Note: The prefabricated method is sometimes called the prefabricated parallel-wire strands (PPWS) method.)

The air spinning method was used for all suspension bridges until the prefabricated strand method was invented in the 1960s. After 300 to 500 wires are pulled, aluminum bands are used to bundle them into strands. (Note: For large suspension bridges, the length of wire or strand on a reel may not reach across the full span, so when a reel reaches its end, the wires (or strands) must be spliced to the wires (or strands) of a new reel.) The wires within a strand may be parallel, or they may wrap around each other in a twisted (spiral) pattern. Air spinning always produces strands that contain parallel wires. The prefabricated strand method can utilize strands with parallel or twisted wires. (Note: The prefabricated strand method was used for the Akashi Kaikyo Bridge, where each strand weighed 94 tonnes (207,230 lb) and was 4 kilometers (2.5 mi) long.)

==== Deck ====
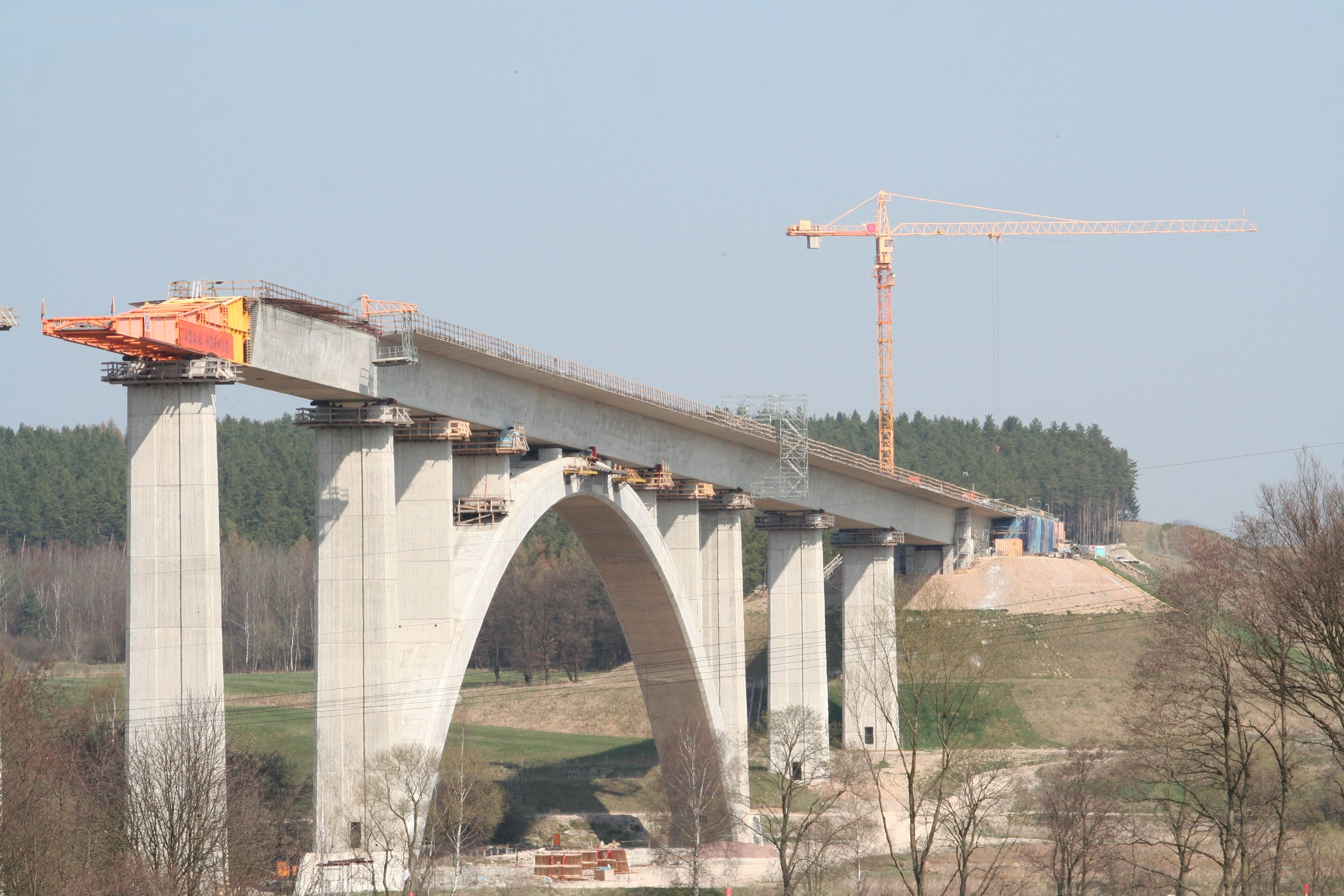
The deck of this arch bridge is being horizontally pushed onto the substructure with jacks.

The deck of a bridge is the flat, horizontal surface that extends across the full span of a bridge. Decks generally rest on beams or box girders. When a deck is rigidly attached to its supporting beams or girders, they function together as a single structure. Two common types of decks are concrete decks and orthotropic steel decks. (Note: Some bridges use both types of deck: concrete in some parts of the bridge, and orthotropic steel in other parts. Other materials (in addition to concrete and steel plates) used to build decks include wood planks and open steel gratings.) Concrete decks are flat slabs of reinforced concrete. The slabs may precast off-site, or cast-in-place by pouring concrete into forms on the bridge superstructure. (Note: An advantage of pre-cast slabs is that – after bridge construction – they do not shrink or creep as much as cast-in-place slabs.) Orthotropic steel decks consist of a flat steel plate, coated with a wearing surface. Numerous small steel ribs are welded to the underside of the top plate, running in the direction of the bridge roadway. (Note: Orthotropic means (a) the ribs are perpendicular to the crosswise floor beams (orthogonal); and (b) the ribs are more closely spaced than the crosswise floor beams (anisotropic).) Below the ribs are steel floor beams, placed crosswise to the ribs. (Note: Floor beams are small beams that cross the width of the bridge, and rest on larger beams that run lengthwise and span the full distance between bridge supports.) Orthotropic steel decks are more expensive than concrete steel decks, but weigh less. They are useful in applications where weight is critical, a thin deck is required, or the environment is subject to earthquakes or extreme cold weather.

Many decks have a wearing surface on top, which is a layer of material designed to be periodically replaced after it is worn away by vehicular traffic. Wearing surfaces are typically made of aggregate (small rocks) mixed with a binder such as asphalt, polyurethane, epoxy resins, or polyester. (Note: Wearing surfaces are essential for steel decks, but a concrete deck often acts as its own wearing surface. Concrete decks must be designed to accommodate the weight of a future addition of a wearing surface, which will be applied when the concrete wears down due to vehicular traffic.) Railway bridge decks are categorized as open decks (the ties rest directly on beams or girders, with air gaps between) and ballast decks (the ties rest on ballast rocks, and the ballast rests on a deck slab).

Constructing the deck (and its supporting beams or girders) can be difficult when the bridge is over water or a deep valley. A variety of techniques are available, and the choice depends on the topography of the site, the deck material (concrete or steel), traffic or obstacles under the bridge, and whether sections can be built off-site and transported to the bridge. Methods of deck construction include building atop temporary supports, jacking up from the ground, incremental launching (building the entire deck on the approach road and pushing it horizontally), lifting from below with a hoist mounted on the bridge, cantilevering (incrementally extending the deck, starting from towers or abutments), and lifting with a floating crane.

=== Protection ===
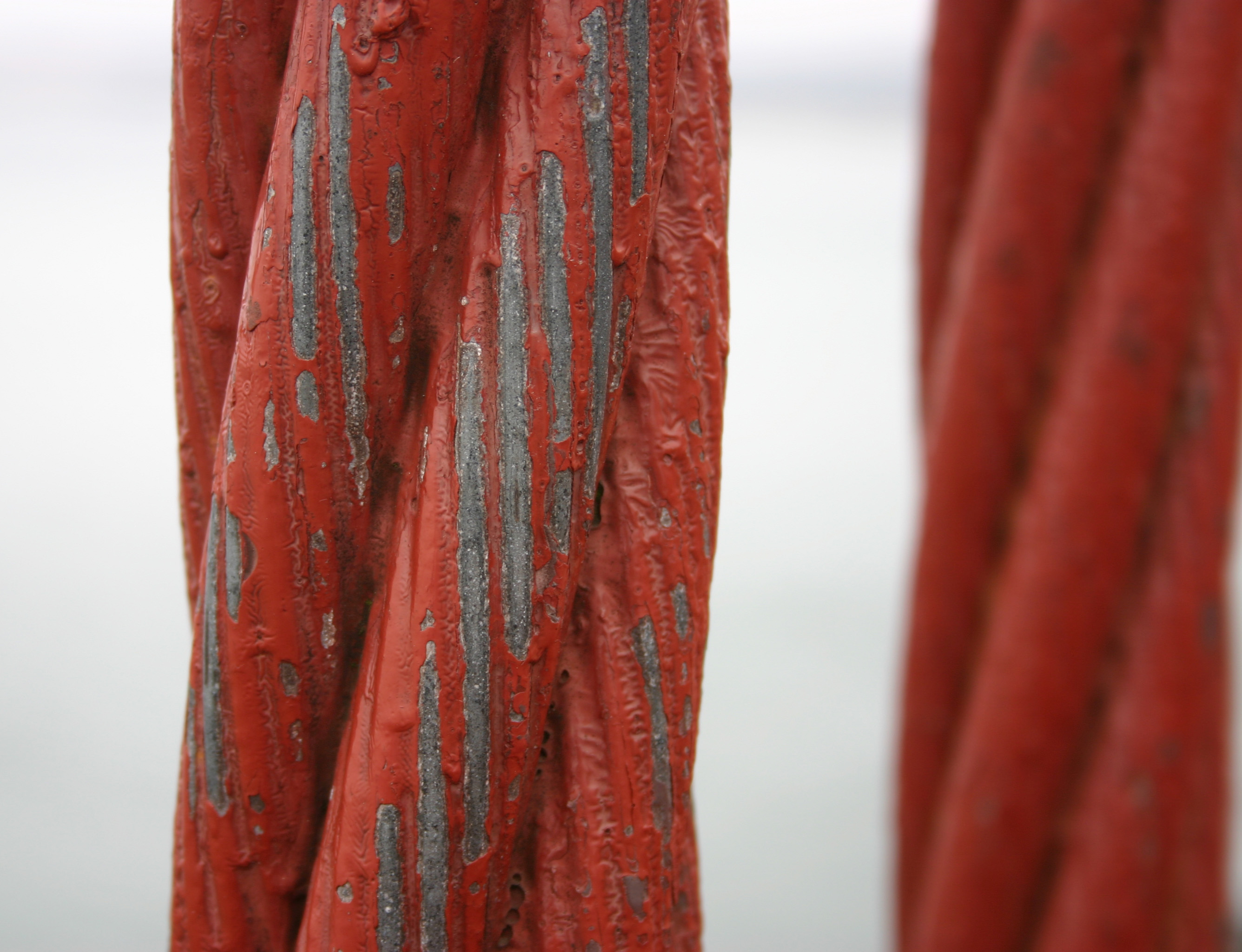
Paint can be used to reduce deterioration of steel components. Steel bridges need to be repainted periodically, as seen in this wire hanger from the Golden Gate Bridge, which is painted international orange.

To achieve the designed service life, a bridge must be protected from deterioration by incorporating certain features into the design. Bridges can deteriorate due to a variety of causes, including rust, corrosion, chemical actions, and mechanical abrasion. Deterioration is sometimes visible as rust on steel components, or cracks and spalling in concrete. Deterioration can be slowed with various measures, primarily aimed at excluding water and oxygen from the bridge elements. Techniques to prevent water-based damage include drainage systems, waterproofing membranes (such as polymer films), and eliminating expansion joints. (Note: Expansion joints relieve stress due to thermal expansion and contraction, but permit water to seep into vulnerable bridge elements, which can lead to corrosion and degradation. Integral bridge concepts are an alternative to expansion joints.) Concrete bridge elements can be protected with waterproof seals and coatings. (Note: Concrete can deteriorate by the process of carbonatation, or by penetration of chloride ions, typically from salt. The salt may come from ocean water, or from road salt applied during winter de-icing procedures.) Reinforcing steel within concrete can be protected by using high-quality concrete and increasing the thickness of the concrete surrounding the steel. Steel elements of a bridge can be protected by paints or by galvanizing with zinc. Paint can be avoided entirely for steel members by using stainless steel or weathering steel (a steel alloy that eliminates the need for paint, by forming a protective outer layer of rust).

Bridge scour is a potentially serious problem when bridge footings are located in water. Currents in the water can cause the sand and rocks around and below the footings to wash away over time. This effect can be mitigated by placing a cofferdam around the footings, or surrounding the footings with large, carefully placed rocks. (Note: As an example of measures taken to combat scour: the underwater foundations of the Akashi Kaikyo Bridge are surrounded with rip rap 8 meters (26 ft) thick.) Suspension bridges and cable-stayed bridges have large cables containing hundreds of steel wires. Several techniques are used to minimize corrosion inside the cables, including wrapping the cables with galvanized wire, injecting the cables with grout or epoxy, using interlocking S-profile wires, and circulating dry air through the interior of the cable. Bridges with supports in navigable waterways are designed to withstand ship strikes up to a specific, predefined magnitude. In addition to waterway markings and pilot warning systems, bridge supports in water may be surrounded by physical protections such as fenders, pilings, or small artificial islands.

== Operation and financing ==
=== Management ===
After a bridge is completed and becomes operational, management processes are employed to ensure that it remains open to traffic, avoids safety incidents, and achieves its intended lifespan. These processes – collectively referred to as bridge management – include technical activities – namely, maintenance, inspection, monitoring, and testing. In addition to technical tasks, management encompasses planning, budgeting, and prioritization of maintenance activities. Bridge managers use bridge management systems and life-cycle cost analysis methodologies to manage a bridge and estimate the maintenance costs of a bridge throughout its lifetime. Annual maintenance costs increase as the bridge ages and degrades.

=== Maintenance ===
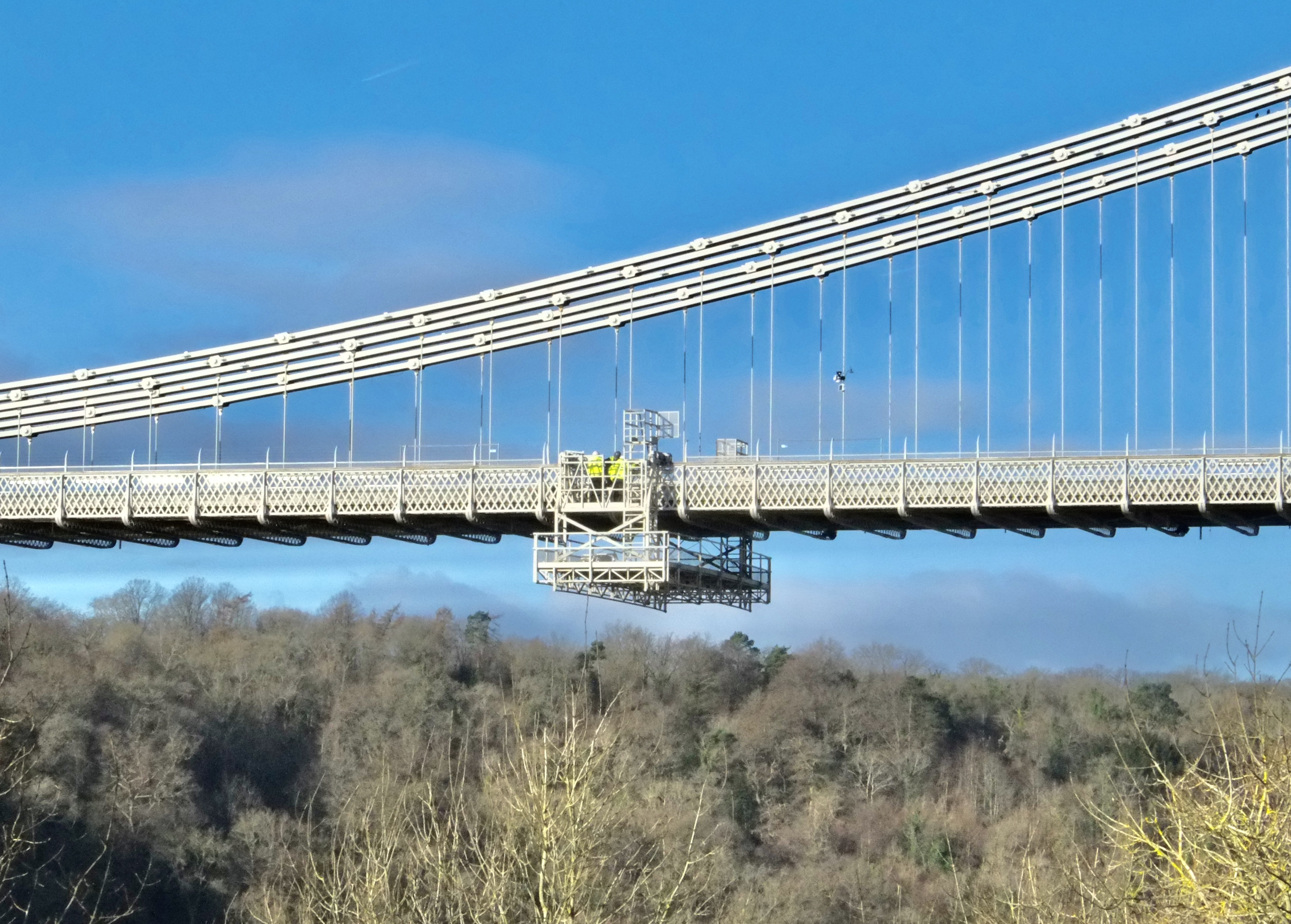
A crew of workers are using a maintenance traveler (the mobile cage structure) to inspect the Clifton Suspension Bridge.

Maintenance activities seek to prolong the life of the bridge, reduce lifecycle costs, and ensure the safety of the community. Maintenance tasks can be categorized as corrective tasks and preventive tasks. Corrective tasks are implemented in response to unexpected issues that arise, for example, repairing structural elements (piers, beams, girders, towers, or cables) and replacing bearings.

Preventive tasks include washing, painting, lubricating bearings, sealing the deck, filling cracks, removing snow, filling potholes, and repairing minor issues with structures and electrical fixtures. Some preventive tasks are performed on a periodic schedule. An example schedule for periodic bridge maintenance tasks is: washing entire structure (1–2 years); sealing deck surface (4–6 years); lubricating bearings (4 years); painting steel bridge components (12–15 years); replacing the deck's wearing surface (12 years); sealing sidewalks (5 years); filling cracks (4 years); and cleaning drains (2 years).

=== Inspection and monitoring ===
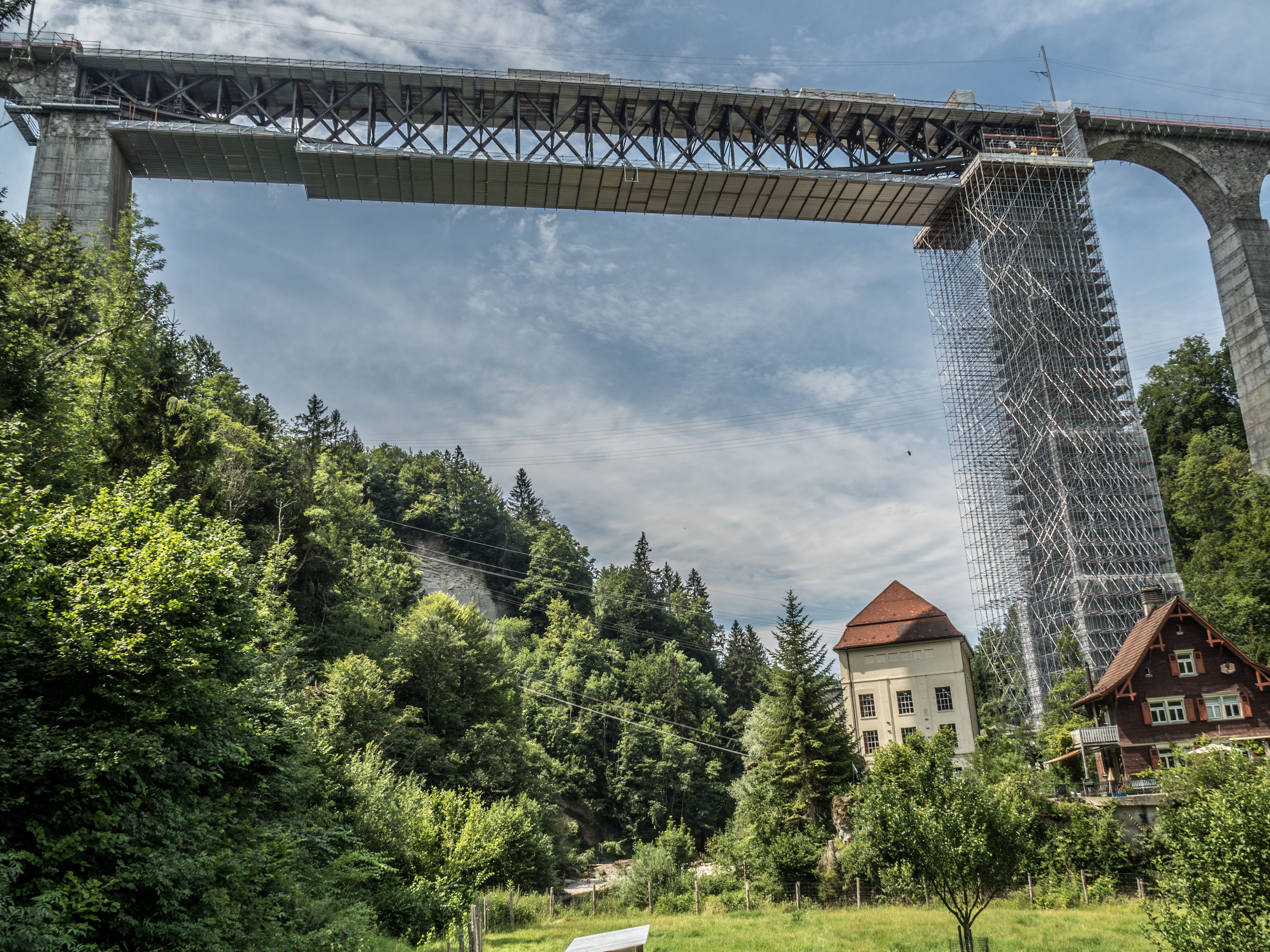
Scaffolding is erected under the Sitterviadukt rail bridge in Switzerland while maintenance on the deck truss is performed.

An important part of maintenance is inspecting a bridge for damage or degradation, and taking steps to mitigate any issues detected. Degradation can come from environmental sources, including expansion/contraction from freeze/thaw cycles, rain, oxidation of steel, and sea spray. Human activities may also cause damage, for example: vehicular traffic, mechanical abrasion, poor bridge design, and improper repair procedures. Some countries mandate periodic inspection schedules, for example, routine inspections every 24 months, or inspecting underwater foundations for scouring every 60 months.

Relying solely on visual inspection to assess degradation of a bridge can be unreliable, so inspectors use a variety of nondestructive testing techniques. These techniques include hammer strike tests, ultrasonic pulse velocity tests, seismic tomography, and ground penetrating radar. Various electrical tests that assess permeability and resistance can give insight into the condition of surface concrete. X-rays can be passed through concrete to obtain data about concrete density and condition. Videography using slender probes can be used where access is available. Measurements of the state of a bridge may be made automatically and periodically using structural health monitoring (SHM) technologies. Some testing – termed destructive testing – requires removing samples from the bridge and taking them to a laboratory for analysis with microscopes, sonic devices, or X-ray diffraction. Destructive testing is performed by removing cores drilled from concrete, or a small piece of steel wire cut from a cable.

=== Financing ===
Funding for bridge construction and operation comes from a variety of sources, including fuel taxes, annual vehicle registration fees, tolls, congestion fees, and usage fees based on satellite tracking. Some bridges – particularly in developing countries – are financed by international sources including the World Bank or China's Belt and Road Initiative. Toll systems are generally an inefficient mechanism for collecting funding, particularly when tollbooths are used, because they are expensive to build and manage. Tollbooths can slow down traffic and interfere with the construction of entry or exit points.

The cost of building a bridge is typically borne by government agencies, but since 1990 an increasing number of bridges are built and paid for by private companies using a public–private partnership (PPP) agreement. In a PPP project, the government grants the right to build the bridge to a company, and the company recoups its expenses by collecting tolls for a fixed period of time. (Note: Some PPP agreements specify that the agreement terminates at the end of the fixed period, or when the private company recoups its expenses, whichever comes first. See also the build–operate–transfer financing method.) At the end of the period, the bridge is transferred to government ownership, and the government may choose to continue to charge tolls or not. Notable bridges constructed with a PPP model include the Queen Elizabeth II Bridge (built in 1991, toll collection period 20 years) and the Second Severn Crossing (built in 1996, toll collection period 30 years).

=== Failures ===
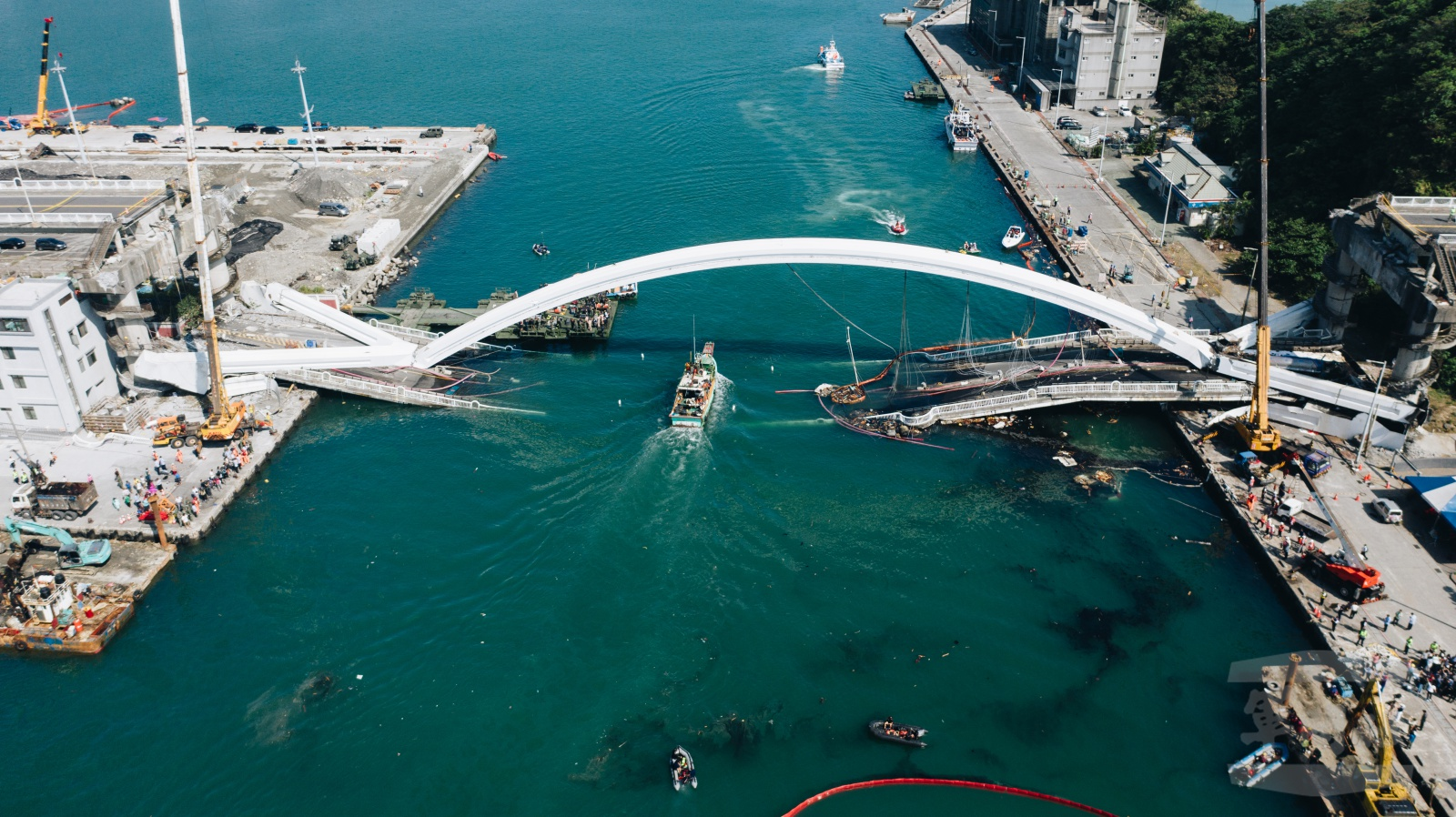
The Nanfang'ao Bridge in Taiwan collapsed because of excessive corrosion that went undetected.

Bridge failures are of special importance to structural engineers, because the analyses of the failures provide lessons learned that serve to improve design and construction processes. Bridge failures have a variety of causes, which can be categorized as natural factors (flood, scour, earthquake, landslide, and wind) and human factors (improper design and construction method, collision, overloading, fire, corrosion, and lack of inspection and maintenance). Over time, bridge failures have led to significant improvements in bridge design, construction, and maintenance practices. Before the advent of bridge engineering procedures based on rigorous, scientific principles, bridges frequently failed. Failures were most common in the mid-19th century, when the rapidly expanding railway networks were building hundreds of new bridges every year around the globe. In the United States, 40 bridges per year failed in the 1870s, amounting to 25% of all bridges built in that decade.

In the modern era, in spite of advances in bridge engineering methodologies, bridge failures continue to occur regularly. In Australia, the King Street Bridge collapsed in 1962, a year after opening, due to improper welding techniques. In Palau, the Koror–Babeldaob Bridge collapsed in 1996, three months after a repair operation made major changes to the bridge. In 1998, the Turag-Bhakurta Bridge in Bangladesh collapsed due to river waters scouring away the soil around the bridge supports. The Millennium Bridge in London opened in 2000, but closed two days later due to excessive swaying. It did not open until two years later – after dampers were installed. About half of all bridge failures in the early 21st century in the US were due to flood damage or scouring (water currents undermining the bridge supports).

== Society and culture ==
=== Signature bridges ===
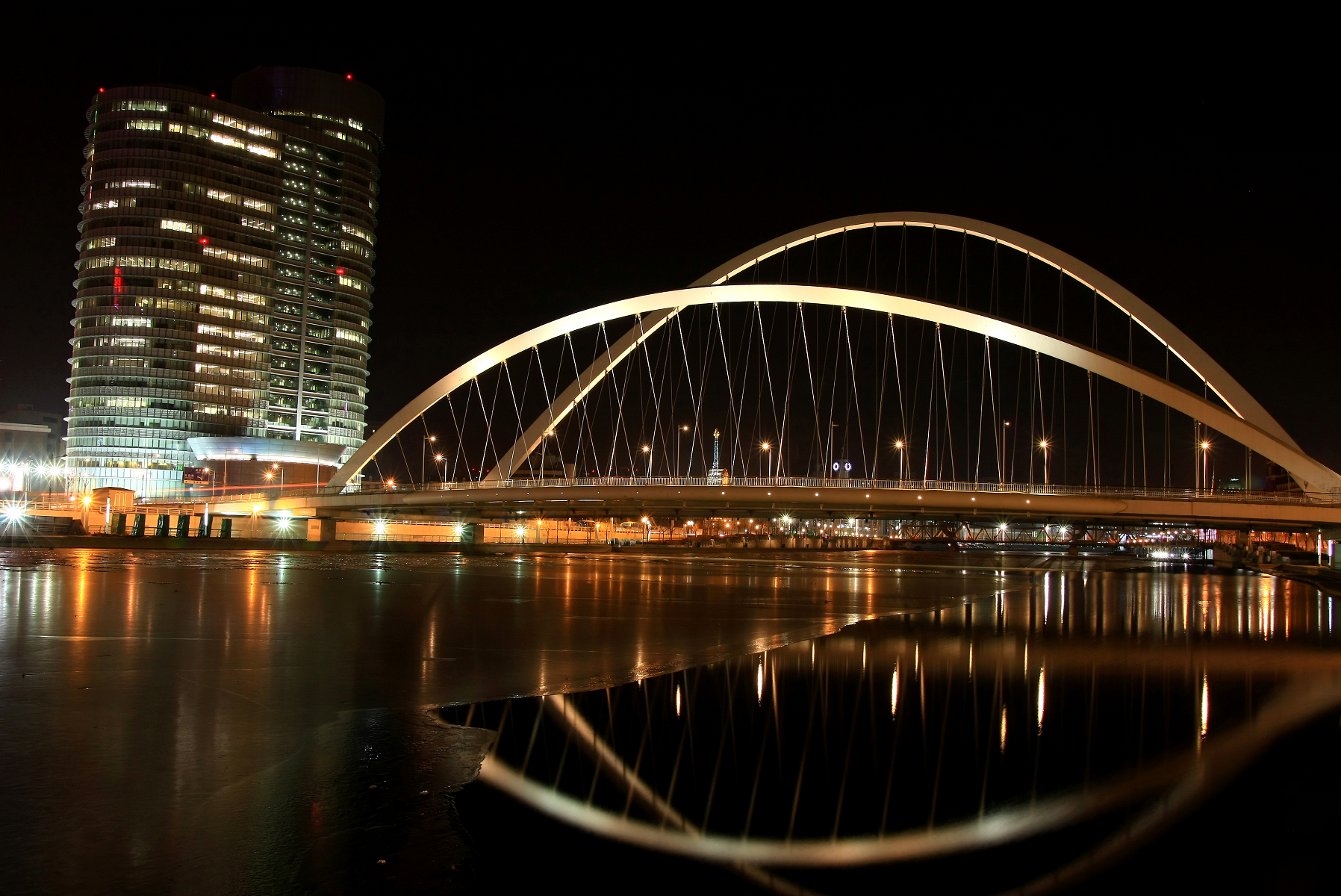
The Dagu Bridge in China was designed to be a signature bridge.

Many bridges – known as signature bridges – are strongly identified with a particular community. (Note: Most signature bridges are roadway bridges or pedestrian bridges; railways rarely construct signature bridges.) Large suspension bridges, in particular, are often regarded as iconic landmarks that symbolize the cities in which they are located. Notable examples include the Brooklyn Bridge in New York; the Golden Gate Bridge in San Francisco; the Clifton Suspension Bridge in Bristol; and the Széchenyi Chain Bridge in Budapest. (Note: Some large cable-stayed bridges also have iconic designs.) Some visually impressive bridges, such as the Dagu Bridge in China, are designed with the express goal of creating a landmark for the host city. Dan Cruickshank notes that some bridges have the ability to "transform a place a community and ... can make its mark on the landscape and in men's minds, capture the imagination, engender pride and sense of identity and define a time and place."

=== Economic and environmental impact ===
Bridges can have significant impacts – both positive and negative – on a community's environment, society, and economy. During the bridge design process, these effects may be modeled with life cycle sustainability assessment or building information modeling, and the results can be used to adjust the bridge's design to improve its effect on the environment, society, and economy.

Positive effects of a new bridge can include shorter transport times, employment opportunities, improvements to social equity, improved productivity, and increases to the gross domestic product (GDP). Construction of a new bridge can increase wages in the surrounding region, but can also increase income inequity between genders (men see larger wage gains than women) and between education levels (higher-educated persons see more gains than lower-educated persons). In locales where flooding is common, bridges can increase overall income by providing reliable crossings across rivers. In underdeveloped regions with mountainous topography, construction of bridges that cross deep valleys can bring major benefits to the communities they connect. Without bridges, such areas often have a core region that is more prosperous, surrounded by less developed peripheral regions. Building bridges over deep valleys can reduce developmental disparities between areas, as well as generate economic development, and improve accessibility to goods and services.

Global warming can be exacerbated by the creation of a new bridge, because the production of concrete significantly contributes to the greenhouse effect. (Note: Bridges often utilize large amounts of concrete, which is a major source of carbon dioxide, a gas that contributes to the greenhouse effect.) Although bridges can boost the economy of the surrounding region, they also increase environmental pollution proportionally. Corruption endemic in the construction industry (including bridge building) can produce negative societal and economic consequences. Bridges that carry highways can result in increased vehicular collisions, which have economic costs (medical care and lost productivity) averaging over €14,000 each.

=== Suicide ===
Suicides are sometimes carried out by jumping off bridges. This method can account for 20% to 70% of suicides in urban areas with access to tall bridges. (Note: In general, less than 10% of suicides are from jumping.) In some regions, suicide by jumping disproportionately affects young adults, who tend to have lower inhibitory control. Specific bridges can gain notoriety and attract persons experiencing a suicidal crisis, which creates a feedback loop. High-risk bridges often have suicide prevention barriers installed, (Note: Arguments against installing suicide prevention measures include cost, aesthetics, and questions of effectiveness.) which dramatically decrease the suicide rate on the bridge. (Note: Many bridges have installed barriers to prevent suicide. The heights range from 2 meters (6.6 ft) to 5 meters (16 ft), and are generally successful at reducing suicide rates.) Installing barriers on a high-risk bridge generally reduces the jumping suicide rate in a region, although in some instances, other bridges become substitutes.

=== Profession and regulation ===
The profession of civil engineering – which includes the discipline of bridge building – began to be formalized in the 18th century when a school of engineering was created in France within the Corps des Ponts et Chaussées at the École de Paris, under the direction of Jacques Gabriel. In 1747 the first school dedicated to bridge building was founded: the École Nationale des Ponts et Chaussées led by French engineers Daniel-Charles Trudaine and Jean-Rodolphe Perronet. The first professional organization focused on civil engineering was the Institution of Civil Engineers founded in 1818 in the UK, initially led by Thomas Telford.

In the modern era, bridge engineering is regulated by national organizations, such as the National Council of Examiners for Engineering and Surveying (US), the Canadian Council of Professional Engineers (Canada), and the Engineering Council (UK). In many countries, bridge engineers must be licensed or meet minimal educational requirements. Some countries require engineers to pass qualification examinations, for example, in the US engineers must pass the Fundamentals of Engineering exam followed by the Principles and Practice of Engineering exam. In Poland, bridge engineers are required to obtain certification by accumulating several years of experience under a senior engineer, and passing an exam administered by the Polish Chamber of Civil Engineers. International cooperation in the field of engineering is facilitated by the World Federation of Engineering Organizations.

=== Art and culture ===
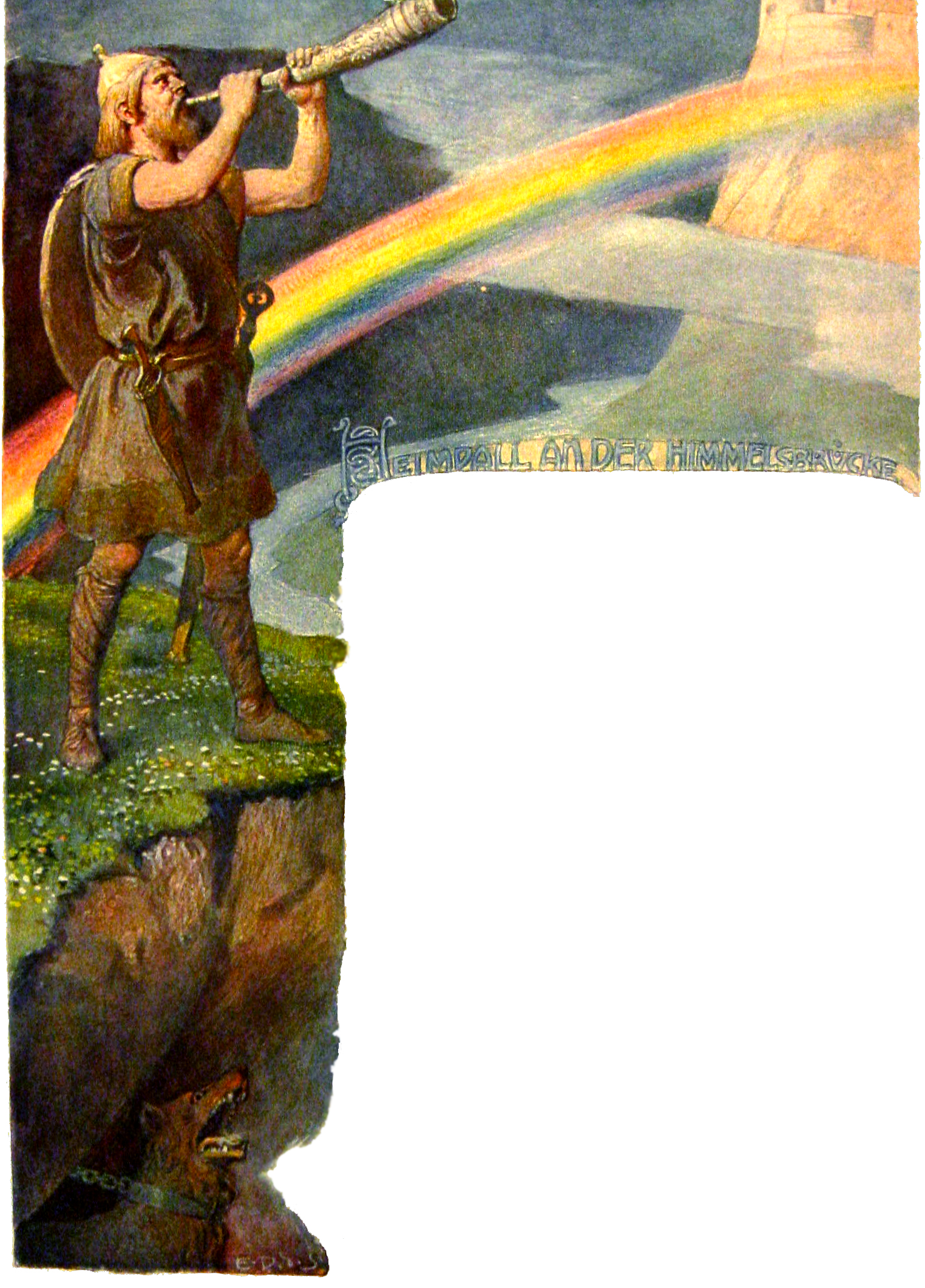
In Norse mythology, the Bifröst rainbow bridge connects Earth with Asgard.

Reaching for the world, as our lives do,
As all lives do, reaching that we may give
The best of what we are and hold as true:
Always it is by bridges that we live.

— Philip Larkin "Bridge for the Living" (1981)

Bridges occur extensively in art, legend, and literature, often employed as metaphors or symbols of human accomplishment, lifespan, or experience. In Norse mythology, the home of the gods – Asgard – is connected to the earth by Bifröst, a rainbow bridge. Many bridges in Europe are named Devil's Bridge, and in some cases have folkloric stories that explain why the bridge is associated with the devil. Christian legend holds that St. Bénézet lifted a huge boulder to begin construction of the Pont Saint-Bénézet bridge, and went on to found the apocryphal Bridge-Building Brotherhood. Bridges feature prominently in paintings – often in the background – as in the Mona Lisa.

In the modern era, bridges continue to feature prominently in culture. Bridges are often the setting for pageants, celebrations, and processions. Authors have used bridges as the centerpiece of novels, notably The Bridge on the Drina by Ivo Andrić and Thornton Wilder's The Bridge of San Luis Rey. British poet Philip Larkin, inspired by the construction of the Humber Bridge near his home, wrote "Bridge for the Living" in 1981. Neighboring nations have chosen to designate some shared bridges as friendship bridges or peace bridges. (Note: See this list of bridges with "friendship" in the name, and this list of bridges with "peace" in the name.) In 1996, the European Commission held a competition to select art for the euro banknotes. Robert Kalina, an Austrian designer, won with a set of illustrations of bridges, chosen because they symbolize links between states in the union and paths to the future.
