= List of EN standards =

European Standards (abbreviated EN, from the German name Europäische Norm ("European standard")) are technical standards drafted and maintained by CEN (European Committee for Standardization), CENELEC (European Committee for Electrotechnical Standardization) and ETSI (European Telecommunications Standards Institute).

== EN 1–999 ==
- EN 1: Flued oil stoves with vaporizing burners
- EN 2: Classification of fires
- EN 3: Portable fire extinguishers
- EN 14: Dimensions of bed blankets
- EN 19: Industrial valves – Marking of metallic valves
- EN 20: Wood preservatives.
- EN 26: Gas-fired instantaneous water heaters for the production of domestic hot water
- EN 40: Lighting columns
  - EN 40-1: Part 1: Definitions and terms
  - EN 40-2: Part 2: General requirements and dimensions
  - EN 40-3-1: Part 3-1: Design and verification - Specification for characteristic loads
  - EN 40-3-2: Part 3-2: Design and verification - Verification by testing
  - EN 40-3-3: Part 3-3: Design and verification - Verification by calculation
  - EN 40-4: Part 4: Requirements for reinforced and prestressed concrete lighting columns
  - EN 40-5: Part 5: Requirements for steel lighting columns
  - EN 40-6: Part 6: Requirements for aluminium lighting columns
  - EN 40-7: Part 7: Requirements for fibre reinforced polymer composite lighting columns
- EN 54: Fire detection and fire alarm systems
- EN 71: Safety of toys
- EN 81: Safety of lifts and escalators
- EN 115: Safety of escalators & Moving walks
- EN 124: Gully tops and manhole tops for vehicular and pedestrian areas
- EN 131: Ladders
- EN 136: Respiratory protective devices – Full-face masks – Requirements, testing and marking
- EN 137: Respiratory protective devices – Self-contained open-circuit compressed air breathing apparatus with full face mask – Requirements, testing, marking
- EN 140: Respiratory protective devices – Half masks and quarter masks – Requirements, testing, marking
- EN 142: Respiratory protective devices – Mouthpiece assemblies – Requirements, testing, marking
- EN 143: Respiratory protective devices – Particle filters – Requirements, testing, marking
- EN 144: Respiratory protective devices – Gas cylinder valves
  - EN 144-1: Part 1: Thread connections for insert connector
  - EN 144-2: Part 2: Outlet connections
  - EN 144-3: Part 3: Outlet connections for diving gases Nitrox and oxygen
- EN 145 Respiratory protective devices – Self-contained closed-circuit breathing apparatus compressed oxygen or compressed oxygen-nitrogen type – Requirements, testing, marking
- EN 148 Respiratory protective devices – Threads for facepieces
  - EN 148-1: Part 1: Standard thread connection
  - EN 148-2: Part 2: Centre thread connection
  - EN 148-3: Part 3: Tread connection M 45 x 3
- EN 149: Respiratory protective devices – Filtering half masks to protect against particles – Requirements, testing, marking
- EN 166: Personal eye-protection – Specifications
- EN 169: Personal eye-protection – Filters for welding and related techniques – Transmittance requirements and recommended use
- EN 170: Personal eye-protection – Ultraviolet filters – Transmittance requirements and recommended use
- EN 172: Personal eye protection – Sunglare filters for industrial use
- EN 174: Personal eye-protection – Ski goggles for downhill skiing
- EN 175: Personal protection – Equipment for eye and face protection during welding and allied processes
- EN 196: Methods for testing cement (10 parts)
- EN 197-1: Cement – Part 1 : Composition, specifications and conformity criteria for common cements
- EN 197-2: Cement – Part 2 : Conformity evaluation
- EN 206-1: Concrete – Part 1: Specification, performance, production and conformity
- EN 207: Personal eye-protection equipment – Filters and eye-protectors against laser radiation (laser eye-protectors)
- EN 208: Personal eye-protection – Eye-protectors for adjustment work on lasers and laser systems (laser adjustment eye-protectors)
- EN 228: Specifications for automotive petrol
- EN 250: Respiratory equipment – Open-circuit self-contained compressed air diving apparatus - Requirements, testing and marking
- EN 280: Mobile elevating work platforms. Design calculations, Stability criteria, Construction, Safety Examinations and tests
- EN 286: Simple unfired pressure vessels designed to contain air or nitrogen
  - Part 3: Steel pressure vessels designed for air braking equipment and auxiliary pneumatic equipment for railway rolling stock
  - Part 4: Aluminium alloy pressure vessels designed for air braking equipment and auxiliary pneumatic equipment for railway rolling stock
- EN 287: Qualification test of welders — Fusion welding
  - Part 1: Steels
- EN 294: Safety of machinery; safety distances to prevent danger zones from being reached by the upper limbs
- EN 298: Automatic gas burner control systems for gas burners and gas burning appliances with or without fans
- EN 301 549: European standard for digital accessibility
- EN 336: Structural timber — Sizes, permitted deviations
- EN 338: Structural timber — Strength classes
- EN 341: Personal protective equipment against falls from a height. Descender devices
- EN 342: Protective clothing – Ensembles and garments for protection against cold
- EN 343: Protective clothing – Protection against rain
- EN 352: Hearing protectors – General requirements
  - EN 352-1: Part 1: Earmuffs
  - EN 352-2: Part 2: Earplugs
  - EN 352-3: Part 3: Earmuffs attached to head protection and/or face protection devices
- EN 352: Hearing protectors – Safety requirements
  - EN 352-4: Part 4: Level-dependent earmuffs
  - EN 352-5: Part 5: Active noise reduction earmuffs
  - EN 352-6: Part 6: Earmuffs with safety-related audio input
  - EN 352-7: Part 7: Level-dependent earplugs
  - EN 352-8: Part 8: Entertainment audio earmuffs
  - EN 352-9: Part 9: Earplugs with safety-related audio input
  - EN 352-10: Part 10: Entertainment audio earplugs
- EN 353-1: Personal fall protection equipment – Guided type fall arresters including an anchor line – Part 1: Guided type fall arresters including a rigid anchor line
- EN 353-2: Personal protective equipment against falls from a height – Part 2: Guided type fall arresters including a flexible anchor line
- EN 354: Personal fall protection equipment – Lanyards
- EN 355: Personal protective equipment against falls from a height – Energy absorbers
- EN 358: Personal protective equipment for work positioning and prevention of falls from a height – Belts and lanyards for work positioning or restraint
- EN 360: Personal fall protection equipment – Retractable type fall arresters
- EN 361: Personal protective equipment against falls from a height – Full body harnesses
- EN 362: Personal protective equipment against falls from a height – Connectors
- EN 363: Personal protective equipment against falls from a height – Fall arrest systems
- EN 365: Personal protective equipment against falls from a height – General requirements for instructions for use, maintenance, periodic examination, repair, marking and packaging
- EN ISO 374: Protective gloves against dangerous chemicals and micro-organisms
  - EN ISO 374-1: Part 1: Terminology and performance requirements for chemical risks (ISO 374-1:2016)
  - EN ISO 374-5: Part 5: Terminology and performance requirements for micro-organisms risks (ISO 374-5:2016)
- EN 379: Personal eye-protection – Automatic welding filters
- EN 381: Protective clothing for users of hand-held chain saws
  - EN 381-5: Part 5: Requirements for leg protectors
  - EN 381-7: Part 7: Requirements for chainsaw protective gloves
  - EN 381-9: Part 9: Requirements for chain saw protective gaiters
  - EN 381-11: Part 11: Requirements for upper body protectors
- EN 386: Glued laminated timber - Performance requirements and minimum production requirements
- EN 388: Protective gloves against mechanical risks
- EN 390: Glued laminated timber. Sizes. Permissible deviations
- EN 391: Glued laminated timber - Delamination tests of glue lines
- EN 392: Glued laminated timber - Shear test of glue lines
- EN 397: Industrial safety helmets
- EN 402: Respiratory protective devices – Lung governed demand self-contained open-circuit compressed air breathing apparatus with full face mask or mouthpiece assembly for escape – Requirements, testing, marking
- EN 403: Respiratory protective devices for self-rescue – Filtering devices with hood for escape from fire – Requirements, testing, marking
- EN 404: Respiratory protective devices for self-rescue – Filter self-rescuer from carbon monoxide with mouthpiece assembly
- EN 405: Respiratory protective devices – Valved filtering half masks to protect against gases or gases and particles – Requirements, testing, marking
- EN 407: Protective gloves against thermal risks (heat and/or fire)
- EN 408: Structural timber and glued laminated timber — Determination of some physical and mechanical properties
- EN 417: Non-refillable metallic cartridges for liquefied petroleum gases
- EN 420: Protective gloves – General requirements and test methods
- EN 421: Protective gloves against ionizing radiation and radioactive contamination
- EN 438: Decorative high-pressure laminates (HPL) sheets based on thermosetting resins.
- EN 440: "Welding consumables wire electrodes and deposits for gas shielded metal arc welding of non-alloy and fine grain steel - Classification" (1994)
- EN 443: Helmets for fire fighting in buildings and other structures
- EN 450: Fly ash for concrete - Definitions, requirements and quality control
- EN 469: Protective clothing for firefighters – Performance requirements for protective clothing for firefighting activities
- EN 474: Earth-moving Machinery. Safety. General Requirements
- EN 510: Specification for protective clothing for use where there is a risk of entanglement with moving parts
- EN 511: Protective gloves against cold
- EN 518: Structural timber. Grading. Requirements for visual strength grading standards (replaced by EN 14081-1)
- EN 519: Structural timber. Grading. Requirements for machine strength graded timber and grading machines (Replaced by EN 14081-1)
- EN 564: Mountaineering equipment – Accessory cords – Safety requirements and test methods
- EN 565: Mountaineering equipment – Tape – Safety requirements and test methods
- EN 566: Mountaineering equipment – Slings – Safety requirements and test methods
- EN 567: Mountaineering equipment – Rope clamps – Safety requirements and test methods
- EN 568: Mountaineering equipment – Ice anchors – Safety requirements and test methods
- EN 569: Mountaineering equipment – Pitons – Safety requirements and test methods
- EN 590: Specification for automotive diesel
- EN 631: Containers for foodstuffs
- EN 659: Protective gloves for firefighters
- EN 694: Fire-fighting hoses. Semi-rigid hoses for fixed systems
- EN 716: Children's cots and folding cots for domestic use
- EN 795: Personal fall protection equipment – Anchor devices
- EN 805: Water supply. Requirements for systems and components outside buildings
- EN 812: Industrial bump caps
- EN 813: Personal fall protection equipment – Sit harnesses
- EN 837: Pressure connections
- EN 840: Mobile waste containers.
- EN 877: Cast iron pipes and fittings, their joints and accessories for the evacuation of water from buildings. Requirements, test methods and quality assurance
- EN 892: Mountaineering equipment – Dynamic mountaineering ropes – Safety requirements and test methods
- EN 893: Mountaineering equipment – Crampons – Safety requirements and test methods
- EN 926: Paragliding equipment - Paragliders
  - EN 926-1: Part 1: Requirements and test methods for structural strength
  - EN 926-2: Part 2: Requirements and test methods for classifying flight safety characteristics
- EN 933-1: Test for geometrical properties of aggregates - Part 1: determination of particle size distribution - Sieving method
- EN 934-2: Admixtures for concrete, mortar and grout - Part 2: concrete admixtures - Definitions and requirements
- EN 943: Protective clothing against dangerous solid, liquid and gaseous chemicals, including liquid and solid aerosols
  - EN 943-1: Part 1: Performance requirements for Type 1 (gas-tight) chemical protective suits
  - EN 943-2: Part 2: Performance requirements for Type 1 (gas-tight) chemical protective suits for emergency teams (ET)
- EN 958: Mountaineering equipment – Energy absorbing systems for use in klettersteig (via ferrata) climbing – Safety requirements and test methods
- EN 966: Helmets for airborne sports
- EN 980: Symbols for use in the labeling of medical devices

== EN 1000–1989 ==
- EN 1010-1: Safety of machinery. Safety requirements for the design and construction of printing and paper converting machines. Common requirements
- EN 1010-2: Safety of machinery. Safety requirements for the design and construction of printing and paper converting machines. Printing and varnishing machines including pre-press machinery
- EN 1010-3: Safety of machinery. Safety requirements for the design and construction of printing and paper converting machines. Cutting machines
- EN 1010-4: Safety of machinery. Safety requirements for the design and construction of printing and paper converting machines. Bookbinding, paper converting and finishing machines
- EN 1010-5: Safety of machinery - Safety requirements for the design and construction of printing and paper converting machines. Machines for the production of corrugated board
- EN 1069: Water slides of 2 m height and more
- EN 1073-1: Protective clothing against solid airborne particles including radioactive contamination – Part 1: Requirements and test methods for compressed air line ventilated protective clothing, protecting the body and the respiratory tract
- EN 1073-2: Protective clothing against radioactive contamination – Part 2: Requirements and test methods for non-ventilated protective clothing against particulate radioactive contamination
- EN 1077: Helmets for alpine skiers and snowboarders
- EN 1078: Helmets for pedal cyclists and for users of skateboards and roller skates
- EN 1080: Impact protection helmets for young children
- EN 1082: Protective clothing – Gloves and arm guards protecting against cuts and stabs by hand knives
  - EN 1082-1: Part 1: Chain mail gloves and arm guards
  - EN 1082-2: Part 2: Gloves and arm guards made of material other than chain mail
- EN 1090: Execution of steel structures and aluminium structures (3 parts)
- EN 1092: Flanges and their joints. Circular flanges for pipes, valves, fittings and accessories, PN designated
- EN 1146: Respiratory protective devices – Self-contained open-circuit compressed air breathing apparatus incorporating a hood for escape – Requirements, testing, marking
- EN 1149-5: Protective clothing – Electrostatic properties – Part 5: Material performance and design requirements
- EN 1150: Protective clothing – Visibility clothing for non-professional use – Test methods and requirements
- EN 1168: Precast concrete products - Hollow core slabs
- EN 1176-1: Playground equipment. General safety requirements and test methods
- EN 1177: Impact absorbing playground surfacing. Safety requirements and test methods
- EN 1325:2014: Value Management. Vocabulary. Terms and definitions
  - EN 1325-1:1997 Value management, value analysis, functional analysis vocabulary. Value analysis and functional analysis (withdrawn, replaced by EN 1325:2014)
- EN 1337: Structural bearings
- EN 1384: Helmets for equestrian activities
- EN 1385: Helmets for canoeing and white water sports
- EN 1399: Resilient floor coverings. Determination of resistance to stubbed and burning cigarettes
- EN 1401: Plastics piping systems for non-pressure underground drainage and sewerage - Unplasticized poly(vinyl chloride) (PVC-U)
- EN 1466: Child use and care articles - Carry cots and stands - Safety requirements and test methods
- EN 1486: Protective clothing for fire-fighters – Test methods and requirements for reflective clothing for specialised fire-fighting
- EN 1496: Personal fall protection equipment – Rescue lifting devices
- EN 1497: Personal fall protection equipment – Rescue harnesses
- EN 1679: Reciprocating internal combustion engines: Compression ignition engines
- EN 1731: Personal eye protection – Mesh eye and face protectors
- EN 1809: Diving accessories. Buoyancy compensators. Functional and safety requirements, test methods.
- EN 1815: Resilient and textile floor coverings. Assessment of static electrical propensity
- EN 1827: Respiratory protective devices – Half masks without inhalation valves and with separable filters to protect against gases or gases and particles or particles only – Requirements, testing, marking
- EN 1846: Firefighting and rescue service vehicles
- EN 1888-1: Child use and care articles - Wheeled child conveyances (Part 1: Pushchairs and prams—Up to 15 kg)
- EN 1888-2: Child use and care articles - Wheeled child conveyances (Part 2: Pushchairs for children above 15 kg up to 22 kg)
- EN 1891: Personal protective equipment for the prevention of falls from a height – Low stretch kernmantel ropes
- EN 1938: Personal eye protection – Goggles for motorcycle and moped users
- EN 1972: Diving equipment - Snorkels - Requirements and test methods

== EN 1990–1999 (Eurocodes) ==
- EN 1990: (Eurocode 0) Basis of structural design
- EN 1991: (Eurocode 1) Actions on structures
- EN 1992: (Eurocode 2) Design of concrete structures
- EN 1993: (Eurocode 3) Design of steel structures
- EN 1994: (Eurocode 4) Design of composite steel and concrete structures
- EN 1995: (Eurocode 5) Design of timber structures
- EN 1996: (Eurocode 6) Design of masonry structures
- EN 1997: (Eurocode 7) Geotechnical design
- EN 1998: (Eurocode 8) Design of structures for earthquake resistance
- EN 1999: (Eurocode 9) Design of aluminium structures

== EN 10000–10999 ==
This range includes almost exclusively CEN Standards related to iron and steel.

- EN 10002: Metallic Materials - Tensile Testing
  - EN 10002-1: Method of Test at Ambient Temperature
  - EN 10002-5: Method of testing at elevated temperatures
- EN 10024: Hot rolled taper flange I sections. Tolerances on shape and dimensions
- EN 10025: Hot rolled products of structural steels
  - EN 10025-1: Part 1: General technical delivery conditions
  - EN 10025-2: Part 2: Technical delivery conditions for non-alloy structural steels
  - EN 10025-3: Part 3: Technical delivery conditions for normalized/normalized rolled weldable fine grain structural steels
  - EN 10025-4: Part 4: Technical delivery conditions for thermomechanical rolled weldable fine grain structural steels
  - EN 10025-5: Part 5: Technical delivery conditions for structural steels with improved atmospheric corrosion resistance
  - EN 10025-6:Part 6: Technical delivery conditions for flat products of high yield strength structural steels in the quenched and tempered condition
- EN 10027: Designation systems for steel.
  - EN 10088-1 Stainless steels - Part 1: List of stainless steels
  - EN 10088-2 Stainless steels - Part 2: Technical delivery conditions for sheet/plate and strip of corrosion resisting steels for general purposes
  - EN 10088-3 Stainless steels - Part 3: Stainless steels - Technical delivery conditions for semi-finished products, bars, rods, wire, sections and bright products of corrosion resisting steels for general purposes
  - EN 10088-4 Stainless steels - Part 4: Technical delivery conditions for sheet/plate and strip of corrosion resisting steels for construction purposes;
- EN 10149: Hot rolled flat products made of high yield strength steels for cold forming.
  - EN 10149-1: General technical delivery conditions
  - EN 10149-2: Technical delivery conditions for thermomechanically rolled steels
  - EN 10149-3: Technical delivery conditions for normalized or normalized rolled steels
- EN 10204: Metallic products - Types of inspection documents
- EN 10216: Seamless steel tubes for pressure purposes
  - EN 10216-1: Part 1: Non-alloy steel tubes with specified room temperature properties
  - EN 10216-2: Part 2: Non alloy and alloy steel tubes with specified elevated temperature properties
  - EN 10216-3: Part 3: Alloy fine grain steel tubes
  - EN 10216-4: Part 4: Non-alloy and alloy steel tubes with specified low temperature properties
  - EN 10216-5: Part 5: Stainless steel tubes
- EN 10217: Welded steel tubes for pressure purposes
  - EN 10217-1: Part 1: Non-alloy steel tubes with specified room temperature properties
  - EN 10217-2: Part 2: Electric welded non-alloy and alloy steel tubes with specified elevated temperature properties
  - EN 10217-3: Part 3: Alloy fine grain steel tubes
  - EN 10217-4: Part 4: Electric welded non-alloy steel tubes with specified low temperature properties
  - EN 10217-7: Part 7: Welded stainless steel tubes for pressure purposes at low and elevated temperature environment
- EN 10220: Seamless and welded steel tubes — Dimensions and masses per unit length
- EN 10240: Internal and/or external protective coating for steel tubes - specification for hot dip galvanized coatings applied in automatic plants
- EN 10270-1: Steel wire for mechanical springs - Part 1: Patented cold drawn unalloyed spring steel wire
- EN 10270-2: Steel wire for mechanical springs - Part 2: Oil hardened and tempered spring steel wire
- EN 10305: Steel tubes for precision applications — Technical delivery conditions
  - Part 4: Seamless cold drawn tubes for hydraulic and pneumatic power systems
  - Part 6: Welded cold drawn tubes for hydraulic and pneumatic power systems

EN 12080, Railway applications — Axleboxes — Rolling bearings

- EN 10357: Austenitic, austenitic-ferritic and ferritic longitudinally welded stainless steel tubes for the food and chemical industry
- EN 10365: Hot rolled steel channels, I and H sections. Dimensions and masses
- EN ISO 10819: Mechanical vibration and shock – Hand-arm vibration – Measurement and evaluation of the vibration transmissibility of gloves at the palm of the hand (ISO 10819:2013)
- EN ISO 10862: Small craft – Quick release system for trapeze harness (ISO 10862:2009)

== EN 11000–19999 ==
- EN ISO 11393: Protective clothing for users of hand-held chainsaws
  - EN ISO 11393-2: Part 2: Performance requirements and test methods for leg protectors (ISO 11393-2:2018)
  - EN ISO 11393-4: Part 4: Performance requirements and test methods for protective gloves (ISO 11393-4:2018)
  - EN ISO 11393-5: Part 5: Performance requirements and test methods for protective gaiters (ISO 11393-5:2018)
  - EN ISO 11393-6: Part 6: Performance requirements and test methods for upper body protectors (ISO 11393-6:2018)
- EN 12021: Respiratory equipment – Compressed gases for breathing apparatus
- EN 12083: Respiratory protective devices – Filters with breathing hoses, (Non-mask mounted filters) – Particle filters, gas filters, and combined filters – Requirements, testing, marking
- EN 12102: Air conditioners, liquid chilling packages, heat pumps and dehumidifiers with electrically driven compressors for space heating and cooling - Measurement of airborne noise - Determination of the sound power level
- EN 12103: Resilient floor coverings - Agglomerated cork underlays - specification
- EN 12104: Resilient floor coverings - Cork floor tiles - Specification
- EN 12105: Resilient floor coverings - Determination of moisture content of agglomerated composition cork
- EN 12199: Resilient floor coverings. Specifications for homogeneous and heterogeneous relief rubber floor coverings
- EN 12209: Building hardware - Mechanically operated locks and locking plates - Characteristics and test methods
- EN 12221: Changing units for domestic use
- EN 12246: Quality classification of timber used in pallets and packaging
- EN 12255: Wastewater treatment plants
  - EN 12255-1: Part 1: General construction principles
  - EN 12255-2: Part 2: Performance requirements of raw wastewater pumping installations
  - EN 12255-3: Part 3: Preliminary treatment
  - EN 12255-4: Part 4: Primary settlement
  - EN 12255-5: Part 5: Lagooning processes
  - EN 12255-6: Part 6: Activated sludge process
  - EN 12255-7: Part 7: Biological fixed-film reactors
  - EN 12255-8: Part 8: Sludge treatment and storage
  - EN 12255-9: Part 9: Odour control and ventilation
  - EN 12255-10: Part 10: Safety principles
  - EN 12255-11: Part 11: General data required
  - EN 12255-12: Part 12: Control and automation
  - EN 12255-13: Part 13: Chemical treatment - Treatment of wastewater by precipitation/flocculation
  - EN 12255-14: Part 14: Disinfection
  - EN 12255-15: Part 15: Measurement of the oxygen transfer in clean water in aeration tanks of activated sludge plants
  - EN 12255-16: Part 16: Physical (mechanical) filtration
- EN 12270: Mountaineering equipment – Chocks – Safety requirements and test methods
- EN 12275: Mountaineering equipment – Connectors – Safety requirements and test methods
- EN 12276: Mountaineering equipment – Frictional anchors – Safety requirements and test methods
- EN 12277: Mountaineering equipment – Harnesses – Safety requirements and test methods
- EN 12278: Montaineering equipment – Pulleys – Safety requirements and test methods
- EN 12281: Printing and business paper. Requirements for copy paper.
- EN ISO 12312: Eye and face protection – Sunglasses and related eyewear
  - EN ISO 12312-1: Part 1: Sunglasses for general use (ISO 12312-1:2013)
  - EN ISO 12312-2: Part 2: Filters for direct observation of the sun (ISO 12312-2:2015)
- EN 12345: Welding. Multilingual terms for welded joints with illustrations
- EN ISO 12401: Small craft – Deck safety harness and safety line – Safety requirements and test methods (ISO 12401:2009)
- EN ISO 12402: Personal flotation devices
  - EN ISO 12402-2: Part 2: Lifejackets, performance level 275 – Safety requirements (ISO 12402-2:2020)
  - EN ISO 12402-3: Part 3: Lifejackets, performance level 150 – Safety requirements (ISO 12402-3:2020)
  - EN ISO 12402-4: Part 4: Lifejackets, performance level 100 – Safety requirements (ISO 12402-4:2020)
  - EN ISO 12402-5: Part 5: Buoyancy aids (level 50) – Safety requirements (ISO 12402-5:2020)
  - EN ISO 12402-6: Part 6: Special application lifejackets and buoyancy aids – Safety requirements and additional test methods (ISO 12402-6:2020)
  - EN ISO 12402-8: Part 8: Accessories – Safety requirements and test methods (ISO 12402-8:2020)
- EN 12477: Protective gloves for welders
- EN 12492: Mountaineering equipment – Helmets for mountaineers – Safety requirements and test methods
- EN 12566: Small wastewater treatment systems for up to 50 PT
  - EN 12566-1: Part 1: Prefabricated septic tanks
  - EN 12566-2: Part 2: Soil infiltration systems
  - EN 12566-3: Part 3: Packaged and/or site assembled domestic wastewater treatment plants
  - EN 12566-4: Part 4: Septic tanks assembled in situ from prefabricated kits
  - EN 12566-5: Part 5: Pretreated Effluent Filtration systems
  - EN 12566-6: Part 6: Prefabricated treatment units for septic tank effluent
  - EN 12566-7: Part 7: Prefabricated tertiary treatment units
- EN 12572: Artificial climbing structures
- EN 12600: Classification of Resistance of Glazing to Impact
- EN 12663: Railway applications - Structural requirements of railway vehicle bodies
  - Part 1: Locomotives and passenger rolling stock (and alternative method for freight wagons)
  - Part 2: Freight wagons
- EN 12797: Brazing – Destructive tests of brazed joints
- EN 12799: Brazing – Non-destructive examination brazed joints
- EN 12810: Facade scaffolds made of prefabricated parts
- EN 12811: Temporary works equipment
- EN 12841: Personal fall protection equipment – Rope access systems – Rope adjustment devices
- EN 12845 Fixed firefighting systems. Automatic sprinkler systems. Design, installation and maintenance
- EN 12890: Patterns, pattern equipment and coreboxes for the production of sand molds and sand cores
- EN 12896: Public Transport Reference Data Model
- EN 12941: Respiratory protective devices – Powered filtering devices incorporating a loose fitting respiratory interface – Requirements, testing, marking
- EN 12942: Respiratory protective devices – Powered filtering devices incorporating full face masks, half masks or quarter masks – Requirements, testing, marking
- EN 12952: Water-Tube Boilers and Auxiliary Installations
- EN 12973: Value Management
- EN 12975-1: Thermal solar systems and components - Solar collectors
- EN 13000: Cranes - Mobile Cranes
- EN 13034: Protective clothing against liquid chemicals – Performance requirements for chemical protective clothing offering limited protective performance against liquid chemicals (Type 6 and Type PB [6] equipment)
- EN 13061: Protective clothing – Shin guards for association football players – Requirements and test methods
- EN 13089: Mountaineering equipment – Ice-tools – Safety requirements and test methods
- EN 13103: Railway applications — Wheelsets and bogies — Non-powered axles — Design method
- EN 13104: Railway applications — Wheelsets and bogies — Powered axles — Design method
- EN 13133: "Brazing - Brazer approval" (2000)
- EN 13138-1: Buoyant aids for swimming instruction – Part 1: Safety requirements and test methods for buoyant aids to be worn
- EN 13145: Railway applications - Track - Wood sleepers and bearers
- EN 13146: Railway applications - Track - Test methods for fastening systems
  - EN 13146-1: Part 1: Determination of longitudinal rail restraint
  - EN 13146-2: Part 2: Determination of torsional resistance
  - EN 13146-3: Part 3: Determination of attenuation of impact loads
  - EN 13146-4: Part 4: Effect of repeated loading
  - EN 13146-5: Part 5: Determination of electrical resistance
  - EN 13146-6: Part 6: Effect of severe environmental conditions
  - EN 13146-7: Part 7: Determination of clamping force
  - EN 13146-8: Part 8: In service testing
  - EN 13146-9: Part 9: Determination of stiffness
- EN 13158: Protective clothing – Protective jackets, body and shoulder protectors for equestrian use, for horse riders and those working with horses, and for horse drivers – Requirements and test methods
- EN 13162: Thermal insulation products for buildings - Factory made mineral wool (MW) products
- EN 13165: Thermal insulation products for buildings - Factory made rigid polyurethane foam (PU) products
- EN 13178: Personal eye-protection – Eye protectors for snowmobile users
- EN 13204: Double acting hydraulic rescue tools for fire and rescue service use. Safety and performance requirements
- EN 13231: Railway applications - Track - Acceptance of works
  - EN 13231-1: Part 1: Works on ballasted track - Plain line, switches and crossings
  - EN 13231-2: Part 2: Acceptance of reprofiling rails in plain line, switches, crossings, and expansion devices
  - EN 13231-3: withdrawn, replaced by EN 13231-2
  - EN 13231-4: withdrawn, replaced by EN 13231-2
  - EN 13231-5: Part 5: Procedures for rail reprofiling in plain line, switches, crossings, and expansion devices
- EN 13260: Railway applications — Wheelsets and bogies — Wheelsets — Product requirements
- EN 13261: Railway applications — Wheelsets and bogies — Axles — Product requirements
- EN 13262: Railway applications — Wheelsets and bogies — Wheels — Product requirements
- EN 13277: Protective equipment for martial arts
  - EN 13277-1: Part 1: General requirements and test methods
  - EN 13277-2: Part 2: Additional requirements and test methods for instep protectors, shin protectors and forearm protectors
  - EN 13277-3: Part 3: Additional requirements and test methods for trunk protectors
  - EN 13277-4: Part 4: Additional requirements and test methods for head protectors
  - EN 13277-5: Part 5: Additional requirements and test methods for genital protectors and abdominal protectors
  - EN 13277-6: Part 6: Additional requirements and test methods for breast protectors for females
  - EN 13277-7: Part 7: Additional requirements and test methods for hand and foot protectors
  - EN 13277-8: Part 8: Additional requirements and test methods for karate face protectors
- EN 13300: quality and classification of (interior) wall paint
- EN 13309: Construction machinery - Electromagnetic compatibility of machines with internal power supply
- EN 13319: Diving accessories. Depth gauges and combined depth and time measuring devices. Functional and safety requirements, test methods.
- EN 13356: Visibility accessories for non-professional use – Test methods and requirements
- EN 13402: Size designation of clothes
- EN 13432: Compostable and biodegradable packaging
- EN 13445: Unfired pressure vessels
- EN 13480: Metallic industrial piping
- EN 13484: Helmets for users of luges
- EN 13501: Fire classification of construction products and building elements
- EN 13537: Temperature ratings for sleeping bags
- EN 13546: Protective clothing – Hand, arm, chest, abdomen, leg, foot and genital protectors for field hockey goal keepers, and shin protectors for field players – Requirements and test methods
- EN 13567: Protective clothing – Hand, arm, chest, abdomen, leg, genital and face protectors for fencers – Requirements and test methods
- EN 13594: Protective gloves for motorcycle riders – Requirements and test methods
- EN 13595: Protective clothing for professional motorcycle riders – Jackets, trousers and one piece or divided suits
  - EN 13595-1: Part 1: General requirements
  - EN 13595-2: Part 2: Test method for determination of impact abrasion resistance
  - EN 13595-3: Part 3: Test method for determination of burst strength
  - EN 13595-4: Part 4: Test methods for the determination of impact cut resistance
- EN 13612: Performance evaluation of in-vitro diagnostic devices
- EN 13634: Protective footwear for motorcycle riders – Requirements and test methods
- EN 13640: Stability testing of in vitro diagnostic reagents
- EN ISO 13688: Protective clothing – General requirements (ISO 13688:2013)
  - EN 13749 Railway applications — Wheelsets and bogies — Method of specifying the structural requirements of bogie frames
- EN 13757: Communication system for meters and remote reading of meters (Meter-Bus)
- EN 13781: Protective helmets for drivers and passengers of snowmobiles and bobsleighs
- EN 13794: Respiratory protective devices – Self-contained closed-circuit breathing apparatus for escape – Requirements, testing, marking
- EN 13803: Railway applications - Track - Track alignment design parameters - Track gauges 1435 mm and wider
- EN 13832: Footwear protecting against chemicals
  - EN 13832-2: Part 2: Requirements for limited contact with chemicals
  - EN 13832-3: Part 3: Requirements for prolonged contact with chemicals
- EN 13940:2016: System of concepts to support continuity of care
- EN 13949: Respiratory equipment – Open-circuit self-contained diving apparatus for use with compressed Nitrox and oxygen – Requirements, testing, marking
- EN 13979: Railway applications — Wheelsets and bogies — Monobloc wheels — Technical approval procedure
  - Part 1: Forged and rolled wheels
- EN ISO 13982: Protective clothing for use against solid particulates
  - EN ISO 13982-1: Part 1: Performance requirements for chemical protective clothing providing protection to the full body against airborne solid particulates (type 5 clothing) (ISO 13982-1:2004)
- EN ISO 13998: Protective clothing – Aprons, trousers and vests protecting against cuts and stabs by hand knives (ISO 13998:2003)
- EN 14021: Stone shields for off-road motorcycling suited to protect riders against stones and debris – Requirements and test methods
- EN 14033: Railway applications — Track — Railbound construction and maintenance machines
  - Part 1: Technical requirements for running
  - Part 2: Technical requirements for travelling and working
  - Part 3: General safety requirements
- EN 14052: High performance industrial helmets
- EN 14058: Protective clothing – Garments for protection against cool environments
- EN 14067: Railway applications — Aerodynamics
  - Part 1: Symbols and units
  - Part 3: Aerodynamics in tunnels
  - Part 4: Requirements and test procedures for aerodynamics on open track
  - Part 5: Requirements and test procedures for aerodynamics in tunnels
  - Part 6: Requirements and test procedures for cross wind assessment
- EN 14081: Timber structures - Strength graded structural timber with rectangular cross section
  - Part 1: General requirements
  - Part 2: Machine grading - additional requirements for initial type testing.
  - Part 3: Machine grading - additional requirements for factory production control.
  - Part 4: Machine grading - grading machine settings for machine controlled systems.
- EN 14120: Protective clothing – Wrist, palm, knee and elbow protectors for users of roller sports equipment – Requirements and test methods
- EN 14126: Protective clothing – Performance requirements and tests methods for protective clothing against infective agents
- EN 14143: Respiratory equipment – Self-contained re-breathing diving apparatus
- EN 14214: The pure biodiesel standard
- EN 14225: Diving suits
  - EN 14225-1: Part 1: Wet suits – Requirements and test methods
  - EN 14225-2: Part 2: Dry suits – Requirements and test methods
  - EN 14225-3: Part 3: Actively heated or cooled suit systems and components – Requirements and test methods
- EN 14328: Protective clothing – Gloves and armguards protecting against cuts by powered knives – Requirements and test methods
- EN 14363: Railway applications — Testing and Simulation for the acceptance of running characteristics of railway vehicles — Running Behaviour and stationary tests
- EN 14387: Respiratory protective devices — Gas filter(s) and combined filter(s) — Requirements, testing, marking
- EN 14435: Respiratory protective devices – Self-contained open-circuit compressed air breathing apparatus with half mask designed to be used with positive pressure only – Requirements, testing, marking
- EN 14450: Secure storage units — Requirements, classification and methods of test for resistance to burglary - Secure safe cabinets
- EN 14458: Personal eye-equipment – High performance visors intended only for use with protective helmets
- EN ISO 14460: Protective clothing for automobile racing drivers – Protection against heat and flame – Performance requirements and test methods (ISO 14460:1999)
- EN 14511: Air conditioners, liquid chilling packages and heat pumps with electrically driven compressors for space heating and cooling
- EN 14529: Respiratory protective devices – Self-contained open-circuit compressed air breathing apparatus with half mask designed to include a positive pressure lung governed demand valve for escape purposes only
- EN 14531: Railway applications — Methods for calculation of stopping and slowing distances and immobilization braking
  - Part 1: General algorithms utilizing mean value calculation for train sets or single vehicles
  - Part 2: Step by step calculations for train sets or single vehicles
- EN 14535: Railway applications — Brake discs for railway rolling stock
  - Part 1: Brake discs pressed or shrunk onto the axle or drive shaft, dimensions and quality requirements
  - Part 2: Brake discs mounted onto the wheel, dimensions and quality requirements
- EN 14593-1: Respiratory protective devices – Compressed air line breathing apparatus with demand valve – Part 1: Apparatus with a full face mask – Requirements, testing, marking
- EN 14594: Respiratory protective devices – Continuous flow compressed air line breathing devices – Requirements, testing and marking
- EN 14601: Railway applications — Straight and angled end cocks for brake pipe and main reservoir pipe
- EN 14605: Protective clothing against liquid chemicals – performance requirements for clothing with liquid-tight (Type 3) or spray-tight (Type 4) connections, including items providing protection to parts of the body only (Types PB [3] and PB [4])
- EN 14683: Medical face masks — Requirements and test method
- EN ISO 14877: Protective clothing for abrasive blasting operations using granular abrasives (ISO 14877:2002)
- EN 14904: Surfaces for sports areas. Indoor surfaces for multi-sports use. Specification
- EN 14988: Children's High chairs
  - Part 1: Safety requirements
  - Part 2: Test methods
- EN ISO 15027: Immersion suits
  - EN ISO 15027-1: Part 1: Constant wear suits, requirements including safety (ISO 15027-1:2012)
  - EN ISO 15027-2: Part 2: Abandonment suits, requirements including safety (ISO 15027-2:2012)
- EN 15090: Footwear for firefighters
- EN 15151-1: Mountaineering equipment – Braking devices – Part 1: Braking devices with manually assisted locking, safety requirements and test methods
- EN 15152: Railway applications — Front windscreens for train cabs
- EN 15153: Railway applications — External visible and audible warning devices
  - Part 1: Head, marker and tail lamps
  - Part 2: Warning horns
- EN 15179: Railway applications — Braking — Requirements for the brake system of coaches
- EN 15220: Railway applications — Brake indicators
- EN 15227: Railway applications — Crashworthiness requirements for railway vehicle bodies
- EN 15251: Indoor environmental input parameters for design and assessment of energy performance of buildings- addressing indoor air quality, thermal environment, lighting and acoustics
- EN 15273: Railway applications - Gauges
  - Part 1: General - Common rules for infrastructure and rolling stock
  - Part 2: Rolling stock gauge
  - Part 3: Structure gauges
- EN 15313: Railway applications — In-service wheelset operation requirements — In-service and off-vehicle wheelset maintenance
- EN 15329: Railway applications — Braking — Brake block holder and brake shoe key for railway vehicles
- EN 15333: Respiratory equipment – Open-circuit umbilical supplied compressed gas diving apparatus
  - EN 15333-1: Part 1: Demand apparatus
  - EN 15333-2: Part 2: Free flow apparatus
- EN 15355: Railway applications — Braking — Distributor valves and distributor-isolating devices
- EN 15427 Railway applications - Wheel/Rail friction management
  - Part 1-1: Equipment and Application – Flange lubrication
  - Part 1-2: Equipment and Application – Top of Rail materials
  - Part 1-3: Equipment and Application – Adhesion materials
  - Part 2-1: Properties and Characteristics – Flange lubricants
  - Part 2-2: Properties and Characteristics – Top of Rail materials
  - Part 2-3: Properties and Characteristics – Adhesion materials
- EN 15437: Railway applications — Axlebox condition monitoring — Interface and design requirements
  - Part 1: Track side equipment and rolling stock axlebox
- EN 15528: Railway applications — Line categories for managing the interface between load limits of vehicles and infrastructure
- EN 15531: Service Interface for Real Time Information
- EN 15551: Railway applications — Railway rolling stock — Buffers
- EN 15566: Railway applications — Railway rolling stock — Draw gear and screw coupling
- EN 15595: Railway applications - Braking - Wheel slide protection
- EN 15610: Railway applications - Acoustics - Rail and wheel roughness measurement related to noise generation
- EN 15611: Railway applications — Braking — Relay valves
- EN 15612: Railway applications — Braking — Brake pipe accelerator valve
- EN 15613: Knee and elbow protectors for indoor sports – Safety requirements and test methods
- EN 15624: Railway applications — Braking — Empty-loaded changeover devices
- EN 15625: Railway applications — Braking — Automatic variable load sensing devices
- EN 15663: Railway applications — Definition of vehicle reference masses
- EN 15714: Industrial Valves - Actuators
- EN 15744: Film identification — Minimum set of metadata for cinematographic works
- EN 15804: Sustainability of construction works - Environmental product declarations - Core rules for the product category of construction products
- EN 15806: Railway applications — Braking — Static brake testing
- EN 15807: Railway applications — Pneumatic half couplings
- EN 15827: Railway applications — Requirements for bogies and running gears
- EN 15838: Customer Contact Centres - Requirements for service provision
- EN 15839: Railway applications — Testing for the acceptance of running characteristics of railway vehicles — Freight wagons — Testing of running safety under longitudinal compressive forces
- EN 15877: Railway applications — Marking on railway vehicles
  - Part 1: Freight wagons
  - Part 2: External markings on coaches, motive power units, locomotives and on track machines
- EN 15883: Washer-disinfectors
- EN 15907: Film identification — Enhancing interoperability of metadata - Element sets and structures
- EN 16001: Energy management systems; withdrawn, replaced by ISO 50001
- EN 16027: Protective clothing – Gloves with protective effect for association football goal keepers
- EN 16034: Pedestrian doorsets, industrial, commercial, garage doors and openable windows. Product standard, performance characteristics. Fire resisting and/or smoke control characteristics
- EN 16114: Management consultancy services
- EN 16207: Railway applications — Braking — Functional and performance criteria of Magnetic Track Brake systems for use in railway rolling stock
- EN 16228: Drilling and foundation equipment – Safety
  - EN 16228-1: Common requirements
  - EN 16228-2: Mobile drill rigs for civil and geotechnical engineering, quarrying and mining
  - EN 16228-3: Horizontal directional drilling equipment (HDD)
  - EN 16228-4: Foundation equipment
  - EN 16228-5: Diaphragm walling equipment
  - EN 16228-6: Jetting, grouting and injection equipment
  - EN 16228-7: Interchangeable auxiliary equipment
- EN 16247: Energy audits
- EN ISO 16321: Eye and face protection for occupational use
  - EN ISO 16321-1: Part 1: General requirements (ISO 16321-1:2021)
  - EN ISO 16321-2: Part 2: Additional requirements for protectors used during welding and related techniques (ISO 16321-2:2021)
  - EN ISO 16321-3: Part 3: Additional requirements for mesh protectors (ISO 16321-3:2021)
- EN 16350: Protective gloves – Electrostatic properties
- EN 16404: Railway applications — Re-railing and recovery requirements for railway vehicles
- EN 16473: Firefighters helmets – Helmets for technical rescue
- EN 16716: Mountaineering equipment – Avalanche airbag systems – Safety requirements and test methods
- EN 16725: Railway applications — Track — Restoration and repair of manganese crossings
- EN 16729: Railway applications – Infrastructure – Non-destructive testing on rails in track
  - EN 16729-1: Part 1: Requirements for ultrasonic inspection and evaluation principles
  - EN 16729-2: Part 2: Eddy current testing of rails in track
  - EN 16729-3: Part 3: Requirements for identifying internal and surface rail defects
  - EN 16729-4: Part 4: Qualification of personnel for non-destructive testing on rails
  - EN 16729-5: Part 5: Non-destructive testing on welds in track
- EN 16804: Diving equipment — Diving open heel fins — Requirements and test methods
- EN 16805: Diving equipment — Diving mask — Requirements and test methods
- EN 16931-1: Electronic Invoicing - Semantic data model of the core elements of an electronic invoice
- EN 17092: Protective garments for motorcycle riders
  - EN 17092-2: Part 2: Class AAA garments – Requirements
  - EN 17092-3: Part 3: Class AA garments – Requirements
  - EN 17092-4: Part 4: Class A garments – Requirements
  - EN 17092-5: Part 5: Class B garments – Requirements
  - EN 17092-6: Part 6: Class C garments – Requirements
- EN 17109: Mountaineering equipment – Individual safety systems for rope courses – Safety requirements and test methods
- EN 17161: Design for All - Accessibility following a Design for All approach in products, goods and services - Extending the range of users
- EN ISO 17249: Safety footwear with resistance to chain saw cutting (ISO 17249:2013)
- EN 17282: Railway applications — Infrastructure —Under ballast mats
- EN 17343: Railway applications — General terms and definitions
- EN 17353: Protective clothing – Enhanced visibility equipment for medium risk situations – Test methods and requirements
- EN 17397: Railway applications — Rail defects
  - EN 17397-1: Part 1: Rail defect management
- EN 17495: Railway Applications — Acoustics — Determination of the dynamic stiffness of elastic track components related to noise and vibration: Rail pads and rail fastening assemblies
- EN 17520: Mountaineering equipment – Personal belay lanyards – Safety requirements and test methods
- EN 17682: Railway applications — Infrastructure — Resilient element for floating slab system
- EN 17927: Security Evaluation Standard for IoT Platforms (SESIP)
- EN ISO 18527: Eye and face protection for sports use
  - EN ISO 18527-1: Part 1: Requirements for downhill skiing and snowboarding goggles (ISO 18527-1:2021)
  - EN ISO 18527-2: Part 2: Requirements for eye protectors for squash and eye protectors for racquetball and squash 57 (ISO 18527-2:2021)

== EN 20000–49999 ==
- EN ISO 20320: Protective clothing for use in Snowboarding – Wrist Protectors – Requirements and test methods (ISO 20320:2020)
- EN ISO 20345: Personal protective equipment – Safety footwear (ISO 20345:2021)
- EN ISO 20346: Personal protective equipment – Protective footwear (ISO 20346:2021)
- EN ISO 20347: Personal protective equipment – Occupational footwear (ISO 20347:2021)
- EN ISO 20349: Personal protective equipment – Footwear protecting against risks in foundries and welding
  - EN ISO 20349-1: Part 1: Requirements and test methods for protection against risks in foundries (ISO 20349-1:2017)
  - EN ISO 20349-2: Part 2: Requirements and test methods for protection against risks in welding and allied processes (ISO 20349-2:2017)
- EN ISO 20471: High visibility clothing – Test methods and requirements (ISO 20471:2013, Corrected version 2013-06-01)
- EN ISO 27065: Protective clothing – Performance requirements for protective clothing worn by operators applying pesticides and for re-entry workers (ISO 27065:2017)
- EN 28601: Data elements and interchange formats; information interchange; representation of dates and times
- EN 45011: General requirements for bodies operating product certification systems, replaced in 2012 by ISO/IEC 17065 Conformity assessment: Requirements for bodies certifying products, processes and services.
- EN 45502-1: Active implantable medical devices - Part 1: General requirements for safety, marking and information to be provided by the manufacturer
- EN 45545: Railway applications. Fire protection on railway vehicles.
  - EN 45545-1: Railway applications. Fire protection on railway vehicles. General
  - EN 45545-2: Railway applications. Fire protection on railway vehicles. Requirements for fire behaviour of materials and components
  - EN 45545-3: Railway applications. Fire protection on railway vehicles. Fire resistance requirements for fire barriers
  - EN 45545-4: Railway applications. Fire protection on railway vehicles. Fire safety requirements for rolling stock design
  - EN 45545-5: Railway applications. Fire protection on railway vehicles. Fire safety requirements for electrical equipment including that of trolley buses, track guided buses and magnetic levitation vehicles
  - EN 45545-6: Railway applications. Fire protection on railway vehicles. Fire control and management systems
  - EN 45545-7: Railway applications. Fire protection on railway vehicles. Fire safety requirements for flammable liquid and flammable gas installations
- EN 45554: General methods for the assessment of the ability to repair, reuse and upgrade energy-related products

== EN 50000–59999 (CENELEC specific, non-IEC electrical standards) ==
- EN 50022: 35 mm snap-on top-hat mounting rails for low-voltage switchgear (DIN rail)
- EN 50075: Europlug
- EN 50090: Home and Building Electronic Systems (KNX/EIB)
- EN 50102: Degrees of protection provided by enclosures for electrical equipment against external mechanical impacts
- EN 50119: Railway applications - Fixed installations: Electric traction overhead contact lines for railways
- EN 50121: Railway applications - Electromagnetic compatibility
  - EN 50121-1: Railway applications - Electromagnetic compatibility Part 1: General
  - EN 50121-2: Railway applications - Electromagnetic compatibility - Part 2 : emission of the whole railway system to the outside world
  - EN 50121-3-1: Railway applications - Electromagnetic compatibility - Part 3-1 : rolling stock - Train and complete vehicle
  - EN 50121-3-2: Railway applications - Electromagnetic compatibility - Part 3-2 : rolling stock - Apparatus
  - EN 50121-4: Railway applications - Electromagnetic compatibility - Part 4 : emission and immunity of the signaling and telecommunications apparatus
  - EN 50121-5: Railway applications - Electromagnetic compatibility - Part 5: Emission and immunity of fixed power supply installations and apparatus
- EN 50122: Railway applications - Fixed installations
  - EN 50122-1: Railway applications - Fixed installations - Electrical safety, earthing and the return circuit - Part 1: Protective provisions against electric shock
  - EN 50122-2: Railway applications - Fixed installations - Part 2: Protective provisions against the effects of Stray currents caused by d.c. traction systems
  - EN 50122-3: Railway applications - Fixed installations - Electrical safety, earthing and the return circuit - Part 3: Mutual Interaction of a.c. and d.c. traction systems
- EN 50123: Railway applications - Fixed installations - D.C. switchgear
- EN 50124: Railway applications - Insulation coordination
- EN 50125-1: Railway applications - Environmental conditions for equipment - Part 1: Rolling stock and on-board equipment
- EN 50125-2: Railway applications - Environmental conditions for equipment - Part 2: Fixed electrical installations
- EN 50125-3: Railway applications - Environmental conditions for equipment - Part 3: Equipment for signaling and telecommunications
- EN 50126: Railway applications - The specification and demonstration of reliability, availability, maintainability and safety (RAMS)
- EN 50128: Railway applications - Communication, signalling and processing systems - Software for railway control and protection systems
- EN 50129: Railway applications - Communication, signalling and processing systems – Safety related electronic systems for signalling
- EN 50130: Alarm systems - Electromagnetic compatibility and Environmental test methods
- EN 50131: Alarm systems - Intrusion and hold-up systems
- EN 50136: Alarm systems - Alarm transmission systems
- EN 50153: Railway applications - Rolling stock - Protective provisions relating to electrical hazards
- EN 50155: Railway applications - Electronic equipment used on rolling stock
- EN 50157: Domestic and Similar Electronic Equipment Interconnection Requirements (Part1 = AV.link)
- EN 50159: Railway applications - Communication, signaling and processing systems - Safety-related communication in transmission systems
- EN 50163: Railway applications - Supply voltages of traction systems
- EN 50178: Electronic equipment for use in power installations
- EN 50207: Railway applications - Electronic power converters for rolling stock
- EN 50262: Metric cable glands
- EN 50267: Corrosive Gases
- EN 50272-1: Standards for Safety requirements for secondary batteries and battery installations - Part 1 General safety information
- EN 50272-2: Standards for Safety requirements for secondary batteries and battery installations - Part 2 Stationary batteries
- EN 50522: Earthing of power installations exceeding 1 kV a.c.
- EN 50308: Wind Turbines - Protective Measures - Requirements for design, operation and maintenance
- EN 50321-1: Live working – Footwear for electrical protection – Insulating footwear and overboots
- EN 50325: Industrial communications subsystem based on ISO 11898 (CAN) for controller-device interfaces
- EN 50365: Live Working – Electrically insulating helmets for use on low and medium voltage installations
- EN 50412: Power line communication apparatus and systems used in low-voltage installations in the frequency range 1.6 MHz to 30 MHz
- EN 50436: Alcohol interlocks
- EN 50465: Gas appliances - Combined heat and power appliance of nominal heat input inferior or equal to 70 kW
- EN 50470-3: Electricity metering equipment - Part 3: Particular requirements - Static meters for AC active energy (class indexes A, B and C)
- EN 50470-4: Electricity metering equipment - Part 4: Particular requirements - Static meters for DC active energy (class indexes A, B and C)
- EN 50525: Low voltage energy cables; a merger of HD 21 and HD 22.
- EN 50571: Household and similar electrical appliances - Safety - Particular requirements for commercial electric washing machines
- EN 50562: Railway applications - Fixed installations - Process, protective measures and demonstration of safety for electric traction systems
- EN 50581: documentation for the assessment of electrical and electronic products with respect to the RoHS
- EN 50600: Information technology - Data centre facilities and infrastructures
- EN 50617-1: Railway applications - Technical parameters of train detection systems for the interoperability of the trans-European railway system - Part 1: Track circuits
- EN 50617-2: Railway Applications - Technical parameters of train detection systems for the interoperability of the trans-European railway system - Part 2: Axle counters
- EN 50632: Electric motor-operated tools - Dust measurement Procedure
- EN 50657: Railways Applications - Rolling stock applications - Software on Board Rolling Stock
- EN 50716: Cross-functional Software Standard for Railways
- EN 55011: Industrial, scientific and medical equipment - Radio-frequency disturbance characteristics - Limits and methods of measurement
- EN 55014: Electromagnetic compatibility — Requirements for household appliances, electric tools and similar apparatus
- EN 55022: Information technology equipment. Radio disturbance characteristics.
- EN 55024: Information technology equipment. Immunity characteristics.
- EN 55032: Electromagnetic Compatibility of Multimedia Equipment. Emission requirements.
- EN 55035: Electromagnetic Compatibility of Multimedia Equipment. Immunity requirements.

== EN 60000-69999 (CENELEC editions of IEC standards) ==
- EN 60065: Audio, Video and similar electronics apparatus - Safety requirements.
- EN 60077: Railway applications - Electric equipment for rolling stock
- EN 60950-1: Information technology equipment - Safety - Part1: General requirements
- EN 60950-21: Information technology equipment - Safety - Part21: Remote power feeding
- EN 60950-22: Information technology equipment - Safety - Part22: Equipment installed outdoors
- EN 60950-23: Information technology equipment - Safety - Part23: Large data storage equipment
- EN 61000-1-2: Electromagnetic compatibility (EMC). General. Methodology for the achievement of functional safety of electrical and electronic systems including equipment with regard to electromagnetic phenomena
- EN 61000-1-3: Electromagnetic compatibility (EMC). General. The effects of high-altitude EMP (HEMP) on civil equipment and systems
- EN 61000-1-4: Electromagnetic compatibility (EMC). General. Historical rationale for the limitation of power-frequency conducted harmonic current emissions from equipment, in the frequency range up to 2 kHz
- EN 61000-1-5: Electromagnetic compatibility (EMC). General. High power electromagnetic (HPEM) effects on civil systems
- EN 61000-1-6: Electromagnetic compatibility (EMC). General. Guide to the assessment of measurement uncertainty
- EN 61000-2-2: Electromagnetic compatibility (EMC). Environment. Compatibility levels for low-frequency conducted disturbances and signaling in public low-voltage power supply systems
- EN 61000-2-4: Electromagnetic compatibility (EMC). Environment. Compatibility levels in industrial plants for low-frequency conducted disturbances
- EN 61000-2-9: Electromagnetic compatibility (EMC). Environment. Description of HEMP environment. Radiated disturbance. Basic EMC publication
- EN 61000-2-10: Electromagnetic compatibility (EMC). Environment. Description of HEMP environment. Conducted disturbance
- EN 61000-2-12: Electromagnetic compatibility (EMC). Environment. Compatibility levels for low-frequency conducted disturbances and signaling in public medium-voltage power supply systems
- EN 61000-3-2: Electromagnetic compatibility (EMC). Limits. Limits for harmonic current emissions (equipment input current up to and including 16 A per phase)
- EN 61000-3-3: Electromagnetic compatibility (EMC). Limits. Limitation of voltage changes, voltage fluctuations and flicker in public low-voltage supply systems, for equipment with rated current ≤ 16 A per phase and not subject to conditional connection
- EN 61000-3-11: Electromagnetic compatibility (EMC). Limits. Limitation of voltage changes, voltage fluctuations and flicker in public low-voltage supply systems. Equipment with rated voltage current ≤ 75 A and subject to conditional connection
- EN 61000-3-12: Electromagnetic compatibility (EMC). Limits.
- EN 61000-4-1: Electromagnetic compatibility (EMC). Testing and measurement techniques. Overview of IEC 61000-4 series
- EN 61000-4-2: Electromagnetic compatibility (EMC). Testing and measurement techniques. Electrostatic discharge immunity test. Basic EMC publication
- EN 61000-4-3: Electromagnetic compatibility (EMC). Testing and measurement techniques. Radiated, radio-frequency, electromagnetic field immunity test
- EN 61000-4-4: Electromagnetic compatibility (EMC). Testing and measurement techniques. Electrical fast transient/burst immunity test
- EN 61000-4-5: Electromagnetic compatibility (EMC). Testing and measurement techniques. Surge immunity test
- EN 61000-4-6: Electromagnetic compatibility (EMC). Testing and measurement techniques. Immunity to conducted disturbances, induced by radio-frequency fields
- EN 61000-4-7: Electromagnetic compatibility (EMC). Testing and measurement techniques. General guide on harmonics and interharmonics measurements and instrumentation, for power supply systems and equipment connected thereto
- EN 61000-4-8: Electromagnetic compatibility (EMC). Testing and measurement techniques. Power frequency magnetic field immunity test. Basic EMC publication
- EN 61000-4-11: Electromagnetic compatibility (EMC). Testing and measurement techniques. Voltage dips, short interruptions and voltage variations immunity tests
- EN 61000-4-12: Electromagnetic compatibility (EMC). Testing and measurement techniques. Oscillatory waves immunity test. Basic EMC publication
- EN 61000-4-13: Electromagnetic compatibility (EMC). Testing and measurement techniques. Harmonics and interharmonics including mains signaling at a.c. power port, low frequency immunity tests
- EN 61000-4-14: Electromagnetic compatibility (EMC). Testing and measurement techniques. Voltage fluctuation immunity test for equipment with input current not exceeding 16 A per phase
- EN 61000-4-15: Electromagnetic compatibility (EMC). Testing and measurement techniques. Flickermeter. Functional and design specifications. Basic EMC publication
- EN 61000-4-16: Electromagnetic compatibility (EMC). Testing and measurement techniques. Test for immunity to conducted, common mode disturbances in the frequency range 0 Hz to 150 kHz
- EN 61000-4-17: Electromagnetic compatibility (EMC). Testing and measurement techniques. Ripple on d.c. input power port immunity test
- EN 61000-4-18: Electromagnetic compatibility (EMC). Testing and measurement techniques. Damped oscillatory wave immunity test
- EN 61000-4-19: Electromagnetic compatibility (EMC). Testing and measurement techniques. Test for immunity to conducted, differential mode disturbances and signaling in the frequency range 2 kHz to 150 kHz at a.c. power ports
- EN 61000-4-20: Electromagnetic compatibility (EMC). Testing and measurement techniques. Emission and immunity testing in transverse electromagnetic (TEM) waveguides
- EN 61000-4-21: Electromagnetic compatibility (EMC). Testing and measurement techniques. Reverberation chamber test methods
- EN 61000-4-22: Electromagnetic compatibility (EMC). Testing and measurement techniques. Radiated emission and immunity measurements in fully anechoic rooms (FARs)
- EN 61000-4-23: Electromagnetic compatibility (EMC). Testing and measurement techniques. Test methods for protective devices for HEMP and other radiated disturbances
- EN 61000-4-24: Electromagnetic compatibility (EMC). Testing and measurement techniques. Test methods for protective devices for HEMP conducted disturbance. Basic EMC publication
- EN 61000-4-25: Electromagnetic compatibility (EMC). Testing and measurement techniques. HEMP immunity test methods for equipment and systems
- EN 61000-4-27: Electromagnetic compatibility (EMC). Testing and measurement techniques. Unbalance, immunity test for equipment with input current not exceeding 16 A per phase
- EN 61000-4-28: Electromagnetic compatibility (EMC). Testing and measurement techniques. Variation of power frequency, immunity test for equipment with input current not exceeding 16 A per phase
- EN 61000-4-29: Electromagnetic compatibility (EMC). Testing and measurement techniques. Voltage dips, short interruptions and voltage variations on d.c.input power ports. Immunity tests. Basic EMC Publication.
- EN 61000-4-30: Electromagnetic compatibility (EMC). Testing and measurement techniques. Testing and measurement techniques. Power quality measurement methods
- EN 61000-4-34: Electromagnetic compatibility (EMC). Testing and measurement techniques. Voltage dips, short interruptions and voltage variations immunity tests for equipment with mains current more than 16 A per phase
- IEC 61000-5-1 Electromagnetic compatibility (EMC). Installation and mitigation guidelines. General considerations. Basic EMC publication
- EN 61000-5-5 Electromagnetic compatibility (EMC). Installation and mitigation guidelines. Specification of protective devices for HEMP conducted disturbance. Basic EMC publication
- EN 61000-5-7 Electromagnetic compatibility (EMC). Installation and mitigation guidelines. Degrees of protection by enclosures against electromagnetic disturbances (EM code). Degrees of protection against electromagnetic disturbances provided by enclosures (EM code)
- EN 61000-6-1 Electromagnetic compatibility (EMC). Generic standards. Immunity for residential, commercial and light-industrial environments
- EN 61000-6-2 Electromagnetic compatibility (EMC). Generic standards. Immunity for industrial environments
- EN 61000-6-3 Electromagnetic compatibility (EMC). Generic standards. Emission standard for residential, commercial and light-industrial environments
- EN 61000-6-4 Electromagnetic compatibility (EMC). Generic standards. Emission standard for industrial environments
- EN 61482-2: Live working – Protective clothing against the thermal hazards of an electric arc – Part 2: Requirements
- EN 62061 /IEC 62061 Safety of machinery: Functional safety of electrical, electronic and programmable electronic control systems
- EN 62353:2014 Medical electrical equipment. Recurrent test and test after repair of medical electrical equipment

Moreover, there are a lot of ISO and IEC standards that were accepted as "European Standard" (headlined as EN ISO xxxxx) and are valid in the European Economic Region.

== See also ==
- Institute for Reference Materials and Measurements (IRMM)
- List of ASTM International standards (D5001-6000)
- List of ASTM International standards (D6001-7000)
- List of DIN standards
- List of ISO standards
