= EN 10025 =

Set of European standards for steel

- EN standard
- Reference: EN 10025
- Status: Published
- Title: Hot rolled products of structural steels
- Committee: ECISS/TC 103
- Work Item: various
- Directives: 305/2011, 89/106/EEC
- Mandate: M/120
- Citation in OJEU: 305/2011 (Expected), 89/106/EEC (Expected)
- CE marking: Yes
- Normative reference: CR 10260; CR 10261; EN 10002; EN 10017; EN 10020; EN 10021; EN 10024; EN 10025-2; EN 10025-3; EN 10025-4; EN 10025-5; EN 10025-6; EN 10027-1; EN 10027-2; EN 10029; EN 10034; EN 10048; EN 10051; EN 10052; EN 10055; EN 10056-1; EN 10056-2; EN 10058; EN 10059; EN 10060; EN 10061; EN 10067; EN 10079; EN 10160; EN 10162; EN 10164; EN 10168; EN 10204; EN 10279; EN 10306; EN 10308; EN ISO 14284; EN ISO 17642-1; EN ISO 17642-2; EN ISO 17642-3; EN ISO 2566-1; EN ISO 377; EN ISO 643; EN ISO 9001

EN 10025 - Hot rolled products of structural steels refers to a set of European standards which specify the technical delivery conditions for hot rolled products of structural steels. The standards consist of the following parts:

- EN 10025-1: Part 1: General technical delivery conditions
- EN 10025-2: Part 2: Technical delivery conditions for non-alloy structural steels
- EN 10025-3: Part 3: Technical delivery conditions for normalized/normalized rolled weldable fine grain structural steels
- EN 10025-4: Part 4: Technical delivery conditions for thermomechanical rolled weldable fine grain structural steels
- EN 10025-5: Part 5: Technical delivery conditions for structural steels with improved atmospheric corrosion resistance
- EN 10025-6: Part 6: Technical delivery conditions for flat products of high yield strength structural steels in the quenched and tempered condition

== Editions ==
- EN 10025:2019 (current version)
- EN 10025:2005
- EN 10025:1990+A1:1993
- EN 10025:1990

== See also ==
- List of EN standards
- European Committee for Standardization
- EN 1993 Eurocode 3: Design of steel structures
