= EN 3 =

EN 3-x
- EN standard
- Reference: EN 3-x
- Status: Published
- Title: Portable fire extinguishers
- Committee: CEN/TC 70
- Work Item: various
- Directives: 2008/68/EC
- Citation in OJEU: 2008/68/EC (No)
- CE marking: Yes

European standard EN 3 specifies requirements for portable fire extinguishers. Compliance with the standard is legally required for the construction of all fire extinguishers in the European Union.

The standard has been published in 10 parts:

- EN 3-1: Portable fire extinguishers. Description, duration of operation, class A and B fire test.
- EN 3-2: Portable fire extinguishers. Tightness, dielectric test, tamping test, special provisions.
- EN 3-3: Portable fire extinguishers. Construction, resistance to pressure, mechanical tests.
- EN 3-4: Portable fire extinguishers. Charges, minimum required fire.
- EN 3-5: Portable fire extinguishers. Specification and supplementary tests.
- EN 3-6: Portable fire extinguishers. Provisions for the attestation of conformity of portable fire extinguishers in accordance with EN 3-1 to 3-5. Amendment 1
- EN 3-7: Portable fire extinguishers. Characteristics, performance requirements and test methods.
- EN 3-8: Portable fire extinguishers. Additional requirements to EN 3-7 for the construction, resistance to pressure and mechanical tests for extinguishers with a maximum allowable pressure equal to or lower than 30 bar.
- EN 3-9: Portable fire extinguishers. Additional requirements to EN 3-7 for pressure resistance of CO_{2} extinguishers.
- EN 3-10: Portable fire extinguishers. Provisions for evaluating the conformity of a portable fire extinguisher to EN 3-7.

EN 3-1, EN 3-2, EN 3-4 and EN 3-5 have been withdrawn and were replaced by EN 3-7, EN 3-8 and EN 3-9.

EN 3-6 has been withdrawn and was replaced by EN 3-10.

== See also ==
- List of EN standards
- European Committee for Standardization
