= Face shield =

Device used to protect the wearer's face from hazards

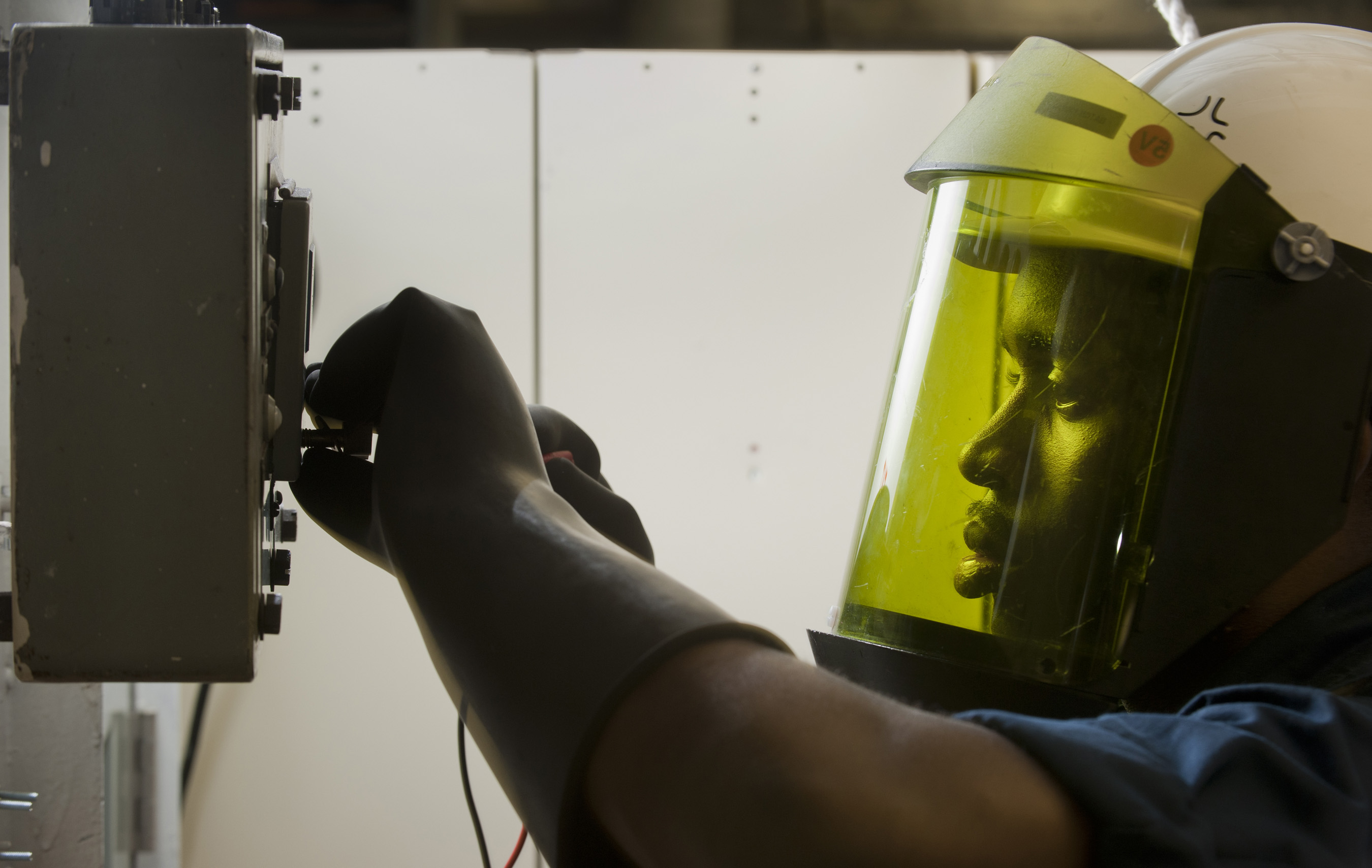
A United States Navy Electrician's Mate wearing a face shield while checking for bad fuses on a lighting panel

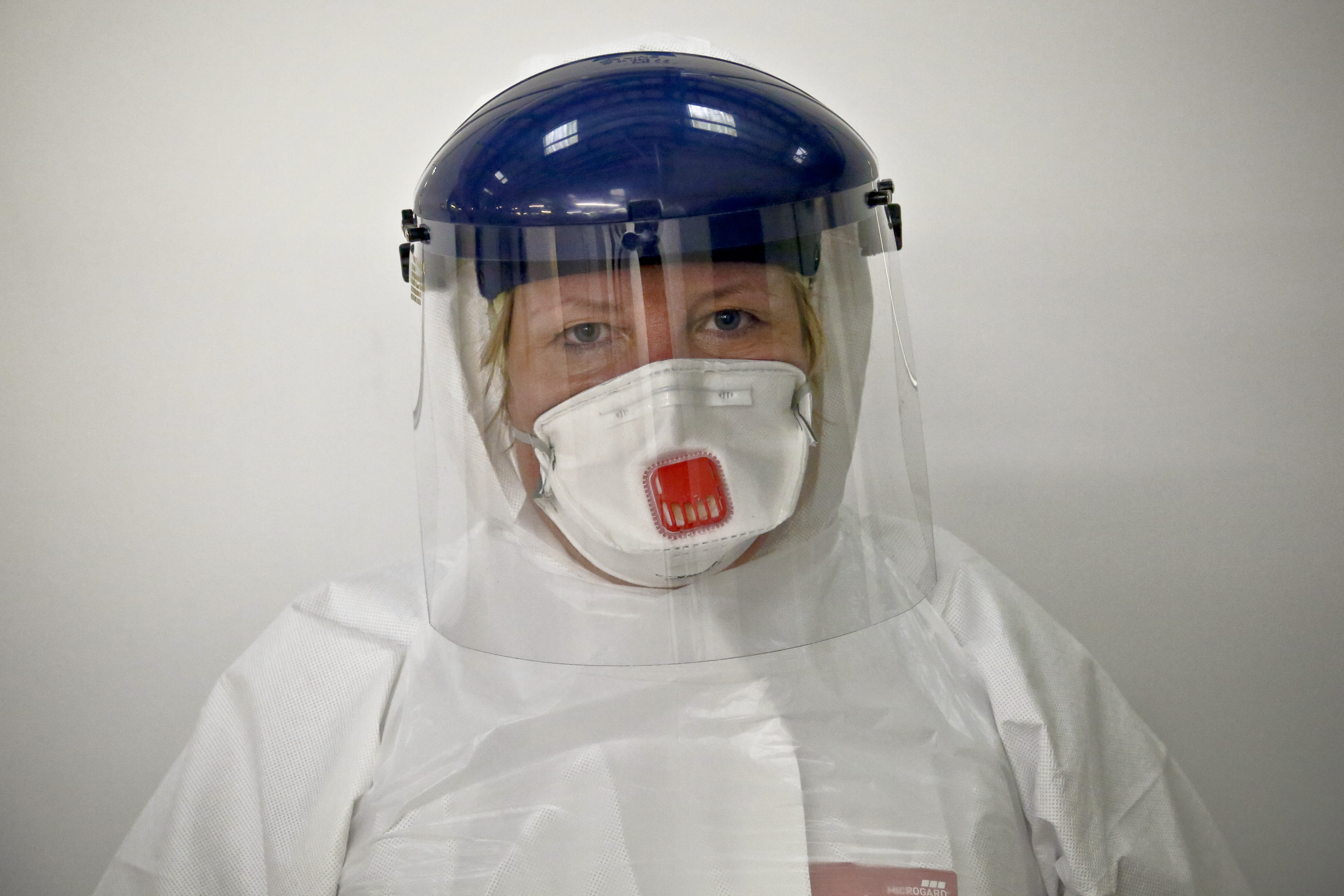
Nurse using a face shield during the Ebola outbreak in Sierra Leone, 2014.

A face shield, an item of personal protective equipment, aims to protect the wearer's entire face (or part of it) from hazards such as flying objects and road debris, chemical splashes (in laboratories or in industry), or potentially infectious materials (in medical and laboratory environments).

== Applications ==
=== Medical ===
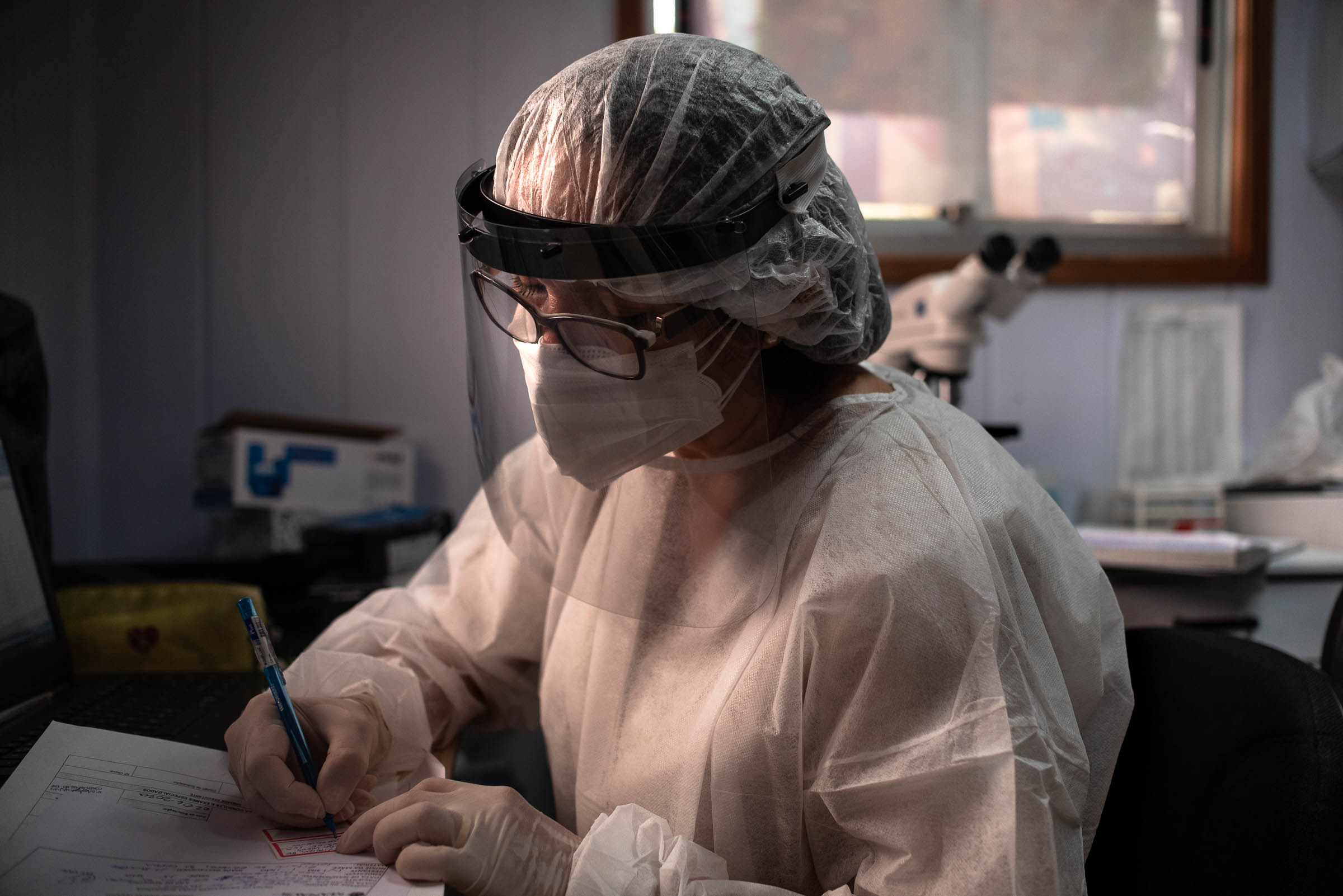
A laboratory technician wearing a face shield during the COVID-19 pandemic in Brazil

A video describing research on the efficacy of face shields to protect against aerosol emitted from coughing

In medical applications the device is used to protect a medical professional during a procedure that might expose them to blood or other potentially infectious fluids or aerosols. An example is the use of a CPR mask while performing rescue breathing or CPR. Another example is the use of face shields to reduce the likelihood of inhaling potentially infectious bioaerosols.

=== Police and military ===
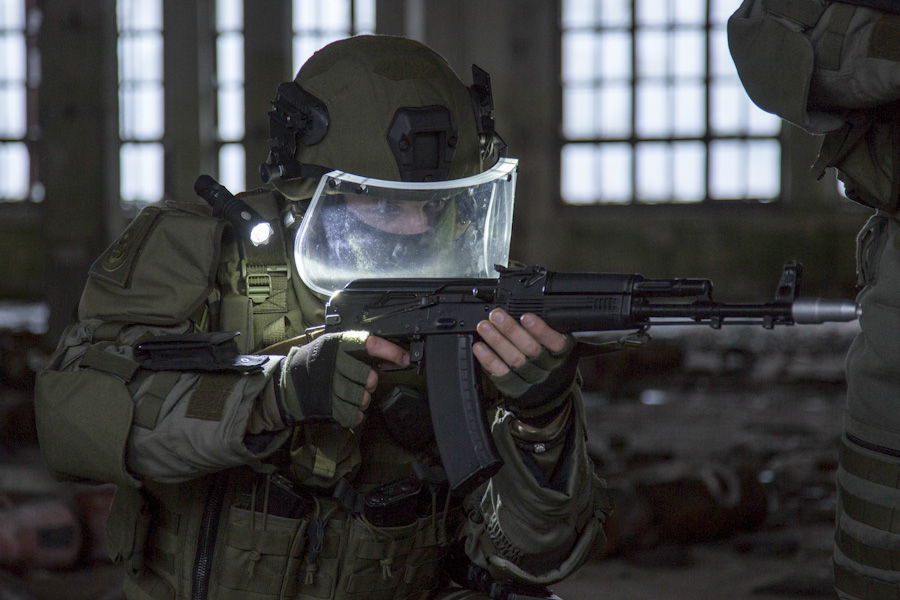
Russian combat engineer with a 6B47 helmet and ballistic face shield

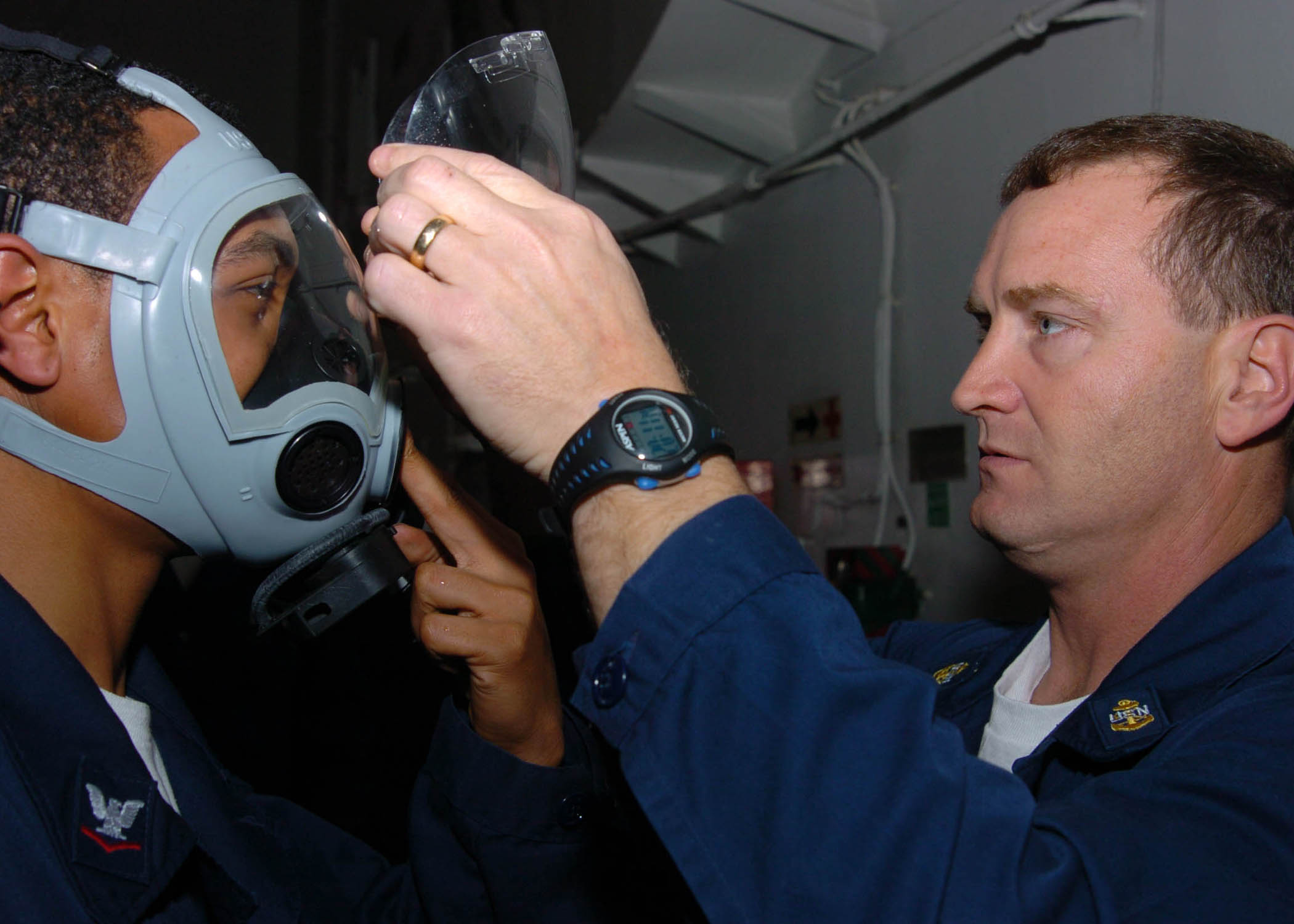
Removing a face shield from a Sailor's MCU-2/P gas mask after washing it with decontamination solution during a General Quarters Drill aboard an aircraft carrier

In military or law enforcement environments, a face shield may be designed for ballistic or non-ballistic protection. The non-ballistic shield will provide no protection from projectiles shot from firearms, but is usually designed to withstand low velocity impacts, like caused by punches or thrown objects.

A ballistic face shield is designed to stop or deflect blast and fragments from operators wearing bomb suits To protect the wearers eyes and face from ballistic threats in combat is envisioned in the PEO Soldier program for the United States Department of Defence.

=== Construction ===
A face shield is intended to protect the wearer's partial or entire face and the eyes from hazards. Face shields should be used with spectacles and/or goggles. On many construction sites many workers use face shields to protect them from debris or sparks. Many tools for cutting and working with metal recommend the use of a face shield. Examples include welding equipment or metal chop saws.

== Manufacturing ==
Two methods are used to manufacture face shields: extrusion and injection molding. Face shields cut from extrusion sheets provide better impact resistance than injection-molded face shields because extrusion sheets are made of high molecular weight plastic pellets while injection molding must use lower molecular weight plastic pellets, which provide better melt flowing property needed by injection molding.

Face shields can be made of polycarbonate which provides excellent impact resistance, optical quality, heat resistance and normal chemical resistance. Or cellulose acetate which provides normal impact resistance, optical quality, heat resistance and good chemical resistance.

Face shields 0.8 mm (0.031 in) thick made of extrusion polycarbonate sheets can withstand the impact of a 6 mm (0.24 in) nominal diameter steel ball traveling at the speed 120 m/s (390 ft/s) (European standard, protection against high-speed particles – medium energy impact), while injection molding face shields must have at least 1.5 mm (0.059 in) thickness to withstand the same impact. But injection molding can provide more complicated shape than extrusion.

During the COVID-19 pandemic, people from 86 countries engaged in the voluntary production of PPE to supplement traditional supply chains - many of which had been interrupted. They collectively produced a total of 25 million face shields with techniques including 3D printing and laser cutting, in addition to injection molding.

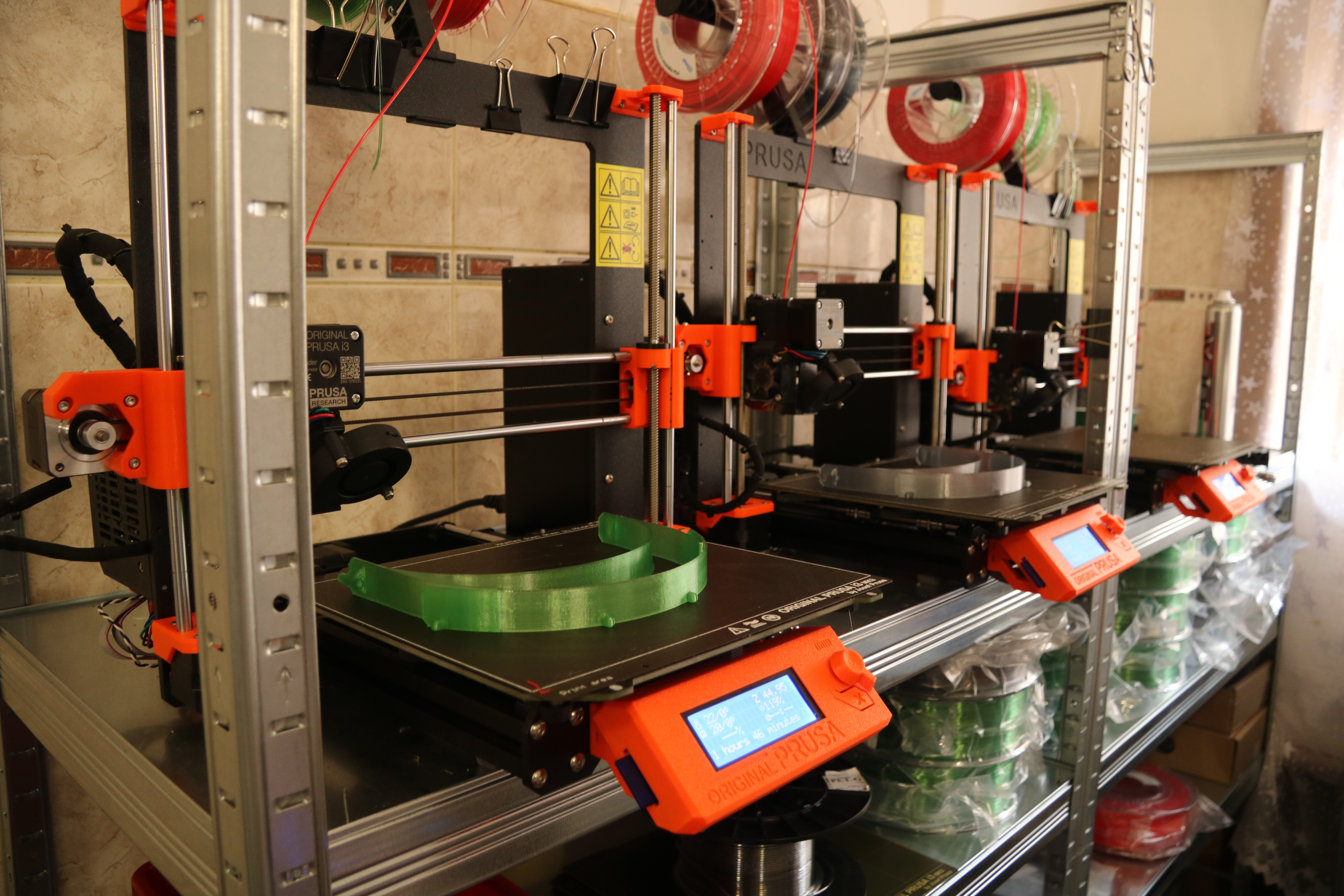
3D printing of face shields during COVID-19 pandemic

3D file for printing a face shield

Buckle for the face shield

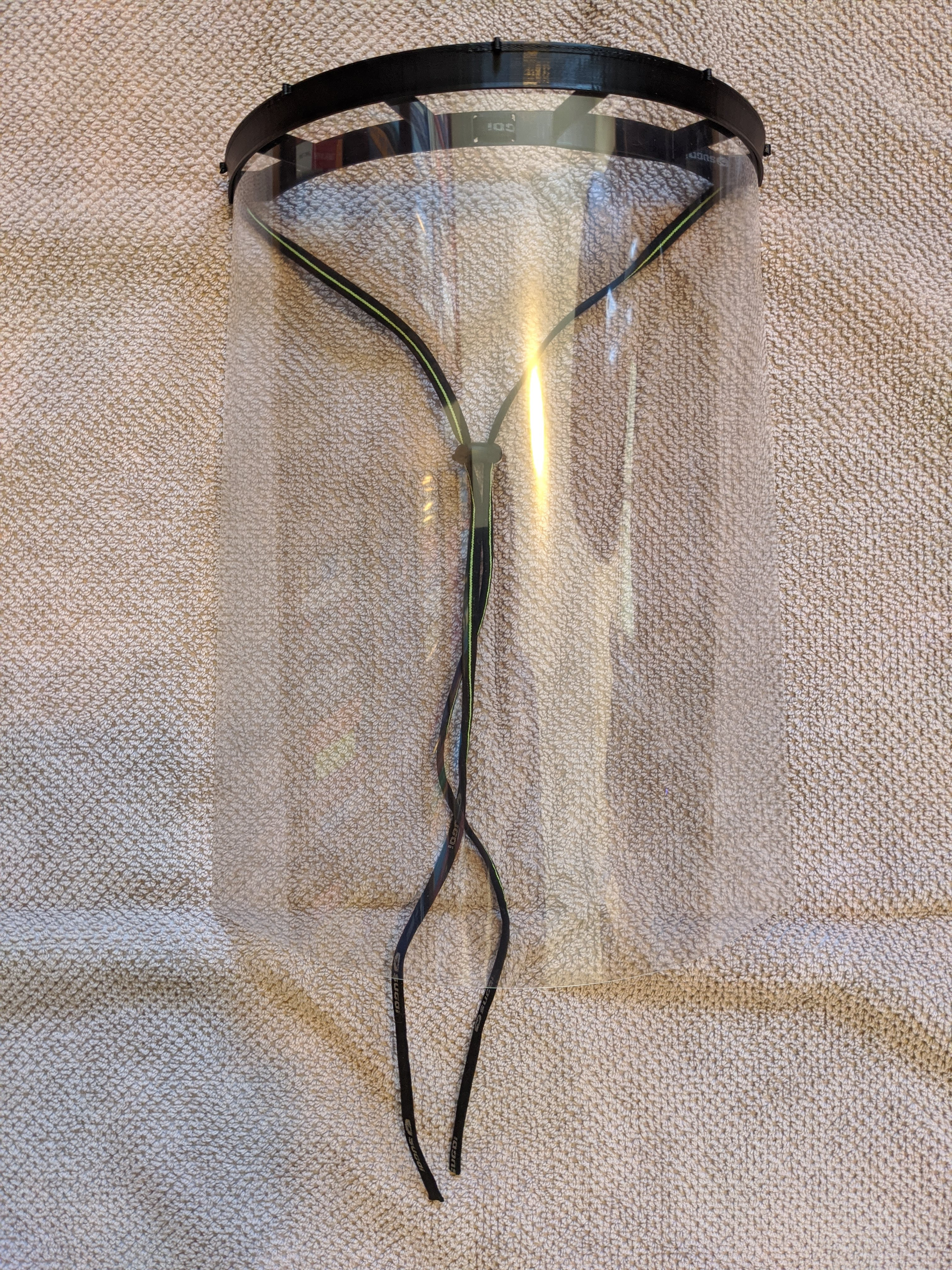
Final shield

== Standards ==
ANSI (American Standard)

- Mark Z87: Basic impact: Faceshields shall be capable of resisting impact from a 25.4 mm (1 in) diameter steel ball dropped from a height of 127 cm (50 in).
- Mark Z87+: High impact: Faceshields shall be capable of resisting impact from a 6.35 mm (0.25 in) diameter steel ball traveling at a velocity of 91.4 m/s (300 ft/s).

EN 166 (European Standard)

These shields are for protection against high-speed particles, and must withstand the impact of a 6 mm nominal diameter steel ball, striking the oculars and the lateral protection at the speed stated.

- Mark A: 190 m/s (620 ft/s)
- Mark B: 120 m/s (390 ft/s).
- Mark F: 45 m/s (150 ft/s).
  - ref. EN166

CSA (Canadian Standard)

Z94.3-15 Eye and Face Protectors Class 6 relates to face shields, and is divided into 3 sub-classes

- 6A – Impact, piercing, splash, head, and glare protection.
- 6B – Radiation protection. Also for low heat, splash, glare, and light non-piercing impact protection.
- 6C – High-heat applications and light non-piercing impact protection only.
  - ref. CSA Z94.3-15

== See also ==
- Pocket mask
- Helmet
- Visor
- Windshield
- Welding helmet
- Face masks during the COVID-19 pandemic
