= EN 50436 =

CENELEC alcohol interlock standard

EN 50436 is a series of European Standards for ignition interlock devices (also called 'alcohol interlocks') on motor vehicles.

An alcohol interlock consists of two main components: an instrument that measures breath alcohol via a mouthpiece inside the vehicle, and a control unit (normally installed under the dashboard) which controls the current supply to the vehicle's starter relay. The alcohol interlock prevents the motor from starting if the driver has an alcohol concentration above a predetermined threshold. The installation is possible in different types of vehicles, including passenger cars, buses, transporters, motorcycles, and trains.

An alcohol interlock may be installed in a vehicle:

- as a general preventive measure for traffic safety, on a voluntary basis or as legally required (for example, in vehicles for transporting children);
- as ordered by a court or an administrative authority as part of a programme for drink-driving-offenders;
- for persons subject to a medical or rehabilitation programme.

== Standard series EN 50436 ==
Since 2003, the series of European Standards EN 50436 ("Alcohol interlocks - Test methods and performance requirements") has been developed by the committee BTTF 116-2 ("Alcohol interlocks") of the European Committee for Electrotechnical Standardization (CENELEC), whose members are nominated by the national standardisation organisations of numerous European countries. They represent ministries, road traffic authorities, road safety organisations, labour unions, testing laboratories as well as manufacturers of alcohol interlocks and vehicles. The secretariat of the committee is organized by Deutsche Kommission Elektrotechnik Elektronik Informationstechnik im DIN und VDE (DKE).

Under the chairmanship of Dr. habil Johannes Lagois, and of Dr. Stefan Morley since 2016, the committee has developed the series EN 50436. Compliance with these standards is required in laws and regulations of several European countries as technical requirement for the use of alcohol interlocks. The series specifies the test procedures and basic performance requirements for alcohol interlocks and gives guidance to authorities, decision makers, manufacturers, purchasers, and users. Additionally, it describes the installation requirements for alcohol interlocks in vehicles.

These standards can be bought through the national standardisation organisations who are CENELEC members, and are available in three languages: English, German, and French.

=== EN 50436-1 ===
"Alcohol interlocks - Test methods and performance requirements - Part 1: Instruments for drink-driving-offender programs"

- 1st edition: November 2005
- Corrigendum to 1st edition: June 2009 (French title changed)
- 2nd edition: January 2014

This European Standard specifies test methods and performance requirements for breath alcohol-controlled alcohol interlocks. It covers alcohol interlocks intended to be used in programmes for drink-driving-offenders and similar uses. This standard also applies to alcohol interlocks integrated into other vehicle control systems, and to accessory devices connected to the alcohol interlock. Its technical details are directed mainly at test laboratories and manufacturers of alcohol interlocks. It defines requirements and test procedures for type testing.

The main tests and requirements described in this standard are:

- measurement accuracy of the alcohol concentration
- environmental tests with different ambient temperatures and humidity
- tests of time to be ready
- durability tests with vibrations and dropping
- measures against circumvention and manipulation
- influence of exhaled gases other than alcohol
- long term behaviour
- electrical tests for supply voltage and durability against short-circuits
- electromagnetic compatibility and electrical disturbances
- instructions for installation and use

The 2nd edition revises the 1st edition, with the number of tests extended and the requirements tightened. The 2nd edition also includes accessory devices authorised by the manufacturer as part of the alcohol interlock system and which are intended to be used in the vehicle during operation. These include, for example, cameras or GPS systems that generate data related to event data of the alcohol interlock, and accessory devices that handle or transfer data for a drink-driving-offender programme.

The content and requirements are based on the experience and necessities of drink-driving-offender programmes in different countries over several decades. Alcohol interlocks used in these programmes should be tested according to and fulfil the requirements of this standard.

=== EN 50436-2 ===
"EN 50436-2: Alcohol interlocks - Test methods and performance requirements - Part 2: Instruments having a mouthpiece and measuring breath alcohol for general preventive use"

- 1st edition: December 2007
- Corrigendum to 1st edition: June 2009 (French title changed)
- 2nd edition: January 2014
- Amendment A1 to 2nd edition: March 2015

This European Standard is similar to EN 50436-1 but is wider in scope, covering general preventive use.

The 2nd edition revises the 1st edition, with the number of tests extended and the requirements tightened. The 2nd edition of EN 50436-2 includes EN 50436-1 (the basic standard), with Part 2 describing only the requirement differences as compared to Part 1. The main differences of the tests and requirements in Part 2 compared to Part 1 are:

- the required temperature range within which the alcohol interlock has to perform and measure properly is −20–70 °C (instead of −40–85 °C);
- the requirement for the measurement accuracy at high alcohol concentrations is reduced (from 0.75 mg/L);
- the provision of a data memory is optional.

Amendment A1 (of 2nd edition) more precisely defines which connectable accessory devices of the alcohol interlock have to be tested.

=== EN 50436-3 ===
"EN 50436-3: Alcohol interlocks - Test methods and performance requirements - Part 3: Guidance for authorities, decision makers, purchasers and users"

- 1st edition: July 2010, published as Technical Report CLC/TR 50436-3
- 2nd edition: December 2016

This European Standard contains numerous recommendations for those interested in the use of alcohol interlocks. However, it is not mandatory and it does not contain any requirements. It is intended as guidance in the selection, installation, use, and maintenance of alcohol interlocks. It is directed to persons interested in alcohol interlocks, to companies selling and installing alcohol interlocks, and to purchasers and users.

This European Standard describes alcohol interlocks used as a general preventive measure in traffic safety as well as in drink-driving-offender programmes.

The 2nd edition revises the 1st edition. Besides the use of alcohol interlocks as a preventive measure, the use in drink-driving-offender programmes is addressed more in detail (for example, with the description of the basic steps of such a programme). Additionally, the 2nd edition contains a compilation of typical parameter settings of the instruments.

=== EN 50436-4 ===
"EN 50436-4: Alcohol interlocks - Test methods and performance requirements - Part 4: Connection between the alcohol interlock and the vehicle"

- 1st edition: March 2007 published as draft prEN 50436-4 (project stopped afterwards)
- New draft under preparation since October 2014

This European Standard will specify a standardised interface between a vehicle and an alcohol interlock for aftermarket installation. It details connector types, the assignment of connector pins, and the digital information to be exchanged between the vehicle and the alcohol interlock via a LIN data bus. It is mostly intended for manufacturers.

This European Standard is applicable to alcohol interlocks for drink-driving-offender programs (as in EN 50436-1) as well as to alcohol interlocks for general preventive use (as in EN 50436-2).

The published draft of the 1st edition was based on the state of the technology at the time; however, it was foreseen that a data bus interface would become the much better solution in the future. This halted the project. In 2014, it was restarted together with the development of Part 7.

=== EN 50436-5 ===
"EN 50436-5: Alcohol interlocks - Test methods and performance requirements - Part 5: Instruments measuring breath alcohol for general preventive use, not having a mouthpiece and compensating by carbon dioxide measurement"

- No draft published (project stopped)

This European Standard was intended to specify additional test procedures and requirements for alcohol interlocks without an exchangeable mouthpiece. In such an instrument, the driver blows against a sampling surface on the alcohol interlock; however, in doing so, the breath is diluted by mixing with ambient air. To determine the actual breath alcohol concentration, techniques are necessary for compensation of the dilution, for example by simultaneously measuring the carbon dioxide concentration.

During the discussion of the draft, however, it was noted that the concentration of exhaled carbon dioxide could strongly vary depending on the physiological condition of the driver, and that determining the breath alcohol concentration with the necessary accuracy was not practically possible.

=== EN 50436-6 ===
"EN 50436-6: Alcohol interlocks - Test methods and performance requirements - Part 6: Data security"

- 1st edition: March 2015

This European Standard specifies additional security requirements for the protection and handling of event records which are stored in the data memory of alcohol interlocks and which may be downloaded, processed, and transferred to supervising persons or organizations. This standard also covers optional accessory devices for alcohol interlocks (e.g. cameras or GPS systems) which generate data, including those for drink-driving-offender programmes. The standard is mainly directed at test houses, manufacturers of alcohol interlocks, legislating authorities, and organizations which handle and use the alcohol interlock event records.

This European Standard is a supplement to EN 50436-1 and EN 50436-2. The respective jurisdiction or a vehicle fleet operator decides whether to apply the standard in addition to EN 50436-1 and EN 50436-2.

This standard has been developed on the basis of the Dutch "Protection Profile" for alcohol interlocks, which is listed under "Common Criteria for Information Technology Security Evaluation".

=== EN 50436-7 ===
"EN 50436-7: Alcohol interlocks - Test methods and performance requirements - Part 7: Installation document"

- 1st edition: December 2016

Alcohol interlocks are often intended for aftermarket installation, in which they are connected to the electric and control circuits of the vehicle. Their installation should not interfere with the proper performance of the vehicle, should not impair the safety and security of the vehicle, and should be as straightforward as possible. Additionally, the installation costs should be low in relation to the total cost of the alcohol interlock. Therefore, it is desirable to have vehicle manufacturers design standardised installation documents to provide technicians the details necessary to install an alcohol interlock into a certain vehicle model.

This European Standard defines the content and the layout of such an installation document, which must detail the vehicle type, connection schematics, accessibility instructions, and recommendations to avoid safety risks. As such, this standard is mostly intended for manufacturers.

This European Standard is applicable to alcohol interlocks for drink-driving-offender programmes (as in EN 50436-1) as well as to alcohol interlocks for general preventive use (as in EN 50436-2). The technical requirements listed in EN 50436-7 mirror the requirements given elsewhere in the series.

To comply with the standard, vehicle manufacturers are mandated to provide at least one of the following three installation options:

1. A traditional installation, in which the voltage supply between the vehicle's ignition switch and the starter system is interrupted. The alcohol interlock is fitted with its output relay into the interrupted starter circuit to enable or disable the start of the motor.
2. A semi-digital connection, in which the vehicle interfaces with the alcohol interlock through fixed signal lines that are established in the vehicle for this purpose. This avoids the interruption of any vehicle (starter) lines.
3. A digital interface, in which an internal data bus exchanges information between the vehicle and the alcohol interlock. Such a digital interface was standardised in Part 4 of the series (EN 50436-4). This part of the series was first published in February 2019 and is currently extended to also cover the CAN data bus in addition to the LIN data bus.

In traditional and semi-digital installations, there are mandatory specified values for current and voltage, which mirror the minimum requirements for alcohol interlocks according to EN 50436-1. In digital interfaces, current and voltage requirements of EN 50436-4 apply, because both sides of the system (the vehicle and the alcohol interlock) must be certified against EN 50436-4.

The use of EN 50436-4 is not mandated by EN 50436-7. This in principle would make other proprietary solutions of vehicle manufacturers possible. Proprietary solutions obviously shall not contradict the requirements for alcohol interlocks given in the series; however, they need to be fully disclosed and described, with their referring test plans in the installation document according to EN 50436-7, and fulfill the current and voltage requirements for the traditional installation. A digital interface is strongly recommended, as it is standardised in EN 50436-4.

In the EU, aftermarket installation of alcohol interlocks is becoming more and more difficult in modern vehicles, generating a barrier for the use of alcohol interlocks. Therefore, it is planned to bindingly prescribe the vehicle manufacturer to prepare an installation document according EN 50436-7 within the framework of the vehicle type approval.
