= EN 12255 =

EN 12255 - Wastewater treatment plants refers to a set of European standards which specify the general requirements for structures and equipment that relate to wastewater treatment plants for a total population of more than 50 PT (population total). This standard, however, does not include the design of a treatment processes itself. The standards consist of the following parts:

- EN 12255-1: Part 1: General construction principles
- EN 12255-2: Part 2: Performance requirements of raw wastewater pumping installations
- EN 12255-3: Part 3: Preliminary treatment
- EN 12255-4: Part 4: Primary settlement
- EN 12255-5: Part 5: Lagooning processes
- EN 12255-6: Part 6: Activated sludge process
- EN 12255-7: Part 7: Biological fixed-film reactors
- EN 12255-8: Part 8: Sludge treatment and storage
- EN 12255-9: Part 9: Odour control and ventilation
- EN 12255-10: Part 10: Safety principles
- EN 12255-11: Part 11: General data required
- EN 12255-12: Part 12: Control and automation
- EN 12255-13: Part 13: Chemical treatment - Treatment of wastewater by precipitation/flocculation
- EN 12255-14: Part 14: Disinfection
- EN 12255-15: Part 15: Measurement of the oxygen transfer in clean water in aeration tanks of activated sludge plants
- EN 12255-16: Part 16: Physical (mechanical) filtration

== See also ==
- List of EN standards
- European Committee for Standardization
