= NORMAPME =

NORMAPME or European Office of Crafts, Trades and Small and Medium-sized Enterprises for Standardisation was created in 1996 by UEAPME with the support of the European Commission. The German name is: Europäisches Büro des Handwerks und der Klein- und Mittelbetriebe für Normung.

NORMAPME participated in the standardisation process on behalf of SMEs and is an associate member of CEN, ISO, CENELEC & ETSI.

NORMAPME has been suspended earlier to the delegates meeting of EMU (European Metal Union) 19 September 2013 in Austria.

== Activities ==
- Technical Committees: NORMAPME recruits experts from SME organisations to follow and report the work in European and International TCs in their fields of expertise.
- Political Interventions: Political influence is possible for NORMAPME through its membership in ISO, CEN, CENELEC & ETSI and through our recognition by the European Commission.
- Projects: NORMAPME aims at providing tools for SMEs and creating European networks

== Information policy ==
Any SMEs can regularly receive from NORMAPME updates on standardisation mandates, ongoing technical committees, issues and stakes for SMEs, and assistance to obtain CE marking, etc...

All publications and the website are translated in six languages: English, French, German, Spanish, Italian and Polish.

== Members ==
Founding members

- Union Européenne de l'Artisanat et des Petites et Moyennes Enterprises
- European Builders Confederation
- European Metal Union
- Jeunes Entrepreneurs de l'Union Européene
- International Federation for the Roofing Trade

Full members

- Comité International de l'Entretien du Textile
- European Consortium of Anchors Produces
- Fédération Européenne et Internationale des Patrons Prothésístes Dentaires
- EUROWINDOOR
- Europäsische Vereinigung des Holzbaus
- Génie Climatique International-Union internationale de la plombiere et de la couverture
- Bureau International Permanent des Associates de Vendeurs et Rechapeurs de pneumatiques
- European Waterpark Association
- European Federation for Elevator Small and Medium-sized Enterprises
- European Lift Components Association
- European Multifoil Manufacturers

Associate members

- Fundació International de la Dona Emprenedora
- Syndicat des Fabricants d’Isolants Réflecteurs Minces Multicouches
- Fédération Nationale des Scieries

Partners

- Council of Small Business of Australia
