= EN 10034 =

- EN standard
- Reference: EN 10034
- Title: Structural steel I and H sections - Tolerances on shape and dimension
- Committee: ECISS/TC 103
- Mandate: M/BC/CEN/87/15

The EN 10034 "Structural steel I and H sections. Tolerances on shape and dimensions" is a European Standard. The standard is developed by the technical committee ECISS/TC 103 - Structural steels other than reinforcements. The standard specifies tolerances on dimensions and mass of I and H structural steel beams.

== See also ==
- I-beam
- EN 10024
