= CISPR 11 =

CISPR 11 is an international standard analog to European standard EN 55011. This is the standard that is very often referenced in all European EMC standards, defining measurement methods, measurement equipment, limit lines and interpretation of applicability of limit lines, starting from household appliances to medical devices.
