= EN 15838 =

EN 15838 is a European standard describing the requirements for service provision for Customer Contact Centres. It was approved by CEN (European Committee for Standardization) on October 5, 2009. The standard is implemented in several countries in Europe via their own national organizations.

== Standard ==
The standard includes areas such as:

- Management strategy and policy
- Processes
- Requirements for Contact Centre agents
- Requirements for Infrastructure
- Customer satisfaction
- Social responsibility
- Mandatory KPIs
- Recommended KPIs
- Best practice guidelines for client organizations

== See also ==
- List of EN standards
