= EN 12566 =

Set of European Standards

EN 12566 - Small wastewater treatment systems for up to 50 PT refers to a set of European Standards which specify the general requirements for packaged and/or site assembled wastewater treatment plants used for domestic wastewater treatment for up to 50 PT (population total). The standards consist of the following parts:

- EN 12566-1: "Part 1: Prefabricated septic tanks" specifies the requirements and test methods for prefabricated septic tank units;
- EN 12566-2: "Part 2: Soil infiltration systems" is a code of practice defining design parameters, construction details, installation, and component requirements for in-situ constructed soil infiltration systems and does not specify any treatment requirements;
- EN 12566-3: "Part 3: Packaged and/or site assembled domestic wastewater treatment plants" specifies the requirements and test methods used to evaluate packaged wastewater treatment plants which are required to treat sewage to a predetermined standard;
- EN 12566-4: "Part 4: Septic tanks assembled in situ from prefabricated kits" is an execution standard specifying pipe sizes, loads, watertightness, marking, and evaluation of conformity for septic tanks assembled in situ from prefabricated kits and ancillary equipment;
- EN 12566-5: "Part 5: Pretreated Effluent Filtration systems" is a code of practise giving design parameters, construction details, installation, and component requirements for filtration systems receiving domestic wastewater from septic tanks;
- EN 12566-6: "Part 6: Prefabricated treatment units for septic tank effluent" specifies requirements, test methods, and evaluation of conformity for prefabricated secondary treatment units used for the treatment of effluent from septic tanks;
- EN 12566-7: "Part 7: Prefabricated tertiary treatment units" specifies requirements, test methods, and evaluation of conformity for a packaged and/or site assembled tertiary treatment unit.

== See also ==
- List of EN standards
- European Committee for Standardization
