= Septic tank =

Method for basic wastewater treatment (on-site)

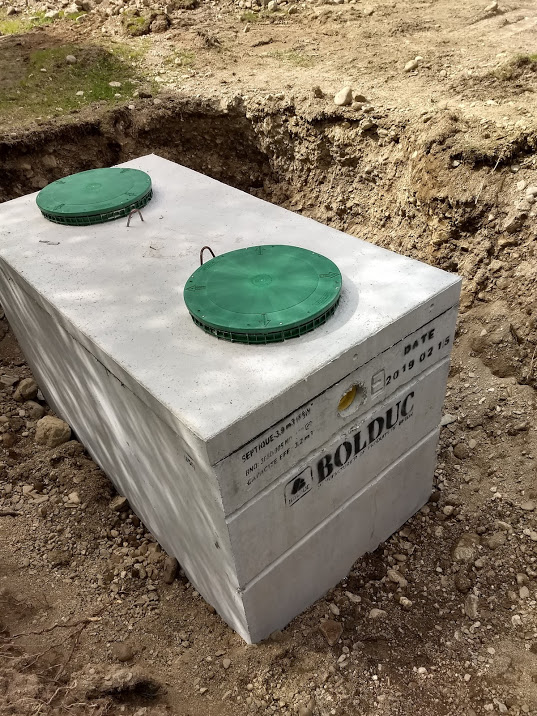
- A septic tank being installed in the ground
- Position in sanitation chain: Collection and storage/treatment (on-site)
- Application level: Household or neighborhood level (schools, hotels etc.)
- Management level: Household, public, shared (most common is household level)
- Inputs: blackwater (waste), greywater, brownwater
- Outputs: Fecal sludge, effluent
- Types: Single tank or multi-chamber septic tanks (potentially with baffles)
- Environmental concerns: Groundwater pollution, water pollution e.g. during floods

A septic tank is an underground chamber made of concrete, fiberglass, or plastic through which domestic wastewater (sewage) flows for basic sewage treatment. Settling and anaerobic digestion processes reduce solids and organics, but the treatment efficiency is only moderate (referred to as "primary treatment"). Septic tank systems are a type of simple onsite sewage facility. They can be used in areas that are not connected to a sewerage system, such as rural areas. The treated liquid effluent is commonly disposed in a septic drain field, which provides further treatment. Nonetheless, groundwater pollution may occur and is a problem.

The term "septic" refers to the anaerobic bacterial environment that develops in the tank that decomposes or mineralizes the waste discharged into the tank. Septic tanks can be coupled with other onsite wastewater treatment units such as biofilters or aerobic systems involving artificially forced aeration.

The rate of accumulation of sludge—also called septage or fecal sludge—is faster than the rate of decomposition. Therefore, the accumulated fecal sludge must be periodically removed, which is commonly done with a vacuum truck.

== Description ==
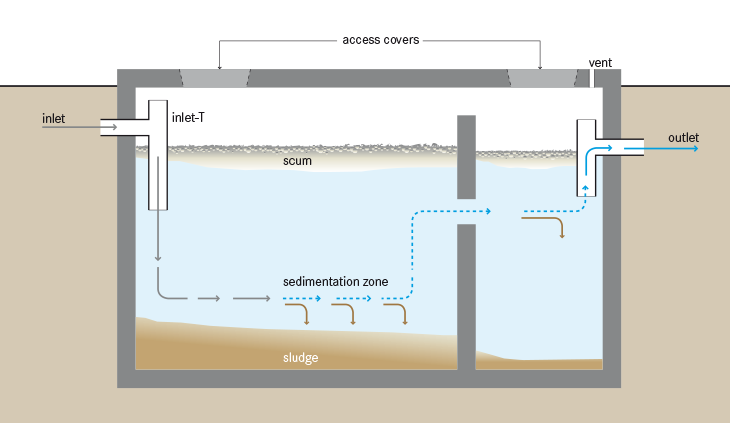
Schematic of a septic tank

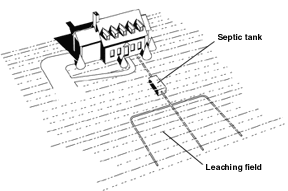
Septic tank and septic drain field

A septic tank consists of one or more concrete or plastic tanks of between 4,500 and 7,500 litres (1,000 and 2,000 gallons); one end is connected to an inlet wastewater pipe and the other to a septic drain field. Generally these pipe connections are made with a T pipe, allowing liquid to enter and exit without disturbing any crust on the surface. Today, the design of the tank usually incorporates two chambers, each equipped with an access opening and cover, and separated by a dividing wall with openings located about midway between the floor and roof of the tank.

Wastewater enters the first chamber of the tank, allowing solids to settle and scum to float. The settled solids are anaerobically digested, reducing the volume of solids. The liquid component flows through the dividing wall into the second chamber, where further settlement takes place. One option for the effluent is the draining into the septic drain field, also referred to as a leach field, drain field or seepage field, depending upon locality. A percolation test is required prior to installation to ensure the porosity of the soil is adequate to serve as a drain field.

Septic tank effluent can also be conveyed to a secondary treatment, typically constructed wetlands. Constructed wetlands benefit from the good performance of septic tanks at removing solids, which avoids them getting clogged quickly.

Septic tank effluent can also be conveyed to a centralized treatment facility.

The remaining impurities are trapped and eliminated in the soil, with the excess water eliminated through percolation into the soil, through evaporation, and by uptake through the root system of plants and eventual transpiration or entering groundwater or surface water. A piping network, often laid in a stone-filled trench (see weeping tile), distributes the wastewater throughout the field with multiple drainage holes in the network. The size of the drain field is proportional to the volume of wastewater and inversely proportional to the porosity of the drainage field. The entire septic system can operate by gravity alone or, where topographic considerations require, with inclusion of a lift pump.

Certain septic tank designs include siphons or other devices to increase the volume and velocity of outflow to the drainage field. These help to fill the drainage pipe more evenly and extend the drainage field life by preventing premature clogging or bioclogging.

An Imhoff tank is a two-stage septic system where the sludge is digested in a separate tank. This avoids mixing digested sludge with incoming sewage. Also, some septic tank designs have a second stage where the effluent from the anaerobic first stage is aerated before it drains into the seepage field.

A properly designed and normally operating septic system is odour-free. Besides periodic inspection and emptying, a septic tank should last for decades with minimal maintenance, with concrete, fibreglass, or plastic tanks lasting about 50 years.

== Emptying (desludging) ==
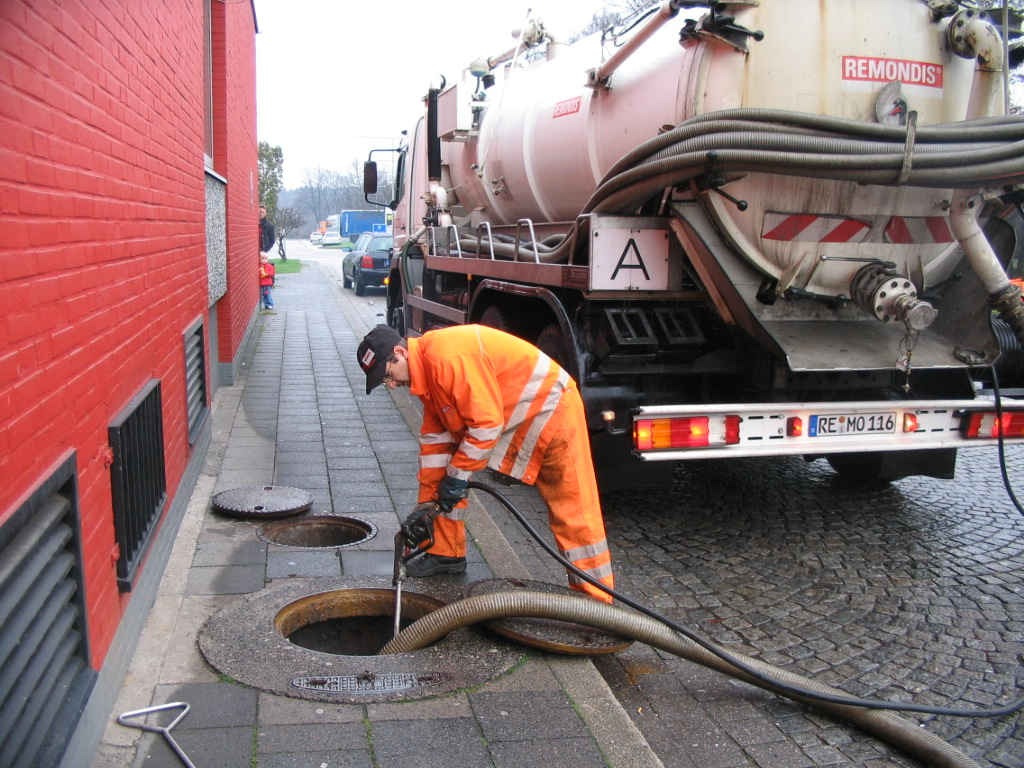
A vacuum truck used to empty septic tanks in Germany

Waste that is not decomposed by the anaerobic digestion must eventually be removed from the septic tank. Otherwise the septic tank fills up and wastewater containing undecomposed material discharges directly to the drainage field. Not only is this detrimental for the environment but, if the sludge overflows the septic tank into the leach field, it may clog the leach field piping or decrease the soil porosity itself, requiring expensive repairs.

When a septic tank is emptied, the accumulated sludge (septage, also known as fecal sludge) is pumped out of the tank by a vacuum truck. How often the septic tank must be emptied depends on the volume of the tank relative to the input of solids, the amount of indigestible solids, and the ambient temperature (because anaerobic digestion occurs more efficiently at higher temperatures), as well as usage, system characteristics and the requirements of the relevant authority.

Some health authorities require tanks to be emptied at prescribed intervals, while others leave it up to the decision of an inspector. Some systems require pumping every few years or sooner, while others may be able to go 10–20 years between pumpings. An older system with an undersize tank that is being used by a large family will require much more frequent pumping than a new system used by only a few people. Anaerobic decomposition is rapidly restarted when the tank is refilled.

An empty tank may be damaged by hydrostatic pressure causing the tank to partially "float" out of the ground, especially in flood situations or very wet ground conditions.

Another option is "scheduled desludging" of septic tanks which has been initiated in several Asian countries including the Philippines, Malaysia, Vietnam, Indonesia, and India. In this process, every property is covered along a defined route and the property occupiers are informed in advance about desludging that will take place.

== Maintenance ==
The maintenance of a septic system is often the responsibility of the resident or property owner. Some forms of abuse or neglect include the following:

=== User's actions ===
- Excessive disposal of cooking oils and grease can cause the inlet drains to block. Oils and grease are often difficult to degrade and can cause odor problems and difficulties with the periodic emptying.
- Flushing non-biodegradable waste items down the toilet such as cigarette butts, cotton buds/swabs or menstrual hygiene products and condoms can cause a septic tank to clog and fill rapidly, so these materials should not be disposed of in that manner. The same applies when the toilet is connected to a sewer rather than a septic tank.
- Using the toilet for disposal of food waste can cause a rapid overload of the system with solids and contribute to failure.
- Certain chemicals may damage the components of a septic tank or kill the bacteria needed in the septic tank for the system to operate properly, such as pesticides, herbicides, materials with high concentrations of bleach or caustic soda (lye), or any other inorganic materials such as paints or solvents.
- Using water softeners – the brine discharge from water softeners may harm the bacteria responsible for breaking down the wastewater. Usually, however, the brine is sufficiently diluted with other wastewater that it does not adversely affect the septic system.

=== Other factors ===
- Roots from trees and shrubbery protruding above the tank or drainfield may clog and/or rupture them. Trees that are directly within the vicinity of a concrete septic tank have the potential to penetrate the tank as the system ages and the concrete begins to develop cracks and small leaks. Tree roots can cause serious flow problems due to plugging and blockage of drain pipes, and the trees themselves tend to expand extremely vigorously due to the ready supply of nutrients from the septic system.
- Playgrounds and storage buildings may cause damage to a tank and the drainage field. In addition, covering the drainage field with an impermeable surface, such as a driveway or parking area, will seriously affect its efficiency and possibly damage the tank and absorption system.
- Excessive water entering the system may overload it and cause it to fail.
- Very high rainfall, rapid snowmelt, and flooding from rivers or the sea can all prevent a drain field from operating, and can cause flow to back up, interfering with the normal operation of the tank. High winter water tables can also result in groundwater flowing back into the septic tank.
- Over time, biofilms develop on the pipes of the drainage field, which can lead to blockage. Such a failure can be referred to as "biomat failure".

=== Septic tank additives ===
Septic tank additives have been promoted by some manufacturers with the aim to improve the effluent quality from septic tanks, reduce sludge build-up and to reduce odors. These additives—which are commonly based on "effective microorganisms"—are usually costly in the longer term and fail to live up to expectations. It has been estimated that in the U.S. more than 1,200 septic system additives were available on the market in 2011. Very little peer-reviewed and replicated field research exists regarding the efficacy of these biological septic tank additives.

== Environmental concerns ==
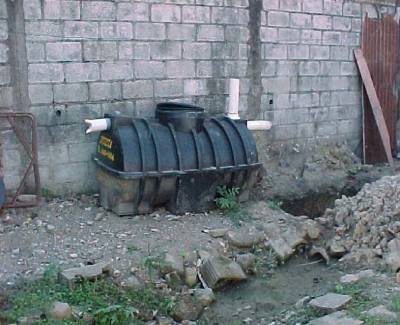
A septic tank before installation, with manhole cover on top

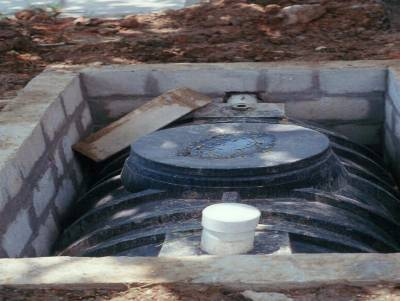
The same tank partially installed in the ground

While a properly maintained and located septic tank poses no higher amount of environmental problems than centralized municipal sewage treatment, certain problems could arise with a septic tank in an unsuitable location, and septic tank failures are typically more expensive to fix or replace than municipal sewer. Since septic systems require large drainfields, they are unsuitable for densely built areas.

=== Odor, gas emissions and carbon footprint ===
Some constituents of wastewater, especially sulfates, under the anaerobic conditions of septic tanks, are reduced to hydrogen sulfide, a pungent and toxic gas. Nitrates and organic nitrogen compounds can be reduced to ammonia. Because of the anaerobic conditions, fermentation and methanogenesis processes take place, which may generate carbon dioxide and/or methane. Both carbon dioxide and methane are greenhouse gases, with methane having a global warming potential about 25 times larger than carbon dioxide. This makes septic tanks potential greenhouse gas emitters. The same methane can be burnt to produce energy for local usage.

=== Nutrients in the effluent ===
Septic tanks by themselves are ineffective at removing nitrogen compounds that have potential to cause algal blooms in waterways into which affected water from a septic system finds its way. This can be remedied by using a nitrogen-reducing technology, such as hybrid constructed wetlands, or by simply ensuring that the leach field is properly sited to prevent direct entry of effluent into bodies of water.

The fermentation processes cause the contents of a septic tank to be anaerobic with a low redox potential, which keeps phosphates in a soluble and, thus, mobilized form. Phosphates discharged from a septic tank into the environment can trigger prolific plant growth including algal blooms, which can also include blooms of potentially toxic cyanobacteria.

The soil's capacity to retain phosphorus is usually large enough to handle the load through a normal residential septic tank. An exception occurs when septic drain fields are located in sandy or coarser soils on property adjacent to a water body. Because of limited particle surface area, these soils can become saturated with phosphates. Phosphates will progress beyond the treatment area, posing a threat of eutrophication to surface waters.

=== Pathogens ===
Diseases extremely dangerous to human contact such as E. coli and other coliform bacteria are often reported following failures of septic tanks.

A properly functioning septic system, on the other hand, provides significant reduction of pathogens compared to direct discharge due to settling (in the tank) and soil absorption (in the drain field). Log reductions of 4–8 for coliform bacteria, 0–2 for viruses are achieved in the effluent. Parasitic worm eggs are also removed. Additional filters may be added to improve removal performance although they will need to be replaced periodically.

=== Groundwater pollution ===
In areas with high population density, groundwater pollution beyond acceptable limits may occur. Some small towns experience the costs of building very expensive centralized wastewater treatment systems because of this problem, due to the high cost of extended collection systems. To reduce residential development that might increase the demand to construct an expensive centralized sewerage system, building moratoriums and limitations on the subdivision of property are often imposed. Ensuring existing septic tanks are functioning properly can also be helpful for a limited time, but becomes less effective as a primary remediation strategy as population density increases.

=== Surface water pollution ===
In areas adjacent to water bodies with fish or shellfish intended for human consumption, improperly maintained and failing septic systems contribute to pollution levels that can force harvest restrictions and/or commercial or recreational harvest closures.

== Use ==
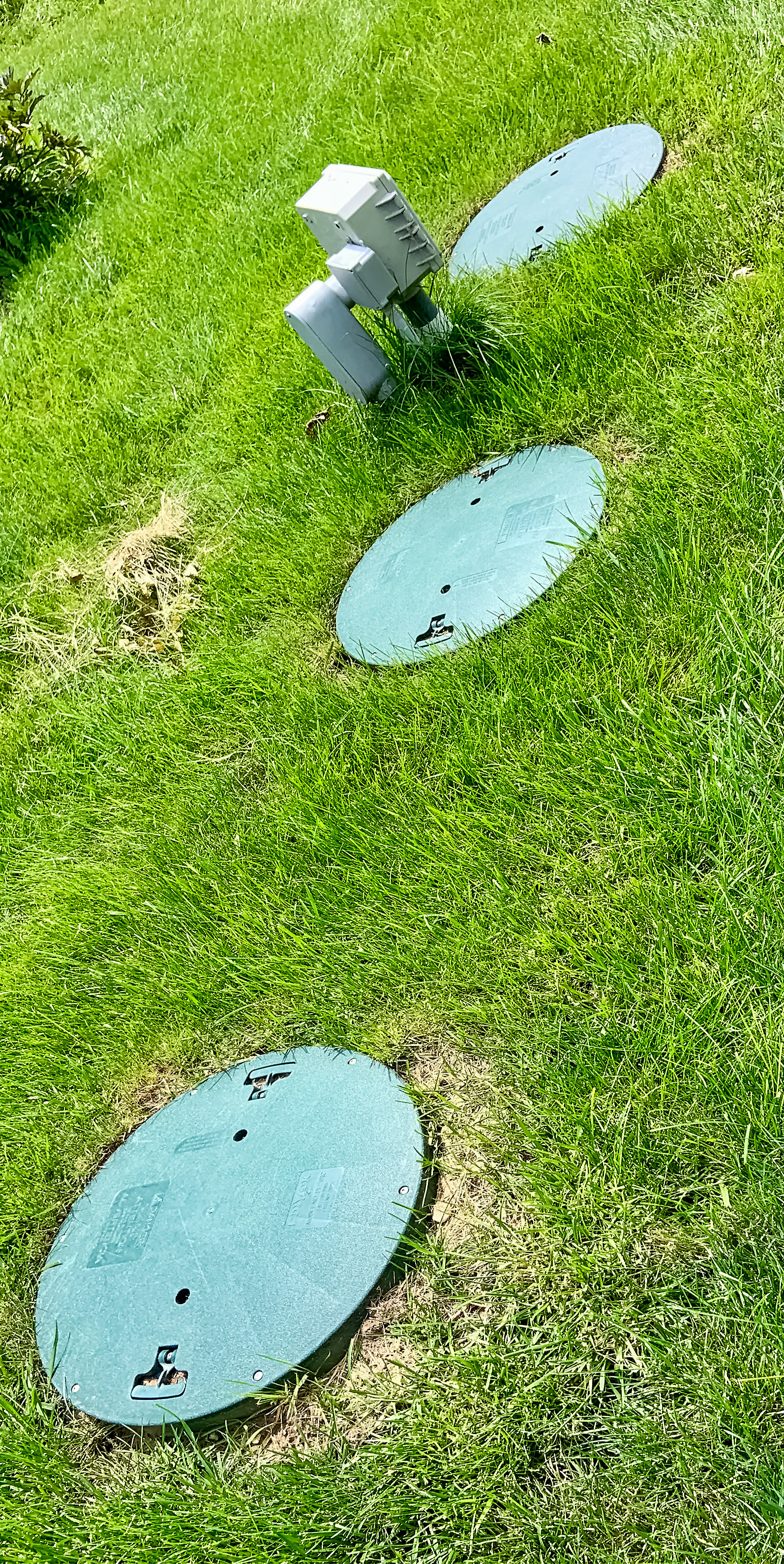
Septic tank system in rural Southern Minnesota

In the United States, the 2008 American Housing Survey indicated that about 20 percent of all households rely on septic tanks, and that the overwhelming majority of systems are located in rural (50%) and suburban (47%) areas. Indianapolis is one example of a large city where many of the city's neighborhoods still rely on separate septic systems. In Europe, septic systems are generally limited to rural areas.

== Regulations ==
=== European Union ===
In the European Union the EN 12566 standard provides the general requirements for packaged and site assembled treatment plants used for domestic wastewater treatment.

Part 1 (EN 12566-1) is for septic tanks that are prefabricated or factory manufactured and made of polyethylene, glass reinforced polyester, polypropylene, PVC-U, steel or concrete. Part 4 (EN 12566-4) regulates septic tanks that are assembled on site from prefabricated kits, generally of concrete construction. Certified septic tanks of both types must pass a standardized hydraulic test to assess their ability to retain suspended solids within the system. Additionally, their structural adequacy in relevant ground conditions is assessed in terms of water-tightness, treatment efficiency, and structural behaviour.

==== France ====
In France, about 4 million households (or 20% of the population) are using on-site wastewater disposal systems (l'assainissement non collectif), including septic tanks (fosse septique). The legal framework for regulating the construction and maintenance of septic systems was introduced in 1992 and updated in 2009 and 2012 with the intent to establish the technical requirements applicable to individual sewerage systems. Septic tanks in France are subject to inspection by SPANC (Service Public d'Assainissement Non Collectif), a professional body appointed by the respective local authorities to enforce wastewater collection laws, at least once in four years. Following the introduction of EN 12566, the discharge of effluent directly into ditches or watercourses is prohibited, unless the effluent meets prescribed standards.

==== Ireland ====
According to the Census of Ireland 2011, 27.5% of Irish households (i.e. about 440,000 households), with the majority in rural areas, use an individual septic tank.

Following a European Court of Justice judgment made against Ireland in 2009 that deemed the country non-compliant with the Waste Framework Directive in relation to domestic wastewaters disposed of in the countryside, the Water Services (Amendment) Act 2012 was passed in order to regulate wastewater discharges from domestic sources that are not connected to the public sewer network and to provide arrangements for registration and inspection of existing individual domestic wastewater treatment systems.

Additionally, a code of practice has been developed by the Environmental Protection Agency to regulate the planning and construction of new septic tanks, secondary treatment systems, septic drain fields and filter systems. Direct discharge of septic tank effluent into groundwater is prohibited in Ireland, while the indirect discharge via unsaturated subsoil into groundwater, e.g. by means of a septic drain field, or the direct discharge into surface water is permissible in accordance with a Water Pollution Act license. Registered septic tanks must be desludged by an authorized contractor at least once a year; the removed fecal sludge is disposed of, either to a managed municipal wastewater treatment facility or to agriculture provided that nutrient management regulations are met.

=== United Kingdom ===
Since 2015, only certain property owners in England and Wales with septic tanks or small packaged sewage treatment systems need to register their systems, and either apply for a permit or qualify for an exemption with the Environment Agency. Permits need to be granted to systems that discharge more than a certain volume of effluent in a given time or that discharge effluent directly into sensitive areas (e.g., some groundwater protection zones). In general, permits are not granted for new septic tanks that discharge directly into surface waters. A septic tank discharging into a watercourse must be replaced or upgraded by 1 January 2020 to a Sewage Treatment Plant (also called an Onsite sewage facility), or sooner if the property is sold before this date, or if the Environment Agency (EA) finds that it is causing pollution.

In Northern Ireland, the Department of the Environment must give permission for all wastewater discharges where it is proposed that the discharge will go to a waterway or soil infiltration system. The discharge consent will outline conditions relating to the quality and quantity of the discharge in order to ensure the receiving waterway or the underground aquifer can absorb the discharge.

The Water Environment Regulations 2011 regulate the registration of septic tank systems in Scotland. Proof of registration is required when new properties are being developed or existing properties change ownership.

=== Australia ===
In Australia, septic tank design and installation requirements are regulated by State Governments, through Departments of Health and Environmental Protection Agencies. Regulation may include Codes of Practice and Legislation. Regulatory requirements for the design and installation of septic tanks commonly references Australian Standards (1547 and 1546). Capacity requirements for septic tanks may be outlined within Codes of Practice, and can vary between states.

Mainly because of water leaching from the effluent drains of a lot of closely spaced septic systems, many council districts (e.g. Sunshine Coast, Queensland) have banned septic systems, and require them to be replaced with much more expensive small-scale sewage treatment systems that actively pump air into the tank, producing an aerobic environment. Septic systems have to be replaced as part of any new building applications, regardless of how well the old system performed.

=== United States ===
According to the US Environmental Protection Agency, in the United States it is the home owners' responsibility to maintain their septic systems. Anyone who ignores this requirement will eventually experience costly repairs when solids escape the tank and clog the clarified liquid effluent disposal system.

In Washington, for example, a "shellfish protection district" or "clean water district" is a geographic service area designated by a county to protect water quality and tideland resources. The district provides a mechanism to generate local funds for water quality services to control non-point sources of pollution, such as septic system maintenance. The district also serves as an educational resource, calling attention to the pollution sources that threaten shellfish growing waters.

== Slang usage ==
The term "septic tank", or more usually "septic", is used in some parts of Britain as a slang term to refer to Americans, from Cockney rhyming slang septic tank equalling yank. This is sometimes further shortened to "seppo" by Australians.

== See also ==
- Cesspit
- Fecal sludge management
- Grease trap
- Sanitation
- Off-the-grid
