= EN 50155 =

Standard for railway rolling stock electronics

EN 50155 is a European standard for electronic equipment used in railway rolling stock applications. It demonstrates requirements of this electronic equipment, including temperature, humidity, shock, vibration, and other parameters to ensure reliability under harsh rail environments.
