= Malamud decision =

In the Malamud decision, the European Court of Justice (ECJ) held on 5 March 2024 in Case C-588/21 P that there may be an overriding public interest in the dissemination of harmonised European standards.

== Background ==
Carl Malamud of Public.Resource.Org and Irish non-profit Right To Know had requested access to several European standards. The European Commission refused to make the requested European standards for toy safety available free of charge, whereupon public.resource.org and Right To Know filed a lawsuit. The ECJ ruled that those harmonised technical standards (HTN) that are mandatory are part of Union law. As the principle of the rule of law requires free access to Union law, these standards must be accessible free of charge. However, the Court did not generally rule out copyright protection for harmonised standards.

Free access to some harmonised standards is now possible after registration, see Access to documents
