= EN 166 =

EN 166:2001 Personal Eye-Protection - Specifications is a European standard. It concerns the area of eye protection. It replaced EN 166:1995.

== History ==
Year	Description
1995	EN 166 (1st Edition)
2001	EN 166 (2nd Edition)
