= European Committee for Electrotechnical Standardization =

Standards organization

- Comité Européen de Normalisation Électrotechnique; Europäisches Komitee für elektrotechnische Normung
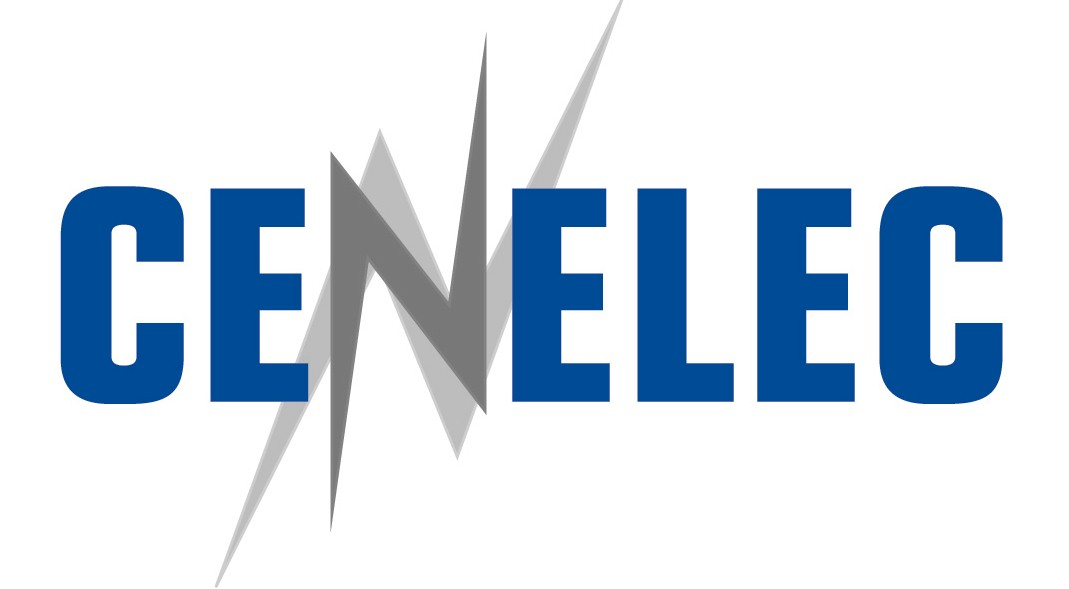

- Countries in the CENELEC community Members Affiliates Companion Standardization Bodies
- Abbreviation: CENELEC
- Formation: 1973
- Type: Regional standards organization
- Region served: Europe
- Website: cenelec.eu

CENELEC (French: Comité Européen de Normalisation Électrotechnique; English: European Committee for Electrotechnical Standardization) is responsible for European standardization in the area of electrical engineering. Together with ETSI (telecommunications) and CEN (other technical areas), it forms the European system for technical standardization. Standards harmonised by these agencies are regularly adopted in many countries outside Europe which follow European technical standards. Although CENELEC works closely with the European Union, it is not an EU institution. Nevertheless, its standards are "EN" EU (and EEA) standards, thanks to EU Regulation 1025/2012.

CENELEC is a non-profit organization under Belgian law, based in Brussels. The members are the national electrotechnical standardization bodies of most European countries. The standards are published in three official, authoritative language versions (in cooperation with CEN, unless something else is agreed): English, French and German. Members that have another official language then make a national translation. English versions are generally the primary references.

== Agreement types ==
=== Members ===
As of 2026, CENELEC has 34 full members, including all 27 EU members, 3 EFTA members, as well as North Macedonia, Serbia, Turkey, and the United Kingdom.

- Austria
- Belgium
- Bulgaria
- Croatia
- Cyprus
- Czechia
- Denmark
- Estonia
- Finland
- France
- Germany
- Greece
- Hungary
- Iceland
- Ireland
- Italy
- Latvia
- Lithuania
- Luxembourg
- Malta
- Netherlands
- North Macedonia
- Norway
- Poland
- Portugal
- Romania
- Serbia
- Slovakia
- Slovenia
- Spain
- Sweden
- Switzerland
- Turkey
- United Kingdom

=== Affiliates ===
As of 2026 CENELEC has 6 affiliate members, all of which are candidates for EU accession:

- Albania
- Bosnia and Herzegovina
- Georgia
- Moldova
- Montenegro
- Ukraine

=== Others ===
As of 2026 CENELEC has signed Companion Standardization Body agreements with 6 countries:

- Israel
- Ivory Coast
- Japan
- Jordan
- Kazakhstan
- Tunisia

== History ==
CENELEC was founded in 1973. Before that two organizations were responsible for electrotechnical standardization: CENELCOM and CENEL. After the Dresden Agreement (1996), CENELEC coordinates standard development activities with IEC. Older IEC standards were converted in 1997 by adding 60000, for example IEC 27 became IEC 60027 and the same standards are also published in the EN 60000 series to indicate adoption by CENELEC as a European standard; for example IEC 60034 is also available as EN 60034. Regional European standards issued by CENELEC, which are not adopted IEC standards, are numbered in the EN 50000 series.

As of 2017, more than 90% of the standards passed by CENELEC used the Dresden Agreement process. The alternative process in which a member National Committee proposes a standard is called the Vilamoura process (or procedure).

The Dresden Agreement was updated with the Frankfurt Agreement in October 2016, and decisions are detailed in CENELEC Guide 13 (2016). Following the publication of this guide, IEC standards adopted by CENELEC shall be referenced as "EN IEC 6xxxx".

=== Voting ===
As of 2001, a weighted voting system was in place, with member countries having the following number of votes:

- France, Germany, Italy, and UK: 10 votes (each)
- Spain: 8 votes
- Belgium, Greece, Netherlands, Portugal, and Switzerland: 5 votes
- Austria and Sweden: 4 votes
- Denmark, Finland, Ireland and Norway: 3 votes
- Luxembourg: 2 votes
- Iceland: 1 vote

For a proposal to pass, 71% of members need be in favor (according to weighted system above) or 71% of EEA members need be in favor, excluding Switzerland.

As of 2017 this system was updated as follows:

- France, Germany, Italy, UK (non-EU), Turkey (non-EU): 29 votes (each)
- Poland and Spain: 27 votes
- Romania: 14 votes
- Netherlands: 13 votes
- Belgium, Czechia, Greece, Hungary, and Portugal: 12 votes
- Austria, Bulgaria, Sweden, and (non-EU) Switzerland: 10 votes
- Croatia, Denmark, Finland, Ireland, Lithuania, Slovakia, and (non-EU) Norway: 7 votes
- Cyprus, Estonia, Latvia, Luxembourg, Slovenia, and (non-EU) North Macedonia: 4 votes
- Malta and (non-EU) Iceland: 3 votes

The weighted voting standard was maintained at 71%, meaning that if the 17 largest-weight countries vote for a standard it will pass this also means the top 50% by weight countries voting in favor. If a proposal does not pass this way, a second vote taking into account only EU members is taken, with the threshold again being 71%. However, unlike EU member states, non-EU CENELEC member countries are not required to transfer EN standards into national standards, although they usually do so.

== See also ==
- European Committee for Standardization (CEN)
- European Telecommunications Standards Institute (ETSI)
- European Office of Crafts, Trades and Small and Medium-sized Enterprises for Standardisation (NORMAPME)
- European Norms Electrical Certification (ENEC)
- Malamud decision
