= European Standard =

European technical norm for trade

European Standards, sometimes called Euronorm (abbreviated EN, from the German name Europäische Norm, "European Norm"), are technical standards which have been ratified by one of the three European Standards Organizations (ESO): European Committee for Standardization (CEN), European Committee for Electrotechnical Standardization (CENELEC), or European Telecommunications Standards Institute (ETSI). All ENs are designed and created by all standards organizations and interested parties through a transparent, open, and consensual process.

European Standards are a key component of the European single market. They are crucial in facilitating trade and have high visibility among manufacturers inside and outside the European territory. A standard represents a model specification, a technical solution against which a market can trade.

European Standards must be transposed into a national standard in all EU member states. This guarantees that a manufacturer has easier access to the market of all these European countries when applying European Standards. Member countries must also withdraw any conflicting national standard: the EN supersedes any national standard. The current trend in Europe is oriented towards the harmonization of national standards under the Euronorm family. Here, Euronorm becomes the equivalent of a national standard in all member countries and replaces any prior conflicting national standard.

== Numbering and naming ==
Number assignment starts with EN 1 (Flued oil stoves with vaporizing burners). The following predefined number ranges are an exception.

Number range	Comment
EN 1 to EN 99	Original work of the European Committee for Standardization (CEN)
EN 1000 to EN 1999	Original work of the European Committee for Standardization (CEN)
EN 2000 to EN 6999	Standards prepared by the AeroSpace and Defence Industries Association of Europe (ASD STAN)
EN 10000 to EN 19999	Number range to reserve
EN 20000 to EN 29999	Obsolete numbering for standards adopted by the International Organization for Standardization (ISO) adopted standards. ISO NNNN" became "EN 2NNNN", e.g. ISO 2338 = EN 22338 (currently: EN ISO 2338)
EN 40000 to EN 49999	Refer to IT standards and were developed by CEN or CENELEC.
EN 50000 to EN 59999	CENELEC standards
EN 60000 to EN 69999	CENELEC standards based on International Electrotechnical Commission (IEC) standards, with or without amendments
EN 100000 to EN 299999	CENELEC Electronic Components Committee (CECC) documents for quality evaluation for electronic components
EN 300000 to EN 399999	Standards of the European Telecommunications Standards Institute (ETSI)

Since standards are updated as needed (they are reviewed for currency approximately every five years), it is useful to specify a version. The year of origin is added after the standard, separated by a colon, example: EN 50126:1999.

In addition to the EN standards mentioned, there are also the EN ISO standards with the numbers ISO 1 to 59999 and the EN IEC standards from IEC 60000 to 79999, as well as EN standards outside the defined number ranges.

When an EN is adopted by a national standards body into the national body of standards, it is given the status of a national standard (e.g. German Institute for Standardisation (DIN), Austrian Standards International (ÖNORM), Austrian Standards International (SN)). The name is then prefixed by the country-specific abbreviation (e.g. ÖNORM EN ...), and the number of the European standard is usually adopted, e.g. DIN EN ISO 2338:1998 or ÖNORM EN ISO 9001:2000.

== Where to find European standards ==
European Standards can be found on the respective Catalogues of the European Standardization Bodies (CEN, CENELEC and ETSI). The national adoptions of the European Standards can be found on the respective catalogues of the National Standardization Bodies or on the websites of the authorised resellers.

== European Standards and the European legislation ==
CEN develops European Standards for a wide range of products, materials, services and processes. Some sectors covered by CEN include transport equipment and services, chemicals, construction, consumer products, defence and security, energy, food and feed, health and safety, healthcare, digital sector, machinery or services. CEN adopts ISO standards in Europe, through the prefix “EN ISO” and cooperates with the International Standardization Organization through the Vienna Agreement, avoiding duplication of work and coherency in their respective catalogues of standards. CEN develops Harmonized Standards supporting the General Product Safety Regulation (GPSR, repealing the General Product Safety Directive GPSD), as well as supporting a wide range of New Legislative Framework / New Approach directives and regulations. Harmonised standards provide presumption of conformity with the Essential Requirements in certain pieces of EU legislation.

CENELEC, the European Committee for Electrotechnical Standardization is the European Standardization organization corresponding to the International Electrotechnical Commission (IEC), or IEC International Standards, adopted in Europe. CENELEC standards support the application of the Low Voltage Directive, Electromagnetic Compatibility Directive, Radio Equipment Directive, Ecodesign, Energy Efficiency Labelling, Machinery or Medical Devices, amongst other European legislation. Some New Legislative Framework Directives and Regulations include, amongst others:

- Low Voltage Directive – LVD or Directive 2014/35/EU of the European Parliament and of the Council of 26 February 2014 on the harmonisation of the laws of the Member States relating to the making available on the market of electrical equipment designed for use within certain voltage limits
- Electromagnetic Compatibility Directive – EMCD or Directive 2014/30/EU of the European Parliament and of the Council of 26 February 2014 on the harmonisation of the laws of the Member States relating to electromagnetic compatibility
- Machinery Directive, Machinery Safety Directive, MD or Directive 2006/42/EC of the European Parliament and of the Council of 17 May 2006 on machinery. Machinery Safety Regulation, or MR, or Regulation (EU) 2023/1230 of the European Parliament and of the Council of 14 June 2023 on machinery
- Radio Equipment Directive – RED or Directive 2014/53/EU of the European Parliament and of the Council of 16 April 2014 on the harmonisation of the laws of the Member States relating to the making available on the market of radio equipment
- Energy efficiency labelling regulation and Ecodesign directive and associated implementing regulations
- Construction Products Regulation (CPR-2024) – Regulation (EU) 2024/3110 of the European Parliament and of the Council establishing harmonised rules for the marketing of construction products (and its predecessor CPR-2011).

== Access to European standards ==
For four European standards the European Court of Justice decided on 5 March 2024 that these must be made available free of charge because these standards are part of European Union law. See also Malamud decision.

== See also ==
- List of EN standards
- Eurocodes
