= Eurocode 4: Design of composite steel and concrete structures =

Design of buildings and civil engineering works standard

Logo of Eurocode 4

In the Eurocode series of European standards (EN) related to construction, Eurocode 4: Design of composite steel and concrete structures (abbreviated EN 1994 or, informally, EC 4) describes how to design of composite structures, using the limit state design philosophy. It was approved by the European Committee for Standardization (CEN) on 4 November 2004. Eurocode 4 is divided in two parts EN 1994-1 and EN 1994-2.

Eurocode 4 is intended to be used in conjunction with:

- EN 1990: Eurocode - Basis of structural design;
- EN 1991: Eurocode 1 - Actions on structures;
- ENs, hENs, ETAGs and ETAs for construction products relevant for composite structures;
- EN 1090: Execution of steel structures and aluminium structures;
- EN 13670: Execution of concrete structures;
- EN 1992: Eurocode 2 - Design of concrete structures;
- EN 1993: Eurocode 3 - Design of steel structures;
- EN 1997: Eurocode 7 - Geotechnical design;
- EN 1998: Eurocode 8 - Design of structures for earthquake resistance, when composite structures are built in seismic regions.

== Part 1-1: General rules and rules for buildings ==
EN 1994-1-1 gives a general basis for the design of composite structures together with specific rules for buildings.

=== Contents ===
- General
- Basis of design
- Materials
- Durability
- Structural analysis
- Ultimate limit states
- Serviceability limit states
- Constructional details in buildings structures
- Composite slab with steel grids for the buildings

== Part 1-2: Structural fire design ==
EN 1994-1-2 deals with the design of composite steel and concrete structures for the accidental situation of fire exposure and is intended to be used in conjunction with EN 1994-1-1 and EN 1991-1-2. This part only identifies differences from, or supplements to, normal temperature design and deals only with passive methods of fire protection. Active methods are not covered.

== Part 2: General rules and rules for bridges ==
EN 1994-2 gives design rules for steel-concrete composite bridges or members of bridges, additional to the general rules in EN 1994-1-1. Cable stayed bridges are not fully covered by this part.

=== Contents ===
- General
- Basis of design
- Materials
- Durability
- Structural analysis
- Ultimate limit states
- Serviceability limit states
- Decks with precast concrete slabs
- Composite plates in bridges
