= Eurocode 3: Design of steel structures =

Steel structure design standard

Logo of Eurocode 3

In the Eurocode series of European standards (EN) related to construction, Eurocode 3: Design of steel structures (abbreviated EN 1993 or, informally, EC 3) describes how to design steel structures, using the limit state design philosophy.

It was approved by the European Committee for Standardization (CEN) on 16 April 2004. Eurocode 3 comprises 20 documents dealing with the different aspects of steel structure design:

- EN 1993-1-1: General rules and rules for buildings.
- EN 1993-1-2: General rules - Structural fire design.
- EN 1993-1-3: General rules - Supplementary rules for cold-formed members and sheeting.
- EN 1993-1-4: General rules - Supplementary rules for stainless steels.
- EN 1993-1-5: General rules - Plated structural elements.
- EN 1993-1-6: General rules - Strength and stability of shell structures.
- EN 1993-1-7: General rules - Strength and stability of planar plated structures subject to out of plane loading.
- EN 1993-1-8: Design of joints.
- EN 1993-1-9: Fatigue.
- EN 1993-1-10: Material toughness and through-thickness properties.
- EN 1993-1-11: Design of structures with tension components.
- EN 1993-1-12: General - High strength steels.
- EN 1993-2: Steel bridges.
- EN 1993-3-1: Towers, masts and chimneys – Towers and masts.
- EN 1993-3-2: Towers, masts and chimneys – Chimneys
- EN 1993-4-1: Silos
- EN 1993-4-2: Storage tanks
- EN 1993-4-3: Pipelines
- EN 1993-5: Deep foundation (piling)
- EN 1993-6: Crane supporting structures

Eurocode 3 applies to the design of buildings and civil engineering works in steel. It complies with the principles and requirements for the safety and serviceability of structures, the basis of their design and verification that are given in EN 1990 – Basis of structural design. It is only concerned with requirements for resistance, serviceability, durability and fire resistance.

Eurocode 3 is intended to be used in conjunction with:

- EN 1990: Eurocode - Basis of structural design;
- EN 1991: Eurocode 1 - Actions on structures;
- ENs, ETAGs and ETAs for construction products relevant for steel structures;
- EN 1090 Execution of steel structures – Technical requirements;
- EN 1992 to EN 1999 when steel structures or steel components are referred to.

== Part 1-1: General rules and rules for buildings ==
EN 1993-1-1 gives basic design rules for steel structures with material thicknesses t ≥ 3 mm. It also gives supplementary provisions for the structural design of steel buildings.

=== Contents ===
- General
- Basis of design
- Materials
- Durability
- Structural analysis
- Ultimate limit states
- Serviceability limit states

== Part 1-2: General rules - Structural fire design ==
EN 1993-1-2 deals with the design of steel structures for the accidental situation of fire exposure and it has to be used in conjunction with EN 1993-1-1 and EN 1991-1-2. This part only identifies differences from, or supplements to, normal temperature design. EN 1993-1-2 deals only with passive methods of fire protection.

== Part 1-3: General rules - Supplementary rules for cold-formed members and sheeting ==
EN 1993-1-3 gives design requirements for cold-formed thin gauge members and sheeting. It applies to cold-formed steel products made from coated or uncoated thin gauge hot or cold rolled sheet or strip, that have been cold-formed by such processes as cold-rolled forming or press-braking. It may also be used for the design of profiled steel sheeting for composite steel and concrete slabs at the construction stage, see EN 1994. The execution of steel structures made of cold-formed thin gauge members and sheeting is covered in EN 1090.

== Part 1-4: General rules - Supplementary rules for stainless steels ==
EN 1993-1-4 deals with the additional requirements for the design of steel structures made of stainless steel and it has to be used in conjunction with EN 1993-1-1 and EN 1993-1-3.

== Part 1-5: Plated structural elements ==
EN 1993-1-5 gives design requirements of stiffened and unstiffened plates which are subject to inplane forces.

== Part 1-6: Strength and Stability of Shell Structures ==
EN 1993-1-6 gives design requirements for plated steel structures that have the form of a shell of revolution.

== Part 1-7: General Rules - Supplementary rules for planar plated structural elements with out of plane loading ==
EN 1993-1-7: provides principles and rules of application for the structural design of stiffened and unstiffened plates loaded with out of plane actions and it has to be used in conjunction with EN 1993-1-1.

== Part 1-8: Design of joints ==
EN 1993-1-8 gives design methods for the design of joints subject to predominantly static loading using steel grades S235, S275, S355 and S460. More specifically, it gives detailed application rules to determine the static design resistances of uniplanar and multiplanar joints in lattice structures composed of circular, square or rectangular hollow sections, and of uniplanar joints in lattice structures composed of combinations of hollow sections with open sections (space frames and trusses).

== Part 1-9: Fatigue ==
EN 1993-1-9 gives methods for the assessment of fatigue resistance of members, connections and joints subjected to fatigue loading. These methods are derived from fatigue tests with large scale specimens, that include effects of geometrical and structural imperfections from material production and execution (e.g. the effects of tolerances and residual stresses from welding).

== Part 1-10: Material Toughness and through-thickness properties ==
EN 1993-1-10 provides the guidelines for the selection of steel for fracture toughness and through-thickness properties of welded elements where there is a significant risk of lamellar tearing during the fabrication process.

== Part 1-11: Design of Structures with tension components ==
EN 1993-1-11 gives design rules for structures with tension components made of steel which due to their connections are adjustable and replaceable. These components due to their adjustability and replaceability properties are mostly pre-fabricated delivered on-site and installed into the structure as a whole. Non adjustable and replaceable components are out of the scope of EN 1993-1-11.

== Part 1-12: High Strength steels ==
EN 1993-1-12 gives rules that can be used in conjunction with all the other part of EN 1993 to enable steel structures to be designed with steel of grades greater than S460 up to S700.

== Part 2: Steel Bridges ==
EN 1993-2 gives a general basis for the structural design of steel bridges and steel parts of composite bridges. It gives provisions that supplement, modify or supersede the equivalent provisions given in the various parts of EN 1993-1. This standard is concerned only with the resistance, serviceability and durability of bridge structures. Other aspects of design are not considered.

== Part 3-1: Towers, masts and chimneys ==
EN 1993-3-1 applies to the structural design of vertical steel towers, masts and chimneys, and is concerned only with their resistance, serviceability and durability.

== Part 3-2: Towers, masts and chimneys - Chimneys ==
EN 1993-3-2 applies to the structural design of vertical steel chimneys of circular or conical section. It covers chimneys that are cantilevered, supported at intermediate levels or guyed. It is concerned only with the requirement for resistance (strength, stability and fatigue) of steel chimneys. The term Chimney is used to refer to:

- chimney structures,
- steel cylindrical elements of towers,
- steel cylindrical shafts of guyed masts.

== Part 4-1: Silos ==
EN 1993-4-1 provides principles and application rules for the structural design of steel silos of circular or rectangular plan-form, being free standing or supported and is concerned only with the requirements for resistance and stability of steel silos.

== Part 4-2: Tanks ==
EN 1993-4-2 provides principles and application rules for the structural design of vertical cylindrical above ground steel storage tanks for liquid products with the following characteristics:

- characteristic internal pressures above the liquid level not less than −100 mbar and not more than 500 mbar, i.e. outside the scope of the Pressure Equipment Directive,
- design metal temperature in the range of −50 °C to +300 °C,
- maximum design liquid level not higher than the top of the cylindrical shell.

== Part 4-3: Pipelines ==
EN 1993-4-3 deals with the analysis and design of steel pipelines used for the transport of liquids and gases under normal temperatures.

== Part 5: Piling ==
EN 1993-5 gives design rules for steel sheet piling and bearing piles to supplement the generic rules in EN 1993-1 and is intended to be used with Eurocodes EN 1990 - Basis of design, EN 1991 - Actions on structures and EN 1997-1 for Geotechnical Design.

== Part 6: Crane supporting structures ==
EN 1993-6 gives principles and application rules for the structural design of crane runaway beams and other crane supporting structures including columns and other member fabricated from steel. This part is intended to be used with Eurocode EN 1991-1 and it covers overhead crane runaways inside buildings and outdoor overhead crane runaways.
