= Eurocode 5: Design of timber structures =

Logo of Eurocode 5

In the Eurocode series of European standards (EN) related to construction, Eurocode 5: Design of timber structures (abbreviated EN 1995 or, informally, EC 5) describes how to design buildings and civil engineering works in timber, using the limit state design philosophy. It was approved by the European Committee for Standardization (CEN) on 16 April 2004. It applies for civil engineering works from solid timber, sawn, planed or in pole form, glued laminated timber or wood-based structural products, (e.g. LVL) or wood-based panels jointed together with adhesives or mechanical fasteners and is divided into the following parts.

EN Eurocode 5 is intended to be used in conjunction with:

- EN 1990: Eurocode - Basis of structural design;
- EN 1991: Eurocode 1 - Actions on structures;
- hENs, ETAGs and ETAs: for construction products relevant to timber structures;
- EN 1998: Eurocode 8 - Design of structures for earthquake resistance, when timber structures are built in seismic regions.

== Part 1-1: General — Common rules and rules for buildings ==
EN 1995-1-1 gives general design rules for timber structures together with specific design rules for buildings.

== Contents ==
- General
- Basis of design
- Materials
- Durability
- Basis of Structural analysis
- Ultimate limit states
- Serviceability limit states
- Connections with metal fasteners
- Components and assemblies
- Structural detailing and control.

=== Part 1-2: General - Structural fire design ===
EN 1995-1-2 deals with the design of timber structures for the accidental situation of fire exposure and is intended to be used in conjunction with EN 1995-1-1 and EN 1991-1-2:2002. EN 1995-1-2 only identifies differences from, or supplements normal temperature design and deals only with passive methods of fire protection. Active methods are not covered.

=== Part 2: Bridges ===
EN 1995-2 gives general design rules for the structural parts of bridges, i.e. structural members of importance for the reliability of the whole bridge or major parts of it, made of timber or other wood-based materials, either singly or compositely with concrete, steel or other materials.
