= Howard Taylor (engineer) =

British structural engineer

- Born: April 1940; Manchester, England
- Died: 7 November 2016
- Education: Frome Grammar School, University of Manchester Institute of Science and Technology
- Engineering career
- Discipline: Structural engineer
- Institutions: Institution of Structural Engineers
- Practice name: Dow Mac Concrete Ltd (became Costain Building Products Ltd dissolved 2018).

Howard Peter John Taylor (1940 – 2016) was a British structural engineer. He was born in 1940 near Manchester and died in 2016.

== Early life and education ==
Taylor was the son of a mastic roof contractor. The family moved to Somerset where he attended Frome Grammar School. He read Civil Engineering at UMIST (University of Manchester Institute of Science and Technology) and graduated in 1961.

== Career ==
Taylor joined Sir Alexander Gibb & Partners (Jacobs Engineering Group since 2001) after graduation, working in the design office before being moved to site supervising the piling works at Tilbury B Power Station and the West Thurrock Power Station where he became senior engineer. In 1964 he joined the Cement & Concrete Association (Mineral Products Association since 2009) as a research engineer. He was awarded an external PhD at City University in 1971. He was appointed the Cement & Concrete Association's technical manager of the 'Concrete in the Oceans' programme but moved in 1978 to be chief engineer of Dow Mac Concrete Ltd, becoming a director in 1986. When the company was taken over by Costain Building Products Ltd he was appointed a director of the concrete division of the new company. Taylor was a member of BS 5400 and BS 8110 committees and the Eurocode 2: Design of concrete structures Committee. He was a member of the Editorial Advisory Board of the Magazine of Concrete Research and a Royal Academy of Engineering Visiting Professor at the University of Nottingham. Taylor was President of the Institution of Structural Engineers in 1993-4.

== Awards and honours ==
- Oscar Faber Bronze Medal 1971 of the Institution of Structural Engineers
- Royal Academy of Engineering Visiting Professor University of Nottingham

== Selected publications ==
- The Precast Concrete Bridge Beam: the First 50 Years
- The influence of reinforcement detailing on the strength of concrete structures
