= Robustness (disambiguation) =

Robustness is the property of being strong and healthy in constitution.

Robustness may also refer to:

- Robustness (computer science), the ability of a computer system to cope with errors during execution
- Robustness (economics), the ability of a financial trading system to remain effective under different markets
- Robustness (evolution), the persistence of a certain characteristic in a system under perturbations or conditions of uncertainty
- Structural robustness, the strength of a structure to withstand adverse events
- Robust control, an approach to controller design that explicitly deals with uncertainty
- Robust decision-making, an iterative decision analytics framework
- Robust optimization, a field of mathematical optimization theory
- Robust statistics, which maintain their properties even if the underlying distributional assumptions are incorrect
- Robustness (morphology), the opposite of gracility

== See also ==
- Fault tolerance
