= Eurocode: Basis of structural design =

Logo of Eurocode 0

In the Eurocode series of European standards (EN) related to construction, Eurocode: Basis of structural design (informally Eurocode 0; abbreviated EN 1990 or, informally, EC 0) establishes the basis for using the Eurocodes for structural design. Eurocode 0 establishes Principles and requirements for the safety, serviceability and durability of structures, describes the basis for their design and verification and gives guidelines for related aspects of structural reliability. Eurocode 0 is intended to be used in conjunction with EN 1991 to EN 1999 for the structural design of buildings and civil engineering works, including geotechnical aspects, structural fire design, situations involving earthquakes, execution and temporary structures.

Eurocode 0 is also applicable:

- for the design of structures where other materials or other actions outside the scope of EN 1991 to EN 1999 are involved,
- for the structural appraisal of existing construction, in developing the design of repairs and alterations or in assessing change of use.

Eurocode 0 may be used, when relevant, as a guidance document for the design of structures outside the scope of the EN Eurocodes EN 1991 to EN 1999, for:

- assessing other actions and their combinations;
- modelling material and structural behaviour;
- assessing numerical values of the reliability format.

Annex A2 of EN 1990 gives rules and methods for establishing combinations of actions for serviceability and ultimate limit state verifications (except fatigue verifications) with the recommended design values of permanent, variable and accidental actions and ψ factors to be used in the design of road bridges, footbridges and railway bridges. It also applies to actions during execution. Methods and rules for verifications relating to some material-independent serviceability limit states are also given.

The current latest version of the British Standard is EN 1990:2002+A1:2005, incorporating corrigendum December 2008. It supersedes DD ENV 1991-1:1996 which is withdrawn.

== Normative References ==
The Eurocodes were published as European Prestandards. The following European Standards which are published or in preparation are cited in normative clauses:

1. EN 1991 Eurocode 1 : Actions on structures
2. EN 1992 Eurocode 2 : Design of concrete structures
3. EN 1993 Eurocode 3 : Design of steel structures
4. EN 1994 Eurocode 4 : Design of composite steel and concrete structures
5. EN 1995 Eurocode 5 : Design of timber structures
6. EN 1996 Eurocode 6 : Design of masonry structures
7. EN 1997 Eurocode 7 : Geotechnical design
8. EN 1998 Eurocode 8 : Design of structures for earthquake resistance
9. EN 1999 Eurocode 9 : Design of aluminium structures

== See also ==
- Building code
- First-order reliability method
