= The Steel Network, Inc. =

- Company type: Private
- Industry: Cold-formed steel Manufacturing
- Founded: Wilmington, Delaware (1998)
- Headquarters: Durham, North Carolina, USA
- Key people: Edward di Girolamo, President & CEO
- Products: VertiClip; DriftClip; JamStud; SigmaStud
- Number of employees: ~100 (2021).
- Website: https://steelnetwork.com/

The Steel Network, Inc, aka TSN is a United States–based company headquartered in Durham, North Carolina, that manufactures light steel framing (cold-formed steel) building components for commercial and residential construction. TSN is the parent company of Applied Science International.

== History ==
Formed in 1998, The Steel Network was the original developer of Applied Science International's SteelSmart System software. TSN transitioned into manufacturing soon after with the development of the first cold-formed steel connectors for Vertical deflection conditions in commercial light steel framing. Since then, TSN has created cold-formed steel solutions for mechanical bridging, non-loadbearing wall, moment resisting walls, deep leg track, built-up posts, strap bracing shear walls, mid-rise construction, continuous rigid insulation, seismic and blast design, and progressive collapse

== TSN ==
TSN transitioned into manufacturing soon after with the development of the first cold-formed steel connectors for Vertical deflection conditions in commercial light steel framing. Since then, the firm has created cold-formed steel solutions for mechanical bridging, non-loadbearing wall, moment resisting walls, deep leg track, built-up posts, strap bracing shear walls, mid-rise construction, continuous rigid insulation, seismic and blast design, and progressive collapse

== ASI ==
Applied Science International, LLC, aka ASI provides advanced engineering design and analysis software and services to the DHS, United States Department of Defense, engineering firms, demolition contractors, and universities. ASI was founded in 2003 to create structural analysis software tools utilizing the Applied Element Method (AEM) .

=== Services ===
ASI provides services including structural vulnerability assessment, forensic engineering analysis, progressive collapse analysis, blast analysis, demolition analysis, seismic analysis, impact analysis, glass performance analysis, performance based design, and product development.

=== Products ===
- Extreme Loading for Structures: ELS is a software program that utilizes the Applied Element Method (AEM), a non-linear based solver that assists structural engineers in the study of the behavior of structures in 3D, throughout all stages of loading including static loads and dynamic loads such as those generated by blasts, seismic events, impacts and wind loads. The first release of Extreme Loading for Structures (ELS) was a 2D engineering analysis program allowing structural engineers to perform computer simulations for structural analysis purposes. Since then ASI has released v2.0 and v3.0, which allows users 3D modeling and simulating of the behavior of structures through all three stages of loading: small displacement, large displacement, and collision/collapse.
- SLAM FX: SLAM FX is a software tool that assists visual effects professionals in the creation of destruction effects which can then be imported into animation software such as Autodesk Maya and 3d max for film and television.
- Steel Smart System (SSS): SSS is a software tool that aids architects, engineers and contractors in the design and optimization of structures built from light gauge steel.
- Steel Smart Decks (SSD): SSD is a software tool developed to automate the process of deck system design using cold formed steel.

=== Notable ASI projects ===
- Alfred P. Murrah Federal Building: ASI executed a study of the Alfred P. Murrah Federal Building utilizing the Applied Element Method and showing real-time analysis of the building performance as the blast occurred.
- I-35 Bridge Collapse: The firm provided forensic engineering analysis to identify the cause of the collapse of the I-35W Mississippi River Bridge.
- Charlotte Coliseum: ASI provided the demolition contractor, a predictive simulation of the building implosion of the Charlotte Coliseum prior to the actual demolition.
