= BS 5950 =

Withdrawn British Standard for design, fabrication and erection of structure

BS 5950 is a withdrawn British Standard for the design, fabrication and erection of structural steelwork. It was written for use in the UK but can be used worldwide. It was superseded by BS EN 1993 and withdrawn on 30 March 2010.

It does not apply to bridges, which are covered by BS 5400. BS 5950 replaced BS 449, which used a permissible stress approach, and uses limit state design methods.
