= Robustness =

Ability of a system to resist change without adapting its initial stable configuration

Robustness is the property of being strong and healthy in constitution. When it is transposed into a system, it refers to the ability of tolerating perturbations that might affect the system's functional body. In the same line robustness can be defined as "the ability of a system to resist change without adapting its initial stable configuration". If the probability distributions of uncertain parameters are known, the probability of instability can be estimated, leading to the concept of stochastic robustness.

"Robustness in the small" refers to situations wherein perturbations are small in magnitude, which considers that the "small" magnitude hypothesis can be difficult to verify because "small" or "large" depends on the specific problem. Conversely, "Robustness in the large problem" refers to situations wherein no assumptions can be made about the magnitude of perturbations, which can either be small or large. It has been discussed that robustness has two dimensions: resistance and avoidance.

== Robustness of complex networks ==
Robustness, the ability to withstand failures and perturbations, is a critical attribute of many complex systems including complex networks.

The study of robustness in complex networks is important for many fields. In ecology, robustness is an important attribute of ecosystems, and can give insight into the reaction to disturbances such as the extinction of species. For biologists, network robustness can help the study of diseases and mutations, and how to recover from some mutations. In economics, network robustness principles can help understanding of the stability and risks of banking systems. And in engineering, network robustness can help to evaluate the resilience of infrastructure networks such as the Internet or power grids.

== Structural robustness ==
Robustness is the ability of a structure to withstand events like fire, explosions, impact or the consequences of human error, without being damaged to an extent disproportionate to the original cause – as defined in EN 1991-1-7 of the Accidental Actions Eurocode.

A structure designed and constructed to be robust should not suffer from disproportionate collapse (progressive collapse) under accidental loading. Buildings of some kinds, especially large-panel systems and precast concrete buildings, are disproportionately more susceptible to collapse; others, such as in situ cast concrete structures, are disproportionately less susceptible. The method employed in making a structure robust will typically depend on and be tailored to the kind of structure it is, as in steel framed building structural robustness is typically achieved through appropriately designing the system of connections between the frame's constituents.

== Robustness of biological systems ==
In evolutionary biology, robustness of a biological system (also called biological or genetic robustness) is the persistence of a certain characteristic or trait in a system under perturbations or conditions of uncertainty. Robustness in development is known as canalization. According to the kind of perturbation involved, robustness can be classified as mutational, environmental, recombinational, or behavioral robustness etc. Robustness is achieved through the combination of many genetic and molecular mechanisms and can evolve by either direct or indirect selection. Several model systems have been developed to experimentally study robustness and its evolutionary consequences.

A network of genotypes linked by mutations. Each genotype is made up of 3 genes: a, b & c. Each gene can be one of two alleles. Lines link different phenotypes by mutation. The phenotype is indicated by colour. Genotypes abc, Abc, aBc and abC lie on a neutral network since all have the same, dark phenotype. Genotype abc is robust since any single mutation retains the same phenotype. Other genotypes are less robust as mutations change the phenotype (e.g. ABc).

== Robustness of computer systems ==
In computer science, robustness is the ability of a computer system to cope with errors during execution and cope with erroneous input. Robustness can encompass many areas of computer science, such as robust programming, robust machine learning, and Robust Security Network. Formal techniques, such as fuzz testing, are essential to showing robustness since this type of testing involves invalid or unexpected inputs. Alternatively, deliberate fault injection can be used to test robustness. Various commercial products perform robustness testing of software analysis.

== Robustness of financial trading systems ==
In economics, robustness is the ability of a financial trading system to remain effective under different markets and different market conditions, or the ability of an economic model to remain valid under different assumptions, parameters and initial conditions.

== See also ==
- Fault-tolerant system
- Resilience (disambiguation)
- Robustness principle
