= Eurocode 9: Design of aluminium structures =

Logo of Eurocode 9

In the Eurocode series of European standards (EN) related to construction, Eurocode 9: Design of aluminium structures (abbreviated EN 1999 or, informally, EC 9) describes how to design aluminium alloy structures. It complies with the principles and requirements for the safety and serviceability of structures, the basis of their design and verification that are given in EN 1990 – Basis of structural design. It sets requirements for structural integrity, including strength, serviceability, durability and fire resistance.

EN 1999 is intended to be used in conjunction with:

- EN 1990: Eurocode – Basis of structural design;
- EN 1991: Eurocode 1 – Actions on structures;
- European Standards for construction products relevant for aluminium structures;
- EN 1090-1 : Execution of steel structures and aluminium structures – Part 1 : General technical delivery conditions for structural steel and aluminium components;
- EN 1090-3 : Execution of steel structures and aluminium structures – Part 3 : Technical requirements for aluminium structures.

Eurocode 9 has five parts:

- EN 1999-1-1: General structural rules
- EN 1999-1-2: Structural fire design
- EN 1999-1-3: Structures susceptible to fatigue
- EN 1999-1-4: Cold-formed structural sheeting
- EN 1999-1-5: Shell structures
