= Design load =

Engineering term

In general, the term design load can refer to two distinct concepts:

1. the maximum amount a system is designed to handle, or
2. the maximum amount the system is capable of producing.

These interpretations represent fundamentally different aspects of system performance. The design load is either the same as or a multiple of the rated load, which represents the system's declared performance capacity, see structural design load section below.

Structures and pressure vessels have design loads of the first type. Electric motors, compressors and heaters have design loads of the second type. Cranes have design loads of both the first and second type because they have to lift a defined load and do that at a specified speed.

== Example crane design load ==
A crane's rated load is its Safe Working Load (SWL) and the design load (DL) is, (p 90)
$$DL=\psi SWL$$
The dynamic lift factor for offshore cranes in the range 10 kN < SWL ≤ 2500 kN is not less than $\psi = 1.3$.(p 84) Thus for a crane with a SWL of 2000 kN (~200 tonne) its design load is not less than,
$$DL = 1.3\times2000 = 2600 kN$$
The minimum breaking load (MBL) for the combined capacity of reeves of a steel wire hoisting rope required on this size of crane is, (p 68)
$$MBL = 2.3 DL=2.3\times 2600 = 5980 kN$$
Thus the MBL is 2.3 times of the DL and ~3 times that of the SWL for this example. Similar ratios are obtained for other parts of the crane's structure. This factor of safety has been shown to be required when a failure could be catastrophic, such as a crane dropping its load or collapsing entirely. The dynamic lift factor increases as the SWL of a crane decreases and its exact value is dependent on the hoisting speed of the crane and other factors. These calculations are more complex and beyond the scope of this article.

== Structural design load ==
In structural design, the design load depends on the calculation method used. There are two widely accepted methods, Allowable Strength Design (ASD) and Load Resistance Factor Design (LRFD). In general terms, the engineer uses unfactored structural loads and the material yield strength with a safety factor in ASD; while in LRFD both structural loads and strength are factored and the strength is the ultimate rather than the yield. For example, a bridge would have a specified load carrying capacity, with the design load being determined according to the calculation method used and applied in the calculations to ensure the actual real-world capacity of the bridge to carry specified load.

== See also ==
- Limit states design
- Factor of safety
- Specified load
