= Structural robustness =

Ability of a structure to withstand physical strain

Robustness is the ability of a structure to withstand events like fire, explosions, impact or the consequences of human error, without being damaged to an extent disproportionate to the original cause – . As defined in EN 1991-1-7 of the Accidental Actions Eurocode.

A structure designed and constructed to be robust should not suffer from disproportionate collapse (progressive collapse) under accidental loading. Buildings of some kinds, especially large-panel systems and precast concrete buildings, are disproportionately more susceptible to collapse; others, such as in situ cast concrete structures, are disproportionately less susceptible. The method employed in making a structure robust will typically depend on and be tailored to the kind of structure it is, as in steel framed building structural robustness is typically achieved through appropriately designing the system of connections between the frame's constituents.

== Design considerations ==
Three alternative measures are used, sometimes jointly, to achieve structural robustness and reduce the risk of disproportionate collapse. These are:

- Reducing the possibility of occurrence of accidental loading.
- Preventing the propagation of a possible initial failure and increasing redundancy. Which includes the indirect method and the alternative load path method.
- Designing the structure to withstand accidental loading. Sometimes referred to as specific load resistance method.

== Robustness requirements in Eurocodes ==
The requirements for structures in consequence classes 2 and 3 can be found in EN 1991-1-7 Eurocode 1 - Actions on structures - Part 1-7: General actions - Accidental actions. Additional requirements and requirements for structures in consequence class 1 can be found in the material specific Eurocode parts, EN 1992 for concrete structures, EN 1993 for steel structures and so on.

In EN 1991-1-7 buildings are categorised in consequences classes, considering the building type, occupancy and size.

Consequence class 1, low consequences of failure:

- Single occupancy houses not exceeding 4 storeys.
- Agricultural buildings.
- Buildings into which people rarely go, provided no part of the building is closer to another building, or area where people do go, than a distance of 1.5 times the building height.

Consequence class 2a, lower risk group - medium consequences of failure:

- 5 storey single occupancy houses.
- Hotels not exceeding 4 storeys.
- Flats, apartments and other residential buildings not exceeding 4 storeys.
- Offices not exceeding 4 storeys.
- Industrial buildings not exceeding 3 storeys.
- Retail premises not exceeding 3 storeys of less than 1000 m^{2} floor area in each storey.
- Single storey educational buildings.
- All buildings not exceeding two storeys to which the public are admitted and which contain floor areas not exceeding 2000 m^{2} at each storey.

Consequence class 2b, upper risk group - medium consequences of failure:

- Hotels, flats, apartments and other residential buildings greater than 4 storeys but not exceeding 15 storeys.
- Educational buildings greater than single storey but not exceeding 15 storeys.
- Retail premises greater than 3 storeys but not exceeding 15 storeys.
- Hospitals not exceeding 3 storeys.
- Offices greater than 4 storeys but not exceeding 15 storeys.
- All buildings to which the public are admitted and which contain floor areas exceeding 2000 m^{2} but not exceeding 5000 m^{2} at each storey.
- Car parking not exceeding 6 storeys.

Consequence class 3, high consequences of failure:

- All buildings defined above as Class 2 Lower and Upper Consequences Class that exceed the limits on area and number of storeys.
- All buildings to which members of the public are admitted in significant numbers.
- Stadia accommodating more than 5000 spectators.
- Buildings containing hazardous substances and / or processes.

For buildings intended for more than one type of use, the consequences class should be that of the most onerous type.

Buildings in consequence class 1 should be designed and constructed in accordance with EN 1990 - 1999 for satisfying stability in normal use, no specific consideration (required by EN 1991-1-7) is necessary with regard to accidental actions from unidentified causes.

Buildings in consequence class 2a (in addition to what is recommended for consequence class 1) should be provided with effective horizontal ties, or effective anchorage of suspended floors to walls.

Buildings in consequence class 2b (in addition to what is recommended for consequence class 1 and 2a) should be provided with effective vertical ties in all supporting columns and walls, or alternatively the building should be checked to ensure that upon the notional removal of each supporting column and each beam supporting a column, or any nominal section of load-bearing wall (one at a time in each storey of the building) the building remains stable and the local damage does not exceed a certain limit. Where the removal of such columns and sections of walls would result in an extent of damage in excess of the agreed limit, such elements should be designed as a key element.

For buildings in consequence class 3 a systematic risk assessment of the building taking into account both foreseeable and unforeseeable hazards, is required.

== See also ==
- Extreme Loading for Structures
- List of structural failures and collapses
- Structural failure – Ability of a structure to support a designed structural load without breaking
