= CEN/TC 474 =

Technical committee for carbon capture

CEN/TC 474 (CEN Technical Committee 474) is a technical decision-making body within the CEN system working on standardization in the field of carbon capture in the European Union. Its goal is to develop standards for CO_{2} capture, transportation, utilization, storage (CCUS) and carbon accounting.

The activities of TC 474 are largely based on the work done internationally by ISO/TC 265 (Carbon dioxide capture, transportation, and storage), and the aim of the European TC is to build on the existing ISO standards by working on European needs on this field.

== Working groups ==
- WG1: CO_{2} streams and quality
- WG2: Pipeline transportation
- WG3: CO_{2} accounting
- WG4: Geological storage
