= BS 5400 =

BS 5400 was a British Standard code of practice for the design and construction of steel, concrete and composite bridges. It was applicable to highway, railway and pedestrian bridges. It has now been replaced by the Structural Eurocodes for the design of steel and concrete structures.

The standard specifies the requirements and the code of practice on design of steel, concrete (reinforced, prestressed or composite) and composite bridges that use steel sections (rolled or fabricated, cased or uncased) as well as the materials and workmanship in bridge erection.

The standard also includes the specification and calculation of standard bridge loads, the application of the limit state principles, analysis, and fatigue load calculation and the reservoir method for fatigue load cycle counting.

The standard also encompasses the structural design of bridge foundations as well as the design and requirements of bridge bearings for both ordinary and moving bridges.

In 2010, BS 5400 was superseded by the Structural Eurocodes for the design of new bridges. However, BS 5400 still serves as the foundation for assessment standards concerning existing highway and railway structures. Some of the prescriptive clauses from the old code have been reformulated to align with the principles of the Eurocodes and are presented as advisory material within British Standard Published Documents. These documents serve as non-contradictory complementary information (NCCI) to the Eurocodes, providing means of compliance with Eurocode requirements, often utilizing closed-form solutions familiar to engineers experienced in the application of BS5400.

== Different parts of BS 5400 ==
BS 5400 consists of ten main parts:

- BS 5400-1:1988 Steel, concrete and composite bridges. General statement.
- BS 5400-2:2006 Steel, concrete and composite bridges. Specification for loads.
- BS 5400-3:2000 Steel, concrete and composite bridges. Code of practice for design of steel bridges. (This part of standard is being partially replaced)
- BS 5400-4:1990 Steel, concrete and composite bridges. Code of practice for design of concrete bridges.
- BS 5400-5:2005 Steel, concrete and composite bridges. Code of practice for design of composite bridges
- BS 5400-6:1999 Steel, concrete and composite bridges. Specification for materials and workmanship, steel. (This part of standard is replaced by BS EN 1090-2 (EN 1090-2) but remains current)
- BS 5400-7:1978 Steel, concrete and composite bridges. Specification for materials and workmanship, concrete, reinforcement and prestressing tendons.
- BS 5400-8:1978 Steel, concrete and composite bridges. Recommendations for materials and workmanship, concrete, reinforcement and prestressing tendons.
- BS 5400-9.1:1983 Steel, concrete and composite bridges. Bridge bearings. Code of practice for design of bridge bearings. (This part of standard is partially replaced by BS EN 1337-2 (EN 1337-2), BS EN 1337-3 (EN 1337-3), BS EN 1337-5 (EN 1337-5) and BS EN 1337-7 (EN 1337-7), and replaced by BS EN 1337-4 (EN 1337-4) and BS EN 1337-6 (EN 1337-6) but remains current)
- BS 5400-9.2:1983 Steel, concrete and composite bridges. Bridge bearings. Specification for materials, manufacture and installation of bridge bearings. (This part of standard is partially replaced by BS EN 1337-2 (EN 1337-2), BS EN 1337-3 (EN 1337-3), BS EN 1337-5 (EN 1337-5) and BS EN 1337-7 (EN 1337-7))
- BS 5400-10:1980 Steel, concrete and composite bridges. Code of practice for fatigue.
- BS 5400-10C:1999 Steel, concrete and composite bridges. Charts for classification of details for fatigue.

== See also ==
- BS 8110
