= 8110 =

8110 may refer to:

- Nokia 8110, a mobile phone released in 1996
- Nokia 8110 4G, a mobile phone released in 2018
- BS 8110, British Standard for the design and construction of concrete structures
- BlackBerry Pearl 8110, a mobile phone released in 2006
- Huawei U8110, a mobile phone released in 2010
