= Bridgeport Fire Department =

Emergency medical and fire protection service provider for Bridgeport, Connecticut

Operational area
- Country: United States
- State: Connecticut
- City: Bridgeport

Agency overview
- Annual calls: 27,011 (2017)
- Employees: 291 (2015)
- Staffing: Career
- Fire chief: Mark Cody
- Fire Marshal: Joseph Carr, Jr.
- IAFF: 834

Facilities and equipment
- Battalions: 2
- Stations: 8
- Engines: 8
- Trucks: 2
- Platforms: 2
- Quints: 1
- Rescues: 1
- HAZMAT: 1
- Fireboats: 1
- Rescue boats: 6
- Light and air: 1

Website
- Official website

The Bridgeport Fire Department provides fire protection and emergency medical services to the city of Bridgeport, Connecticut.

== Department and Company History ==
=== Early history ===
Tracing its roots to 1796, the Bridgeport Fire Department protects Connecticut's largest city. Bridgeport's first step toward independence occurred when the Corporation of Newfield was formed in 1797 for the express purpose of forming a fire company. Through the years, the firefighters have continued to play a significant role in Bridgeport's history. In the mid-1800s, Bridgeport's first volunteer fire brigade hand pump was located at the foot of Wall St. near Water St., then was moved to Water St. and Union St. in 1821. In 1815, a second fire company was organized. The second company moved to Court St. near several prominent churches and became Phoenix Volunteer Fire Co. 4. In 1828, a hook and ladder company was formed. In 1834, another engine company was organized and kept in a Water St. storeroom. In 1849, the brigade was disbanded. Several new volunteer companies would soon organize in the 1850s up until the end of the Civil War. The history of the paid Bridgeport Fire Department began in 1871, when the department began shedding its "paid-on-call" firemen and replacing them with full-time paid members, a process which was completed by 1911.

=== Paid Department ===
The first paid fire companies formed in 1871 were Engine Co. 1, from D.H. Sterling Volunteer Engine Co. 1, located at John St. and Lafayette St.; Engine Co. 2, from Protector Volunteer Engine Co. 2, located at 48 Crescent Pl.; Engine Co. 5, from Pacific Volunteer Engine Company's Excelsior No. 5, located at Main St. & Golden Hill St.; Hook & Ladder Co. 4, from Rescue Volunteer Hook & Ladder Co. 1, located on Middle St.

In 1872, Engine Co. 3 was organized from Fountain Volunteer Engine Co. 3., which was relocated to Bridgeport's West Side near P.T. Barnum's winter quarters at 167 Norman St. in 1888. Engine Co. 4 was also organized in 1872 from Empire Volunteer Engine Co. 4, and relocated to a new firehouse at Madison Ave. near George St. in 1888.

In 1876, Hook & Ladder Co. 4 became Truck Co. 1 and was quartered together with Engine Co. 5 in a new firehouse at 268 Middle St., which would serve as headquarters for the fire department until 1976.

In 1885, Engine Co. 6 was organized, from Americus Hose Co. 6, located on Broad St. Engine 6's new firehouse was first at 555 Seaview Ave., then moved to 1637 Seaview Ave. near the railroad line in 1899. In 1893, Truck Co. 2 was organized at 268 Middle St. Truck Co. 1 was moved to 167 Norman St. with Engine Co. 3 on the West Side the following year.

=== Department Expansion ===
In 1900, Engine Co. 7 was organized at 575 Bostwick Ave. on the city's West Side near the Black Rock community. In 1906, Truck Co. 3 was organized at Barnum Ave. & Central Ave. on the East Side, where Engine Co. 6 would later move to in 1922. Also, in 1906, Chemical Co. 1 was organized on Middle St.

In 1907, Engine Co. 8 was organized at 556 Newfield Ave. and Engine Co. 9 was organized on Allen St. near Lafayette St. Engine Co. 11 was organized at 2656 Fairfield Ave. in Black Rock, while Engine Co. 12 was organized at 265 Beechmont Ave. The following year, Chemical Co. 2 was organized at 399 Maplewood Ave. on the city's West Side. In 1912, Chemical Co. 3 was organized at the quarters of Truck Co. 3 at Barnum Ave. & Central Ave. Engine Co. 10 was organized in 1913 at 268 Putnam St., also on the East Side. In 1917, Truck Co. 4 was established at the quarters of Engine Co. 11, while Truck Co. 5 was established at the quarters of Engine Co. 12.

In 1940, the truck companies of the Bridgeport Fire Department were renumbered to correspond with the engine company they were quartered with. Truck Co. 1 became 3, 2 became 5, 3 became 6, 4 became 11, and 5 became 12. Truck Co. 10 was also established at the quarters of Engine Co. 10. Additionally, Chemical Co. 1 was disbanded to form a specialized rescue unit known as Squad Co. 5. Several years later, another specialized unit derived from a chemical company known as Squad Co. 6 would briefly operate out of the firehouse on Barnum Ave., but would later be disbanded to form a new engine company.

Engine Co. 14 and Engine Co. 15 were established after World War II in 1948, originally quartered in a firehouse built in 1945 at 1395 Sylvan Ave. Engine Co. 15 later moved to 104 Evers St. where it remains today. Finally, in 1957, Engine Co. 16 and Truck Co. 16 were organized and placed into service at a new firehouse at 3115 Madison Ave. However, Truck Co. 16 only remained in service for a short time and came to serve as a reserve truck company for the department. Eventually, Engine Co. 9 moved to the quarters of Engine Co. 16 until it was disbanded in 1967.

During the 1950s, at its height, the Bridgeport Fire Department operated 15 Engine Companies, 6 Truck Companies, and 1 Squad Company out of 15 Firehouses, located throughout the city, serving a population of approximately 158,000.

== Fire Station Locations and Companies ==
Department headquarters on Congress Avenue

Below is a current list of all fire station and company locations in the city of Bridgeport.

Engine Company	Ladder Company	Special Unit	Battalion Chief or Car Unit	Battalion	Address	Neighborhood
Engine 1	Tower Ladder 5	Rescue 5, Safety Officer 1, Zodiac 1, Technical Rescue Vehicle And Confined Space Rescue Trailer, Command and Light unit	Battalion Chief 1, Car 1 (Chief of Department), Car 2 (Deputy Chief of Administration), Car 3 (Deputy Chief of Operations)	1	30 Congress St.	Downtown
Engine 3, Engine 4		Engine 23 (Spare), Engine 24 (Spare), Haz-Mat Decon. Trailer, Urban 3, MC 1 (high water rescue vehicle)		1	233 Wood Ave.	West Side
Engine 6	Tower Ladder 6	Zodiac 6, Engine 26 (Spare), Ladder 26 (Spare)	Battalion Chief 2	2	1035 Central Ave.	East End
Engine 7	Ladder 11	Zodiac 7 Engine 27 (Spare), Ladder 211 (Spare), Spare Rescue 5		1	245 Ocean Terrace	Black Rock
Engine 10	Ladder 10	Urban 10		2	950 Boston Ave.	East Side
Engine 12		Urban 12		1	265 Beechmont Ave.	St. Vincent area
Engine 15		Haz-Mat Spill Van		2	104 Evers St.	
Engine 16 (Quint)		Fleet Maintenance Units, Spare Engine 12 (Spare)		1	3115 Madison Ave.	

The BFD's Fireboat, Fireboat 233 is docked at the public safety dock on Ferry Access Rd. in Bridgeport Harbor. During the winter months it is stored at one of the BFD's firehouses, usually at the quarters of Engine 3 and Engine 4. In addition to the fireboat, the BFD operates three small rescue boats with tow vehicles, known as a "Zodiac" for open water, as well as 3 aluminium-hulled boats called "Urbans" for floodwaters in the streets in low lying areas of the city when it rains heavily.

Additionally, there is a fleet of spare apparatus stored at various firehouses located throughout the city, including 5 spare engines, 2 spare ladders, and 1 spare rescue.

=== Disbanded Fire Companies ===
Below is a list of BFD companies disbanded due to budget cuts or departmental reorganization.

- Engine 2 - 135 Clarence St. - Disbanded 1989 (Now BPD East Side Precinct)
- Engine 5 - 30 Congress St. (Quarters of Engine 1, Tower Ladder 5, Rescue 5) - Disbanded 2005
- Engine 8 - 1035 Central Ave. (Quarters of Engine 6, Tower Ladder 6) - Disbanded 1992
- Engine 9 - 3115 Madison Ave. (Quarters of Engine 16) - Disbanded 1967
- Engine 11 - 245 Ocean Terrace (Quarters of Engine 7, Ladder 11) - Disbanded 1976
- Engine 13 - Never Organized
- Engine 14 - 1395 Sylvan Ave. - Disbanded 1992 (Now BPD Community Services Division)
- Ladder 3 - 233 Wood Ave. (Quarters of Engine 3, Engine 4) - Disbanded 1995
- Ladder 12 - 265 Beechmont Ave. (Quarters of Engine 12) - Disbanded 1994
- Ladder 16 - 3115 Madison Ave. (Quarters of Engine 16) - Disbanded 1957
- Squad 6 - Barnum Ave. & Central Ave. (Quarters of Engine 6, Truck 6) - Disbanded 1947

== Notable Incidents ==
=== L'Ambiance Plaza Collapse ===
The Bridgeport Fire Department were notable first responders at the L'Ambiance Plaza collapse, on April 23, 1987. One of the worst disasters in Connecticut history, a 16-story residential building under construction at the corner of Washington Ave. and Coleman St., completely collapsed, killing 28 construction workers.
