= Allowable Strength Design =

Method of evaluating strength in steel production

Allowable Strength Design and Allowable Stress Design (ASD) are terms used by the American Institute of Steel Construction (AISC) in the 14th Edition of the Manual of Steel Construction.

Allowable Stress Design philosophy was left unsupported by AISC after the 9th edition of the manual which remained an acceptable reference design standard in evolving building codes (e.g. International Building Code by the International Code Council). This presented problems since new research, engineering concepts and design philosophy were ignored in the minimum requirements and references in the aging 9th edition. As a result, structures that were code compliant based on design using the Allowable Stress Design methods may not have been code compliant if reviewed with the Load and Resistance Factor Design (LRFD) requirements - particularly where the LRFD procedures explicitly defined additional analysis which was not explicitly defined in the Allowable Stress Design procedures.

AISC's Allowable Strength Design applies a quasi-safety factor approach to evaluating allowable strength. Ultimate strength of an element or member is determined in the same manner regardless of the load combination method considered (e.g. ASD or LRFD). Design load combination effects are determined in a manner appropriate to the intended form of the analysis results. ASD load combinations are compared to the ultimate strength reduced by a factor (omega) which provides a mathematical form similar to Allowable Stress Design resolved with a safety factor.

This AISC Allowable Strength Design does not attempt to relate capacity to elastic stress levels. Therefore, it is inappropriate to refer to the procedure or philosophy as either Allowable Stress or Permissible Stress Design.

== See also ==
- Permissible stress design
- Building code
