= Eurocodes =

European Union structural design standards

0: Structural safety, service-
ability and durability

1: Actions on structures

Material-specific design and detailing:

2: Concrete
4: Composite
6: Masonry

3: Steel
5: Timber
9: Aluminium

7: Geotechnics

8: Earthquake

Eurocodes (EN 199-)

Eurocodes used by CEN members (EU and EFTA members) Eurocodes used by CEN members (EU and EFTA non-members) Eurocodes used by EU non-members or states in process of adoption States with limited Eurocodes adoption

Logo of the eurocodes

The Eurocodes are the ten European standards (EN; harmonised technical rules) specifying how structural design should be conducted within the European Union (EU). These were developed by the European Committee for Standardization upon the request of the European Commission.

The purpose of the Eurocodes is to provide:

- a means to prove compliance with the requirements for mechanical strength and stability and safety in case of fire established by European Union law.
- a basis for construction and engineering contract specifications.
- a framework for creating harmonized technical specifications for building products (CE mark).

By March 2010, the Eurocodes are mandatory for the specification of European public works and are intended to become the de facto standard for the private sector. The Eurocodes therefore replace the existing national building codes published by national standard bodies (e.g. BS 5950), although many countries had a period of co-existence. Additionally, each country is expected to issue a National Annex to the Eurocodes which will need referencing for a particular country (e.g. The UK National Annex). As of 2016, take-up of Eurocodes was slow on private sector projects and existing national codes were still widely used by engineers.

The motto of the Eurocodes is "Building the future". The second generation of the Eurocodes (2G Eurocodes) is being prepared.

== History ==
In 1975, the Commission of the European Community (presently the European Commission), decided on an action programme in the field of construction, based on article 95 of the Treaty. The objective of the programme was to eliminate technical obstacles to trade and the harmonisation of technical specifications. Within this action programme, the Commission took the initiative to establish a set of harmonised technical rules for the design of construction works which, in a first would serve as an alternative to the national rules in force in the member states of the European Union (EU) and, ultimately, would replace them. For fifteen years, the Commission, with the help of a steering committee with representatives of the member states, conducted the development of the Eurocodes programme, which led to the first generation of European codes in the 1980s.

In 1989, the Commission and the member states of the EU and the European Free Trade Association (EFTA) decided, on the basis of an agreement between the Commission and to transfer the preparation and the publication of the Eurocodes to the European Committee for Standardization (CEN) through a series of mandates, in order to provide them with a future status of European Standard (EN). This links de facto the Eurocodes with the provisions of all the Council's Directives and/or Commission's Decisions dealing with European standards (e.g. Regulation (EU) No. 305/2011 on the marketing of construction products and Directive 2014/24/EU on government procurement in the European Union).

== List ==
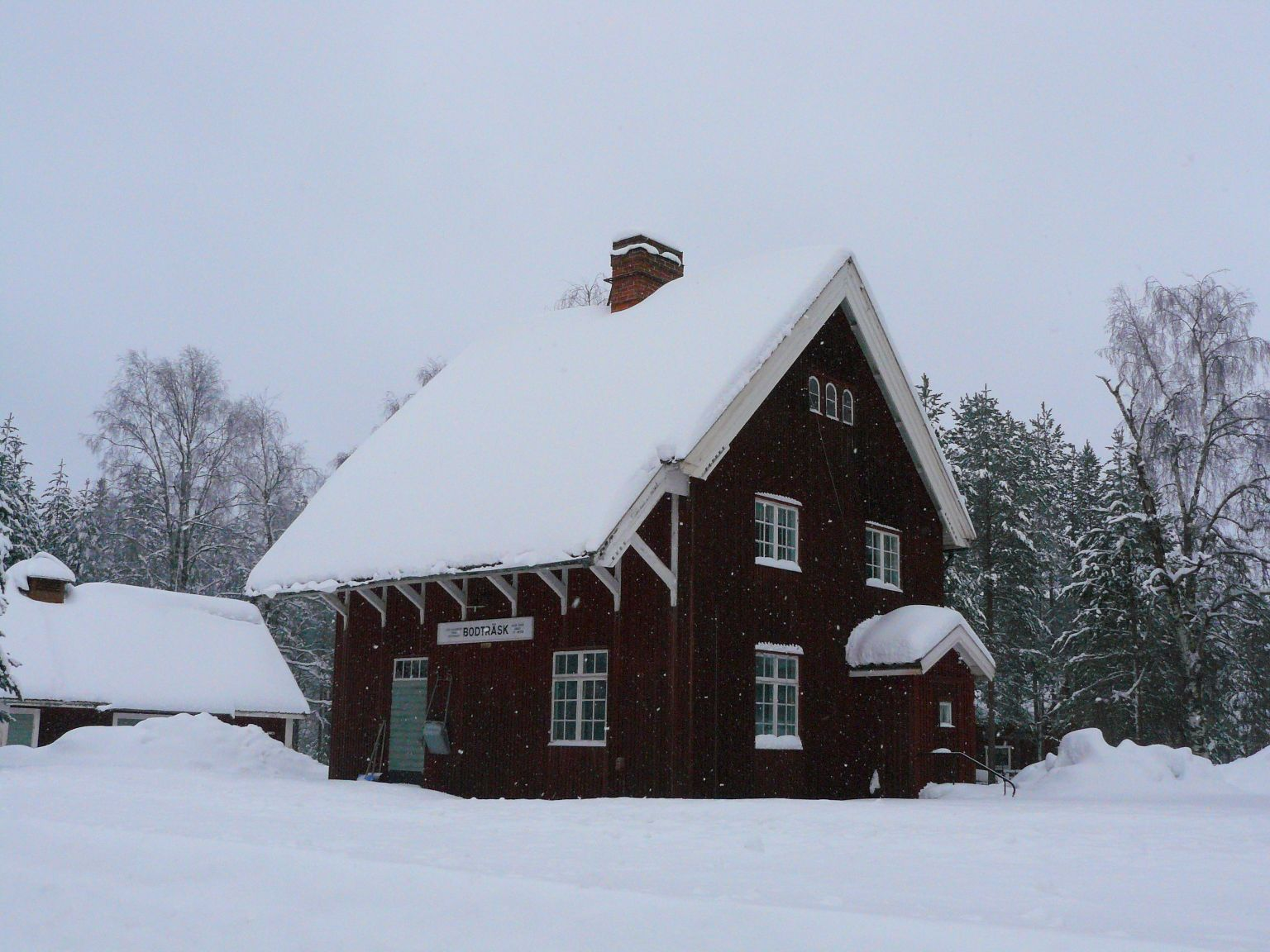
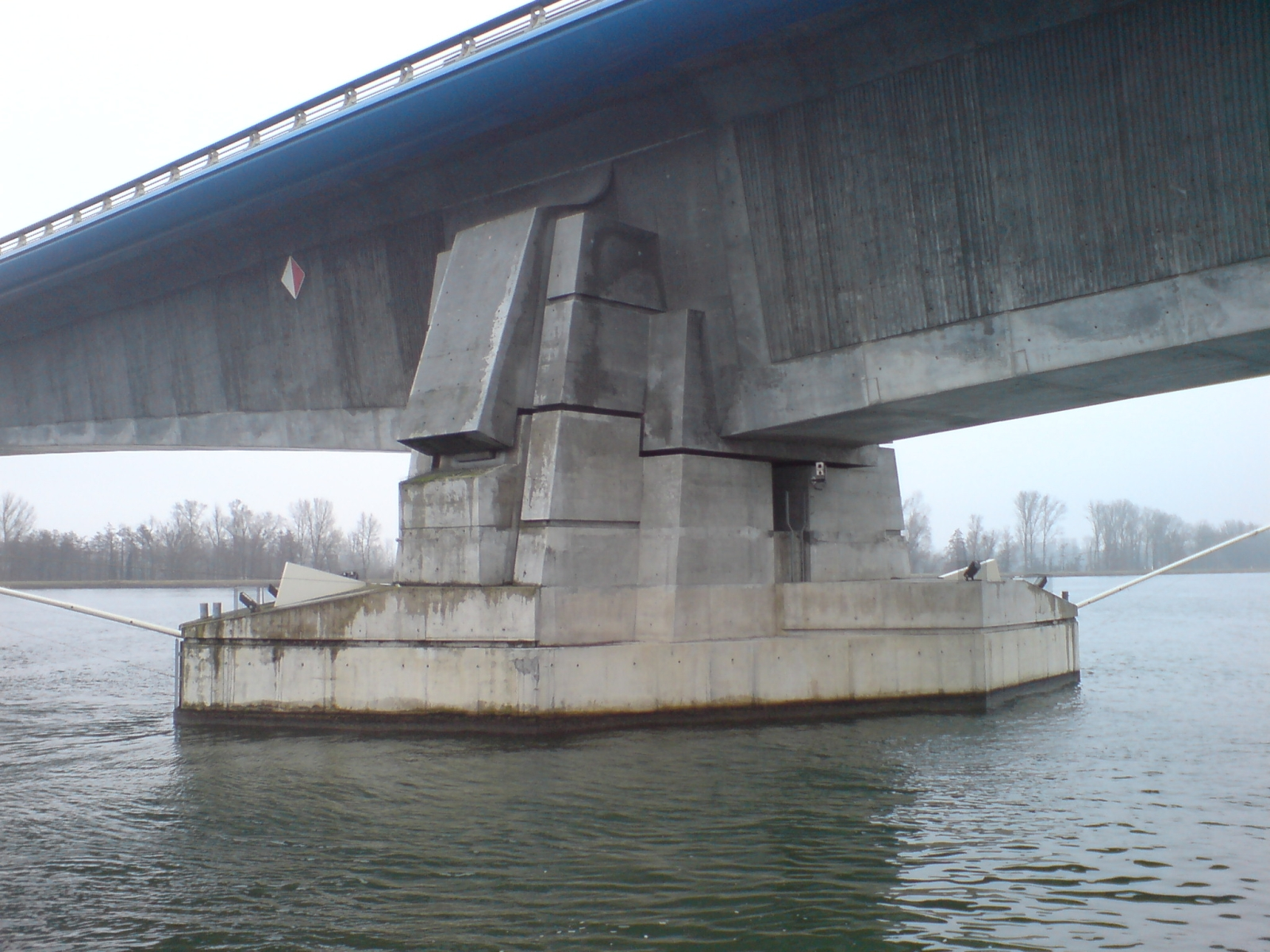
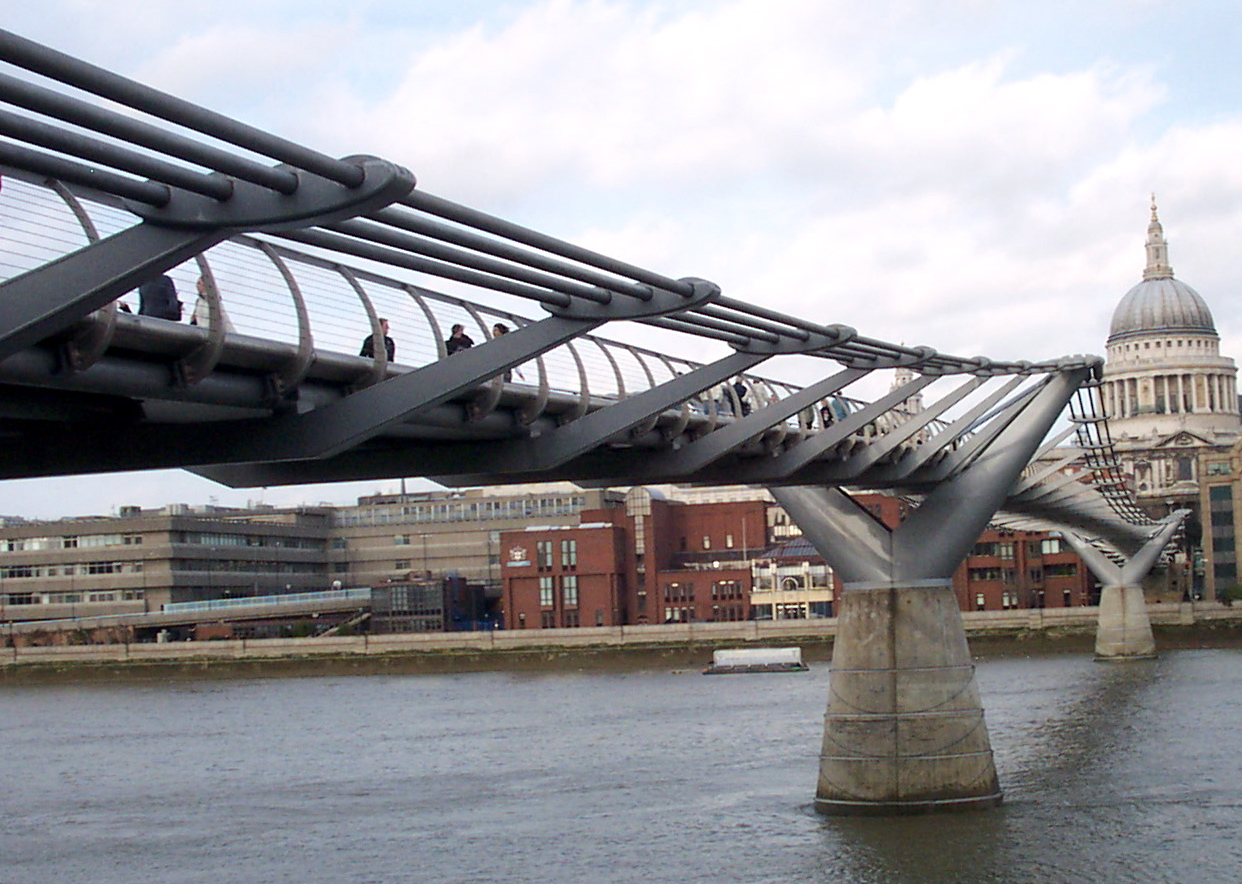
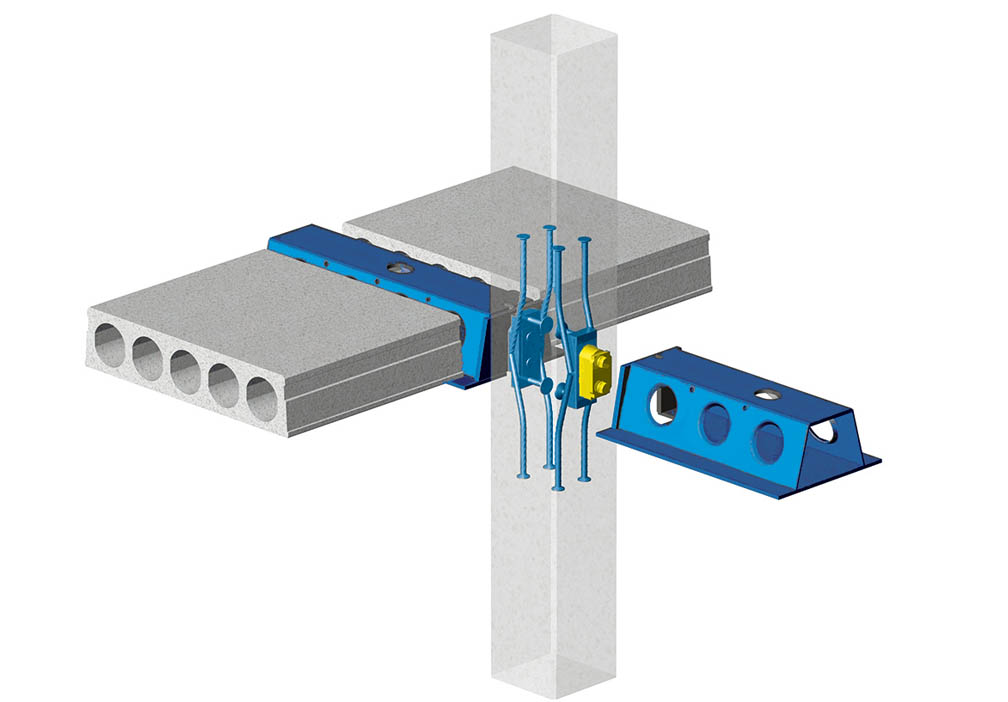
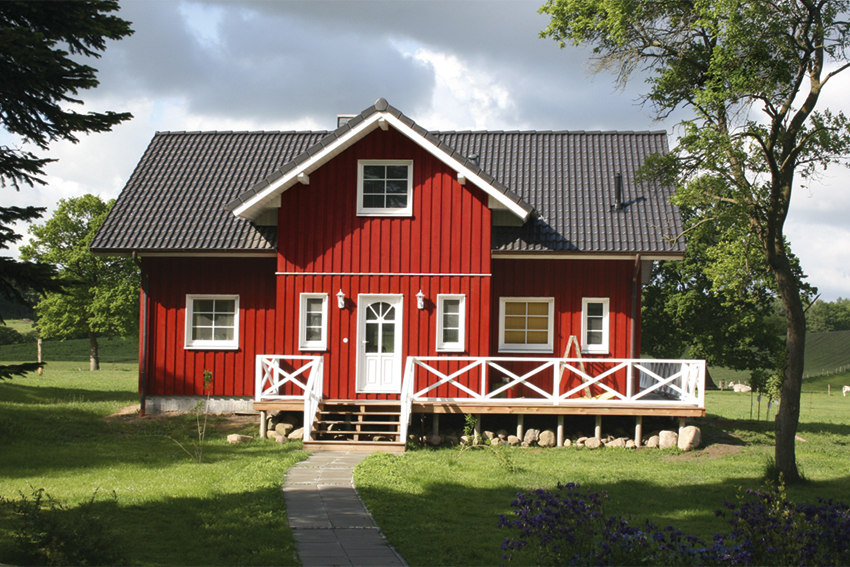
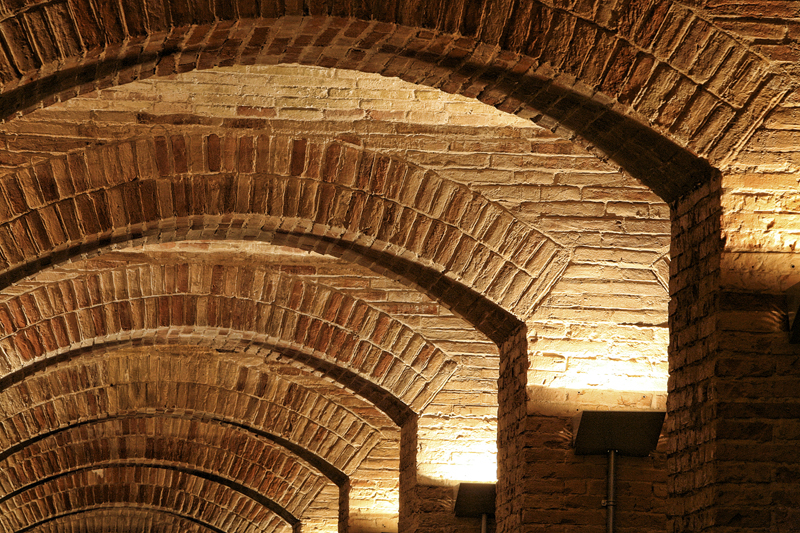
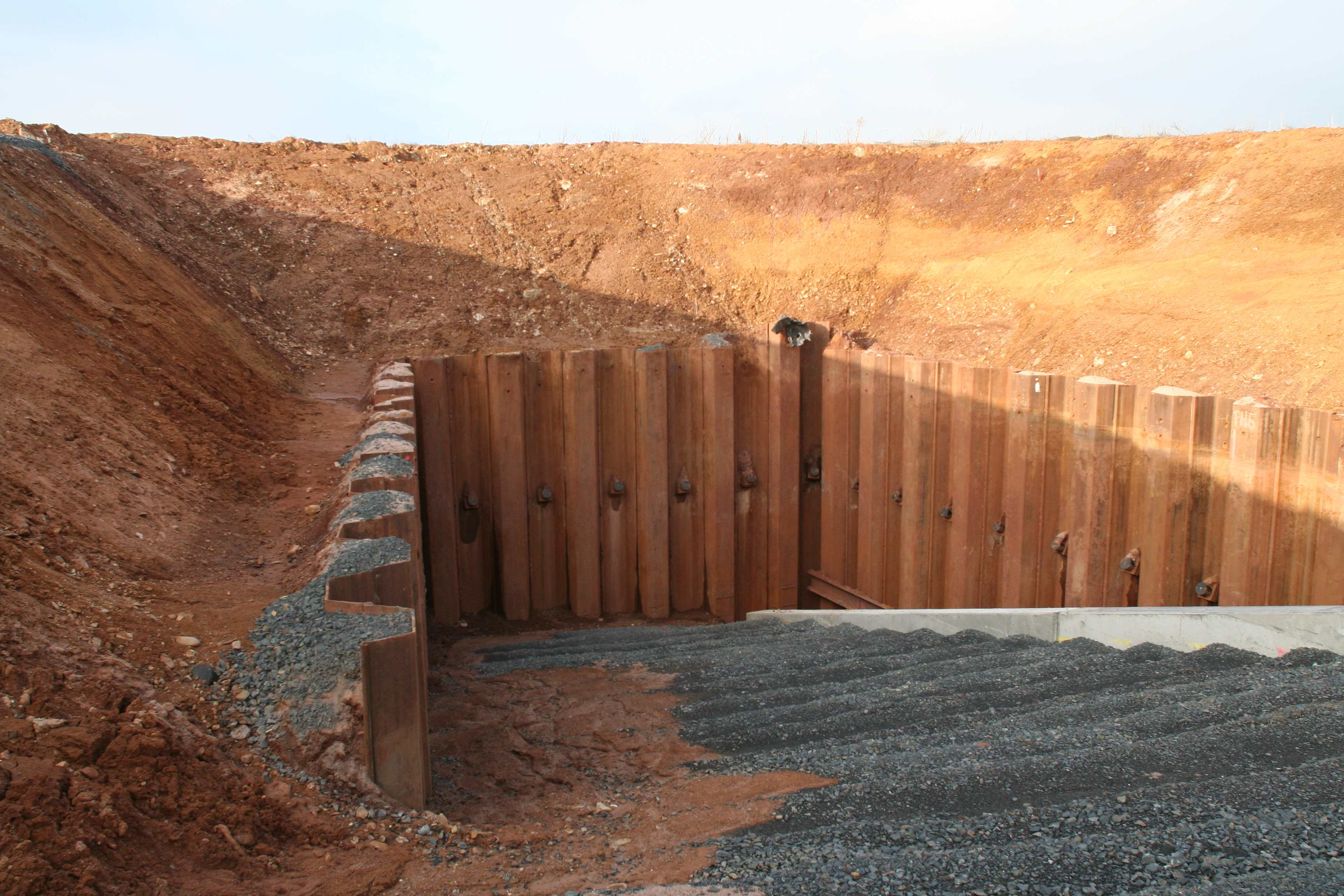
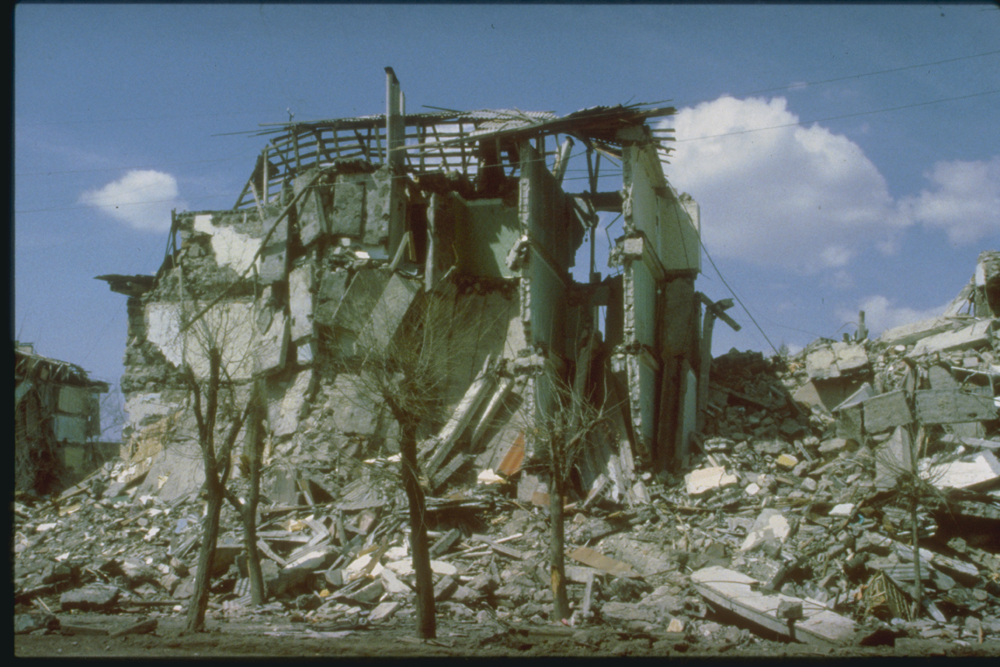
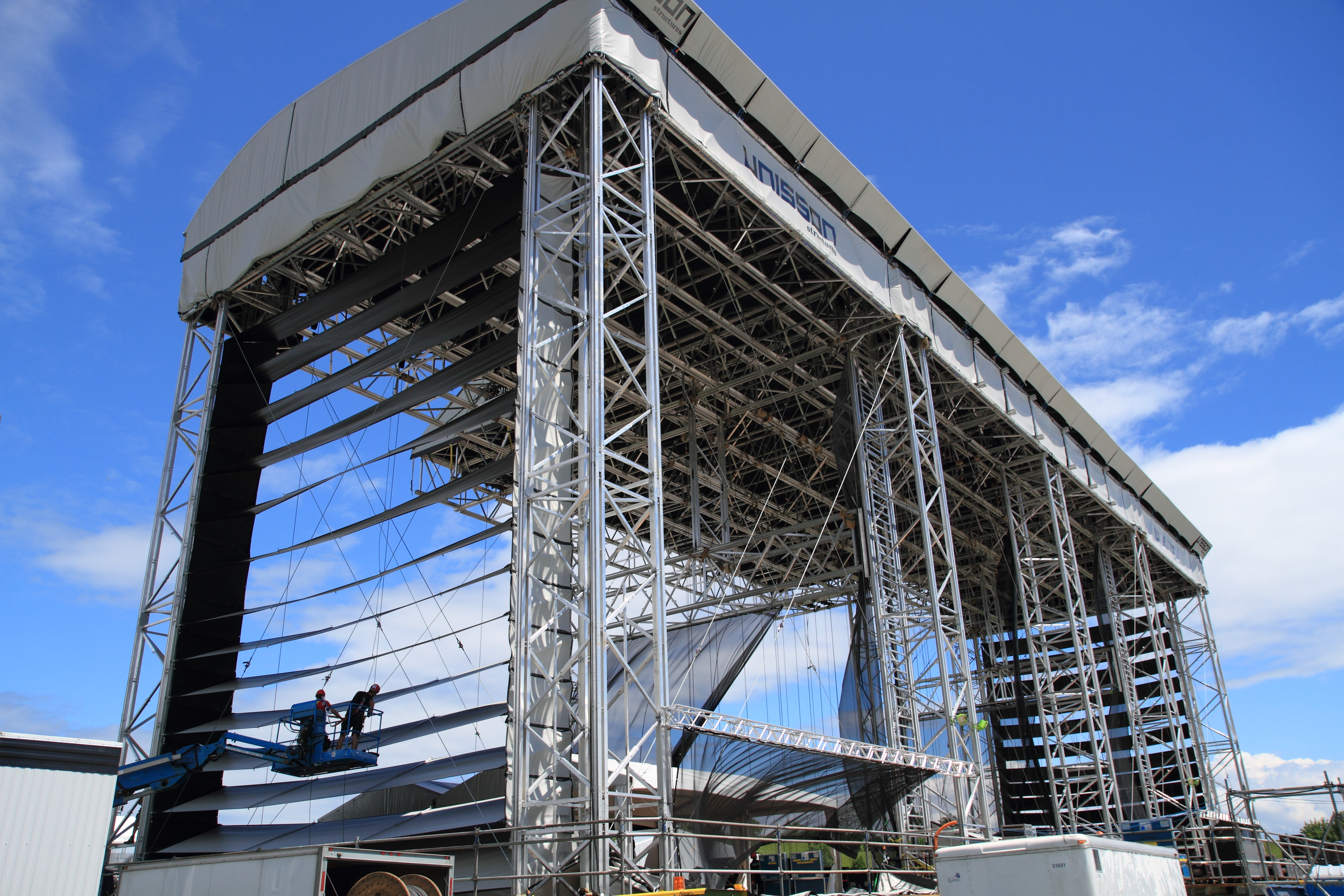
Eurocodes 1 – 9 are organised thematically, here illustrated downwards from left to right: 1: snow load, 2: concrete bridge, 3: steel bridge, 4: composite, 5: timber house, 6: masonry, 7: sheet pile wall, 8: earthquake and 9: aluminium structure.

The Eurocodes are published as a separate European Standards, each having a number of parts. By 2002, ten sections have been developed and published:

- Eurocode 0: Basis of structural design (EN 1990)

Part 1: New structures (EN 1990-1)
Part 2: Assessment of existing structures (EN 1990-2)

- Eurocode 1: Actions on structures (EN 1991)

Part 1-1: Densities, self-weight, imposed loads for buildings (EN 1991-1-1)
Part 1-2: Actions on structures exposed to fire (EN 1991-1-2)
Part 1-3: General actions - Snow loads (EN 1991-1-3)
Part 1-4: General actions - Wind actions (EN 1991-1-4)
Part 1-5: General actions - Thermal actions (EN 1991-1-5)
Part 1-6: General actions - Actions during execution (EN 1991-1-6)
Part 1-7: General actions - Accidental Actions (EN 1991-1-7)
Part 2: Traffic loads on bridges (EN 1991-2)
Part 3: Actions induced by cranes and machinery (EN 1991-3)
Part 4 : Silos and tanks (EN 1991-4)

- Eurocode 2: Design of concrete structures (EN 1992)

Part 1-1: General rules, and rules for buildings (EN 1992-1-1)
Part 1-2: Structural fire design (EN 1992-1-2)
Part 1-3: Precast Concrete Elements and Structures (EN 1992-1-3)
Part 1-4: Lightweight aggregate concrete with closed structure (EN 1992-1-4)
Part 1-5: Structures with unbonded and external prestressing tendons (EN 1992-1-5)
Part 1-6: Plain concrete structures (EN 1992-1-6)
Part 2: Reinforced and prestressed concrete bridges (EN 1992-2)
Part 3: Liquid retaining and containing structures (EN 1992-3)
Part 4: Design of fastenings for use in concrete (EN 1992-4)

- Eurocode 3: Design of steel structures (EN 1993)

Part 1-1: General rules and rules for buildings (EN 1993-1-1)
Part 1-2: General rules - Structural fire design (EN 1993-1-2)
Part 1-3: General rules - Supplementary rules for cold-formed members and sheeting (EN 1993-1-3)
Part 1-4: General rules - Supplementary rules for stainless steels (EN 1993-1-4)
Part 1-5: Plated structural elements (EN 1993-1-5)
Part 1-6: Strength and Stability of Shell Structures (EN 1993-1-6)
Part 1-7: General Rules - Supplementary rules for planar plated structural elements with out of plane loading (EN 1993-1-7)
Part 1-8: Design of joints (EN 1993-1-8)
Part 1-9: Fatigue (EN 1993-1-9)
Part 1-10: Material Toughness and through-thickness properties (EN 1993-1-10)
Part 1-11: Design of Structures with tension components (EN 1993-1-11)
Part 1-12: High Strength steels (EN 1993-1-12)
Part 2: Steel Bridges (EN 1993-2)
Part 3-1: Towers, masts and chimneys (EN 1993-3-1)
Part 3-2: Towers, masts and chimneys - Chimneys (EN 1993-3-2)
Part 4-1: Silos (EN 1993-4-1)
Part 4-2: Tanks (EN 1993-4-2)
Part 4-3: Pipelines (EN 1993-4-3)
Part 5: Piling (EN 1993-5)
Part 6: Crane supporting structures (EN 1993-6)

- Eurocode 4: Design of composite steel and concrete structures (EN 1994)

Part 1-1: General rules and rules for buildings (EN 1994-1-1)
Part 1-2: Structural fire design (EN 1994-1-2)
Part 2: General rules and rules for bridges (EN 1994-2)

- Eurocode 5: Design of timber structures (EN 1995)

Part 1-1: General – Common rules and rules for buildings (EN 1995-1-1)
Part 1-2: General – Structural fire design (EN 1995-1-2)
Part 2: Bridges (EN 1995-2)

- Eurocode 6: Design of masonry structures (EN 1996)

Part 1-1: General – Rules for reinforced and unreinforced masonry structures (EN 1996-1-1)
Part 1-2: General rules – Structural fire design (EN 1996-1-2)
Part 2: Design, selection of materials and execution of masonry (EN 1996-2)
Part 3: Simplified calculation methods for unreinforced masonry structures (EN 1996-3)

- Eurocode 7: Geotechnical design (EN 1997)

Part 1: General rules (EN 1997-1)
Part 2: Ground investigation and testing (EN 1997-2)
Part 3: Design assisted by field testing (EN 1997-3)

- Eurocode 8: Design of structures for earthquake resistance (EN 1998)

Part 1: General rules, seismic actions and rules for buildings (EN 1998-1)
Part 2: Bridges (EN 1998-2)
Part 3: Assessment and retrofitting of buildings (EN 1998-3)
Part 4: Silos, tanks and pipelines (EN 1998-4)
Part 5: Foundations, retaining structures and geotechnical aspects (EN 1998-5)
Part 6: Towers, masts and chimneys (EN 1998-6)

- Eurocode 9: Design of aluminium structures (EN 1999)

Part 1-1: General structural rules (EN 1999-1-1)
Part 1-2: Structural fire design (EN 1999-1-2)
Part 1-3: Structures susceptible to fatigue (EN 1999-1-3)
Part 1-4: Cold-formed structural sheeting (EN 1999-1-4)
Part 1-5: Shell structures (EN 1999-1-5)

Each of the codes (except EN 1990) is divided into a number of Parts covering specific aspects of the subject. In total there are 58 EN Eurocode parts distributed in the ten Eurocodes (EN 1990 – 1999).

All of the EN Eurocodes relating to materials have a Part 1-1 which covers the design of buildings and other civil engineering structures and a Part 1-2 for fire design. The codes for concrete, steel, composite steel and concrete, and timber structures and earthquake resistance have a Part 2 covering design of bridges. These Parts 2 should be used in combination with the appropriate general Parts (Parts 1).

== See also ==
- Geotechnical engineering
- Limit state design (Load and Resistance Factor Design)
- List of EN standards
- Structural engineering
- Structural robustness

=== Previous national standards ===
- BS 5950: British Standard on steel design, replaced by Eurocode 3 in March, 2010.
- BS 8110: British Standard on concrete design, replaced by Eurocode 2 in March, 2010.
- BS 6399: British Standard on loading for buildings, replaced by Eurocode 1 in March, 2010.
