= Permissible stress design =

Mechanical and civil design philosophy

Permissible stress design is a design philosophy used by mechanical engineers and civil engineers.

The civil designer ensures that the stresses developed in a structure due to service loads do not exceed the elastic limit. This limit is usually determined by ensuring that stresses remain within the limits through the use of factors of safety.

In structural engineering, the permissible stress design approach has generally been replaced internationally by limit state design (also known as ultimate stress design, or in USA, Load and Resistance Factor Design, LRFD) as far as structural engineering is considered, except for some isolated cases.

In USA structural engineering construction, allowable stress design (ASD) has not yet been completely superseded by limit state design except in the case of Suspension bridges, which changed from allowable stress design to limit state design in the 1960s. Wood, steel, and other materials are still frequently designed using allowable stress design, although LRFD is probably more commonly taught in the USA university system.

In mechanical engineering design such as design of pressure equipment, the method uses the actual loads predicted to be experienced in practice to calculate stress and deflection. Such loads may include pressure thrusts and the weight of materials. The predicted stresses and deflections are compared with allowable values that have a "factor" against various failure mechanisms such as leakage, yield, ultimate load prior to plastic failure, buckling, brittle fracture, fatigue, and vibration/harmonic effects. However, the predicted stresses almost always assume the material is linear elastic. The "factor" is sometimes called a factor of safety, although this is technically incorrect because the factor includes allowance for matters such as local stresses and manufacturing imperfections that are not specifically calculated; exceeding the allowable values is not considered to be good practice (i.e. is not "safe").

The permissible stress method is also known in some national standards as the working stress method because the predicted stresses are the unfactored stresses expected during operation of the equipment (e.g. AS1210, AS3990).

This mechanical engineering approach differs from an ultimate design approach which factors up the predicted loads for comparison with an ultimate failure limit. One method factors up the predicted load, the other method factors down the failure stress.

== See also ==
- Allowable Strength Design
- Building code
