= Eurocode 6: Design of masonry structures =

Logo of Eurocode 6

In the Eurocode series of European standards (EN) related to construction, Eurocode 6: Design of masonry structures (abbreviated EN 1996 or, informally, EC 6) describes how to design buildings and civil engineering works, or parts thereof, in unreinforced, reinforced, prestressed and confined masonry, using the limit state design philosophy. It was approved by the European Committee for Standardization (CEN) on 23 June 2005.

EN 1996 deals only with the requirements for resistance, serviceability and durability of masonry structures and is divided into the following parts.

== Part 1-1: General - Common rules and rules for buildings ==
In EN 1996-1-1, the basis for the design of buildings and civil engineering works in masonry is given, which deals with unreinforced masonry and reinforced masonry where the reinforcement is added to provide ductility, strength or improve serviceability.

=== Contents ===
- General
- Basis of design
- Materials
- Durability
- Structural analysis
- Ultimate limit states
- Serviceability limit states
- Detailing
- Execution.

== Part 1-2: General rules - Structural fire design ==
EN 1996-1-2 deals with the design of masonry structures for the accidental situation of fire exposure, and is intended to be used in conjunction with EN 1996-1-1, EN 1996-2, 1996-3 and EN 1991-1-2. This part only identifies differences from, or supplements to, normal temperature design and it deals only with passive methods of fire protection. Active methods are not covered.

== Part 2: Design considerations, selection of materials and execution of masonry ==
EN 1996-2 provides the necessary Principles and Application Rules for masonry to be designed and constructed satisfactorily in order to comply with the design assumptions of other parts of EN 1996.

== Part 3: Simplified calculation methods for unreinforced masonry structures ==
EN 1996-3 provides simplified calculation methods or simple rules to facilitate the design of particular types of masonry walls.
