= Keymark =

- Keymark logo
- Certifying agency: European Committee for Standardization, European Committee for Electrotechnical Standardization
- Effective region: Europe
- Legal status: Voluntary

The Keymark is a voluntary European certification mark demonstrating compliance with the European Standard (EN). It is owned by the European Committee for Standardization (CEN) and the European Committee for Electrotechnical Standardization (CENELEC).

The Keymark is the European mark based on the principle "one standard, one test, accepted everywhere". It is operated by certification bodies which have been empowered by CEN or CENELEC and who are accredited on the basis of EN 45011 (ISO/IEC Guide 65) by a signatory to the multilateral agreement (MLA) of the European Co-operation for Accreditation (EA).

Precondition for the certification is the establishment and the operation of a product-related factory production control (FPC) which takes into account the elements of the ISO 9000 series of standards and the process of the related production line from the raw material to finished product and storage of the product. The FPC shall form an integral part of the manufacturer's quality management system, if any. An example of the application of the Keymark symbol is the Solar Keymark.
