= Serviceability (structure) =

Conditions under which a building is still considered useful

In civil engineering and structural engineering, serviceability refers to the conditions under which a building or road surface is still considered useful or acceptable. Should these limit states be exceeded, a structure that may still be structurally sound would nevertheless be considered unfit.

For buildings, it refers to conditions other than the building strength that render them unusable. Serviceability limit state design of structures includes factors such as durability, overall stability, fire resistance, deflection, cracking and excessive vibration. For example, a skyscraper could sway severely and cause the occupants to be sick (much like sea-sickness), yet be perfectly sound structurally. This building is in no danger of collapsing, yet since it is obviously no longer fit for human occupation, it is considered to have exceeded its serviceability limit state.

== Serviceability limit ==
A serviceability limit defines the performance criterion for serviceability and corresponds to a conditions beyond which specified service requirements resulting from the planned use are no longer met. In limit state design, a structure fails its serviceability if the criteria of the serviceability limit state are not met during the specified service life and with the required reliability. Hence, the serviceability limit state identifies a civil engineering structure which fails to meet technical requirements for use even though it may be strong enough to remain standing. A structure that fails serviceability has exceeded a defined limit for one of the following properties:

- Excessive deflection
- Vibration
- Local deformation (engineering)

Serviceability limits are not always defined by building code developer, government or regulatory agency. Building codes tend to be restricted to ultimate limits related to public and occupant safety. Global geopolitical variations are likely to exist.
