= L'Ambiance Plaza collapse =

1987 building collapse in Bridgeport, Connecticut

- Date: April 23, 1987
- Location: Bridgeport, Connecticut; 41.1782°N 73.1964°W
- Cause: Building collapse
- Outcome: 28 construction workers killed

The L'Ambiance Plaza collapse was one of the worst disasters in modern Connecticut history. L'Ambiance Plaza was a 16-story residential project under construction in Bridgeport, Connecticut, at the corner of Washington Avenue and Coleman Street. Its partially erect frame completely collapsed on April 23, 1987, killing 28 construction workers. Failure was possibly due to high concrete stresses on the floor slabs by the placement process resulting in cracking, ending in a type of punch-through failure. Several observers suggested the collapse was preventable and highlighted the deficiencies of the lift slab construction technique. This collapse prompted a major nationwide federal investigation into lift slab construction as well as a temporary moratorium on its use in Connecticut.

In November 1988, less than two years after the disaster, a $41 million settlement of all legal claims arising from a disaster was achieved through mediation, avoiding years of potential litigation. Two judges – Robert C. Zampano of U.S. District Court and Frank S. Meadow of Connecticut Superior Court — mediated the dispute "through informal conferences among nearly 100 lawyers representing the victims' families and 40 contractors and subcontractors".

== See also ==
- Catastrophic failure
- Progressive collapse
- Structural failure
