= Eurocode 7: Geotechnical design =

Logo of Eurocode 7

In the Eurocode series of European standards (EN) related to construction, Eurocode 7: Geotechnical design (abbreviated EN 1997 or, informally, EC 7) describes how to design geotechnical structures, using the limit state design philosophy. It is published in two parts; "General rules" and "Ground investigation and testing". It was approved by the European Committee for Standardization (CEN) on 12 June 2006. Like other Eurocodes, it became mandatory in member states in March 2010.

Eurocode 7 is intended to:

- be used in conjunction with EN 1990, which establishes the principles and requirements for safety and serviceability, describes the basis of design and verification and gives guidelines for related aspects of structural reliability,
- be applied to the geotechnical aspects of the design of buildings and civil engineering works and it is concerned with the requirements for strength, stability, serviceability and durability of structures.

Eurocode 7 is composed of the following parts

== Part 1: General rules ==
EN 1997-1 is intended to be used as a general basis for the geotechnical aspects of the design of buildings and civil engineering works.

=== Contents ===
- General
- Basis of design
- Geotechnical data
- Supervision of construction, monitoring and maintenance
- Fill, dewatering, ground improvement and reinforcement
- Spread foundations
- Deep foundation (pile foundations)
- Anchorages
- Retaining structures
- Hydraulic failure
- Overall stability
- Embankments

EN 1997-1 is accompanied by Annexes A to J, which provide:

- Annex A Recommended partial safety factor values; different values of the partial factors may be set by the National annex.
- Annexes B to J Supplementary informative guidance such as internationally applied calculation methods.

== Part 2: Ground investigation and testing ==
EN 1997-2 is intended to be used in conjunction with EN 1997-1 and provides rules supplementary to EN 1997-1 related to planning and reporting of ground investigations, general requirements for a range of commonly used laboratory and field tests, interpretation and evaluation of test results and derivation of values of geotechnical parameters and coefficients.

== Part 3: Design assisted by field testing ==
There is no longer a Part 3. It was amalgamated into EN 1997-2
