= Robustness (economics) =

In economics, robustness is the ability of a financial trading system to remain effective under different markets and different market conditions, or the ability of an economic model to remain valid under different assumptions, parameters and initial conditions.

== See also ==
Robustness
