= BS 8110 =

BS 8110 is a withdrawn British Standard for the design and construction of reinforced and prestressed concrete structures. It is based on limit state design principles. Although used for most civil engineering and building structures, bridges and water-retaining structures are covered by separate standards (BS 5400 and BS 8007). The relevant committee of the British Standards Institute considers that there is no need to support BS 8110.

In 2010, BS 8110 was replaced by EN 1992 (Eurocode 2 or EC2). In general, EC2 used in conjunction with the National Annex, is not wildly different from BS 8110 in terms of the design approach. It gives similar answers and offers scope for more economic structures. Overall EC2 is less prescriptive, and its scope is more extensive than BS 8110 for example in permitting higher concrete strengths. In this sense the new code will permit designs not currently permitted in the UK, and this gives designers the opportunity to derive benefit from the considerable advances in concrete technology over recent years.
