= Progressive collapse =

Building collapse type

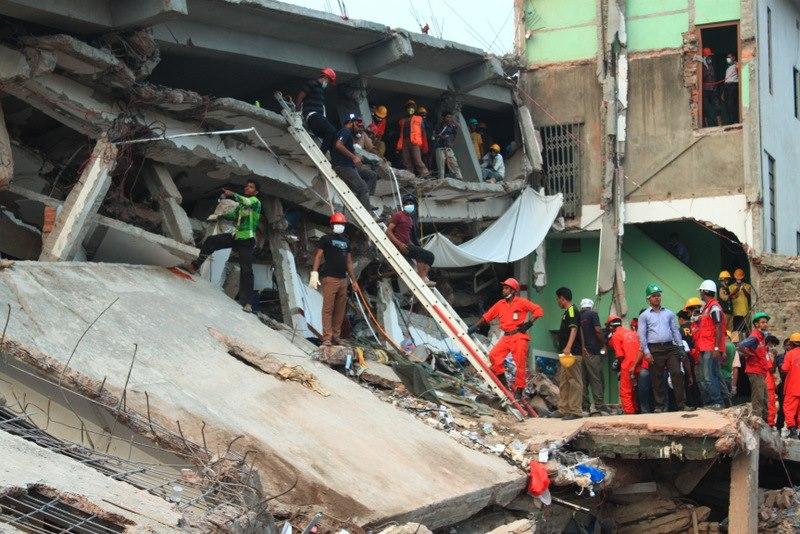
2013 Dhaka garment factory collapse

Simulation video of a progressive collapse

Progressive collapse is the process where a primary structural element fails, resulting in the failure of adjoining structural elements, which in turn causes further structural failure.

Progressive collapses may be accidental, as the result of design deficiencies, fire, unintentional overload, material failure or natural phenomenon (e.g. erosion, wind or earthquakes). They can also be induced deliberately as a demolition method, specifically that of building implosion, or caused by acts of terrorism or war.

== Notable examples ==
- On July 14, 1902, the 98 m (323-foot) St Mark's Campanile in Venice, Italy, collapsed after its northern load-bearing wall began to separate from the main structure. The cause of the separation was attributed to more than 700 years of wear on the structure, including fires, earthquakes, and stress redistribution, primarily from drying-induced shrinkage on the wooden support beams, the bells swaying back and forth, and creep. No one was injured except for a cat belonging to a caretaker. The tower was a stonemasonry design.
- On November 1, 1966, the seven-story University of Aberdeen Zoology Department building in Aberdeen, Scotland, suffered a total collapse while under construction. The collapse was attributed to poor girder welds that were weakened by metal fatigue. The metal fatigue was induced by oscillating lateral forces on the structure (primarily wind). Five people were killed and three others were injured. The building was a steel-frame design, and the collapse was the first known example of the total progressive collapse of a steel-framed building.
- On May 16, 1968, the 22-story Ronan Point apartment tower in West Ham, London, suffered a fatal collapse of one of its corners because of a natural-gas explosion, which destroyed a load-bearing wall. Four people were killed and 17 others were injured. The building was a large-panel system building.
- On March 2, 1973, the 26-story Skyline Plaza condominium tower in Fairfax County, Virginia, collapsed as a result of wooden shoring being removed too soon from an upper-story floor during construction. Fourteen people were killed and 34 others were injured. The tower was a steel-reinforced concrete design.
- On December 19, 1985, the 22-story commercial office building at 1000 Wilshire Blvd, Los Angeles, currently known as the Wedbush Building, experienced a partial collapse of the structure. Construction crews were offloading steel girders from a flatbed truck onto the deck of the newly completed fifth floor via crane when a girder broke loose from the crane and fell down on to the current stockpile below, which was already loaded to twice the maximum designed load capacity of the floor. This initiated a progressive collapse of the overloaded floor, causing the floor section and girders to crash through the bottom four floors, finally coming to rest in the parking garage. Three people were killed. The building was a steel-frame design.
- On March 15, 1986, the six-story Hotel New World in Little India, Singapore, collapsed because the structural engineer had forgotten to add the building's dead load (the weight of the building itself) to his calculations when determining the required strength of the building's support pillars when the hotel was constructed in 1971. Thirty-three people were killed and 17 others were injured. The building was a steel-reinforced concrete design.
- On April 23, 1987, the 16-story L'Ambiance Plaza in Bridgeport, Connecticut, collapsed during its construction phase as a result of various instances of inadequate shoring that were in use throughout the construction site. Twenty-eight people were killed. The building was a lift-slab design.
- On March 17, 1989, the 78 m (255-foot) Pavia Civic Tower in Pavia, Italy, collapsed after 800 years of stress redistribution on the structure, primarily from drying-induced shrinkage on the wooden support beams, the bells swaying back and forth, and creep. Four people were killed and 15 others were injured. The tower was a stonemasonry design.
- On May 10, 1993, the four-story Kader Toy Factory in Nakhon Pathom, Thailand, collapsed after fire broke out on the first floor and spread throughout the complex. The factory was in full production at the time and all fire exits were locked. The collapse killed 188 people and injured more than 500 others. The building was a steel-frame design.
- On May 24, 1993, the ancient bell tower at the medieval church of St. Maria Magdalena in Goch, Germany, collapsed. The cause was attributed to hundreds of years of stress redistribution on the structure, primarily from drying-induced shrinkage on the wooden support beams, the bells swaying back and forth in the centuries prior, creep, and weathering on the exposed and unmaintained masonry, including crack enlargement from water freezing and expanding between stones in the winter months, causing further expansion of cracks. No one was injured. The tower was a stonemasonry design.
- On April 19, 1995, the nine-story Alfred P. Murrah Federal Building in Oklahoma City, Oklahoma, collapsed after a truck bomb was detonated outside of the northern façade. The bomb's compression wave caused the fourth and fifth floors to shear up and off their columns and collapse onto the third floor. Floor 3 was connected to the main transfer beam, and pulled it inwards when Floors 4 and 5 fell on it. This caused all of the vertical columns on the northern perimeter that were connected to the transfer beam to collapse as well, along with any floor sections that depended on those columns for vertical support. The Oklahoma City bombing was the first-known example of a terrorist-initiated progressive collapse of a building on American soil. The attack killed 168 people and injured 680 others. The building was a steel-reinforced concrete design.
- On June 29, 1995, the five-story Sampoong Department Store in Seoul, South Korea, collapsed as the result of the removal of several support columns on the lower floors in order to make room for escalators. This lack of structural support was worsened years later by the addition of several heavy air conditioners on the roof above the area where support columns had been removed. This caused the support column that was closest to the air conditioners to fail and pass its load onto nearby columns, which led to complete failure and collapse within 24 hours of major cracks appearing around the failed column. The collapse killed 502 people and injured 937 others. The complex was a steel-reinforced concrete design.
- On September 11, 2001, World Trade Center Buildings 1, 2 and 7 in New York City collapsed as a result of terrorist attacks and the resulting fires. After a three-year investigation by the National Institute of Standards and Technology, it was concluded that fire weakened the steel structure until the long bridge-like floor sections (called trusses) began to progressively sag. This sagging converted the downward pull of the trusses into an inward pull. This intensifying inward pull on the walls eventually caused the outer columns of Tower 2, and later the inner columns of Tower 1, to buckle and fold, thus initiating the collapses. A total of 2,752 people died in the buildings, including 157 passengers and crew members who were aboard two hijacked airplanes that struck Buildings 1 and 2, initiating fires in both, with debris initiating fires in Building 7 upon the collapse of Buildings 1 and 2. The buildings were a steel-frame design. Progressive failure of the floor systems, or so-called "pancake theory," was ruled out as the initiating factor of the structural failure, but was found by both FEMA and NIST scientists to be the primary mode of failure after collapse initiation.
- On February 12, 2005, the 28-story Windsor Tower in Madrid, Spain, suffered the collapse of the upper 11 floors of the building. The tower had a reinforced concrete inner core surrounded by a traditional webbed steel-frame outer perimeter. Between Floors 16 and 17 was a seven-foot thick reinforced concrete transfer floor, designed to act as a bulkhead and to support the steel framework of the upper 11 stories. An office fire began on the 21st floor and after five hours, the concrete inner core could no longer support the buckling steel outer framework. The upper 11 stories collapsed down to street level with remnants of the upper three floors collapsing down on to the transfer floor. No one was killed. The building was a composite steel-frame and steel-reinforced concrete design.
- On August 1, 2007, the I-35W Mississippi River Bridge in Minneapolis, Minnesota, collapsed during afternoon rush hour, resulting in the deaths of 13 people. The collapse was attributed to the failure of a gusset plate connecting two members within one of the main arch ribs. Failure of this fracture-critical joint resulted in total collapse of the structure.
- On April 24, 2013, the eight-story Rana Plaza commercial office complex in Savar, Bangladesh, suffered a collapse to the majority of the structure. The building had been originally designed to accommodate shops and offices with light foot traffic, but it had been converted into a factory with heavy garment manufacturing equipment on the upper floors. This equipment acted like a mild tamping rammer by inducing oscillating forces to the building's frame. The use of substandard construction materials, along with the weight of the workers and machinery (which together exceeded the original designed load capacity of the floors), contributed to the weakening and eventual failure of key structural elements. The final collapse occurred one day after preliminary cracks began to appear throughout the building, suggesting that a key structural element had failed and was passing its load forces onto surrounding elements. A total of 1,129 people died in the building, and approximately 2,515 people were injured. The incident is considered the deadliest garment-factory accident in history, as well as the deadliest accidental structural failure in modern human history.
- On 19 January 2017, the Plasco Building, a high-rise building in Tehran, Iran, caught fire and collapsed. The fire started on the eighth floor and the progressive collapse occurred during rescue operations when approximately 200 firefighters were on the scene. It was reported that the collapse was of a pancake type because it had occurred straight down. The collapse appeared similar to those of the World Trade Center towers. Sixteen firefighters and ten civilians died as a result of the fire and collapse.
- On June 24, 2021, the 12-story Champlain Towers South condominium tower in Surfside, Florida, suffered a progressive collapse, killing 98. A cause is currently under investigation.

== Terminology ==
As the resulting damage in a progressive collapse is disproportionate to the original cause, the term disproportionate collapse is frequently used in engineering to describe this collapse type.

== Model code changes ==
Based on recommendations from the United States Commerce Department's National Institute of Standards and Technology (NIST), a comprehensive set of building code changes were approved by the International Code Council (ICC). The recommendations were based on the findings of NIST's three-year investigation of the collapses of New York City's World Trade Center (WTC) towers on September 11, 2001.

The proposals addressed areas such as increased resistance to building collapse from fire and other incidents, use of sprayed fire-resistive materials (commonly known as "fireproofing"), performance and redundancy of fire protection systems (i.e., automatic sprinklers), fuel oil storage/piping, elevators for use by first responders and evacuating occupants, the number and location of stairwells, and exit path markings.

The model code changes consistent with the NIST WTC investigation recommendations that are now required by the IBC include:

- Increased bond strength for fireproofing (nearly three times greater than previously required for buildings 25 to 130 metres (75 to 420 ft) in height and seven times greater for buildings more than 130 metres (420 ft) in height).
- Field installation requirements for fireproofing to ensure that:
  - installation complies with the manufacturer's instructions;
  - the substrates (surfaces being fireproofed) are clean and free of any condition that prevents adhesion;
  - testing is conducted to demonstrate that required adhesion is maintained for primed, painted or encapsulated steel surfaces; and
  - the finished condition of the installed fireproofing, upon complete drying or curing, does not exhibit cracks, voids, spalls, delamination or any exposure of the substrate.
- Special field inspections of fireproofing to ensure that its as-installed thickness, density and bond strength meet specified requirements, and that a bonding agent is applied when the bond strength is less than required due to the effect of a primed, painted or encapsulated steel surface. The inspections are to be performed after the rough installation of mechanical, electrical, plumbing, sprinkler and ceiling systems.
- Increasing by one hour the fire-resistance rating of structural components and assemblies in buildings 130 metres (420 ft) and higher. (This change was approved in a prior edition of the code.)
- Explicit adoption of the "structural frame" approach to fire resistance ratings that requires all members of the primary structural frame to have the higher fire resistance rating commonly required for columns. The primary structural frame includes the columns, other structural members including the girders, beams, trusses, and spandrels having direct connections to the columns, and bracing members designed to carry gravity loads.

== See also ==
- Applied element method
- Extreme Loading for Structures
- Structural robustness
- Cascading failure
