= Eurocode 1: Actions on structures =

Logo of Eurocode 1

In the Eurocode series of European standards (EN) related to construction, Eurocode 1: Actions on structures (abbreviated EN 1991 or, informally, EC 1) describes how to design load-bearing structures. It includes characteristic values for various types of loads and densities for all materials which are likely to be used in construction.

Eurocode 1 is divided into a number of parts.

== Part 1-1: Densities, self-weight, imposed loads for buildings ==
EN 1991-1-1 gives design guidance and actions for the structural design of buildings and civil engineering works including some geotechnical aspects for the following subjects:

1. Densities of construction materials and stored materials.
2. Self-weight of construction works.
3. Imposed loads for buildings.

== Part 1-2: Actions on structures exposed to fire ==
Part 1-2 of EN 1991 deals with thermal and mechanical actions on structures exposed to fire. It is intended to be used in conjunction with the fire design Parts of EN 1992 to EN 1996 and EN 1999 which give rules for designing structures for fire resistance.

Part 1-2 of EN 1991 contains thermal actions related to nominal and physically based thermal actions. More data and models for physically based thermal actions are given in annexes.

Part 1-2 of EN 1991 gives general principles and application rules in connection to thermal and mechanical actions to be used in conjunction with EN 1990, EN 1991-1-1, EN 1991-1-3 and EN 1991-1-4.

== Part 1-3: General actions - Snow loads ==
EN 1991-1-3 gives guidance to determine the values of loads due to snow to be used for the structural design of buildings and civil engineering works. It applies for sites at altitudes below 1500 m although treatments of snow loads for altitudes above 1500 m may be found in the National Annexes.

== Part 1-4: General actions - Wind actions ==
EN 1991-1-4 gives guidance on the determination of natural wind actions for the structural design of building and civil engineering works for each of the loaded areas under consideration. This includes the whole structure or parts of the structure or elements attached to the structure, e. g. components, cladding units and their fixings, safety and noise barriers.

EN 1991-1-4 is applicable to:

- Buildings and civil engineering works with heights up to 200 m.
- Bridges having no span greater than 200 m, provided that they satisfy the criteria for dynamic response.

== Part 1-5: General actions - Thermal actions ==
EN 1991-1-5 gives principles and rules for calculating thermal actions on buildings, bridges and other structures including their structural elements. Principles needed for cladding and other appendages of buildings are also provided.

EN 1991-1-5 describes the changes in the temperature of structural elements. Characteristic values of thermal actions are presented for use in the design of structures which are exposed to daily and seasonal climatic changes. Structures not so exposed may not need to be considered for thermal actions.

== Part 1-6: General actions - Actions during execution ==
EN 1991-1-6 provides principles and general rules for the determination of actions which should be taken into account during the execution of buildings and civil engineering works.

== Part 1-7: General actions - Accidental Actions ==
EN 1991-1-7 provides rules for safeguarding buildings and other civil engineering works against accidental actions. For buildings, EN 1991-1-7 also provides strategies to limit the consequences of localised failure caused by an unspecified accidental event. The recommended strategies for accidental actions range from the provision of measures to prevent or reduce the accidental action to that of designing the structure to sustain the action.

In this context specific rules are given for accidental actions caused by impact and internal explosions. Localised failure of a building structure, however, may result from a wide range of events that could possibly affect the building during its lifespan. Such events may not necessarily be anticipated by the designer.

This Part does not specifically deal with accidental actions caused by external explosions, warfare and terrorist activities, or the residual stability of buildings or other civil engineering works damaged by seismic action or fire etc. However, for buildings, adoption of the robustness strategies given in Annex A for safeguarding against the consequences of localised failure should ensure that the extent of the collapse of a building, if any, will not be disproportionate to the cause of the localised failure.

This Part does not apply to dust explosions in silos (see EN1991-4), nor to impact from traffic travelling on the bridge deck or to structures designed to accept ship impact in normal operating conditions e.g. quay walls and breasting dolphins.

See also Structural robustness.

== Part 2: Traffic loads on bridges ==
EN 1991-2 defines imposed loads (models and representative values) associated with road traffic, pedestrian actions and rail traffic which include, when relevant, dynamic effects and centrifugal, braking and acceleration actions and actions for accidental design situations.

=== Contents ===
- Definitions and symbols.
- Loading principles.
- Design situations.
- Loads (road bridges),
  - imposed loads due to traffic actions, their conditions of mutual combination and of combination with pedestrian and cycle traffic,
  - other actions.
- Loads (footways, cycle tracks and footbridges)
  - imposed loads,
  - other actions.
- Loads (Railway Bridges)
  - imposed loads due to rail traffic,
  - other actions.

== Part 3: Actions induced by cranes and machinery ==
EN 1991-3 specifies imposed loads (models and representative values) associated with cranes on runway beams and stationary machines which include, when relevant, dynamic effects and braking, acceleration and accidental forces.

=== Contents ===
- Common definitions and notations.
- Actions induced by cranes on runways.
- Actions induced by stationary machines.

== Part 4 : Silos and tanks ==
EN 1991-4 provides general principles and actions for the structural design of silos for the storage of particulate solids and tanks for the storage of fluids and shall be used in conjunction with EN 1990: Basis of Design, other parts of EN 1991 and EN 1992 to EN 1999.
