= Eurocode 8: Design of structures for earthquake resistance =

Logo of Eurocode 8

The Eurocode series of European standards (EN) related to construction, Eurocode 8: Design of structures for earthquake resistance (abbreviated EN 1998 or, informally, EC 8), describes how to design structures in seismic zones, using the limit state design philosophy. It was approved by the European Committee for Standardization (CEN) on 23 April 2004. Its purpose is to ensure that in the event of earthquakes:

- human lives are protected;
- damage is limited;
- and structures important for civil protection remain operational.

The random nature of the seismic events and the limited resources available to counter their effects are such as to make the attainment of these goals only partially possible and only measurable in probabilistic terms. The extent of the protection that can be provided to different categories of buildings, which is only measurable in probabilistic terms, is a matter of optimal allocation of resources and is therefore expected to vary from country to country, depending on the relative importance of the seismic risk with respect to risks of other origin and on the global economic resources.

Special structures, such as nuclear power plants, offshore structures and large dams, are beyond the scope of EN 1998. EN 1998 contains only those provisions that, in addition to the provisions of the other relevant Eurocodes, must be observed for the design of structures in seismic regions. It complements in this respect the other EN Eurocodes.

Eurocode 8 comprises several documents, grouped in six parts numbered from EN 1998-1 to EN 1998-6.

== Part 1: General rules, seismic actions and rules for buildings ==
EN 1998-1 applies to the design of buildings and civil engineering works in seismic regions. It is subdivided in 10 Sections, some of which are specifically devoted to the design of buildings.

- Section 1 of EN 1998-1 contains the scope, normative references, assumptions, principles and application rules, terms and definitions, symbols and units.
- Section 2 of EN 1998-1 contains the basic performance requirements and compliance criteria applicable to buildings and civil engineering works in seismic regions.
- Section 3 of EN 1998-1 gives the rules for the representation of seismic actions and for their combination with other actions. Certain types of structures, dealt with in EN 1998-2 to EN 1998-6, need complementing rules which are given in those Parts.
- Section 4 of EN 1998-1 contains general design rules relevant specifically to buildings.
- Sections 5 to 9 of EN 1998-1 contain specific rules for various structural materials and elements, relevant specifically to buildings as follows:
  - Section 5: Specific rules for concrete buildings;
  - Section 6: Specific rules for steel buildings;
  - Section 7: Specific rules for composite steel-concrete buildings;
  - Section 8: Specific rules for timber buildings;
  - Section 9: Specific rules for masonry buildings.
- Section 10 contains the fundamental requirements and other relevant aspects of design and safety related to base isolation of structures and specifically to base isolation of buildings.

== Part 2: Bridges ==
EN 1998-2 covers the seismic design of bridges in which the horizontal seismic actions are mainly resisted through bending of the piers or at the abutments; i.e. of bridges composed of vertical or nearly vertical pier systems supporting the traffic deck superstructure. It is also applicable to the seismic design of cable-stayed and arched bridges, although its provisions should not be considered as fully covering these cases.

== Part 3: Assessment and retrofitting of buildings ==
The scope of EN 1998-3 is defined as follows:

- To provide criteria for the evaluation of the seismic performance of existing individual building structures.
- To describe the approach in selecting necessary corrective measures
- To set forth criteria for the design of retrofitting measures (i.e. conception, structural analysis including intervention measures, final dimensioning of structural parts and their connections to existing structural elements).

== Part 4: Silos, tanks and pipelines ==
In EN 1998-4, principles and application rules for the seismic design of the structural aspects of facilities composed of above-ground and buried pipeline systems and of storage tanks of different types and uses, as well as for independent items, such as for example single water towers serving a specific purpose or groups of silos enclosing granular materials are addressed.

== Part 5: Foundations, retaining structures and geotechnical aspects ==
EN 1998-5 establishes the requirements, criteria, and rules for the siting and foundation soil of structures for earthquake resistance. It covers the design of different foundation systems, the design of earth retaining structures and soil-structure interaction under seismic actions.

== Part 6: Towers, masts and chimneys ==
EN 1998-6 establishes requirements, criteria, and rules for the design of tall slender structures: towers, including bell-towers, intake towers, radio and TV-towers, masts, chimneys (including free-standing industrial chimneys) and lighthouses.
