= Extreme Loading for Structures =

- Developer(s): Applied Science International
- Stable release: ELS Version 3.0 / September 3, 2009; 15 years ago
- Operating system: Windows
- Type: Simulation software
- Website: www.extremeloading.com

Extreme Loading for Structures (ELS) is commercial structural-analysis software based on the applied element method (AEM) for the automatic tracking and propagation of cracks, separation of elements, element collision, and collapse of structures under extreme loads. AEM combines features of Finite element method and Discrete element method simulation with its own solver capabilities for the generation of PC-based structural analysis.

== History ==
=== 2003 ===
- Research and development related to the software begins with the formation of Applied Science International. The first release of ELS appears in the form of 2D analysis with structures modeled, loading scenarios applied, and results viewed.

=== 2008 ===
- Version 2.0 allows users to perform 3D analysis, though modeling is largely limited to 2D and restricted 3D functionality.
- The United States Department of Homeland Security assigns ELS Designation Status for Anti-terrorism under the SAFETY Act.

=== 2009 ===
- ELS version 3.0 is released with complete 3D functionality.

== See also ==
- Failure analysis
- Physics engine
- Structural engineering
- Earthquake simulation
- Applied Element Method

== Academic institutions ==
More than 20 universities and academic institutions are currently involved in research and development projects resulting in the creation of publications on topics related to the Applied Element Method and Extreme Loading for Structures. Academic institutions working with ELS include:

Academic Institutions working with ELS
Auburn University	Carleton University	Concordia University	Dresden University of Technology
École de technologie supérieure	Helwan University	Technical Military Academy of Bucharest	Milwaukee School of Engineering
National Society for Earthquake Technology	National University of Singapore	Northeastern University	North Carolina State University
Pennsylvania State University	Portuguese Military Academy	Purdue University	Royal Military Academy (Belgium)
Rutgers University	Technical University of Cluj-Napoca	Tokyo Institute of Technology	United States Military Academy
University of Bristol	University of Connecticut	University of California	University of Miami
University of Missouri	University of Missouri–Kansas City	University of Oxford	University of Texas at Austin
University of Wollongong
