= Eurocode 2: Design of concrete structures =

Civil engineering works standard

Logo of Eurocode 2

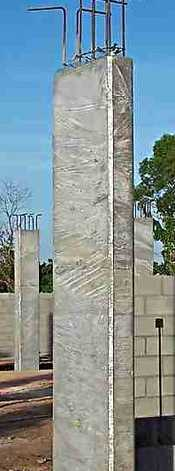
An example of a concrete structure

In the Eurocode series of European standards (EN) related to construction, Eurocode 2: Design of concrete structures (abbreviated EN 1992 or, informally, EC 2) specifies technical rules for the design of concrete, reinforced concrete and prestressed concrete structures, using the limit state design philosophy. It was approved by the European Committee for Standardization (CEN) on 16 April 2004 to enable designers across Europe to practice in any country that adopts the code.

Concrete is a very strong and economical material that performs exceedingly well under compression. Its weakness lies in its capability to carry tension forces and thus has its limitations. Steel on the other hand is slightly different; it is similarly strong in both compression and tension. Combining these two materials means engineers would be able to work with a composite material that is capable of carrying both tension and compression forces.

Eurocode 2 is intended to be used in conjunction with:

- EN 1990: Eurocode - Basis of structural design;
- EN 1991: Eurocode 1 - Actions on structures;
- hENs, ETAGs and ETAs: Construction products relevant for concrete structures;
- ENV 13670: Execution of concrete structures;
- EN 1997: Eurocode 7 - Geotechnical design;
- EN 1998: Eurocode 8 - Design of structures for earthquake resistance, when concrete structures are built in seismic regions.

Eurocode 2 is subdivided into the following parts:

== Part 1-1: General rules, and rules for buildings ==
EN 1992-1-1 deals with the rules and concepts required for designing concrete, reinforced concrete and prestressed concrete structures. There are three main stages are involved in the design of elements in these structures:

- Pre-design: Before any other designing is undertaken, the limit states of durability and fire design are considered in order to ascertain the required cover to the reinforcement, the minimum size of members and the appropriate concrete strength.
- Ultimate limit state: Accurate section sizes are determined for corresponding concrete properties (usually compressive strength). The size of the reinforced concrete element and the quantity of reinforcement to resist bending, shear and torsional forces are determined.
- Serviceability limit state. In this phase of the work, checks are made to ensure the serviceability criteria (i.e. that the building is comfortable to use) are met.

=== Pre-design ===
Pre-design stage involves selecting initial section sizes (e.g. reinforcement diameter), from which the minimum required cover depth could be selected to attain the required fire resistance. Although these initial estimates are likely to change throughout the design, giving considerable amount of thought at this stage is likely to save a lot of time later on.

=== Ultimate limit state ===
Ultimate limit states are often more critical for concrete structures. Consequently, when design is undertaken, the ultimate limit state is designed for and then if necessary serviceability is checked for. However, element sizes ascertained in the pre-design stage usually ensure serviceability criteria are met.

=== Serviceability limit state ===
Serviceability requirements to check for deflection and crack widths are generally satisfied by observing the following details.

- Checking and keeping within permitted span/effective depth ratios
- Providing not less than the minimum permitted percentage of reinforcement.
- Limiting the spacing of tension reinforcement.
- Using “deemed to satisfy” empirical methods.

If actual deflections are required, then the structure must be analysed for the serviceability limit state, using design service loads. The deflections obtained will generally be short term values and will be multiplied by a suitable factor to allow for creep effects and to give realistic long term values.

=== Contents ===
- General
- Basis of design
- Materials (concrete and steel) including
  - Concrete
  - Reinforcing steel
  - Prestressing steel
- Durability and cover to reinforcement
- Structural analysis
- Ultimate limit states
- Serviceability limit states
- Detailing reinforcement and prestressing tendons
- Detailing members, and particular rules
- Precast elements - additional rules
- Lightweight aggregated concrete structures
- Plain and lightly reinforced concrete structures

== Part 1-2: Structural fire design ==
EN 1992-1-2 deals with the design of concrete structures for the accidental situation of fire exposure and is intended to be used in conjunction with EN 1992-1-1 and EN 1991-1-2. This part 1-2 only identifies differences from, or supplements to, normal temperature design. Part 1-2 of EN 1992 deals only with passive methods of fire protection. Active methods are not covered.

EN 1992 part 1-3 does not exist. The rules for precast members are included in part 1-1.

Neither do the parts 1-4, 1-5 and 1-6 exist. The topics on lightweight aggregate, prestressed concrete and plain concrete are also included in part 1-1.

== Part 1-4: Lightweight aggregate concrete with closed structure ==
EN 1992-1-4 gives a general basis for the design of buildings and civil engineering works in reinforced and prestressed concrete made with lightweight aggregate concrete with closed structure.

== Part 1-5: Structures with unbonded and external prestressing tendons ==
EN 1992-1-5 gives a general basis for the design of reinforced concrete components provided with unbonded tendons placed within or outside the concrete. In addition, it provides design rules which are mainly applicable to buildings but, does not apply to structures subjected to significant fatigue under variable loads. It does also not apply to structures with tendons temporarily ungrouted during construction.

== Part 1-6: Plain concrete structures ==
EN 1992-1-6 provides supplementary rules to the general rules given in ENV 1992-1-1 for the design of components in building and civil engineering works in plain concrete made with normal weight aggregate.

== Part 2: Reinforced and prestressed concrete bridges ==
EN 1992-2 gives a basis for the design of bridges in plain, reinforced and prestressed concrete made with normal and light weight aggregates.

=== Contents ===
- General
- Basis of design
- Materials
- Durability and cover to reinforcement
- Structural analysis
- Ultimate limit states
- Serviceability limit states
- Detailing of reinforcement and prestressing tendons - General
- Detailing of members and particular rules
- Additional rules for precast concrete elements and structures
- Lightweight aggregate concrete structures
- Plain and lightly reinforced concrete structures
- Design for the execution stages

== Part 3: Liquid retaining and containing structures ==
EN 1992-3 complements EN 1992-1-1 for the particular aspects of liquid retaining structures and structures for the containment of granular solids.
