= EN 1090 =

European steel and aluminum structure standards

The EN 1090 standards are European standards that regulate the fabrication and assembly of steel and aluminium structures and are recognized by the Construction Products Regulation.

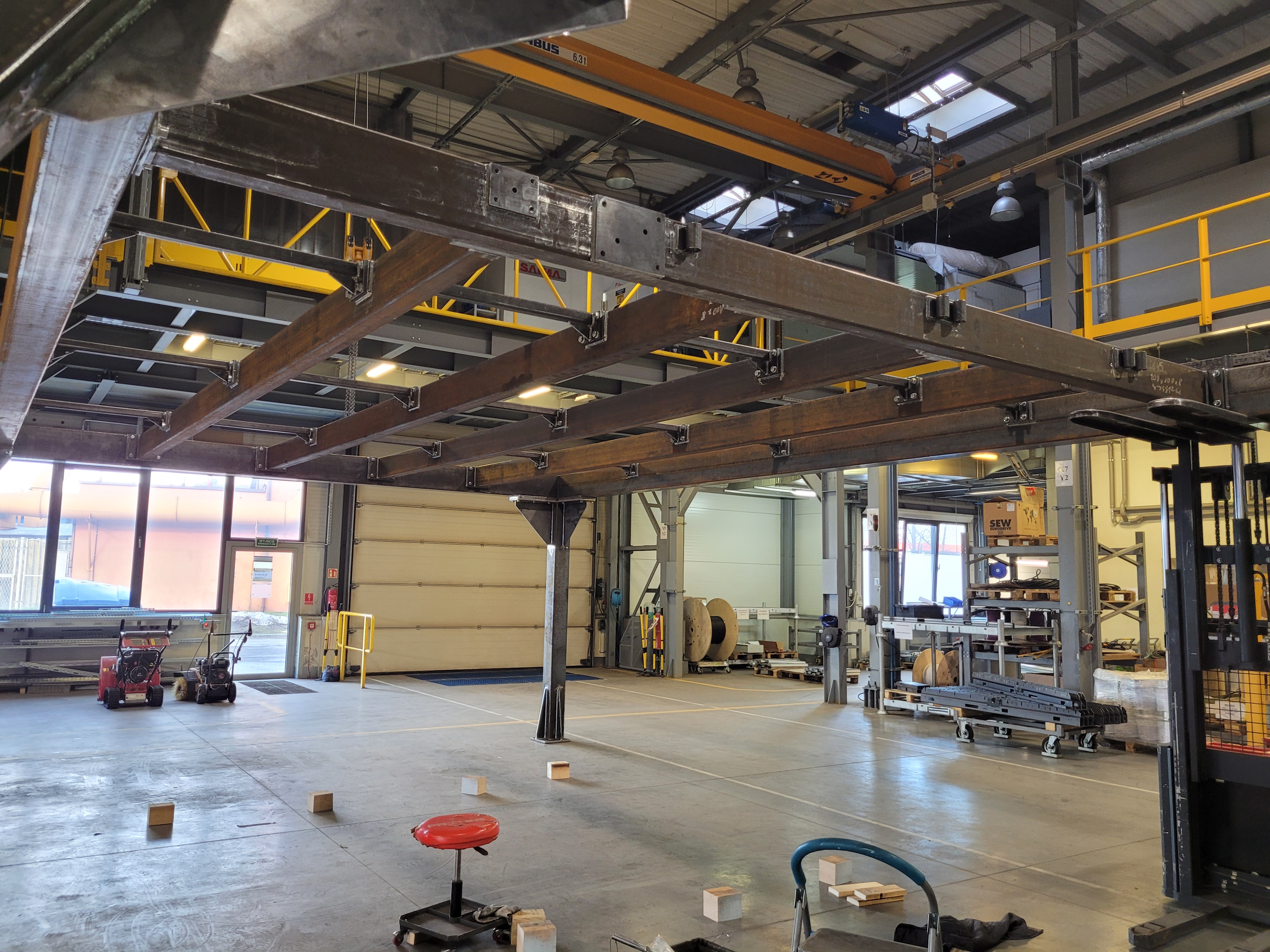
Manufacturing process of a typical steel structure welded according to EN 1090

EN 1090 comprises three parts:

- EN 1090-1: Requirements for conformity assessment for structural components (CE-Marking)
- EN 1090-2: Technical requirements for the execution of steel structures
- EN 1090-3: Technical requirements for the execution of aluminium structures

EN 1090 replaced the nationally applicable regulations, e.g. in Germany DIN 18800-7 and DIN V 4113-3.
