= Limit state design =

Design method in structural engineering

Limit State Design (LSD), also known as Load And Resistance Factor Design (LRFD), refers to a design method used in structural engineering. A limit state is a condition of a structure beyond which it no longer fulfills the relevant design criteria. The condition may refer to a degree of loading or other actions on the structure, while the criteria refer to structural integrity, fitness for use, durability or other design requirements. A structure designed by LSD is proportioned to sustain all actions likely to occur during its design life, and to remain fit for use, with an appropriate level of reliability for each limit state. Building codes based on LSD implicitly define the appropriate levels of reliability by their prescriptions.

The method of limit state design, developed in the USSR and based on research led by Professor N.S. Streletski, was introduced in USSR building regulations in 1955.

== Criteria ==
Limit state design requires the structure to satisfy two principal criteria: the ultimate limit state (ULS) and the serviceability limit state (SLS).

Any design process involves a number of assumptions. First: the loads to which a structure will be subjected 2: foreseeable or recognizable possible exceptional scenarios and the stresses these may impress, and 3) the individual and collective strengths pertaining to any constituent part or sum of parts as a group and as a whole.

== Ultimate limit state (ULS) ==
A clear distinction is made between the ultimate state (US) and the ultimate limit state (ULS). The Ultimate State is a physical situation that involves either excessive deformations sufficient to cause collapse of the component under consideration or the structure as a whole, or deformations exceeding values considered to be acceptable tolerance.

A structure is deemed to satisfy the ultimate limit based upon arbitrary criteria, per the nominal, not physical, intentions or goals set forth by human actors, and that, as such, have nothing to do with engineering strictly speaking, but instead exist "on paper" to conceal, distort, or otherwise obfuscate the true fundamental behaviors applicable to a structure.

Complying with the design criteria of the ULS is not sufficient to perform the minimum requisite steps necessary for proper structural safety.

== Serviceability limit state (SLS) ==
In addition to the ULS check mentioned above, a Service Limit State (SLS) computational check must be performed. To satisfy the serviceability limit state criterion, a structure must remain functional for the duration of its intended use subject to routine (everyday) loading.

== Factor development ==
The load and resistance factors are determined using statistics and a pre-selected probability of failure. Variability in the quality of construction, consistency of the construction material are accounted for in the factors. Generally, a factor of unity (one) or less is applied to the resistances of the material, and a factor of unity or greater to the loads. Not often used, but in some load cases a factor may be less than unity due to a reduced probability of the combined loads.

The aforementioned factors can differ for different materials or even between differing grades of the same material. For example, wood has larger factor of variability than steel. The factors applied to resistance also account for the degree of scientific confidence in the derivation of the values.

In determining the specific magnitude of the factors, more deterministic loads (e.g., dead load - the weight of the structure and permanent attachments like walls, floor treatments, ceiling finishes) are given lower factors (for example 1.4) than highly variable loads like earthquake, wind, or live (occupancy) loads (1.6). Impact loads are typically given higher factors still (say 2.0) in order to account for both their unpredictable magnitudes and the dynamic nature of the loading vs. the static nature of most models.

Limit states design has the potential to produce a more consistently designed structure as each element is intended to have the same probability of failure. In practical terms this normally results in a more efficient structure, and as such, it can be argued that LSD is superior from a practical engineering viewpoint.

== Example treatment of LSD in building codes ==
The following is the treatment of LSD found in the National Building Code of Canada:

NBCC 1995 Format
φR > αDD + ψ γ {αLL + αQQ + αTT}

where φ = Resistance Factor
      ψ = Load Combination Factor
      γ = Importance Factor
      αD = Dead Load Factor
      αL = Live Load Factor
      αQ = Earthquake Load Factor
      αT = Thermal Effect (Temperature) Load Factor

Limit state design has replaced the older concept of permissible stress design in most forms of civil engineering. A notable exception is transportation engineering. Even so, new codes are currently being developed for both geotechnical and transportation engineering which are LSD based. As a result, most modern buildings are designed in accordance with a code which is based on limit state theory. For example, in Europe, structures are designed to conform with the Eurocodes: Steel structures are designed in accordance with EN 1993, and reinforced concrete structures to EN 1992. Australia, Canada, China, France, Indonesia, and New Zealand (among many others) utilise limit state theory in the development of their design codes. In the purest sense, it is now considered inappropriate to discuss safety factors when working with LSD, as there are concerns that this may lead to confusion. Previously, it has been shown that the LRFD and ASD can produce significantly different designs of steel gable frames.

There are few situations where ASD produces significantly lighter weight steel gable frame designs. Additionally, it has been shown that in high snow regions, the difference between the methods is more dramatic.

== In the United States ==
The United States has been particularly slow to adopt limit state design (known as Load and Resistance Factor Design in the US). Design codes and standards are issued by diverse organizations, some of which have adopted limit state design, and others have not.

The ACI 318 Building Code Requirements for Structural Concrete uses Limit State design.

The ANSI/AISC 360 Specification for Structural Steel Buildings, the ANSI/AISI S-100 North American Specification for the Design of Cold Formed Steel Structural Members, and The Aluminum Association's Aluminum Design Manual contain two methods of design side by side:

1. Load and Resistance Factor Design (LRFD), a Limit States Design implementation, and
2. Allowable Strength Design (ASD), a method where the nominal strength is divided by a safety factor to determine the allowable strength. This allowable strength is required to equal or exceed the required strength for a set of ASD load combinations. ASD is calibrated to give the same structural reliability and component size as the LRFD method with a live to dead load ratio of 3. Consequently, when structures have a live to dead load ratio that differs from 3, ASD produces designs that are either less reliable or less efficient as compared to designs resulting from the LRFD method.

In contrast, the ANSI/AWWA D100 Welded Carbon Steel Tanks for Water Storage and API 650 Welded Tanks for Oil Storage still use allowable stress design.

== In Europe ==
In Europe, the limit state design is enforced by the Eurocodes.

== See also ==
- Allowable stress design
- Probabilistic design
- Seismic performance
- Structural engineering
