= European Committee for Standardization =

Standards organization

- Comité Européen de Normalisation; Europäisches Komitee für Normung

- Countries in the CEN community Members Affiliates Companion Standardization Bodies
- Abbreviation: CEN
- Formation: 1961
- Type: Regional standards organization
- Region served: Europe
- Website: www.cen.eu

The logo of the European Committee for Standardization for aluminium recycling

The European Committee for Standardization (CEN; French: Comité Européen de Normalisation) is a public standards organization whose mission is to foster the economy of the European single market and the wider European continent in global trading, the welfare of European citizens and the environment by providing an efficient infrastructure to interested parties for the development, maintenance and distribution of coherent sets of standards and specifications.

The CEN was founded in 1961. Its thirty-four national members work together to develop European Standards (ENs) in various sectors to build a European internal market for goods and services and to position Europe in the global economy. CEN is officially recognized as a European standards body by the European Union (EU), European Free Trade Association and the United Kingdom; the other official European standards bodies are the European Committee for Electrotechnical Standardization (CENELEC) and the European Telecommunications Standards Institute (ETSI).

More than 60,000 technical experts as well as business federations, consumer and other societal interest organizations are involved in the CEN network that reaches over 460 million people. CEN is the officially recognized standardization representative for sectors other than electrotechnical (CENELEC) and telecommunications (ETSI). On 12 February 1999, the European Parliament noted in a resolution that CEN, CENELEC and ETSI co-operate smoothly and that a merger of the three standardization bodies would not have clear advantages.

The standardization bodies of the thirty national members represent the twenty seven member states of the European Union, three countries of the European Free Trade Association (EFTA), the United Kingdom and other countries that are highly integrated into the European economy. CEN is contributing to the objectives of the EU and European Economic Area with technical standards (EN standards) which promote free trade, the safety of workers and consumers, interoperability of networks, environmental protection, exploitation of research and development programmes, and public procurement. An example of harmonized standards are those for materials and products used in construction and listed under the Construction Products Directive. The CE mark is a declaration by the manufacturer that a product complies with all relevant EU directives.

CEN (together with CENELEC) provide a CEN/CENELEC platform for the development of European Standards and other technical specifications across a wide range of sectors, also ensuring that standards correspond with any relevant EU legislation.

CEN (together with CENELEC) owns the Keymark, a voluntary quality mark for products and services. A product bearing the Keymark demonstrates conformity to European Standards.

== History ==
The Vienna Agreement was signed by CEN and the International Organization for Standardization (ISO) in 1991 but came in force in the mid-2000s. Its primary aim is to avoid duplication of (potentially conflicting) standards between CEN and ISO. In the last decade CEN has adopted a number of ISO standards which replaced the corresponding CEN standards.

On June 9, 2022, it was announced that ASTM International and CEN have agreed to extend and expand a Technical Cooperation Agreement from 2019.

== Agreement types ==
=== Members ===
As of 2026, CEN has 34 full members, including all 27 EU members, 3 EFTA members, as well as North Macedonia, Serbia, Turkey, and the United Kingdom.

- Austria
- Belgium
- Bulgaria
- Croatia
- Cyprus
- Czechia
- Denmark
- Estonia
- Finland
- France
- Germany
- Greece
- Hungary
- Iceland
- Ireland
- Italy
- Latvia
- Lithuania
- Luxembourg
- Malta
- Netherlands
- North Macedonia
- Norway
- Poland
- Portugal
- Romania
- Serbia
- Slovakia
- Slovenia
- Spain
- Sweden
- Switzerland
- Turkey
- United Kingdom

=== Affiliates ===
As of 2026 CEN has 6 affiliate members, all of which are candidates for EU accession:

- Albania
- Bosnia and Herzegovina
- Georgia
- Moldova
- Montenegro
- Ukraine

=== Others ===
As of 2026 CEN has signed Companion Standardization Body agreements with 12 countries:

- Armenia
- Australia
- Azerbaijan
- Canada
- Egypt
- Israel
- Ivory Coast
- Japan
- Jordan
- Kazakhstan
- Mongolia
- Tunisia

== See also ==
- ANEC (organisation), the European consumer voice in standardization
- Ecma International
- Institute for Reference Materials and Measurements
- List of EN standards
- List of CEN technical committees
- Eurocodes
