= Bridge design =

Structural engineering discipline

When designing a bridge to traverse a specific obstacle, the designer must identify a design that meets several requirements. The requirements may be categorized as engineering requirements and non-engineering requirements. Engineering requirements include safety, strength, lifespan, climate, traffic, the size and nature of the obstacle to be traversed, and clearance required for passage underneath.

Non-engineering requirements include construction cost, maintenance cost, aesthetics, time available for construction, customer preference, and experience of the builders. Other factors that may be weighed include impact to environment and wildlife; and the bridge's economic, social, and historic relationship to the local community.

Several designs may meet the requirements. After considering all factors, the bridge designer – in consultation with the customer – will select a particular design. The value engineering methodology can be used to select a final design from multiple alternatives. This methodology evaluates candidate designs based on weighted scores assigned to several different criteria, such as: cost, service life, durability, availability of resources, ease of construction, construction time, and maintenance cost.

== Material ==
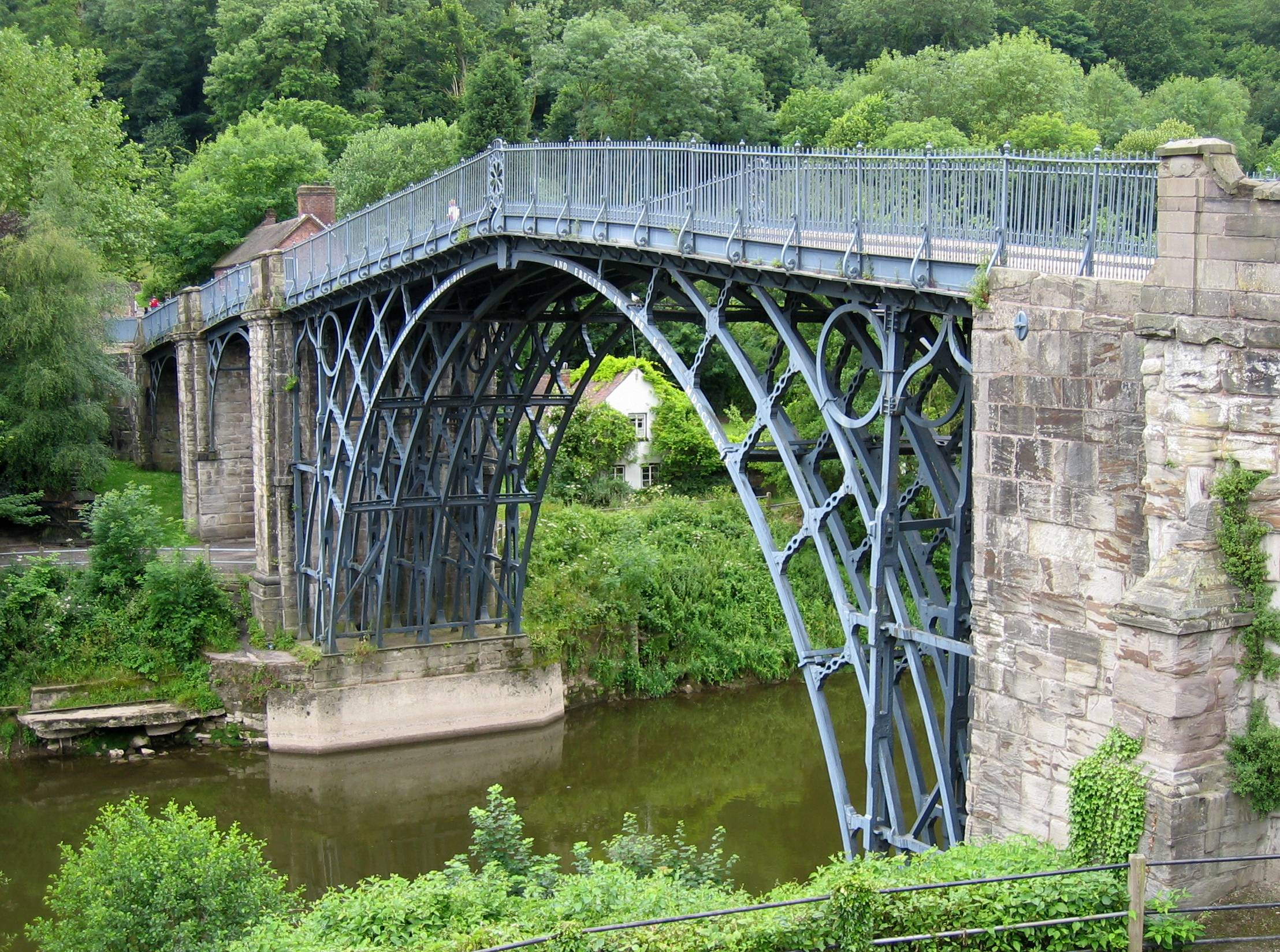
Iron Bridge in Shropshire, England, completed in 1781, is the first major bridge made of entirely of cast iron.

Bridges are built from a wide variety of materials, including wood, brick, rope, stone, iron, steel, and concrete. A bridge made from two or more distinct materials (such as steel and concrete) is known as a composite bridge.

Wood is an inexpensive material that is rarely used for modern motor vehicle roads. Wood is used in bridges primarily in a beam structure or truss structure, and is also used to build huge trestle bridges for railways. When wood is used, it is often in the form of glued laminated timber.

Masonry includes stone and brick, and is suitable only for elements of a bridge that are under compression, since masonry will crack if under tension. Therefore, masonry is limited to structures such as arches or foundations. In the twentieth century, large masonry bridges – although superseded by concrete in the West – continued to be built in China.

Iron, including cast iron and wrought iron, was used extensively from the late 1700s to late 1800s, primarily for arch and truss structures. Iron is relatively brittle, and has been superseded by the much stronger steel for all but ornamental uses.

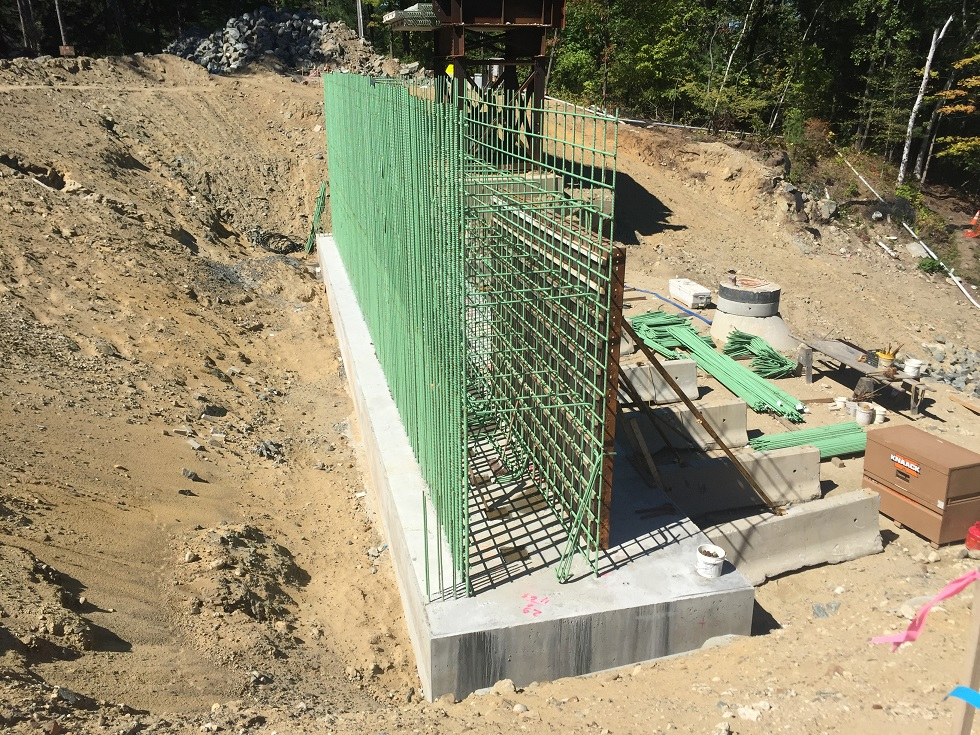
This concrete bridge support is being prepared for a concrete pour. The green reinforcing bars will be embedded inside the concrete after the concrete cures.

Steel is one of the most common materials used for modern bridges. Steel was made in small quantities in antiquity, but became widely available in the late 1800s following invention of new smelting processes by Henry Bessemer and William Siemens. Steel is especially useful for bridges, because it is strong in both compression and tension. Steel is widely used for truss bridges and beam bridges, and steel wires are an essential component of virtually all suspension bridges and cable-stayed bridges. Concrete bridges make extensive use of steel, because all concrete used in bridges contains steel reinforcing bars or steel prestressed cables. Steel bridges are more expensive than comparable concrete bridges, but they are much lighter (for the same strength), faster to build, and offer more flexibility during construction and repair.

Concrete is a strong and inexpensive material, but is brittle and can crack when in tension. Concrete is useful for bridge elements that are in compression, such as foundations and arches. Many roadway bridges are built entirely of concrete using a beam structure, often of the box girder variety. Virtually all concrete used in bridges contains steel reinforcing bars, which greatly increase the strength. Reinforcing bars are set inside the concrete form, and the concrete is poured into the form, and cures with the bars inside. If concrete is used in elements that experience tension – such as the lower region of a horizontal beam or slab – prestressed cables must be embedded within the concrete and tightened. The prestressed cables can be pre-tensioned (stretched before – and while – the concrete cures); or post-tensioned (placed within tubes in the concrete, and tightened after the concrete cures). The prestressed cables compress the concrete. When the beam is placed into the bridge and carries a load, the undesirable tension normally produced by the tendency of the beam to sag is counteracted by the compression from the prestressed cables. Concrete beams can be precast offsite and transported to the bridge site, or cast in place.

== Construction ==
=== Elements ===
Schematic diagram showing some structural elements of a bridge. 1 Approach, 2 Arch, 3 Truss, 4 Abutments, 5 Bearings, 6 Deck, 7 Pedestal, 8 Pier, 9 Pilings, 10 Footing, 11 Caisson, 12 Subsoil.

The elements of a bridge are generally divided into the superstructure and the substructure. The superstructure consists of most of the visible parts of a bridge, including the horizontal span, deck, wearing surface (e.g. the asphalt on top surface of the deck), trusses, arches, towers, cables, beams, and girders. The substructure consists of the lower portions of the bridge which support the superstructure, including the footings, abutments, piers, pilings, anchorages, and bearings.

Footings and abutments are large blocks of reinforced concrete, entirely or partially buried under ground, which support the entire weight of the bridge, and transfer the weight to the subsoil. Abutments are at the ends of a bridge span, where it contacts the subsoil, and sometimes direct the weight diagonally into the subsoil; they also act as retaining walls, keeping the subsoil under the approach road from eroding. Footings are directly underneath towers or piers, and take vertical weight. An anchorage is a massive block, usually made of concrete, that secures the ends of large cables in suspension bridges or cable-stayed bridges. Pilings are strong, lengthy objects (made of wood, steel, or concrete) placed below footings when the subsoil alone is not sufficient to support the weight of the bridge.

Bearings are mechanical devices placed between the superstructure and substructure which accommodate small rotational or slipping movements that result from thermal expansion and contraction, or minor seismic events.

=== Substructure ===
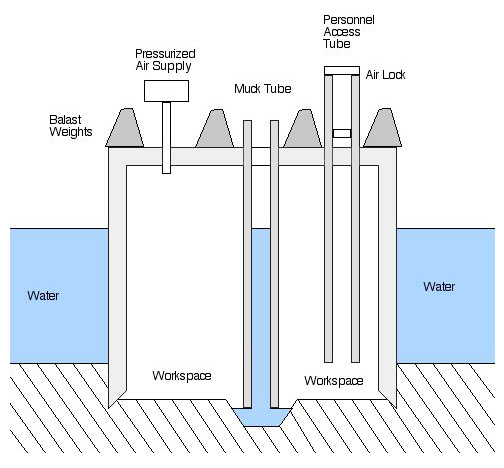
To build a bridge pier in water, workers excavate within a caisson. The entire caisson will be filled with concrete to create a footing.

Construction of all bridge types begins by creating the substructure. If the subsoil cannot support the load, pilings must first be driven below those foundation elements. Then, concrete footings are created for abutments, towers, and piers. After the concrete abutments and footings have been created, the piers and pedestals, if any, are built to complete the substructure.

When bridge supports (piers or towers) are built in a river, lake, or ocean, caissons are often used to provide a workspace while constructing the foundation for the supports. A caisson is a large, watertight, hollow structure, open on the bottom. It is usually sunk to the bottom of the water and workers can work inside, preparing the ground for the foundation. While workers in are inside the caisson, air pressure inside must be kept high to prevent water from seeping in. Workers, if they do not properly decompress when exiting the caisson, can get decompression sickness. Early bridge builders did not understand decompression, and deaths were common: thirteen workers died from decompression sickness when building the Eads Bridge (completed in 1874). The entire caisson may be filled with concrete to create the foundation. An alternative to a caisson is a cofferdam, which is a temporary dam surrounding the support location, open on top, where workers may work while constructing the foundation.

=== Superstructure ===
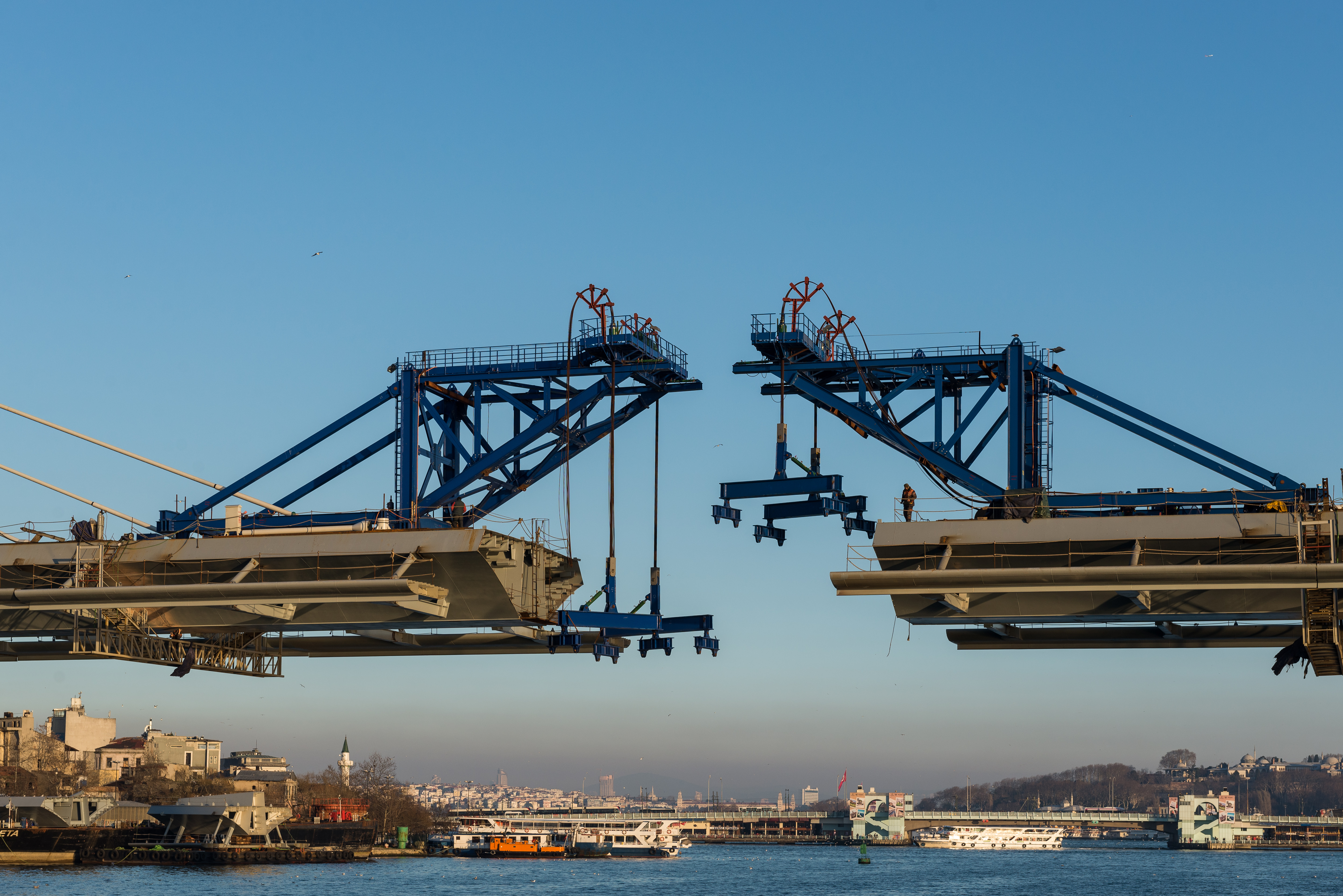
These cranes will lift the final deck section into place for the cable-stayed Golden Horn Bridge.

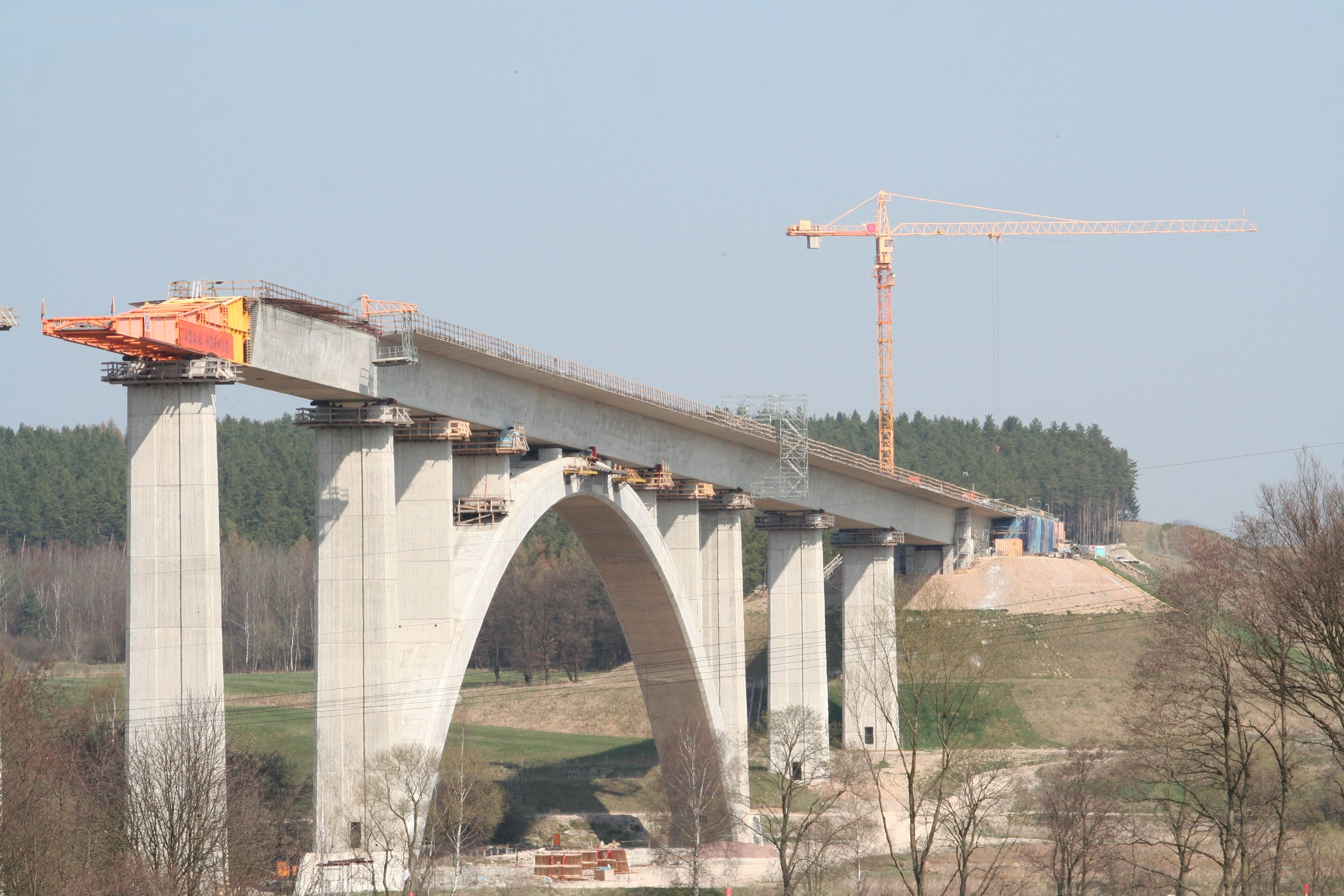
The deck of this arch bridge is being pushed into place with the launching process. The concrete deck is cast on the approach road; then hydraulic jacks slide it horizontally across the tops of the piers.

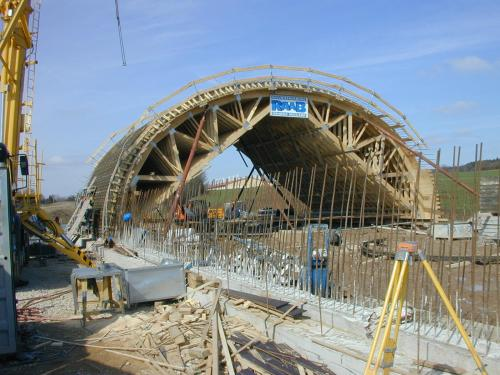
This temporary falsework will be removed after an arch is built over it.

After the substructure is complete, the superstructure – which will rest on the substructure – is built.

Beam bridge superstructures may be fabricated off-site (common for steel beams) or cast-in-place (for many concrete beams). The beams may be laid over the piers by a crane. If the span crosses a deep ravine, a technique known as launching may be used: the full span (beams and deck) are assembled on the approach road, then pushed horizontally across the obstacle. Box girders may be created by cantilevering.

Arch bridge superstructure construction depends on the material: for concrete arch, a temporary a falsework forms. Steel arches use the cantilevering method and build each side of the arch outward, joining in the center; temporary piers or falsework may be needed for larger arches.

Cantilever superstructures are usually built incrementally by proceeding outward from anchorages or piers. Most cantilever superstructures can be built without temporary support piers, as the bridge can support itself as it extends outward. A similar process is used for both steel or concrete cantilevers: pre-fabricated sections may be positioned a ground (or water) level and hoisted into place with a crane; or maybe transported horizontally along the previously completed portion of the cantilever. Concrete cantilevers require steel prestessing cables to be inserted through tubes inside each section as they are added, and tightened to put the concrete into compression.

Cable-stayed bridge superstructures begin by building one or more towers, which rest directly on footings that are part of the substructure. The deck is constructed in pieces beginning at the tower(s) and moving outward. As each piece of the deck is added, it is connected to towers with steel cables. The deck proceeds outwards in both directions at the same rate, to ensure the forces applied to the tower are balanced. if the deck is made of concrete, steel prestessing cables are inserted through tubes inside each deck section, and tightened to put the concrete into compression.

Suspension bridge superstructures start with the towers and anchorages (however, anchorages are not required for self-anchoring suspension bridges). The towers may be steel or concrete, and rest directly on the footings. The anchorages are large reinforced concrete blocks solidly anchored into the earth, since they must withstand the pull of the large cables that hold the entire deck and live load. After the towers are completed, a boat (if the bridge crosses water) carries a rope across the river, and the rope is hoisted to the top of the towers. Then a large wheel is then pulled back and forth across the rope, stringing two wires each pass. After hundreds of journeys, the wires are pressed together to form the cable. The cables are tied to the anchorages at both ends. Vertical wires called hangers are suspended from the cables, and the deck is then attached to the hangers in small sections.

=== Expansion joints ===
The superstructure of a bridge is additionally deformed in the longitudinal direction as a result of temperature changes and longitudinal forces from brakes of vehicle traffic, as well as in the case of prestressed concrete bridges, by the prestress and the creeping and shrinking of the concrete. These deformations do not occur on the abutment or to a smaller extent and must therefore be compensated for by a transitional construction. In addition, the roadway crossings should allow a safe crossing even at high speeds.

On the lateral sidewalks in the region of the caps or cornices, this gap is to be covered with a cover plate or can be completed flush with suitable joint profiles. The cover plate is made of stainless steel in accordance with DIN EN 10088.[ 5] Road crossings made of hot-dip galvanized steel have also been used for several years.[ 6] Road surface and waterproofing

=== Road surface ===
Nowadays, the road surface in Germany has a three-part structure of waterproofing, protective layer and cover layer. The sealing layer, which is about 2 cm thick, consists of bitumen welding membranes (with or without metal lamination) and protects the bridge superstructure from the penetration of surface water, frost and dew salt. A masking tape placed on the overlapping joints prevents the penetration of cover and adhesives into the protective layer. The approximately 4 cm thick protective layer is made of cast asphalt or rolling asphalt and serves to protect the sealing against mechanical stress from traffic and from weather conditions. An approximately 4 cm thick cover layer of asphalt concrete is applied to the protective layer for the immediate removal of the roadway loads. On subordinate private paths, such as forest roads or house entrances, wooden surfaces are also used, natural stone was used for old bridges (as in Roman bridges).

=== Drainage ===
The drainage is intended to drain the surface water produced quickly and completely, not only for reasons of road safety, but so that the covering can dry out as quickly as possible. As a rule, the water is discharged via a drainage system into rain overflow basins. Equipment

=== Electrical equipment ===
In 2011, a bridge was built in Berkenthin in Schleswig-Holstein over the Elbe-Lübeck Canal, whose road is heated by means of geothermal heat with 11 °C warm water from a depth of 80 meters to reduce accidents caused by freezing ice. There, there is a frequent change between frost and dew during dusk. Electrical installations

Many bridges carry overhead line poles and masts for telephone overhead lines. Alternatively, the lines are fastened to the support structure via cross members. Over the Storstrømsbroen, overhead lines of the interconnected network run. Bridge pillars of suspension bridges often carry transmitting antennas. For electrified railway lines with voltage-carrying overhead lines, all electrically conductive components must be grounded.

=== Railing ===
Bridge railings serve as fall protection for pedestrians and cyclists. Today, railings are mostly made of steel or aluminium and require a minimum height of 1.0 m at crash heights of less than 12 m. For larger crash heights, the minimum height is 1.1 m. Along cycle paths, a railing height of at least 1.3 m is provided in Germany cycling facilities and the Additional Technical Contract Conditions and Guidelines for Civil Engineering (ZTV-ING). In the case of existing structures, there is no need for action at railing heights of 1.2 m. In the case of road bridges with a length of more than 20 m, a wire rope is inserted into the then two-part handrail for stabilization.

=== Guardrails ===
Guardrails or spacer guardrails serve as a fall protection for motor vehicles or to secure the oncoming roadway against a breakout of vehicles. These are made of steel, in Austria partly made of aluminium. However, the use of aluminium is not unproblematic, because it is brittle over time and this often leads to serious and serious bodily injuries in accidents. Therefore, no new guardrails made of aluminium are installed in Austria and existing guardrails are replaced. As an alternative to the distance protection barriers, concrete protective walls for road boundary are also provided in Germany on motorway bridges.

=== Bearings ===
The bearings of a bridge are the contact points between superstructure and substructure. They must be designed in such a way that they enable the required rotational and tilting movements as well as displacements and enable low-force transmission of the bearing forces. Bearings of steel

Steel bearings are available as fixed line tilting bearings or as movable line bearings (roller bearings), which have long been common in motorway bridges in Germany, but are hardly used in new constructions. Roller bearings are made of steel cylinders that are held to the side and run on steel plates. You can make up for large movements of the bridge.

Elastomer bearings are deformation bearings, i.e. they transmit the forces via the deformation of the elastomer. They are made of an aging-resistant flexible plastic, in which steel plates are incorporated in reinforced bearings, which increase the compressive strength and reduce compressibility. The deformation bearings are movable on all sides and allow the reception of horizontal and vertical loads while simultaneously rotating about three axes and with simultaneous displaceability in two directions. The displaceability in the horizontal direction can be prevented by the arrangement of retaining constructions made of steel. The elastomer bearing cannot absorb as large movements as a roller bearing, but is less maintenance because the steel sheets do not come into contact with air and moisture and are therefore corrosion-protected and no moving parts are present. In the case of major deformations, the deformation plain bearing is used in which the elastomer bearing is provided with an additional sliding layer.

Through appropriate dimensioning and geometry as a concrete joint, reinforced concrete can also absorb twists and thus act as a non-displaceable bearing.

=== Towers and cables ===
A cable transfers its load to a tower by either (a) passing over a curved saddle (left image); or (b) the end of the cable is anchored into the tower (right image). Key: 1 Cable, 2 Saddle, 3 Anchor, 4 Tower.

This suspension bridge cable, shown in cross-section, consists of 37 strands, and each strand consists of multiple wires.

Towers are an important component of the superstructure of cable-stayed bridges and suspension bridges. (Note: The term "pylon" is sometimes used for a bridge tower.) Towers are made of either concrete or steel. Steel towers are much lighter than concrete towers (of the same height). Concrete is generally suitable only for towers up to about 250 meters (820 ft) tall, whereas steel towers can be much taller. (Note: Most towers are rigidly attached to the footings below them, but some relatively short towers have bearings at their base which permit pivoting.)

Towers hold the bridge cables, which – in turn – hold the weight of the bridge deck and the vehicular traffic. Most of the load imposed on a tower is applied vertically downward on the tower, rather than sideways. There are two mechanisms used to attach a cable to a tower: saddles and anchors. Saddles are curved structures which allow a cable to pass through (or over the top of) a tower. An anchor holds the end of a cable. Saddles are often used in suspension bridges, and anchors are often used in cable-stayed bridges.

Cables are made of one or more strands, and each strand consists of multiple wires. Each wire is a thin, flexible piece of solid steel, of higher tensile strength than normal steel, and with a diameter of 3mm to 7mm. Cables for large suspension bridges can reach over 1 meter (3 ft 3 in) in diameter and weigh over 20,000 tonnes. Cables are typically constructed at the bridge site by unspooling wires or strands from large reels. (Note: Some cables consist of a single strand, in that situation, if the strand is delivered to the bridge site on a reel, there is no need to construct the cable at the bridge site.)

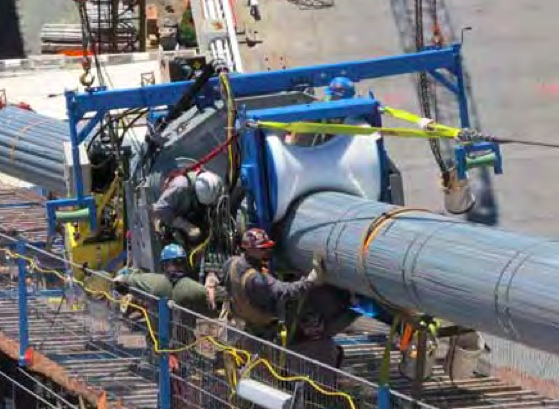
The blue machine is a cable compactor which is slowly moving along the cable from right to left. On the left, before compaction, the individual strands are distinguishable.

After the towers of a suspension bridge are built, the next step is to build a temporary catwalk to support the wires while they are drawn across the span and over the tops of the towers. There are two approaches to pulling the wires across the span: the air spinning (AS) method where the individual wires are carried across by pulleys; or the prefabricated parallel-wire strand (PPWS) method where entire strands are individually pulled across. (Note: For large suspension bridges, the length of wire or strand on a reel may not cross the full span, so when a reel reaches its end, the wires (or strands) must be welded to the wires (or strands) of a new reel.)

The AS method was used for all suspension bridges until the PPWS method was invented in the 1960s. The AS method is slower because it requires the spinning pulley to cross the span thousands of times, pulling a pair of wires each time. The PPWS method is more difficult, because it requires pulling heavy strands across the full span of the bridge. The PPWS method was used for the Akashi Kaikyo Bridge, where each strand weighed 94 tonnes and was 4 kilometres (2.5 mi) long.

The wires within a strand may be parallel, or they may wrap around each other in a twisted (spiral) pattern. When the wires are parallel, aerial spinning is typically used. When the wires are twisted, a strand may be built offsite and delivered on a reel to the bridge site. Twisted strands are typically used for the PPWS cable construction method.

After all the wires have been drawn across the full span and are connected to the towers, they are compacted into a tight bundle by an hydraulic device that moves along the cable and compresses the wires together. Then a wire is usually wrapped around the cable in a helical manner, to provide protection against water intrustion. The deck is suspended from the cable with vertical strands called hangers. Each hanger is attached to the main cable by a bracket called a cable band.

== Analysis and engineering ==
=== Loads and stresses ===
==== Load ====
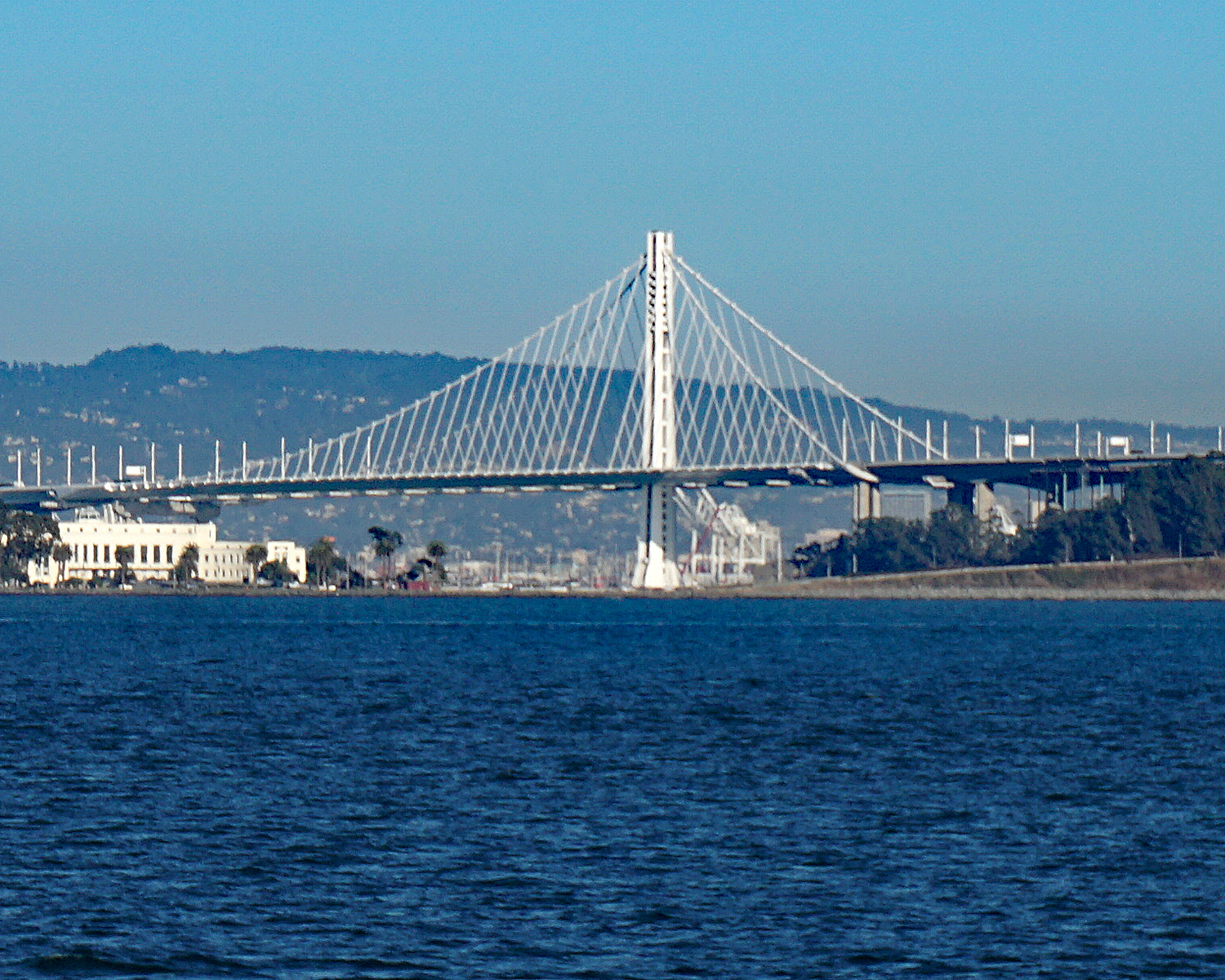
San Francisco–Oakland Bay Bridge is designed to withstand severe earthquakes. The eastern span, shown above, is a self-anchored suspension bridge which can survive a once-in-1,500-year earthquake.

A bridge design must accommodate all loads and forces that the bridge might experience. The totality of the forces that the bridge must tolerate is represented by the term "structural load". The structural load is usually divided into three components: The dead load, which is the weight of the bridge itself; (Note: The dead load also includes any permanent fixtures on the bridge, such as light poles, traffic signage, and guardrails;) the live load, which are the forces and vibrations caused by traffic passing over the bridge, including braking and acceleration; and the environmental load, which encompasses all forces applied by the bridge's surroundings, including wind, rain, snow, earthquakes, mudslides, water currents, flooding, soil subsidence, frost heaving, temperature fluctuations, and collisions (such as a ship striking the support of a bridge over water).

Many of the load sources vary over time, such as vehicle traffic, wind, and earthquakes. The bridge designer must anticipate the maximum values that those loads may reach during the course of the bridge's lifespan. For sporadic events like floods, earthquakes, collisions, and hurricanes, bridge designers must select a maximum severity that the design must accommodate. The designer first selects a return period, which typically ranges from 100 to 2,500 years. Longer return periods are used for bridges that are a critical part of the transportation infrastructure. For example, if the bridge is a key lifeline in case of emergencies, the designer may use relatively long return period, such as 2,000 years; in this example, the design must endure the strongest storm that is expected to happen once every 2,000 years.

==== Stress ====
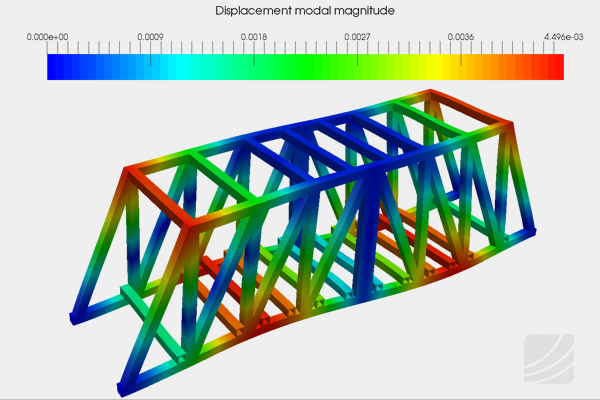
This images illustrates the frequence response of a bridge design when subject to certain vibrations.

The load forces acting on a bridge cause the components of the bridge to become stressed. The bridge designer must calculate the maximum stress that each bridge component will experience, and ensure that the components are sufficiently strong to tolerate the stresses.

Stresses are categorized as compression, tension, shear, and torsion. Compression includes forces that compacts a component by pushing inward (for example, as felt by a bridge foundation when a heavy tower is resting on it). Tension is a stretching force experienced by a component when pulled (for example by the cables of a suspension bridge). Shear is a sliding force experienced by a component when two offset external forces are applied in opposite directions (for example, as felt by a metal joint during an earthquake when one element of the joint moves north, and another element moves south). Torsion is a twisting force.

==== Traffic ====
An important component of the live load carried by a bridge is the vehicle and rail traffic the bridge is expected to carry. In addition to the weight of the vehicle, other forces must be considered, including braking, acceleration, centrifugal forces, and resonant frequencies. For roadways, the loads imposed by truck traffic far exceeds the loads imposed by passenger cars, and so the bridge design process focuses on trucks.

The loads created by trains and vehicles can be determined by computer modelling, or by relying on data and algorithms contained in engineering specifications published by standards such as Eurocode or AASHTO bridge specifications. In addition to algorithmic models contained in specifications, designers may determine traffic loads by using data from real-world measurements on existing bridges that experience traffic comparable to that the proposed bridge will experience. Technologies such as weigh-in-motion (WIM) can produce accurate data without the guesswork inherent in an algorithmic model.

==== Vibration and resonance ====
Tacoma Narrows Bridge collapsed shortly after opening in 1940 due to failure of the design to properly account for wind forces.

Many loads imposed on a bridge, including winds and vehicular traffic, can cause a bridge to experience irregular or periodic forces, which may cause bridge components to vibrate or oscillate. Many bridge components may have inherent resonant frequencies to which they are particularly susceptible, and vibrations near those frequencies can cause very large stresses. The bridge design process must identify potential vibrations and oscillations, and address them with techniques to minimize vibration, such as adding components to dampen movement or stiffen the structure.

Winds can produce a variety of forces on a bridge, including flutter and vortexes. Considering wind forces during the design process is especially important for long, slender bridges (typically suspension or cable-stayed bridges). Vibration and resonance concerns are especially important in longer bridges, but still must be accounted for in smaller bridges. The Eurocode guideline for bridge design specifies that vibration stress is due to moving vehicles should be accounted for by including an additional 10% to 70% of the vehicles' static load; the exact value depends on the span length, the number of traffic lanes, and the type of stress (bending moment or shear force).

Neglecting to account for vibrations and oscillations can lead to bridge failure. The Angers Bridge collapsed in 1850, killing over 200 people, partly due to soldiers marching on the bridge in a manner that increased resonant oscillations. The Tacoma Narrows Bridge collapsed in the 1940 in winds of 42 mph, even though the bridge was designed to withstand winds up to 120 mph. Investigations revealed that the designer failed to account for wind effects such as flutter and resonant vibrations. The Golden Gate Bridge was damaged in 1951 due to wind forces, and as a result was reinforced in the 1950s with additional stiffening elements.

=== Analysis and engineering ===
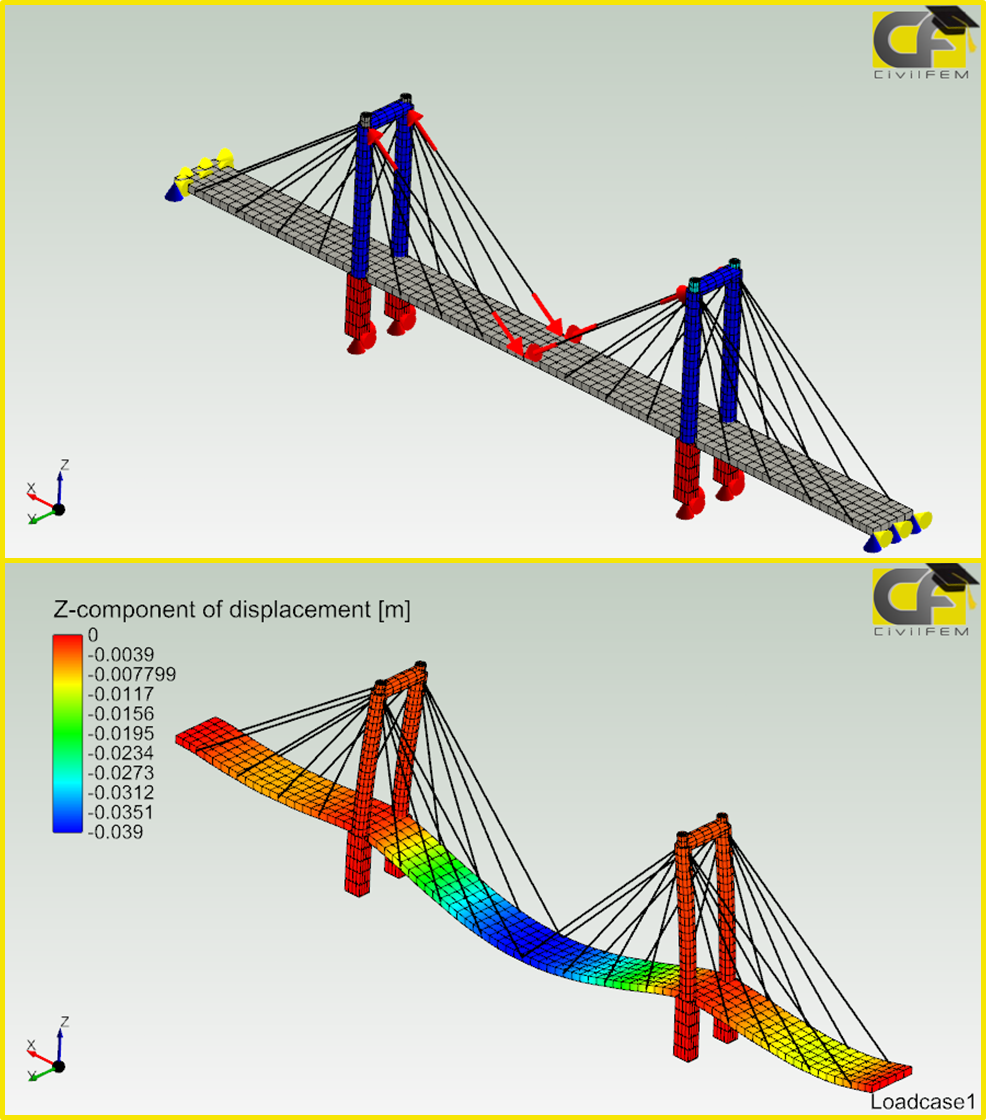
Engineers use finite element method software tools to evaluate a bridge design.

The process used to design bridges uses structural analysis methods and techniques. These methods divide the bridge into smaller components, and analyze the components individually, subject to certain constraints. A proposed bridge design is then modeled with formulas or computer applications. The models incorporate the loads and stresses the bridge will experience, as well as the bridge's structure and material. The models calculate the stresses in the bridge and provide data to the designer indicating whether the design meets the required design goals.

Bridge design models include both mathematical models and numerical models. The mathematical models that assess bridge loads and stresses are complex formulas that typically include differential equations. Solving these formulas directly is virtually impossible, so numerical models are used to provide approximate, but accurate, results. The finite element method is the most common numerical model used to perform detailed analysis of stresses and loads of a bridge design. (Note: An alternative to the finite element method is the simpler, but less powerful, finite strip method.) The finite element method models a proposed bridge by dividing it into numerous small, interconnected pieces, and applying a computer algorithm to the pieces. The algorithm simulates the stresses on the bridge that are caused by the loads, and can iterate over time to simulate dynamic movements.

A bridge designer evaluates the output of the models to determine if the design meets the design goals. Many criteria are evaluated when determining if a bridge design is sufficient, including deflection, cracking, fatigue, flexure, shear, torsion, buckling, settlement, bearing, and sliding. The criteria, and their allowable values, are termed limit states. The set of limit states selected for a design are based on the bridge's structure and purpose.

To ensure that a proposed bridge design is sufficiently strong to endure foreseeable stresses, most bridge designers use the Limit state design methodology (known as Load and Resistance Factor Design in United States). This methodology adds a margin of safety to the bridge design by incorporating safety factors into the design process. The safety factors are applied two ways: (a) increasing the assumed loads and stresses the bridge will experience; and (b) decreasing the assumed strength of the bridge's structure. (Note: The strength of a bridge component is referred to as "resistance" in the context of LRFD.) The magnitude of the safety factors are based on several considerations, including the bridge's own dead weight; vehicle traffic; earthquakes; water or ice flows (from rivers or ocean currents) impacting the bridge foundations; rain, snow or ice on the bridge; winds; settling into the soil; and collisions (such as vehicles on the deck striking a bridge tower; or a ship striking a bridge foundation).

=== Specifications and standards ===
Many countries have standards organizations which publish documents that identify acceptable bridge-building practices and designs. In Europe, the organization is the European Committee for Standardization, and the standards it publishes are the Eurocodes. In the United States, the American Association of State Highway and Transportation Officials (AASHTO) publishes the AASHTO LRFD Bridge Design Specifications. Canada's bridge standard is the Canadian Highway Bridge Design Code, developed by the non-profit CSA Group.

=== Protection ===
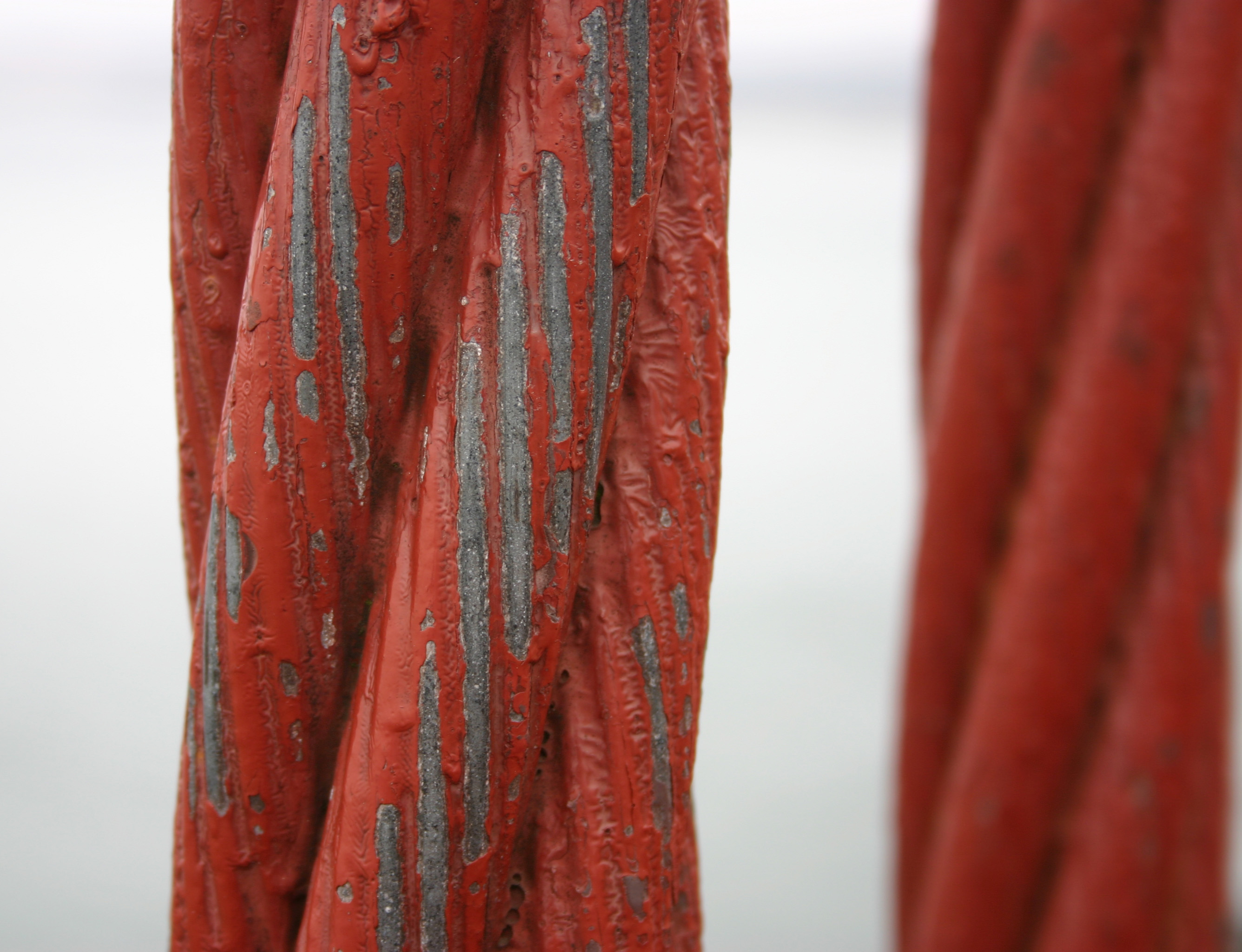
Paint can be used to reduce deterioration of steel components. Steel bridges need to be repainted periodically, as seen in this wire hanger from the Golden Gate Bridge, which is painted international orange.

To achieve a longer lifespan, a bridge can be protected from deterioration by incorporating certain features into the design. Bridges can deteriorate due to a variety of causes, including rust, corrosion, chemical actions, and mechanical abrasion. Deterioration is sometimes visible as rust on steel components, or cracks and spalling on concrete.

The deterioration can be slowed – thus prolonging the life of the bridge – by various measures, primarily aimed at excluding water and oxygen from the bridge elements. Techniques to prevent water-based damage include drainage systems, waterproofing membranes (such as polymer films), and eliminating expansion joints. (Note: Expansion joints relieve stress due to thermal expansion and contraction, but permit water to seep into vulnerable bridge elements, which can lead to corrosion and degradation. Integral bridge concepts are an alternative to expansion joints.)

Concrete bridge elements can be protected with waterproof seals and coatings. Reinforcing steel within concrete can be protected by using high-quality concrete and increasing the thickness of the outer concrete. Steel elements of a bridge can be protected by paints or galvanized coatings. Paint can be avoided entirely for steel members by using certain steel alloys, such as stainless steel or weathering steel (a steel alloy that eliminates the need for paint, by forming a protective outer layer of rust).

Bridge scour is a potentially serious problem when bridge foundations are located in water. Currents in the water can cause the sand and rocks around and below the foundation to wash-away over time. This effect can be mitigated by placing a cofferdam around the foundations, or surrounding the foundations with rip-rap.

=== Aesthetics ===
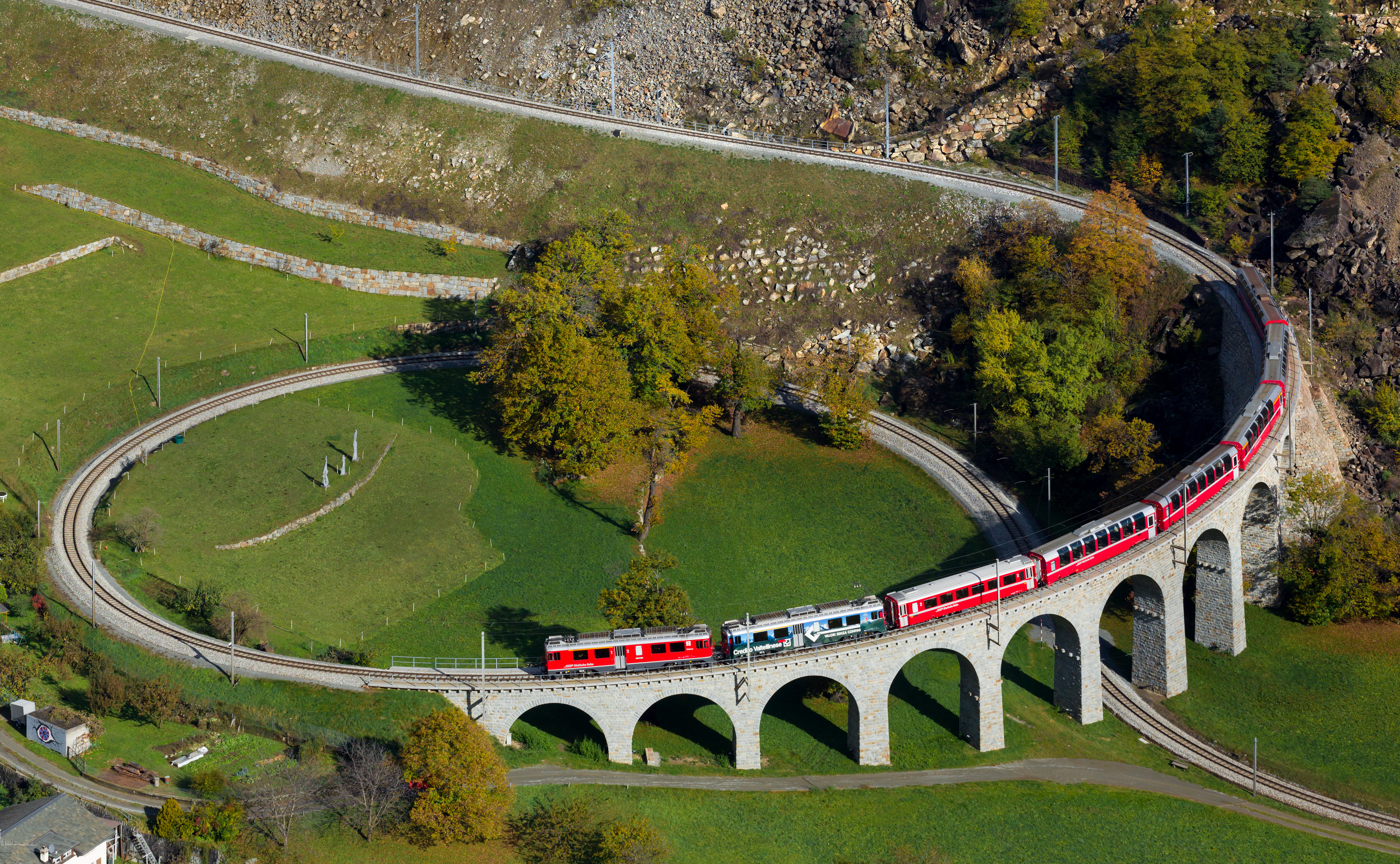
The Brusio spiral viaduct is part of the Bernina railway in Switzerland, designated as a World Heritage Site.-

Most bridges are utilitarian in appearance, but in some cases, the appearance of the bridge can have great importance. Bridges are typically more aesthetically pleasing if they are simple in shape, the deck is thinner in proportion to its span, the lines of the structure are continuous, and the shapes of the structural elements reflect the forces acting on them.

The art historian Dan Cruickshank writes that bridges are regarded as objects of beauty by many people:

Bridge construction remains... the most absolute expression of the beauty and excitement invoked by man-made constructions.... Bridges that are leaps of faith and imagination.... They are an act of creation that challenge the gods, works that possess the very power of nature itself. They are objects in which beauty is the direct result of functional excellence, conceptual elegance and boldness of design and construction.... A great bridge – one that defies and tames nature – ecomes almost in itself a supreme work of nature. Bridges embody the essence of mankind's structural ingenuity.... A great bridge has an emotional impact, it has a sublime quality and a heroic beauty that moves even those who are not accustomed to having their senses inflamed by the visual arts.

== See also ==
- List of bridge types
