= Designer =

Person who designs

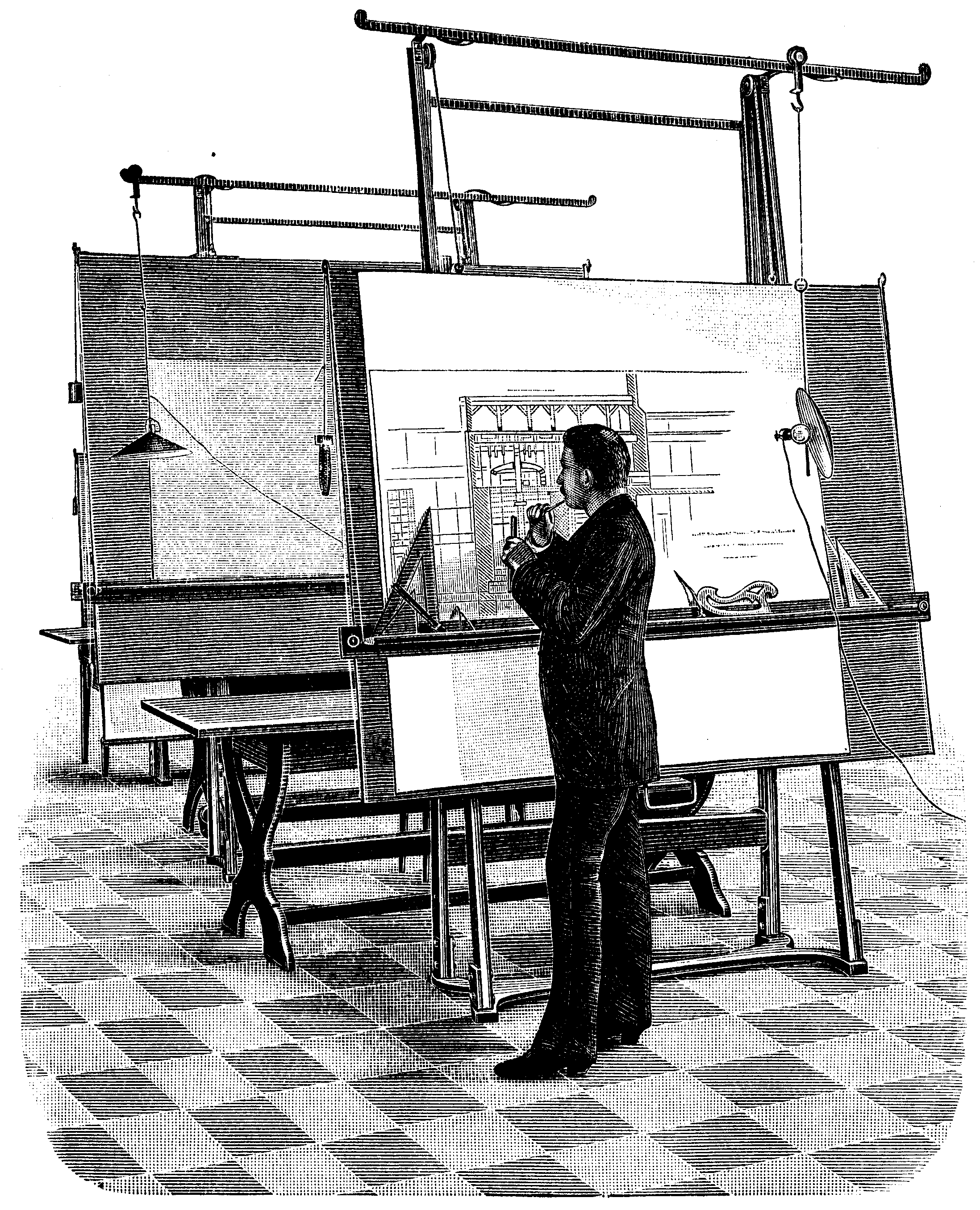
- MUSA

Occupation
- Occupation type: Profession

Description
- Competencies: Technical knowledge, teamwork abilities
- Fields of employment: see Design professions

A designer is a person who plans the form or structure of something before it is made, by preparing drawings or plans. In practice, anyone who creates tangible or intangible objects, products, processes, laws, games, graphics, services, or experiences can be called a designer.

== Overview ==
A designer is someone who conceptualizes and creates new concepts, ideas, or products for consumption by the general public. It differs from an artist, who creates works of art intended to be understood or appreciated by a particular audience. However, both disciplines require an understanding of aesthetics. The design of clothing, furniture, and other common artifacts were left mostly to tradition or artisans specializing in hand making them.

With the increasing complexity in industrial design of today's society, and due to the needs of mass production where more time is usually associated with more cost, the production methods became more complex and with them, the way designs and their production are created. The classical areas are now subdivided into smaller and more specialized domains of design (landscape design, urban design, interior design, industrial design, furniture design, fashion design, and much more) according to the product designed or perhaps its means of production. Despite various specializations within the design industry, all of them have similarities in terms of the approach, skills, and methods of working.

Using design methods and design thinking to resolve problems and create new solutions are the most important aspects of being a designer. Part of a designer's job is to get to know the audience they intend on serving.

In education, the methods of teaching or the program and theories followed vary according to schools and field of study. In industry, a design team for large projects is usually composed of a number of different types of designers and specialists. The relationships between team members will vary according to the proposed product, the processes of production or the research followed during the idea development, but normally they give an opportunity to everyone in the team to take a part in the creation process.

== Design professions ==
Different types of designers include:

- Animation
- Architectural design
- Automotive design
- Bridge designer
- CAD technician
- Communication design
- Costume design
- Design engineer
- Environmental design
- Exhibition design
- Fashion design
- Floral design
- Furniture design
- Game design
- Graphic design
- Industrial design
- Instructional design
- Interaction design
- Interior design
- Jewelry design
- Landscape design
- Lighting design
- Logo design
- Packaging design
- Product design
- Scenic design
- Service design
- Set design
- Software design
- Sound design
- Strategic design
- Systems design
- Textile design
- Transportation design
- Urban design
- User experience design
- User interface design
- Web design

== See also ==
- Architect
- Design
- Design engineer
- Design firm
- Design thinking
- List of 2D graphics software
- List of 3D modeling software
- List of 3D rendering software
- List of 3D animation software
- List of mechanical engineering software
- Visual arts
