= Cold-formed steel =

Steel products shaped by cold-working processes

Cold-formed steel (CFS) is the common term for steel products shaped by cold-working processes carried out near room temperature, such as rolling, pressing, stamping, bending, etc. Stock bars and sheets of cold-rolled steel (CRS) are commonly used in all areas of manufacturing. The terms are opposed to hot-formed steel and hot-rolled steel.

Cold-formed steel, especially in the form of thin gauge sheets, is commonly used in the construction industry for structural or non-structural items such as columns, beams, joists, studs, floor decking, built-up sections and other components. Such uses have become more and more popular in the US since their standardization in 1946.

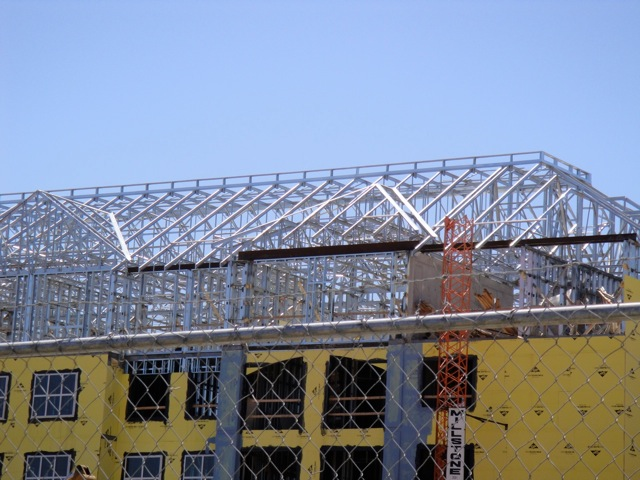
Cold-formed steel building

Cold-formed steel members have been used also in bridges, storage racks, grain bins, car bodies, railway coaches, highway products, transmission towers, transmission poles, drainage facilities, firearms, various types of equipment and others. These types of sections are cold-formed from steel sheet, strip, plate, or flat bar in roll forming machines, by press brake (machine press) or bending operations. The material thicknesses for such thin-walled steel members usually range from 0.0147 in. (0.373 mm) to about ¼ in. (6.35 mm). Steel plates and bars as thick as 1 in. (25.4 mm) can also be cold-formed successfully into structural shapes (AISI, 2007b).

== History ==
The use of cold-formed steel members in building construction began in the 1850s in both the United States and Great Britain. In the 1920s and 1930s, acceptance of cold-formed steel as a construction material was still limited because there was no adequate design standard and limited information on material use in building codes.

One of the first documented uses of cold-formed steel as a building material is the Virginia Baptist Hospital, constructed around 1925 in Lynchburg, Virginia. The walls were load bearing masonry, but the floor system was framed with double back-to-back cold-formed steel lipped channels. According to Chuck Greene, P.E., of Nolen Frisa Associates, the joists were adequate to carry the initial loads and spans, based on current analysis techniques. Greene engineered a recent renovation to the structure and said that for the most part, the joists are still performing well. A site observation during this renovation confirmed that "these joists from the 'roaring twenties' are still supporting loads, over 80 years later!"

In the 1940s, Lustron Homes built and sold almost 2500 steel-framed homes, with the framing, finishes, cabinets and furniture made from cold-formed steel.

== History of AISI design standards ==
Design standards for hot-rolled steel (see structural steel) were adopted in 1930s, but were not applicable to cold–formed sections because of their relatively thin steel walls which were susceptible to buckling. Cold-formed steel members maintain a constant thickness around their cross-section, whereas hot-rolled shapes typically exhibit tapering or fillets. Cold-formed steel allowed for shapes which differed greatly from the classical hot-rolled shapes. The material was easily workable; it could be deformed into many possible shapes. Even a small change in the geometry created significant changes in the strength characteristics of the section. It was necessary to establish some minimum requirements and laws to control the buckling and strength characteristics. Also it was observed that the thin walls underwent local buckling under small loads in some sections and that these elements were then capable of carrying higher loads even after local buckling of the members.

In the United States, the first edition of the Specification for the Design of Light Gage Steel Structural Members was published by the American Iron and Steel Institute (AISI) in 1946 (AISI, 1946). The first Allowable Stress Design (ASD) Specification was based on the research work sponsored by AISI at Cornell University under the direction of late Professor George Winter since 1939. As a result of this work, George Winter is now considered the grandfather of cold-formed steel design. The ASD Specification was subsequently revised in 1956, 1960, 1962, 1968, 1980, and 1986 to reflect the technical developments and the results of continued research at Cornell and other universities (Yu et al., 1996). In 1991, AISI published the first edition of the Load and Resistance Factor Design Specification developed at Missouri University of Science and Technology and Washington University in St. Louis under the directions of Wei-Wen Yu and Theodore V. Galambos (AISI, 1991). Both ASD and LRFD Specifications were combined into a single specification in 1996 (AISI, 1996).

In 2001, the first edition of the North American Specification for the Design of Cold-Formed Steel Structural Members was developed by a joint effort of the AISI Committee on Specifications, the Canadian Standards Association (CSA) Technical Committee on Cold-Formed Steel Structural Members, and Camara Nacional de la Industria del Hierro y del Acero (CANACERO) in Mexico (AISI, 2001). It included the ASD and LRFD methods for the United States and Mexico together with the Limit States Design (LSD) method for Canada. This North American Specification has been accredited by the American National Standard Institute (ANSI) as an ANSI Standard to supersede the 1996 AISI Specification and the 1994 CSA Standard. Following the successful use of the 2001 edition of the North American Specification for six years, it was revised and expanded in 2007.

This updated specification includes new and revised design provisions with the additions of the Direct Strength Method in Appendix 1 and the Second-Order Analysis of structural systems in Appendix 2.

In addition to the AISI specifications, the American Iron and Steel Institute has also published commentaries on various editions of the specifications, design manuals, framing design standards, various design guides, and design aids for using cold-formed steel. For details, see AISI website.

== International codes and standards ==
The United States, Mexico and Canada use the North American Specification for the Design of Cold-Formed Steel Structural Members, document number AISI S100-2007. Member states of the European Union use section 1-3 of the Eurocode 3 (EN 1993) for the design of cold formed steel members. Other nations utilize various design specifications, many based on AISI S-100, as adopted by the building codes listed below. Cold rolled steel is classified under Chapter 72 of the Harmonized System, which covers iron or steel articles.

Another list of international cold-formed steel codes and standards is maintained (and can be edited with permission) at Cold-Formed Steel Codes Around the World.

=== Africa ===
Ethiopia Building Codes: EBCS-1 Basis of design and actions on structures EBCS-3 Design of steel structures

=== Americas ===
United States Specification: North American Specification for the Design of Cold-Formed Steel Structural Members, document number AISI S100-2007 published by the American Iron and Steel Institute in October 2007. Building Code: IBC and/or NFPA may be enforced, but both reference AISI S100.

Canada Specification: North American Specification for the Design of Cold-Formed Steel Structural Members, document number CAN/CSA S136-07 as published by Canadian Standards Association. Building Code: The National Building Code of Canada is the model code adopted with amendments by individual Provinces and Territories. The Federal government is outside the jurisdiction of the Provincial/Territorial authority but usually defers to the legislated requirements within the Province/Territory of the building site.

Brazil Specification: NBR 14762:2001 Dimensionamento de estruturas de aço constituídas por perfis formados a frio - Procedimento (Cold-formed steel design - Procedure, last update 2001) and NBR 6355:2003 Perfis estruturais de aço formados a frio - Padronização (Cold-formed steel structural profiles, last update 2003) Building Code: ABNT - Associação Brasileira de Normas Técnicas (www.abnt.org.br)

Chile NCH 427 - suspended because it was written in the 1970s. Cold-formed steel sections were based in part on AISI (U.S). The local Institute for Building code INN has specified in recent Codes for seismic design that designers must use the last edition of the AISI Specification for cold formed steel and the AISC for hot rolled, in their original versions in English until some traduced adaption will be issued here .

Argentina CIRSOC 303 for Light Steel Structures where cold formed steel is included. That Specification, now more than 20 years old, is being replaced by a new one, which will be, in general, an adaption of the current AISI one. The former CIRSOC 303 was an adaption of the Canadian code of that time. At this time CIRSOC 303 was very old, now CIRSOC 301 is in revolution to be aligned with the American codes (LRFD design). In the near future both codes will be aligned also in designations and terminology.

=== Asia ===
Philippines National Structural Code of the Philippines 2010, Volume 1 Buildings, Towers, and other Vertical Structures, Chapter 5 Part 3 Design of Cold-Formed Steel Structural Members is based on AISI S100-2007

India Specification: IS:801 and IS:811, Indian standard code of practice for use of cold-formed light gauge steel structural members in general building construction, Bureau of Indian Standards, New Delhi (1975). (currently under revision) Building Code : see - model code National Building Code of India

China Specification: Technical Code of Cold-formed Thin-wall Steel Structures Building Code: GB 50018-2002 (current version)

Japan Specification: Design Manual of Light-gauge Steel Structures Building Code: Technical standard notification No. 1641 concerning light-gauge steel structures

Malaysia Malaysia uses British Standard BS5950, especially BS5950:Part 5; AS4600 (from Australia) is also referenced.

=== Europe ===
EU Countries Specification: EN 1993-1-3 (same as Eurocode 3 part 1-3), Design of steel structures - Cold formed thin gauge members and sheeting. Each European country will get its own National Annex Documents (NAD).

Germany Specification: German Committee for Steel Structures (DASt), DASt-Guidelines 016: 1992: Calculation and design of structures with thin-walled cold-formed members; In German Building Code: EN 1993-1-3: 2006 (Eurocode 3 Part 1-3): Design of steel structures – General rules – Supplementary rules for cold-formed members and sheeting; German version prEN 1090 2: 2005 (prEN 1090 Part 2; Draft): Execution of steel structures and aluminium structures – Technical requirements for the execution of steel structures; German version EN 10162: 2003: Cold-rolled steel sections – Technical delivery conditions – Dimensional and cross-sectional tolerances; German version

Italy Specification: UNI CNR 10022 (National Document) EN 1993-1-3 (Not compulsory)

United Kingdom Eurocode for cold-formed steel in the UK. BS EN 1993-1-3:2006: Eurocode 3. Design of steel structures. General rules.

=== Oceania ===
Australia Specification: AS/NZS 4600 AS/NZS 4600:2005 Similar to NAS 2007 but includes high strength steels such as G550 for all sections. (Greg Hancock) Building Code: Building Code of Australia (National document) calls AS/NZS 4600:2005

New Zealand Specification: AS/NZS 4600 (same as Australia)

== Common section profiles and applications ==
In building construction there are basically two types of structural steel: hot-rolled steel shapes and cold-formed steel shapes. The hot rolled steel shapes are formed at elevated temperatures while the cold-formed steel shapes are formed at room temperature. Cold-formed steel structural members are shapes commonly manufactured from steel plate, sheet metal or strip material. The manufacturing process involves forming the material by either press-braking or cold roll forming to achieve the desired shape.

When steel is formed by press-braking or cold rolled forming, there is a change in the mechanical properties of the material by virtue of the cold working of the metal. When a steel section is cold-formed from flat sheet or strip the yield strength, and to a lesser extent the ultimate strength, are increased as a result of this cold working, particularly in the bends of the section.

Some of the main properties of cold formed steel are as follows:

- Lightness in weight
- High strength and stiffness
- Ease of prefabrication and mass production
- Fast and easy erection and installation
- Substantial elimination of delays due to weather
- More accurate detailing
- Non shrinking and non creeping at ambient temperatures
- Formwork is not needed
- Termite-proof and rot proof
- Uniform quality
- Economy in transportation and handling
- Non-combustibile
- Recyclable material
- Panels and decks can provide enclosed cells for conduits.

A broad classification of the cold-formed shapes used in the construction industry can be made as individual structural framing members or panels and decks.

Some of the popular applications and the preferred sections are:

- Roof and wall systems (industrial, commercial, and agricultural buildings)
- Steel racks for supporting storage pallets
- Structural members for plane and space trusses
- Frameless Stressed skin structures: Corrugated sheets or sheeting profiles with stiffened edges are used for small structures up to a 30 ft clear span with no interior framework
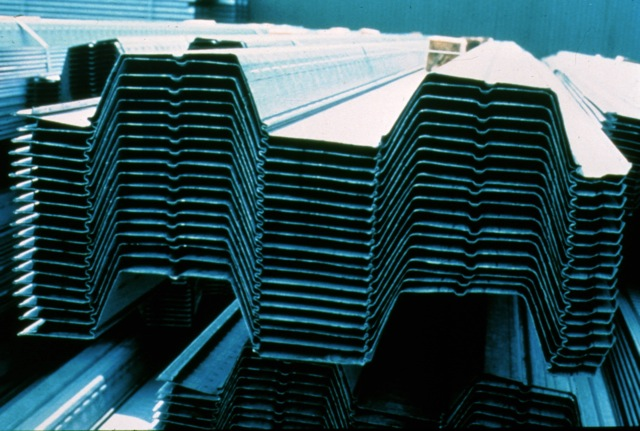
CFS Decking

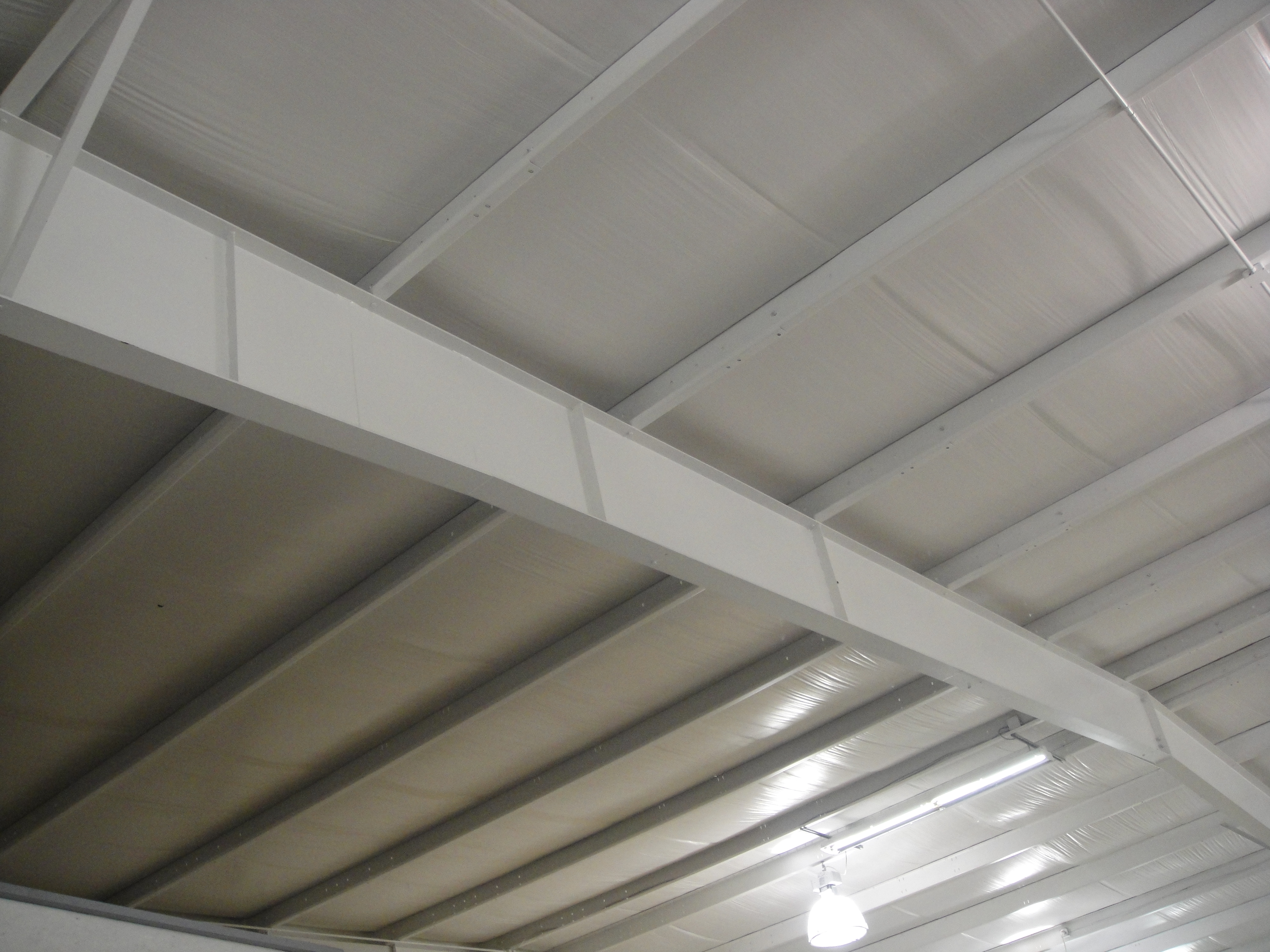
CFS purlins

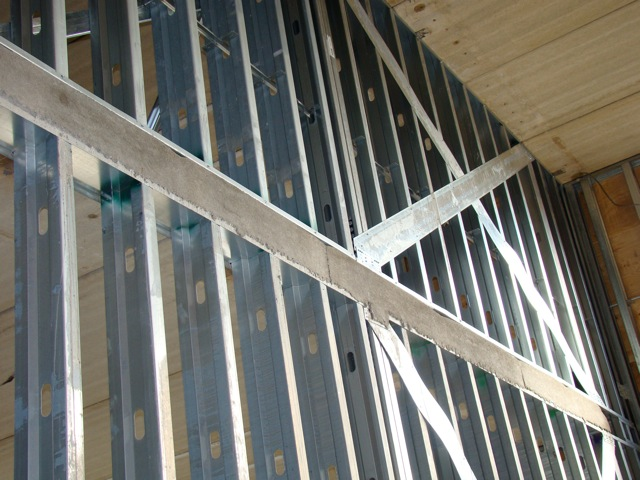
CFS X-braced wall system

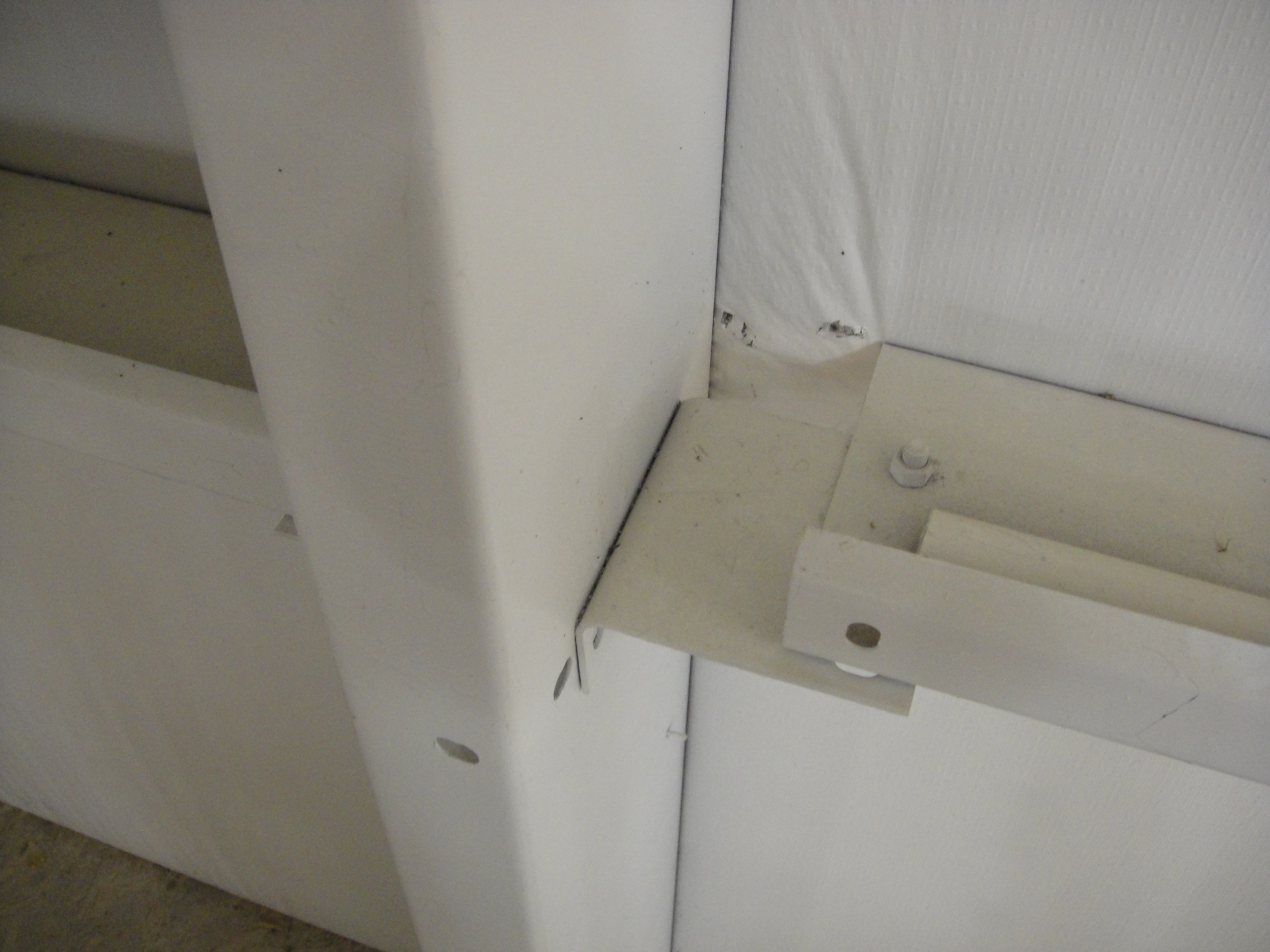
CFS stud/girt wall connection

The AISI Specification allows the use of steel to the following ASTM specifications in the table below:

Steel Designation	ASTM Designation	Product	Yield Strength Fy (ksi)	Tensile Strength Fu (ksi)	Fu / Fy	Minimum Elongation (%) in 2-in. Gage Length
Carbon structural steel	A36		36	58-80	1.61	23
	A36		50	70	1.4	21
High-strength low-alloy Structural steel	A242		46	67	1.46	21
Low and intermediate tensile strength carbon steel plates	A283					
	A		24	45-60	1.88	30
	B		27	50-65	1.85	28
	C		30	55-75	1.83	25
	D		33	60-80	1.82	23
Cold-formed welded and seamless carbon steel structural tubing in rounds and shapes	A500	Round Tubing				
	A		33	45	1.36	25
	B		42	58	1.38	23
	C		46	62	1.35	21
	D		36	58	1.61	23
		Shape Tubing				
	A		39	45	1.15	25
	B		46	58	1.26	23
	C		50	62	1.24	21
	D		36	58	1.61	23
High-strength carbon–manganese steel	A529 Gr. 42		42	60-85	1.43	22
	A529 Gr. 50		50	70-100	1.40	21
Hot-rolled carbon steel sheets and strips of structural quality	A570					
	Gr. 30		30	49	1.63	21
	Gr. 33		33	52	1.58	18
	Gr. 36		36	53	1.47	17
	Gr. 40		40	55	1.38	15
	Gr. 45		45	60	1.33	13
	Gr. 50		50	65	1.30	11
High-strength low-alloy columbium– vanadium steels of structural quality	A572					
	Gr. 42		42	60	1.43	24
	Gr. 50		50	65	1.30	21
	Gr. 60		60	75	1.25	18
	Gr. 65		65	80	1.23	17
High-strength low-alloy structural steel with 50 ksi minimum yield point	A588		50	70	1.40	21
Hot-rolled and cold-rolled high-strength low-alloy steel sheet and strip with improved corrosion resistance	A606	Hot-rolled as rolled cut length	50	70	1.40	22
		Hot-rolled as rolled coils	45	65	1.44	22
		Hot-rolled annealed	45	65	1.44	22
		Cold-rolled	45	65	1.44	22
Hot-rolled and cold-rolled high-strength low-alloy columbium and/or vanadium steel sheet and strip	A607 Class I					
	Gr.45		45	60	1.33	Hot rolled (23) Cold rolled (22)
	Gr.50		50	65	1.30	Hot rolled (20) Cold rolled (20)
	Gr.55		55	70	1.27	Hot rolled (18) Cold rolled (18)
	Gr.60		60	75	1.25	Hot rolled (16) Cold rolled (16)
	Gr.65		65	80	1.23	Hot rolled (14) Cold rolled (15)
	Gr.70		70	85	1.21	Hot rolled (12) Cold rolled (14)
	A607 Class II					
	Gr.45		45	55	1.22	Hot rolled (23) Cold rolled (22)
	Gr.50		50	60	1.20	Hot rolled (20) Cold rolled (20)
	Gr.55		55	65	1.18	Hot rolled (18) Cold rolled (18)
	Gr.60		60	70	1.17	Hot rolled (16) Cold rolled (16)
	Gr.65		65	75	1.15	Hot rolled (14) Cold rolled (15)
	Gr.70		70	80	1.14	Hot rolled (12) Cold rolled (14)
Cold-rolled carbon structural steel sheet	A611					
	A		25	42	1.68	26
	B		30	45	1.50	24
	C		33	48	1.45	22
	D		40	52	1.30	20
Zinc-coated or zinc-iron alloy-coated steel sheet	A653 SS					
	Gr. 33		33	45	1.36	20
	Gr. 37		37	52	1.41	18
	Gr. 40		40	55	1.38	16
	50 Class 1		50	65	1.30	12
	50 Class 3		50	70	1.40	12
	HSLAS Type A					
	50		50	60	1.20	20
	60		60	70	1.17	16
	70		70	80	1.14	12
	80		80	90	1.13	10
	HSLAS Type B					
	50		50	60	1.20	22
	60		60	70	1.17	18
	70		70	80	1.14	14
	80		80	90	1.13	12
Hot-rolled and cold-rolled high-strength low-alloy steel sheets and strip with improved formability	A715					
	Gr. 50		50	60	1.20	22
	Gr. 60		60	70	1.17	18
	Gr. 70		70	80	1.14	14
	Gr. 80		80	90	1.13	12
55% aluminum-zinc alloy-coated steel sheet by the hot-dip process	A792					
	Gr. 33		33	45	1.36	20
	Gr. 37		37	52	1.41	18
	Gr. 40		40	55	1.38	16
	Gr. 50A		50	65	1.30	12
Cold-formed welded and seamless high-strength, low-alloy structural tubing with improved atmospheric corrosion resistance	A847		50	70	1.40	19
Zinc-5% aluminum alloy-coated steel sheet by the hot-dip process	A875 SS					
	Gr. 33		33	45	1.36	20
	Gr. 37		37	52	1.41	18
	Gr. 40		40	55	1.38	16
	50 Class 1		50	65	1.30	12
	50 Class 3		50	70	1.40	12
	HSLAS Type A					
	50		50	60	1.20	20
	60		60	70	1.17	16
	70		70	80	1.14	12
	80		80	90	1.13	10
	HSLAS Type B					
	50		50	60	1.20	22
	60		60	70	1.17	18
	70		70	80	1.14	14
	80		80	90	1.13	12

== Typical stress–strain properties ==
A main property of steel, which is used to describe its behavior, is the stress–strain graph. The stress–strain graphs of cold-formed steel sheet mainly fall into two categories. They are sharp yielding and gradual yielding type illustrated below in Figure 1 and Figure 2, respectively.

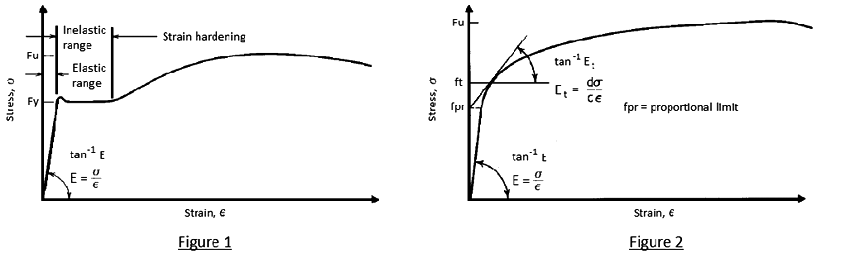

These two stress–strain curves are typical for cold-formed steel sheet during tension test. The second graph is the representation of the steel sheet that has undergone the cold-reducing (hard rolling) during manufacturing process, therefore it does not exhibit a yield point with a yield plateau. The initial slope of the curve may be lowered as a result of the prework. Unlike Figure 1, the stress–strain relationship in Figure 2 represents the behavior of annealed steel sheet. For this type of steel, the yield point is defined by the level at which the stress–strain curve becomes horizontal.

Cold forming has the effect of increasing the yield strength of steel, the increase being the consequence of cold working well into the strain-hardening range. This increase is in the zones where the material is deformed by bending or working. The yield stress can be assumed to have been increased by 15% or more for design purposes. The yield stress value of cold-formed steel is usually between 33ksi and 80ksi. The measured values of modulus of elasticity based on the standard methods usually range from 29,000 to 30,000 ksi (200 to 207 GPa). A value of 29,500 ksi (203 GPa) is recommended by AISI in its specification for design purposes. The ultimate tensile strength of steel sheets in the sections has little direct relationship to the design of those members. The load-carrying capacities of cold-formed steel flexural and compression members are usually limited by yield point or buckling stresses that are less than the yield point of steel, particularly for those compression elements having relatively large flat-width ratios and for compression members having relatively large slenderness ratios. The exceptions are bolted and welded connections, the strength of which depends not only on the yield point but also on the ultimate tensile strength of the material. Studies indicate that the effects of cold work on formed steel members depend largely upon the spread between the tensile and the yield strength of the virgin material.

== Ductility criteria ==
Ductility is defined as an extent to which a material can sustain plastic deformation without rupture. It is not only required in the forming process but is also needed for plastic redistribution of stress in members and connections, where stress concentration would occur. The ductility criteria and performance of low-ductility steels for cold-formed members and connections have been studied by Dhalla, Winter, and Errera at Cornell University. It was found that the ductility measurement in a standard tension test includes local ductility and uniform ductility. Local ductility is designated as the localized elongation at the eventual fracture zone. Uniform ductility is the ability of a tension coupon to undergo sizeable plastic deformations along its entire length prior to necking. This study also revealed that for the different ductility steels investigated, the elongation in 2-in. (50.8-mm) gage length did not correlate satisfactorily with either the local or the uniform ductility of the material. In order to be able to redistribute the stresses in the plastic range to avoid premature brittle fracture and to achieve full net-section strength in a tension member with stress concentrations, it is suggested that:

- The minimum local elongation in a - 1/2 in. (12.7-mm) gauge length of a standard tension coupon including the neck be at least 20%.
- The minimum uniform elongation in a 3-in. (76.2-mm) gauge length minus the elongation in a 1-in. (25.4-mm) gage length containing neck and fracture be at least 3%.
- The tensile-strength-to-yield-point ratio Fu /Fy be at least 1.05.

== Weldability ==
Weldability refers to the capacity of steel to be welded into a satisfactory, crack free, sound joint under fabrication conditions without difficulty. Welding is possible in cold-formed steel elements, but it shall follow the standards given in AISI S100-2007, Section E.

1.When thickness less than or equal to 3/16" (4.76mm):

The various possible welds in cold formed steel sections, where the thickness of the thinnest element in the connection is 3/16" or less are as follows

  - Groove Welds in Butt joints
  - Arc Spot Welds
  - Arc Seam Welds
  - Fillet Welds
  - Flare Groove Welds

2.When thickness greater than or equal to 3/16" (4.76mm):

Welded connections in which thickness of the thinnest connected arc is greater than 3/16" (4.76mm) shall be in accordance with ANSI/AISC-360. The weld positions are covered as per AISI S100-2007 (Table E2a)

=== Minimum material thickness recommended for welding connections ===
Application	Shop or Field fabrication	Electrode method	Suggested minimum CFS thickness
CFS to Structural steel	Field-fabrication	Stick-welding	54 to 68 mils
CFS to Structural steel	Shop-fabrication	Stick-welding	54 to 68 mils
CFS to CFS	Field-fabrication	Stick-welding	54 to 68 mils
CFS to CFS	Field-fabrication	Wire-fed MIG (Metal Inert Gas) welding	43 to 54 mils
CFS to CFS	Shop-fabrication	Wire-fed MIG (Metal Inert Gas) welding	33 mils

== Application in buildings ==
=== Cold-formed steel framing ===
Cold-formed steel framing (CFSF) refers specifically to members in light-frame building construction that are made entirely of sheet steel, formed to various shapes at ambient temperatures. The most common shape for CFSF members is a lipped channel, although "Z", "C", tubular, "hat" and other shapes and variations have been used. The building elements that are most often framed with cold-formed steel are floors, roofs, and walls, although other building elements and both structural and decorative assemblies may be steel framed.

Although cold-formed steel is used for several products in building construction, framing products are different in that they are typically used for wall studs, floor joists, rafters, and truss members. Examples of cold-formed steel that would not be considered framing includes metal roofing, roof and floor deck, composite deck, metal siding, and purlins and girts on metal buildings.

Framing members are typically spaced at 16 or 24 inches on center, with spacing variations lower and higher depending upon the loads and coverings. Wall members are typically vertical lipped channel "stud" members, which fit into unlipped channel "track" sections at the top and bottom. Similar configurations are used for both floor joist and rafter assemblies, but in a horizontal application for floors, and a horizontal or sloped application for roof framing. Additional elements of the framing system include fasteners and connectors, braces and bracing, clips and connectors.

In North America, member types have been divided into five major categories, and product nomenclature is based on those categories.

- S members are lipped channels, most often used for wall studs, floor joists, and ceiling or roof rafters.
- T members are unlipped channels, which are used for top and bottom plates (tracks) in walls, and rim joists in floor systems. Tracks also form the heads and sills of windows, and typically cap the top and bottom of boxed- or back-to-back headers.
- U members are unlipped channels that have a smaller depth than tracks, but are used to brace members, as well as for ceiling support systems.
- F members are "furring" or "hat" channels, typically used horizontally on walls or ceilings.
- L members are angles, which in some cases can be used for headers across openings, to distribute loads to the adjacent jamb studs.

In high-rise commercial and multi-family residential construction, CFSF is typically used for interior partitions and support of exterior walls and cladding. In many mid-rise and low-rise applications, the entire structural system can be framed with CFSF.

Cold Rolled Steel Buildings are manufactured from pre-galvanised steel coil. With this, it means getting all components of a Cold Rolled frame and a galvanised finish with no need for additional coating or painting.

=== Connectors and fasteners in framing ===
Connectors are used in cold-formed steel construction to attach members (i.e. studs, joists) to each other or to the primary structure for the purpose of load transfer and support. Since an assembly is only as strong as its weakest component, it is important to engineer each connection so that it meets specified performance requirements. There are two main connection types, Fixed and Movement-Allowing (Slip). Fixed connections of framing members do not allow movement of the connected parts. They can be found in axial-load bearing walls, curtain walls, trusses, roofs, and floors. Movement-Allowing connections are designed to allow deflection of the primary structure in the vertical direction due to live load, or in the horizontal direction due to wind or seismic loads, or both vertical and horizontal directions. One application for a vertical movement-allowing connection is to isolate non-axial load bearing walls (drywall) from the vertical live load of the structure and to prevent damage to finishes. A common clip for this application is an L-shaped top-of-wall clip for walls that are infill between floors. These clips have slots perpendicular to the bend in the clip. Another common clip is the bypass clip for walls that bypass outside the edge of the floor structure. When these clips are L-shaped, they have slots that are parallel to the bend in the clip. If the structure is in an active seismic zone, vertical and horizontal movement-allowing connections may be used to accommodate both the vertical deflection and horizontal drift of the structure.

Connectors may be fastened to cold-formed steel members and primary structure using welds, bolts, or self-drilling screws. These fastening methods are recognized in the American Iron and Steel Institute (AISI) 2007 North American Specification for the Design of Cold-Formed Steel Structural Members, Chapter E. Other fastening methods, such as clinching, power actuated fasteners (PAF), mechanical anchors, adhesive anchors and structural glue, are used based on manufacturer's performance-based tests.

== Hot-rolled versus cold-rolled steel and the influence of annealing ==
Material properties	Hot rolled	Cold rolled
Yielding strength	The material is not deformed; there is no initial strain in the material, hence yielding starts at actual yield value as the original material.	The yield value is increased by 15%–30% due to prework (initial deformation).
Modulus of elasticity	29,000 ksi	29,500 ksi
Unit weight	Unit weight is comparatively huge.	It is much smaller.
Ductility	More ductile in nature.	Less ductile.
Design	Most of the time, we consider only the global buckling of the member.	Local buckling, Distortional Buckling, Global Buckling have to be considered.
Main uses	Load bearing structures, usually heavy load bearing structures and where ductility is more important ( Example Seismic prone areas)	Application in many variety of loading cases. This includes building frames, automobile, aircraft, home appliances, etc. Use limited in cases where high ductility requirements.
Flexibility of shapes	Standard shapes are followed. High value of unit weight limits the flexibility of manufacturing wide variety of shapes.	Any desired shape can be molded out of the sheets. The light weight enhances its variety of usage.
Economy	High Unit weight increases the overall cost – material, lifting, transporting, etc. It is difficult to work with (e.g. connection).	Low unit weight reduces the cost comparatively. Ease of construction (e.g. connection).
Research possibilities	In the advanced stages at present.	More possibilities as the concept is relatively new and material finds wide variety of applications.

Annealing, also described in the earlier section, is part of the manufacturing process of cold-formed steel sheet. It is a heat treatment technique that alters the microstructure of the cold-reducing steel to recover its ductility.

== Alternative design methods ==
The Direct Strength Method (DSM) is an alternative method of design located in Appendix 1 of the North American Specification for the Design of Cold-formed Steel Structural Members 2007 (AISI S100-07). DSM may be used in lieu of the Main Specification for determining nominal member capacities. Specific advantages include the absence of effective width and iterations, while only using known gross-sectional properties. An increase in prediction confidence stems from forced compatibility between section flanges and web throughout elastic buckling analysis. This increase in prediction accuracy for any section geometry provides a solid basis for rational analysis extension and encourages cross-sectional optimization. Either DSM or the main specification can be used with confidence as the Φ or Ω factors have been designed to insure that both methods are accurate. Currently, DSM only provides solutions for beams and columns and has to be used in conjunction with the main specification for a complete design.

Rational analysis is permitted when using optimized cold form shapes that are outside of the scope of the main specification and are not pre-qualified for DSM use. These non-pre-qualified sections use the factors of safety of Φ and Ω associated with rational analysis (see AISI 2001 Section A1.1 (b)). The result of the rational analysis times the appropriate factor of safety will be used as the design strength of the section.

Several situations may exist where a rational analysis application of DSM can be used. In general these would include: (1) determining the elastic buckling values and (2) using the DSM equations in Appendix 1 to determine nominal flexural and axial capacities, Mn and Pn. The premise of DSM itself is an example of rational analysis. It uses elastic buckling results to determine the ultimate strength through the use of empirical strength curves. This provides designers with a method for performing a rational analysis in a number of unique situations.

In some cases the rational analysis extension to DSM may be as simple as dealing with an observed buckling mode that is difficult to identify and making a judgment call as to how to categorize the mode. But it could also be used to allow an engineer to include the effects of moment gradients, the influence of different end conditions, or the influence of torsion warping on all buckling modes.

There are currently no provisions within the DSM that pertain to shear, web crippling, holes in members, or strength increases due to the cold work of forming. Research on several of these topics has been completed or is in the process of being completed and should be included in the next update of the AISI Specification. DSM is also limited in determining strength for sections in which very slender elements are used. This is due to the strength of a cross section being predicted as a whole with DSM instead of using the effective width method of the specification which breaks the cross section up into several effective elements. One slender element will cause low strength with DSM, which is not the case with the current specification method. The finite strip method using CUFSM is the most commonly used approach to determine the elastic buckling loads. The program also limits DSM because holes cannot be considered, loads have to be uniform along the member, only simply supported boundary conditions are considered, and the buckling modes interact and cannot be easily distinguishable in some cases.
