= List of bridge types =

List of different types of bridges

This is a list of different types of bridges.

Type	Image
Arch bridge	
Through arch bridge	
Beam bridge (Integral beam bridge)	
Log bridge (beam bridge)	
Viaduct	
Cavity wall viaduct	
Bowstring arch	
Box girder bridge	
Cable-stayed bridge	
Cable-stayed suspension bridge hybrid	
Cantilever bridge	
Cantilever spar cable-stayed bridge	
Clapper bridge	
Covered bridge	
Girder bridge	
Continuous span girder bridge	
Integral bridge	
Extradosed bridge	
Moon bridge	
Movable bridge	
Pigtail bridge	
Plate girder bridge	
Pontoon bridge	
Rigid-frame bridge	
Roving bridge	
Segmental bridge	
Self-anchored suspension bridge	
Side-spar cable-stayed bridge	
Simple suspension bridge (Inca rope bridge)	
Step-stone bridge	
Stressed ribbon bridge	
Suspension bridge	
Transporter bridge	
Trestle bridge	
Truss arch bridge	
Truss bridge	
Vierendeel bridge	
Brown truss	
Covered bridge	
Lattice truss bridge (Town lattice truss)	
Tubular bridge	
Vlotbrug	

== Naturally occurring bridges ==
Type	Image
Ant bridge	
Root bridge	
Natural bridge	

== See also ==
- Cable-stayed suspension bridge
