= Finite strip method =

Construction Structural Analysis

The finite strip method is a technique of structural analysis used for bridge and tall structure design as well and in the design of construction components such as steel beams. The technique was first introduced in 1968 and is less powerful and versatile than the finite element method but is more efficient in terms of computation power in some situations.
