= Lexus RC =

Compact executive car

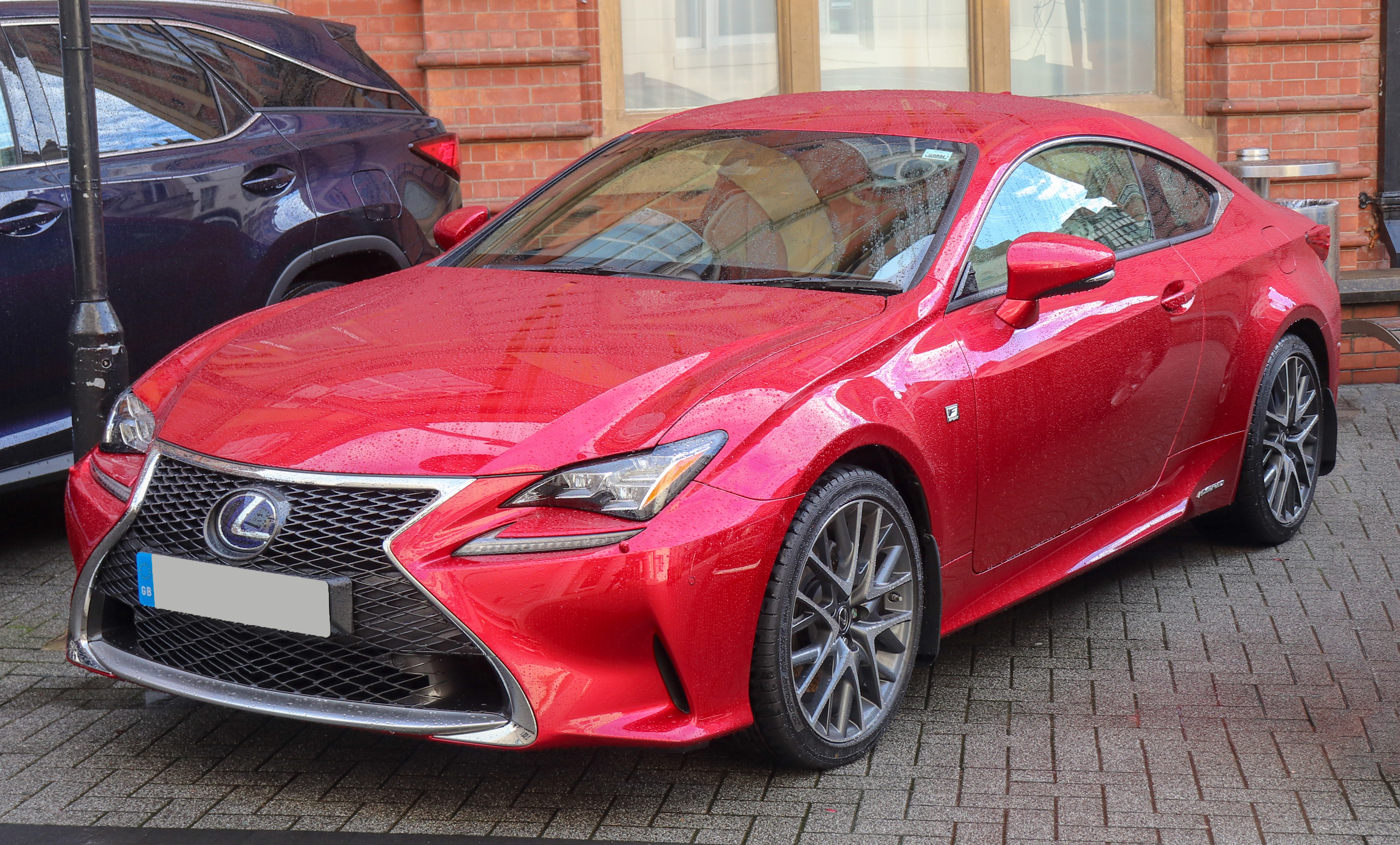
- 2018 Lexus RC 300h F Sport (AVC10, UK)

Overview
- Manufacturer: Toyota
- Model code: XC10
- Production: 2014–2025
- Model years: 2015–2025
- Assembly: Japan: Tahara, Aichi (Tahara plant)
- Designer: Pansoo Kwon (2012)

Body and chassis
- Class: Compact executive car (D)
- Body style: 2-door coupé
- Layout: Front-engine, rear-wheel-drive; Front-engine, all-wheel-drive
- Platform: Toyota New N platform
- Related: Lexus IS (XE30); Lexus GS (L10)

Powertrain
- Engine: 2.0 L 8AR-FTS I4-T (petrol, RC 200t/300); 2.5 L 2AR-FSE I4 (petrol hybrid, RC 300h); 3.5 L 2GR-FSE V6 (petrol, RC 350, 2014-2017); 3.5 L 2GR-FKS V6 (petrol, RC 350, 2018-present); 5.0 L 2UR-GSE V8 (petrol, RC F)
- Electric motor: 105 kW (141 hp; 143 PS) 1KM synchronous (RC 300h)
- Power output: 180 kW (241 hp; 245 PS) (RC 200t/300); 131 kW (176 hp; 178 PS) (RC 300h, petrol engine only); 234 kW (314 hp; 318 PS) (RC 350); 341–354 kW (457–475 hp; 464–481 PS) (RC F)
- Transmission: 8-speed automatic (petrol, RWD); 6-speed automatic (petrol, AWD); eCVT (hybrid)
- Hybrid drivetrain: Power-split

Dimensions
- Wheelbase: 2,730 mm (107.5 in)
- Length: 4,695–4,710 mm (184.8–185.4 in)
- Width: 1,840–1,845 mm (72.4–72.6 in)
- Height: 1,390–1,395 mm (54.7–54.9 in)
- Kerb weight: 1,680–1,845 kg (3,704–4,068 lb)

Chronology
- Predecessor: Lexus IS C (XE20)

The Lexus RC (Japanese: レクサス・RC, Hepburn: Rekusasu RC) is a compact executive two-door coupé manufactured by Lexus, Toyota's luxury division. The RC which according to Lexus stands for "Radical Coupe" is a two-door coupé version of the Lexus IS (XE30). The RC is designated as the XC10 series. The RC borrowed styling from the LF-LC concept and was previewed by the LF-CC concept, being designed as a proposal by Pansoo Kwon from 2010 to early 2012 and approved by supervising designers Yasuo Kajino and Tatsuya Takei.

== Overview ==
The RC was unveiled at the 2013 Tokyo Motor Show.

The RC has a shorter wheelbase than the Lexus IS (XE30) though it is longer overall. The platform shares the front end of the Lexus GS (L10), midsection from the Lexus IS (XE20) convertible, while the rear componentry is from the XE30 series IS. The RC has three LED lamps in the triangular headlights and 18-inch five-spoke alloy wheels as standard, or 19-inch ten-spoke wheels as option.

Japan models were set to go on sale in the second half of 2014. Early models include RC 350 and RC 300h. US sales began in November 2014. In Japan, ownership of the version with the 5.0 litre engine is expensive due to the annual Japanese road tax obligation.

Initially, the RC was available with a choice of three engines: the RC 300h with the 2.5-liter 2AR-FSE inline-four engine mated to a continuously variable transmission, the RC 350 with the 3.5-liter 2GR-FSE V6 (which was later replaced with the 2GR-FKS from model year 2018 on), and the RC F with 5.0-liter 2UR-GSE V8. The RC 200t (now called RC 300), featuring a 2.0-liter 8AR-FTS I4 turbocharged petrol engine, was added to the range in late 2015. All-wheel drive is offered for the RC 300h and RC 350. Lexus RC AWD versions use a full-time all-wheel drive system that utilizes a planetary gearset center differential coupled with a multi-disc clutch to act as the slip limiting device. The planetary gearset provides a 30:70 front-to-rear torque split under normal conditions for handling agility, however the system can allow for a torque split of up to 50:50 to control wheel slip.

Variants of the RC series have all-wheel steering, 2 piece brake rotors, variable suspension dampers, and a Torsen limited slip differential.

As of January 2020, the trim levels are "Version L" and "F-Sport".

The RC 350 naturally aspirated V6 produces 234 kW (314 hp; 318 PS) at 6,600 rpm and 380 N⋅m (280 lbf⋅ft) at 4,800 rpm. While comfort and luxury were the aim of the RC series, sportiness was also part of the equation, although its heavy curb weight dampens the car's performance driving capability especially against the RC's direct competitors such as the BMW 430i and Audi A5.

TRD produces a bodykit, several aerodynamic and performance parts for the RC 350, these include an exhaust system, a rear diffuser, lightweight forged aluminium wheels with Michelin Pilot Super Sport tires, etc. The options are dealer fitted and are available only in Japan.

RC 300h F Sport

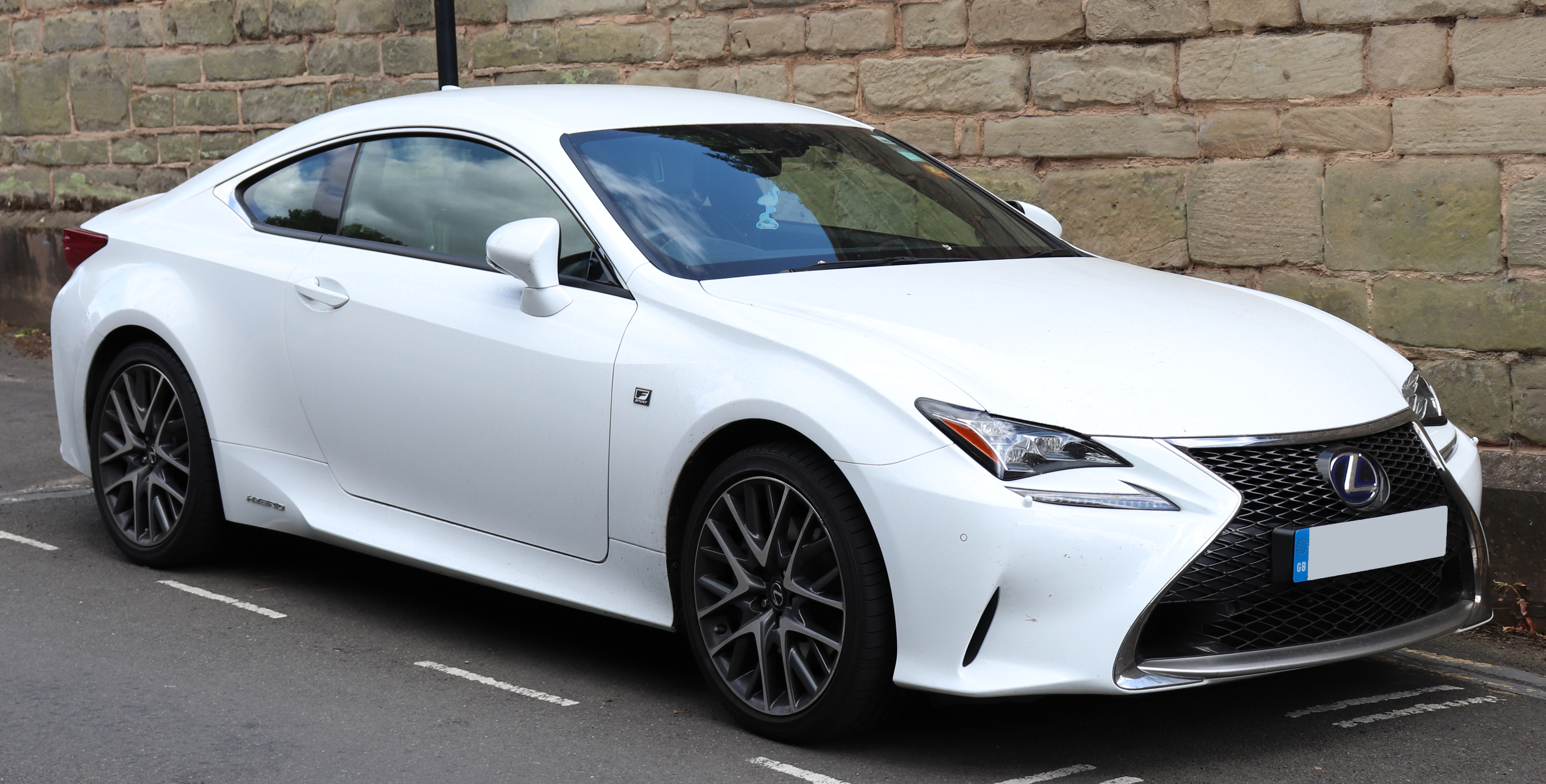
Front (AVC10; pre-facelift, UK)

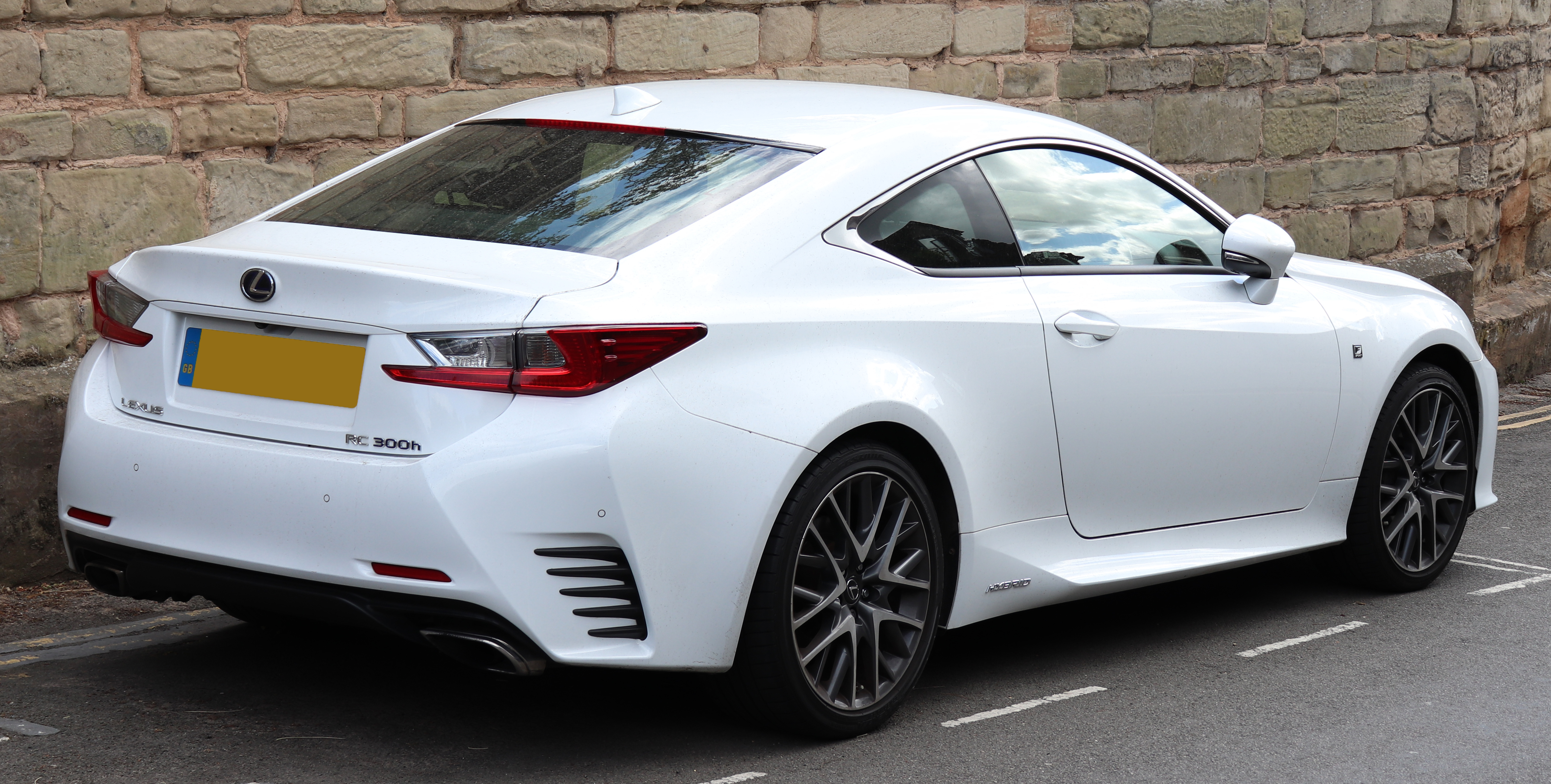
Rear (AVC10; pre-facelift, UK)

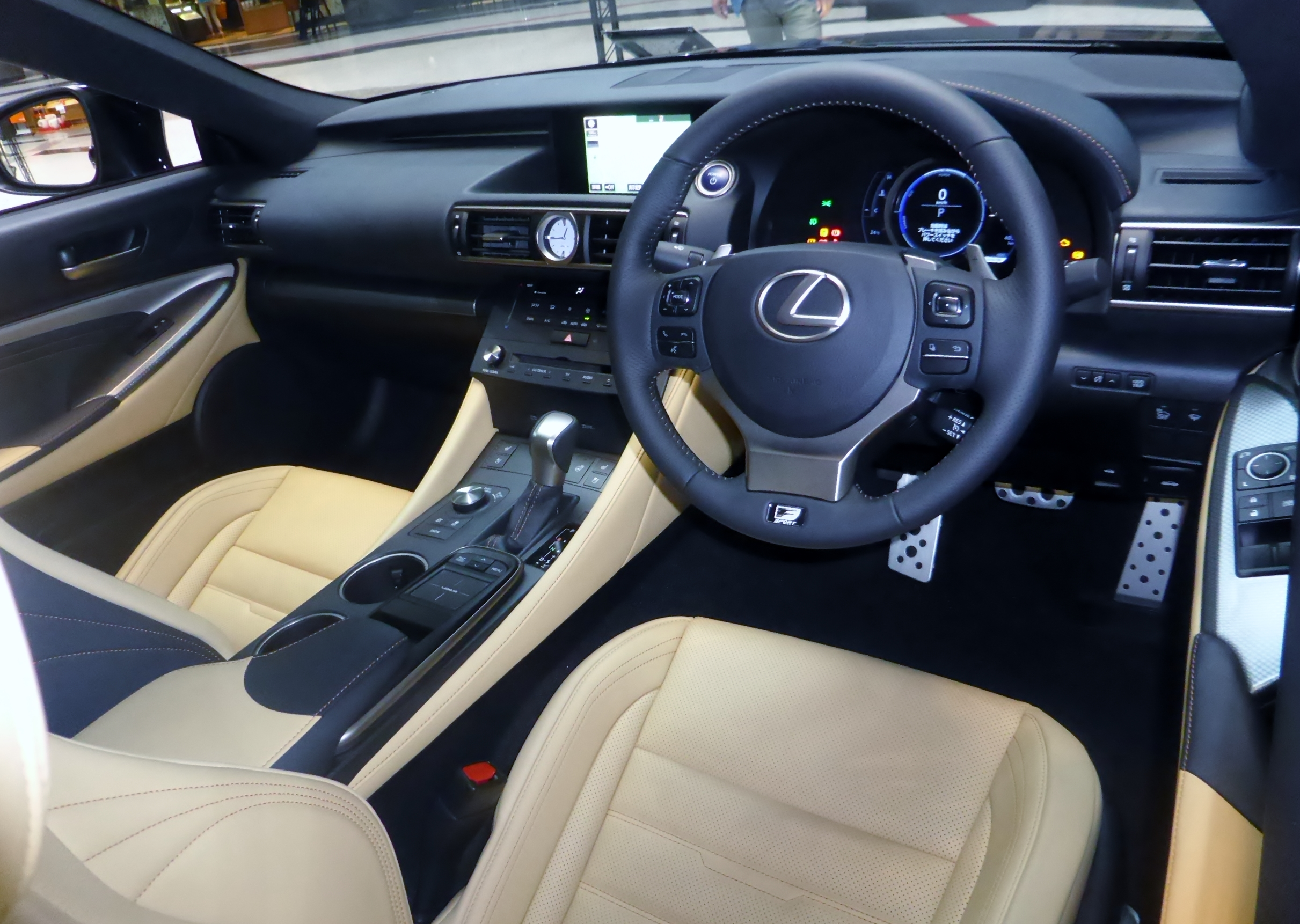
Interior (prototype)

=== Facelift ===
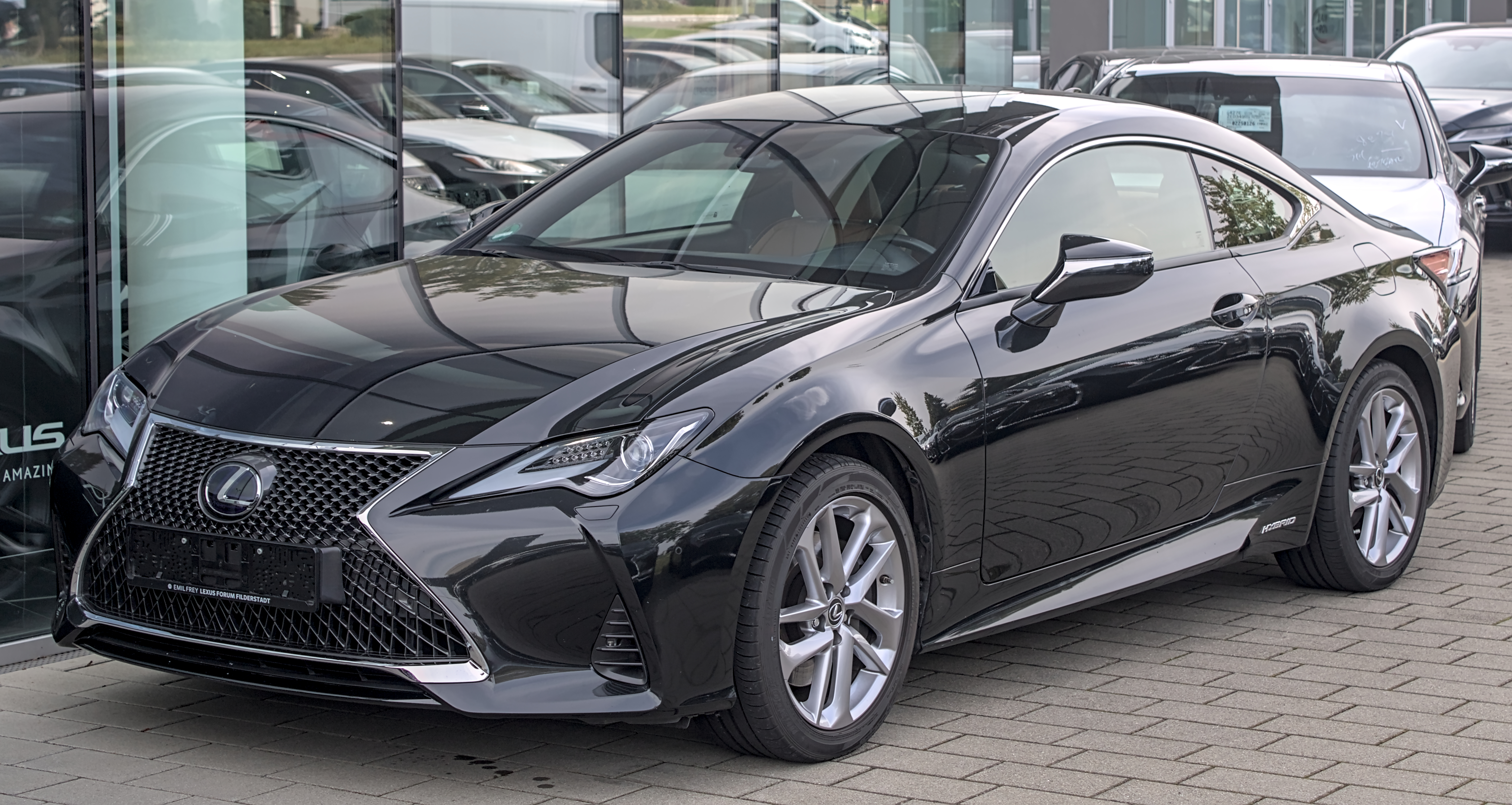

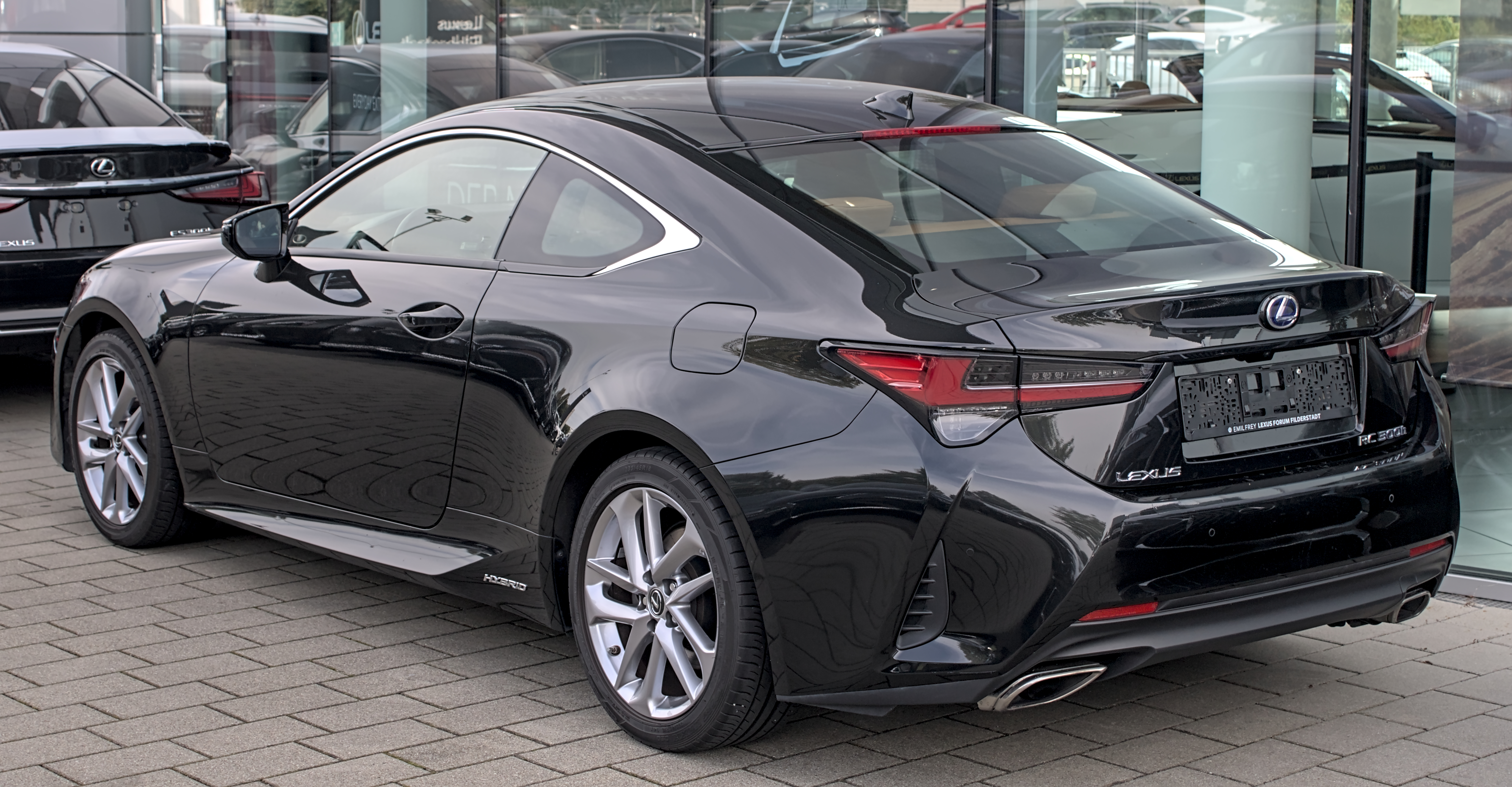
2018 Lexus RC 300h F Sport (AVC10; facelift)

The RC received its first facelift in August 2018, with official images revealed ahead of its 2018 Paris Motor Show debut, which took place a few weeks after. The corporate L-shaped DRLs and the triple eye LED's are merged, making their placements look highly reminiscent of its bigger LC coupe along with a reworked cabin and rear tail lamp design. Base models now come standard with Amazon Alexa integration and a 4G LTE Wi-Fi hotspot.

For the 2019 model year US market, the regular Lexus RC is offered as RC 300 and RC 350. Both models are available as rear wheel drive or AWD, as well as the choice of base or F Sport trim levels, which makes the total of 8 models to choose from.

In most European countries, other than the high performance RC F, only the rear wheel drive RC 300h is offered as the base, F Sport, and special edition called Takumi. The RC300 h Takumi comes with multi-spoke 19-inch alloys and a 17-speaker Mark Levinson sound system. In South Africa, the RC 350 is the base model, with the RC F as the flagship model.

The RC 350 RWD accelerates from 0–97 km/h (0–60 mph) in 5.7 seconds.

Following the introduction of stricter crash safety regulations, the RC, along with the IS sedan and the CT hatchback, were pulled out from the Australian market in November 2021.

== RC F ==
The RC F is a high performance version of the RC. The vehicle was unveiled in the 2014 North American International Auto Show. It went on sale in the United States in November 2014 as a 2015 model year vehicle. It was set to go on sale in Japan in the second half of 2014.

The RC F features a 5.0 L (4,969 cc) 2UR-GSE V8 engine with Atkinson cycle at cruising speeds, developing a maximum output of 473 PS (467 bhp; 348 kW) at 7100 rpm and 389 lb⋅ft (527 N⋅m) of torque at 4800–5600 rpm. It is coupled to a Toyota AA80E 8-speed transmission built by Aisin AW. The RC F has Brembo four-wheel power assisted disc brakes with anti-lock braking system (ABS), electronic brake force distribution (EBD) and brake assist (BA), and 255/35R19 front and 275/35R19 rear tires.

The RC F is equipped with vertical G-sensor for VDIM, rear Torsen or Torque Vectoring Differential (TVD) with three operating modes (Standard, Slalom, or Track), monotube gas-filled shock absorbers and ball-jointed stabilizer bars, new 19-inch BBS forged aluminum wheels, spindle grille with F-mesh pattern on the lower half, unique front hood which raises the peak of the vehicle, hood air vent from the LFA, front cooling ducts, front fender ducts in the L shape, exclusive combination meters from LFA (a large centrally mounted tachometer that alters according to drive mode, digital and analog speedometer, differential torque vectoring monitor, G-force meter, oil and water temperature gauges, mileage information and a stopwatch), and an elliptical cross-section thick grip steering wheel.

The aerodynamic package includes an active rear spoiler, tuning of the underbody, the intakes in the grille and the front fender vents and aero stabilizing fins.

The carbon fiber optional package, known in Japan as Carbon Exterior Package, includes a clear coated carbon fiber roof, active rear spoiler, and carbon fiber engine hood. The carbon fiber package parts for the RC F were made at the Aichi plant after the end of the LFA production.

To celebrate the 10th-anniversary of Lexus F high performance models, a limited edition RC F was released for the 2018 model year US market. All of the limited edition RC F come in matte-finished Nebula Gray paint with gloss black wheels and bright blue brake calipers. Inside they are equipped with blue leather seats, steering wheel and shift knob, blue Ultrasuede dashboard cover above the instrument cluster, and blue-silver carbon fiber power window switch panel.

Pre-facelift

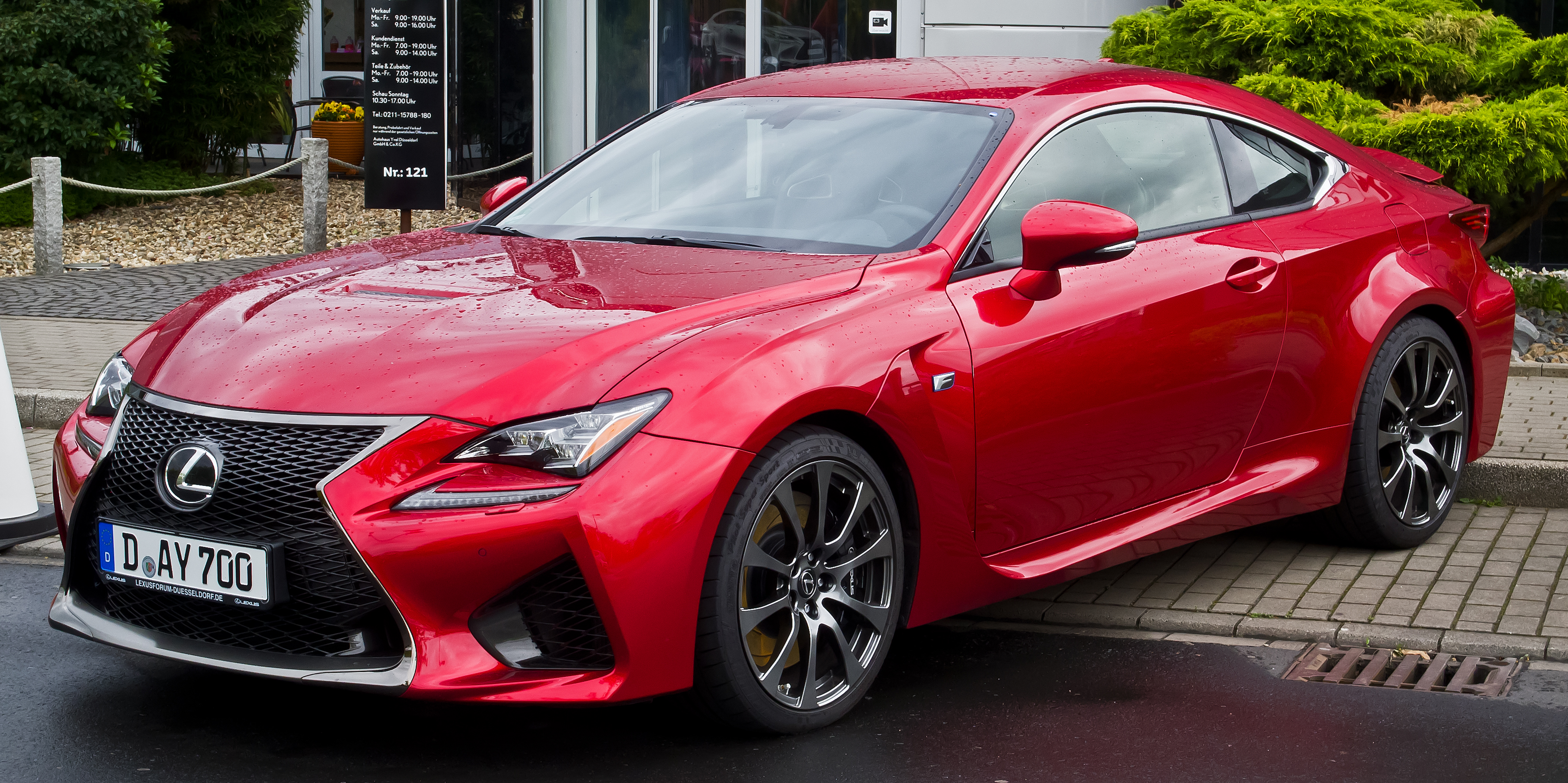
Pre-facelift 2015 Lexus RC F (USC10, Germany)

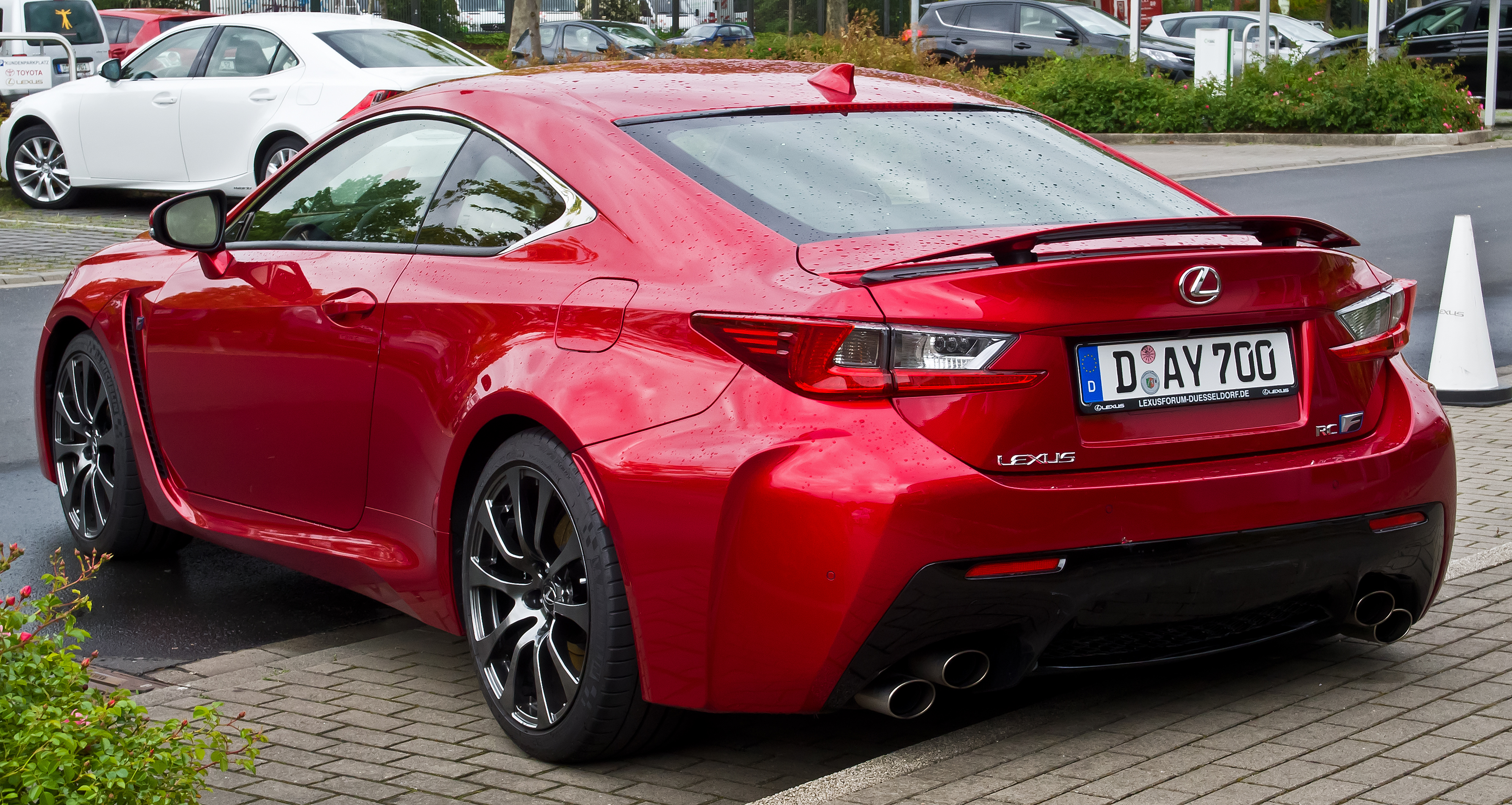
Pre-facelift 2015 Lexus RC F (USC10, Germany)

Facelift

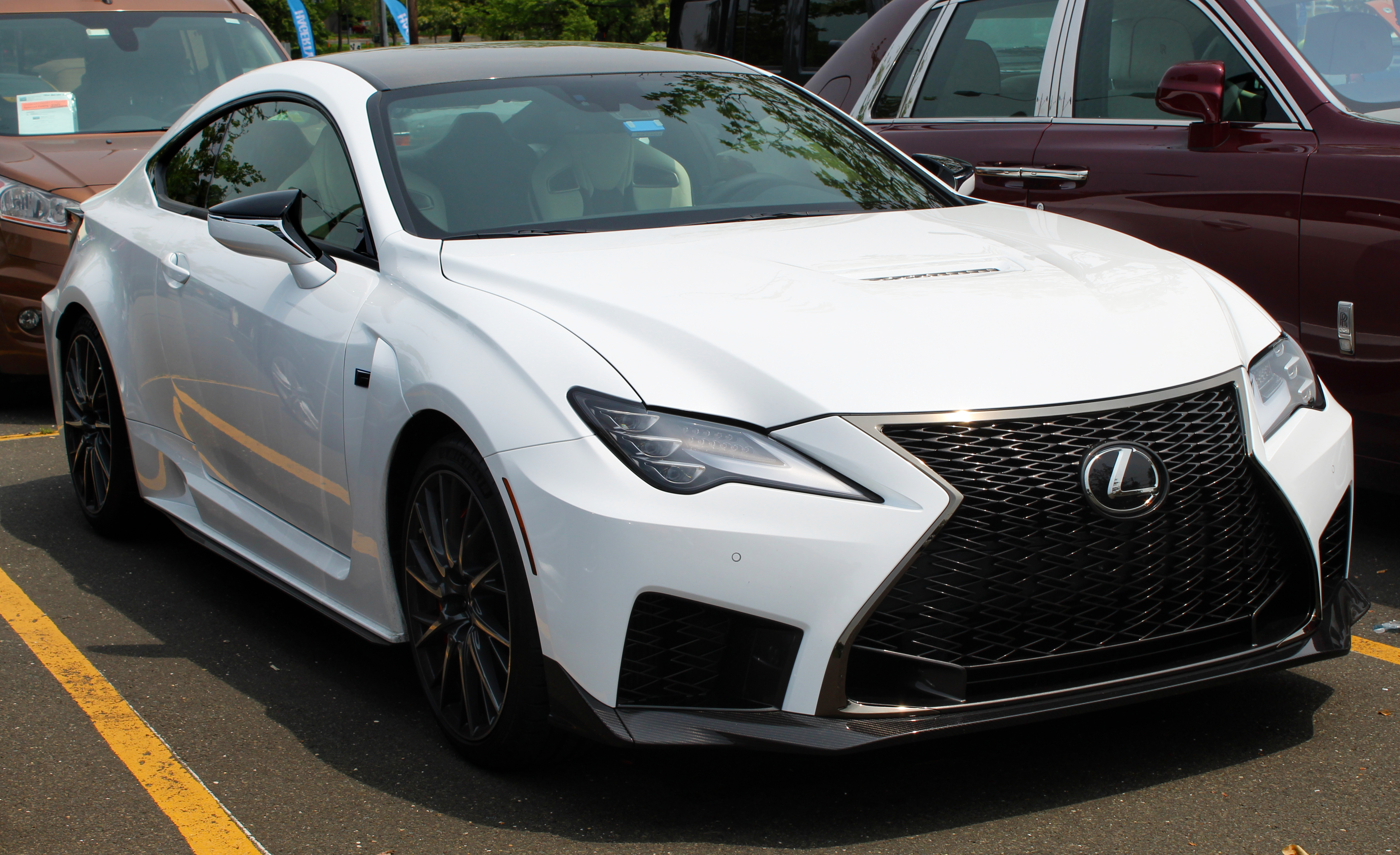
Facelift 2019 Lexus RC F (USC10, US)

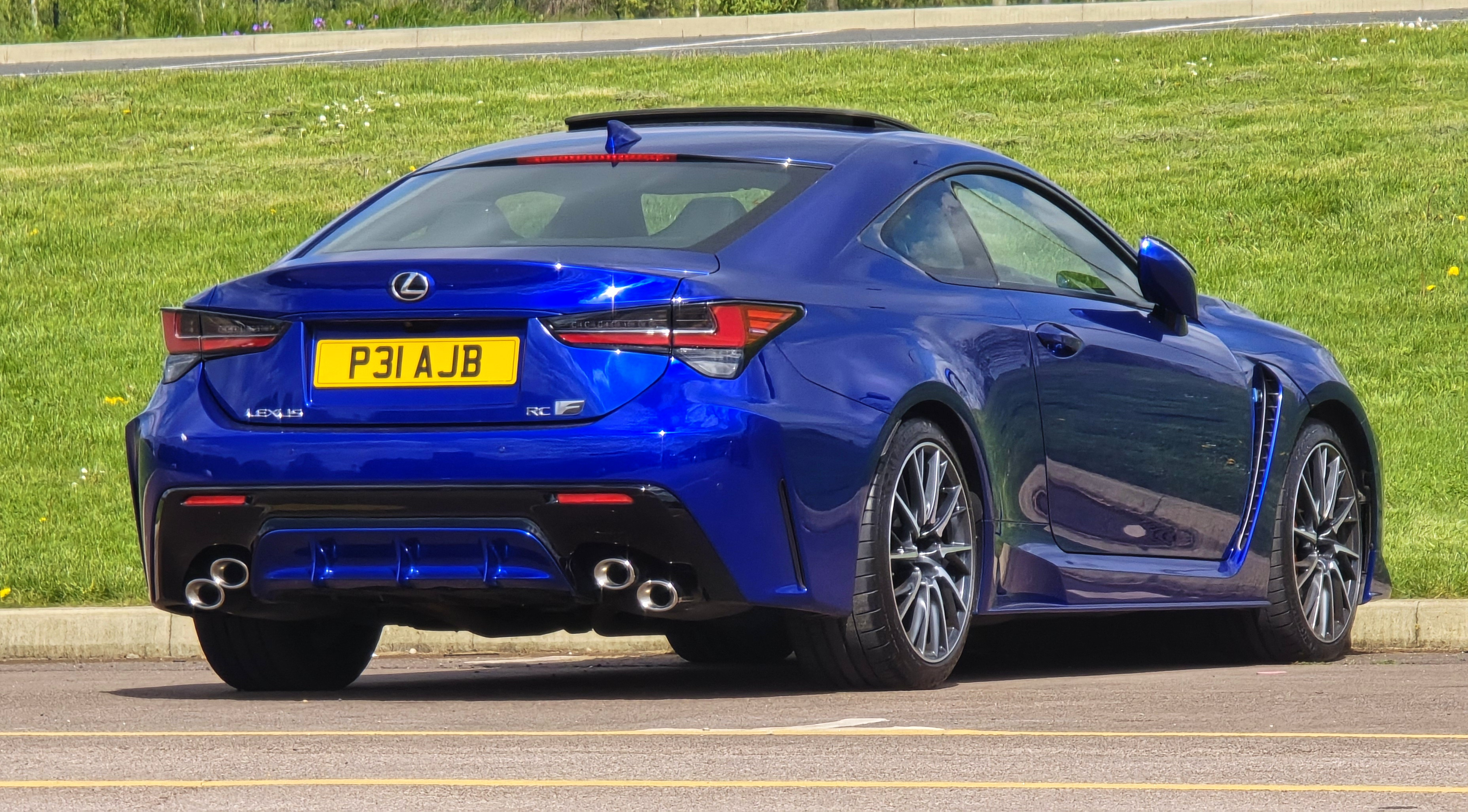
Facelift 2020 Lexus RC F (USC10, UK)

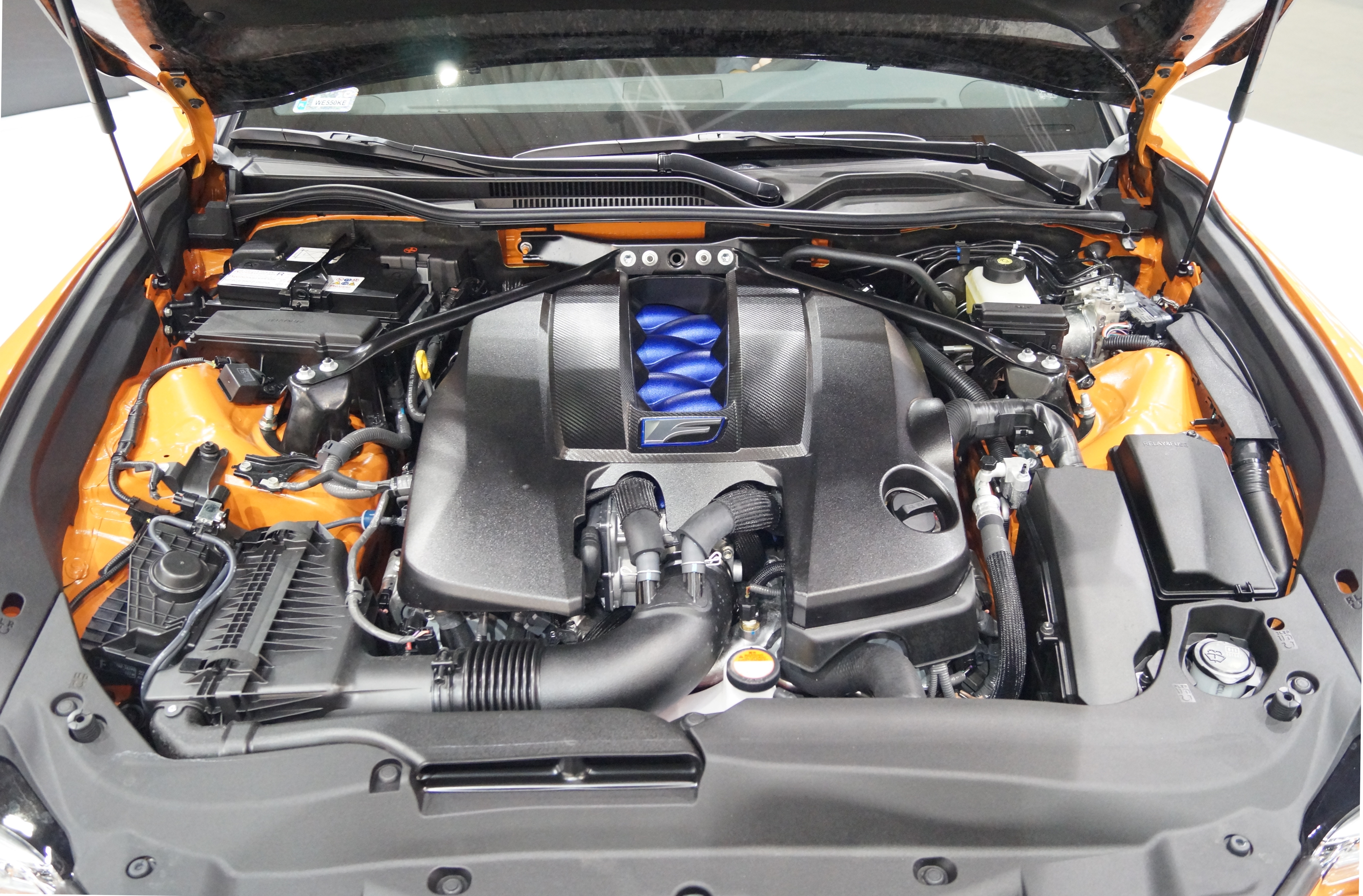
Toyota 2UR-GSE engine in a Lexus RC F

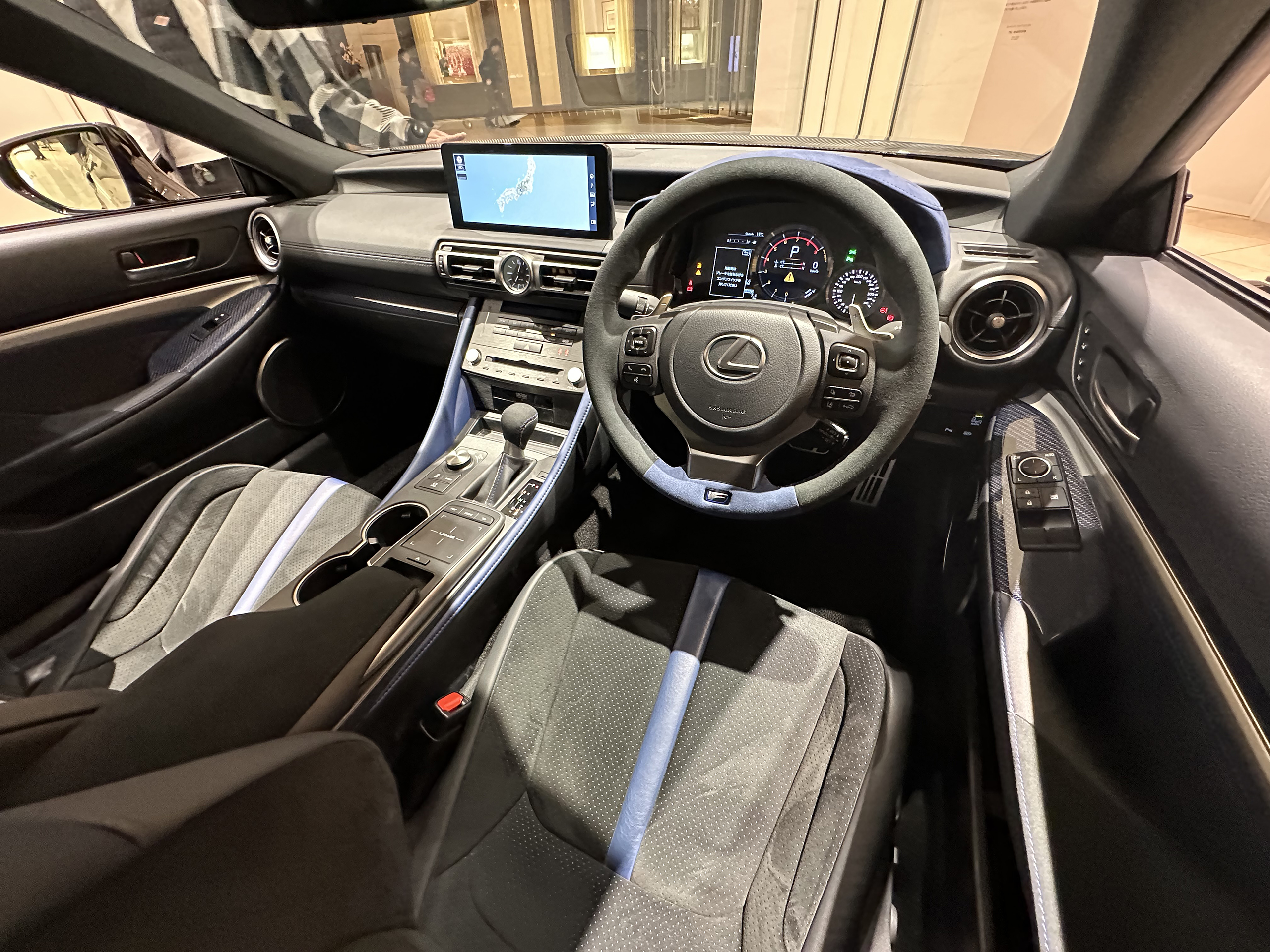
Interior of Lexus RC F Performance Package

=== RC F Track Edition/Performance Package (2019) ===
The RC F Track Edition (or Performance Package) was unveiled at the January 2019 North American International Auto Show as the track-focused variant of the RC F. It has a similar styling direction to the other updated RC models. The car features performance upgrades and weighs 80 kg (180 lb) less than the standard RC F. Weight-saving measures include lighter 19-inch wheels, carbon-ceramic brake rotors, a titanium muffler and exhaust pipes and extensive usage of carbon fiber. The Track Edition began sales in April 2019 and is available in white or matte gray with red interior color.

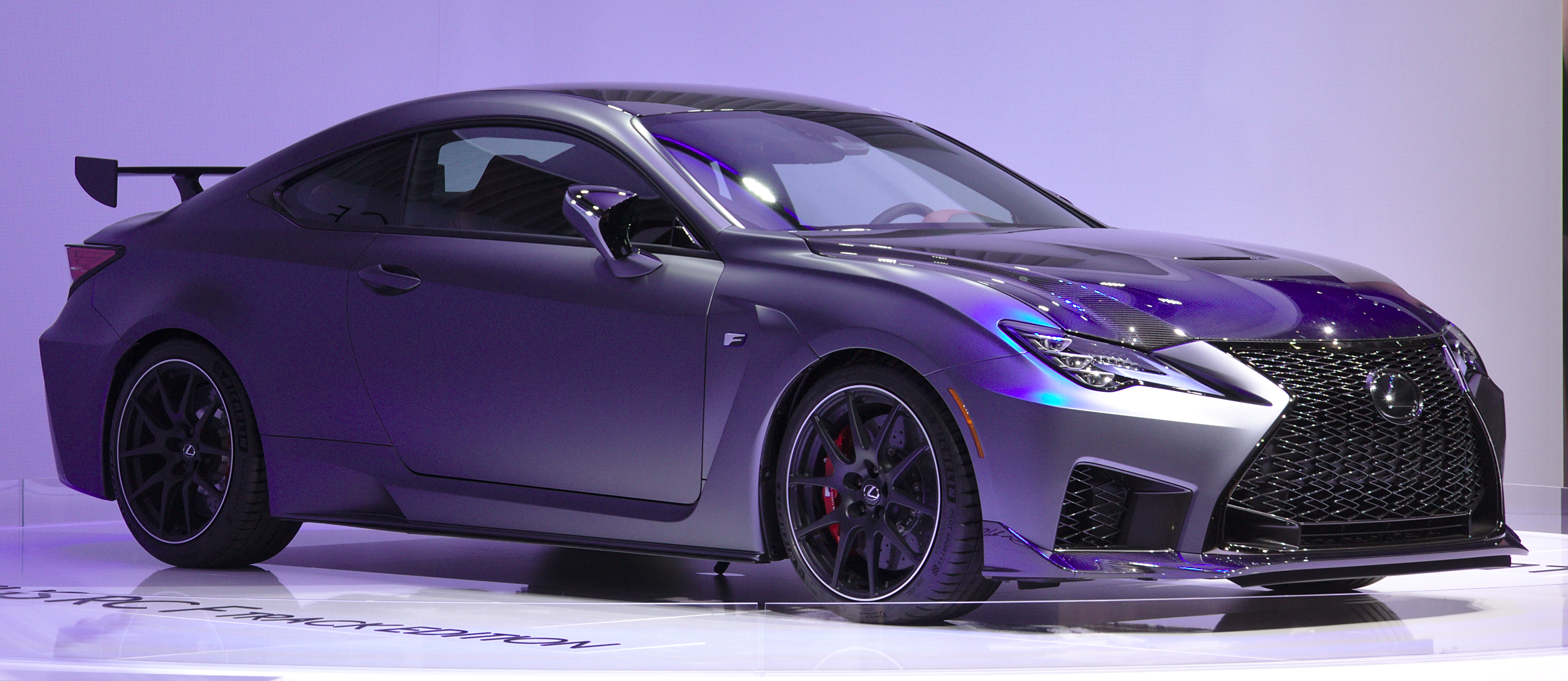
2019 RC F Track Edition (USC10)

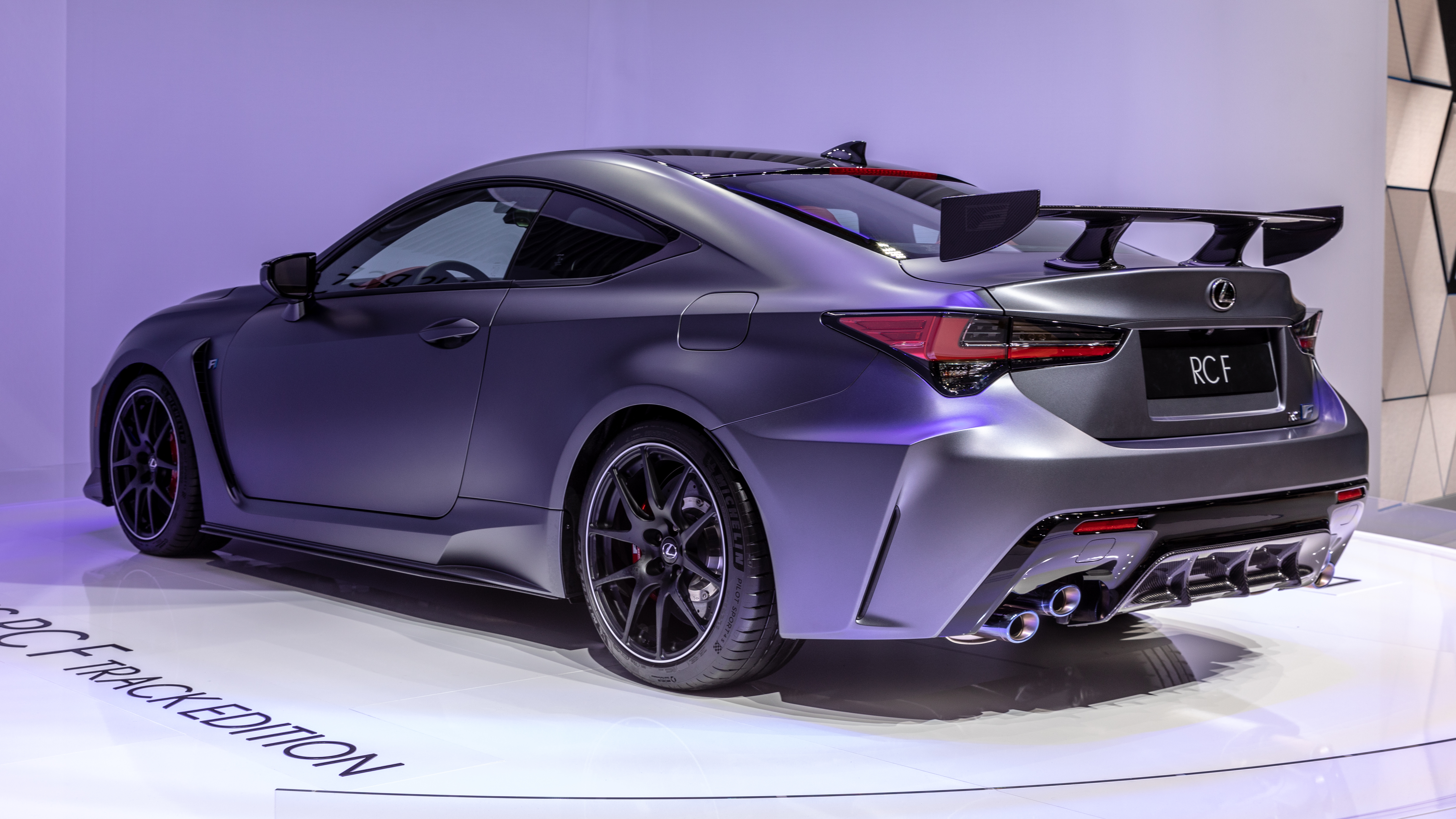
2019 RC F Track Edition (USC10)

=== RC F Final Edition (2025) ===
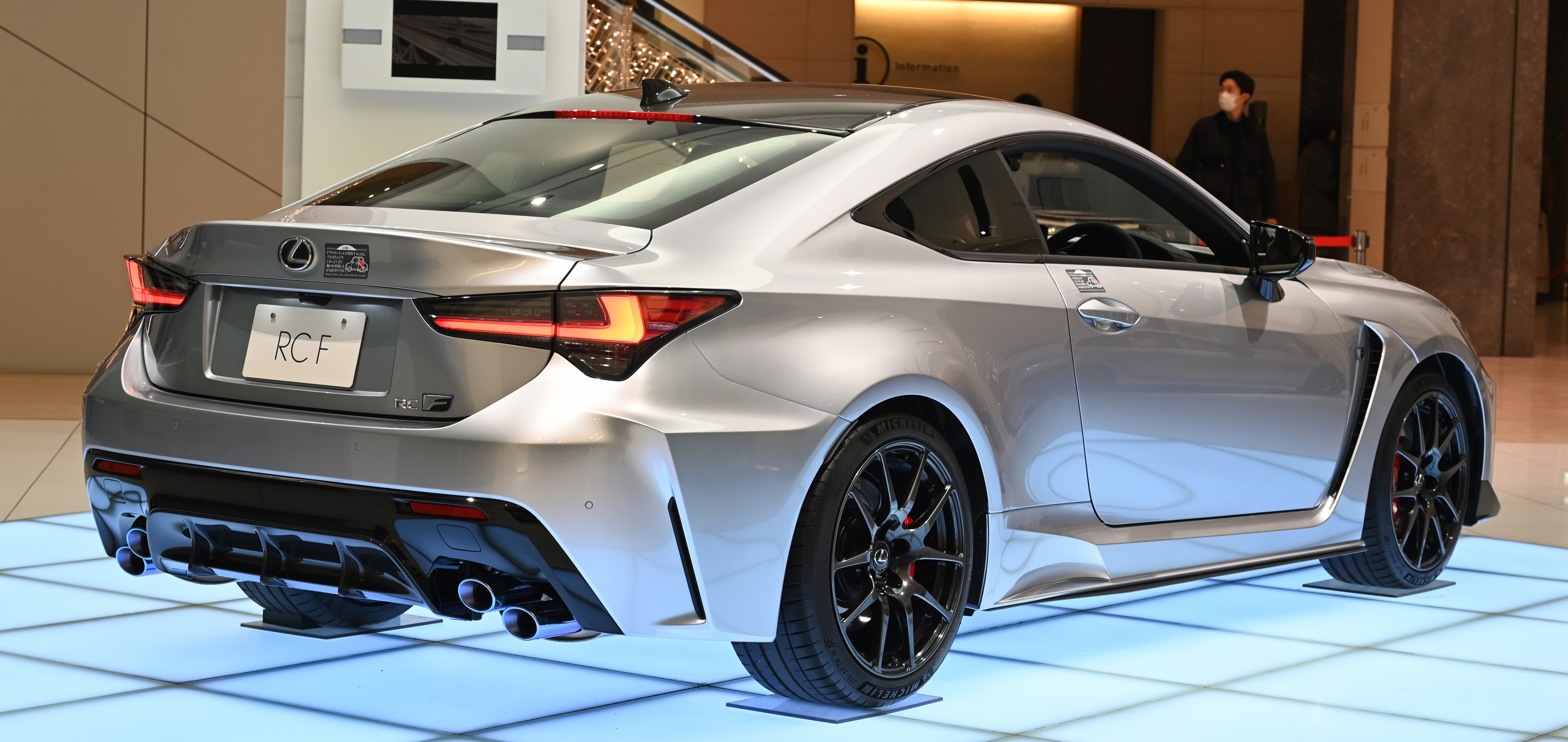
Lexus RC F Final Edition (USC10, Japan)

The RC and RC F has been discontinued in 2025, with production ending in November. The RC F received an exclusive Final Edition to sunset the RC line. The RC F Final Edition comes with features such as automatic folding mirrors, rocker panels, carbon fiber roof, triple-beam LED headlights, active rear wing, red brake calipers, 19-inch BBS alloy wheels, front spoiler, and rear diffuser as standard on the exterior, while the interior receives a 10.3-inch touchscreen, Mark Levinson premium audio system, bespoke black and red leather/Ultrasuede upholstery, and a carbon fiber Final Edition emblem featuring the limited production number fitted to the console. The RC F Final Edition comes in four colors: Radiant Red, Ultra White, Incognito, and Sonic Iridium.

== Motorsports ==
=== Super Taikyu ===
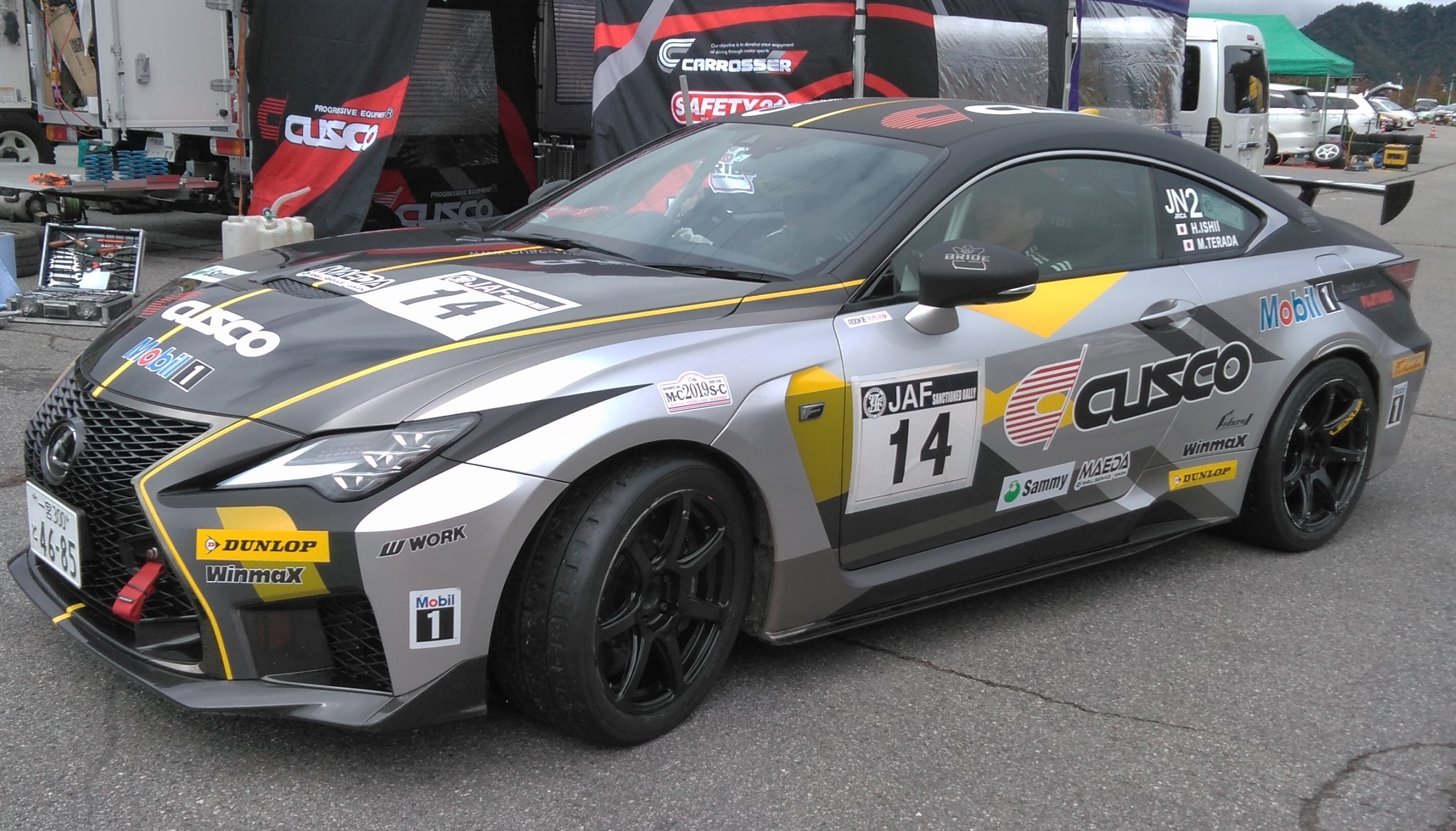
A Cusco Racing sponsored RC F

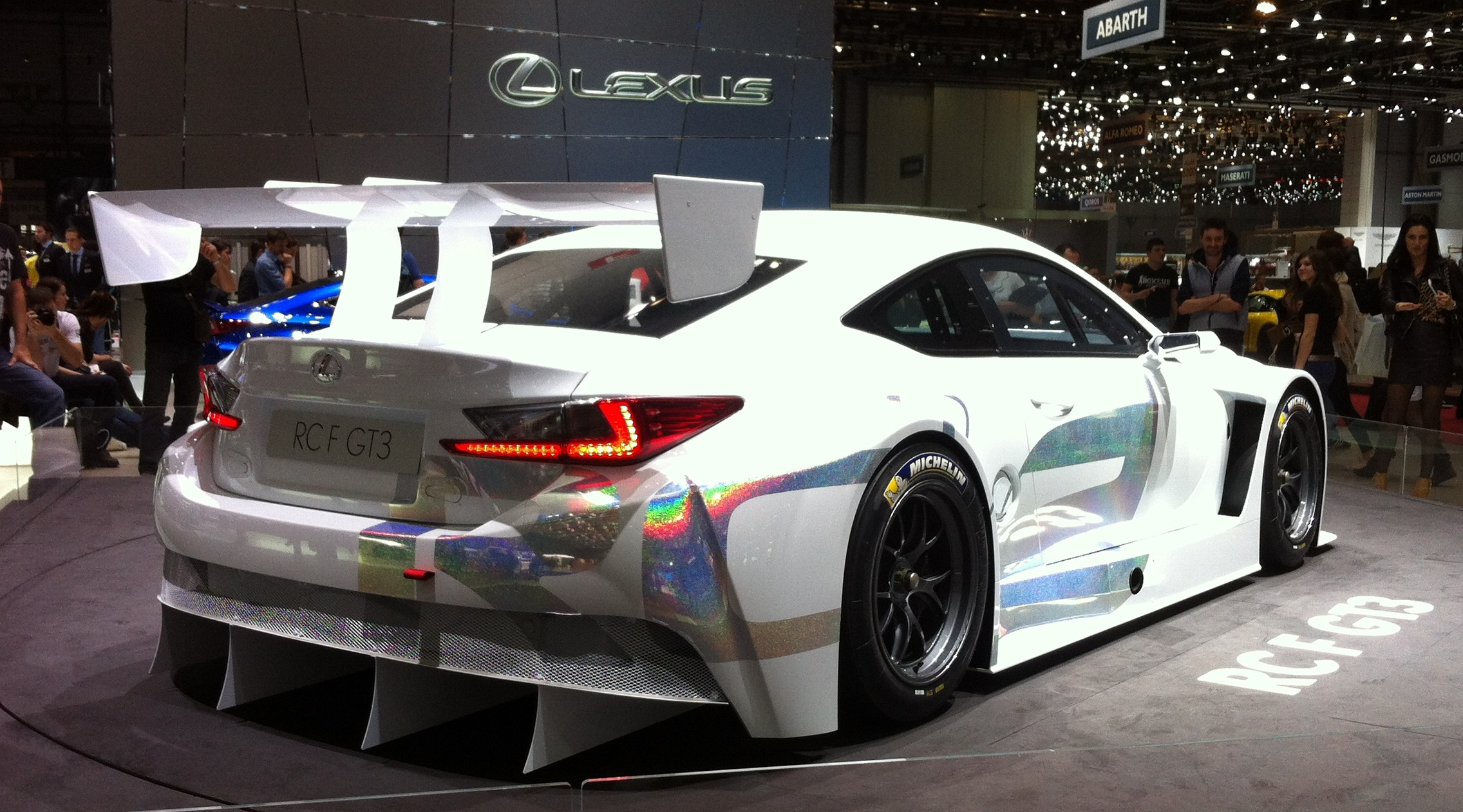
A prototype of the RC F GT3

Being fielded by SARD Racing in 2015 and then by several private teams such as Tracy Sports, the RC 350 has won several championships in Japan's Super Taikyu Endurance series under the ST-3 class. The RC F is also a popular contender.

=== VLN ===
Toyota Gazoo Racing also entered the Lexus RC alongside its siblings, the IS F and LFA, in the VLN (German: Veranstaltergemeinschaft Langstreckenpokal Nürburgring), a series of endurance races held at the Nürburgring circuit every year.

The RC utilised a modified version of its 2.0, 8AR-FTS, whereas the RC F too made use of a modified version of the 5.0 2UR-GSE. Chassis wise, the RC was closer to the production car as required by SP3T regulations.

The RC has set numerous pole positions within its class numerous times within the years, most notably with a time of 8 minutes 56 seconds at the full Nürburgring circuit in 2017, with the RC F winning its class (SPX) on the car's debut in 2015.

=== Super GT ===
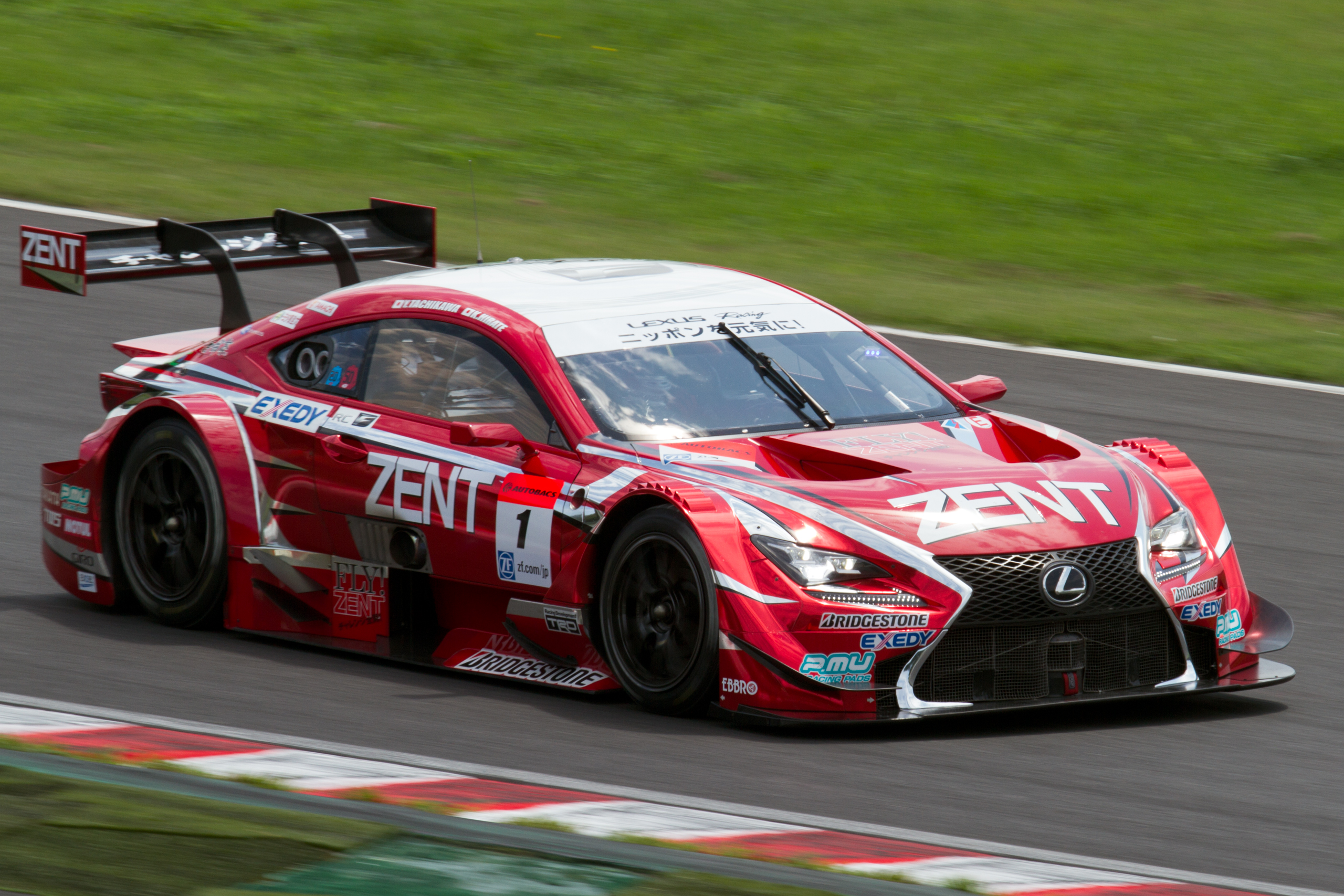
Lexus RC F GT500 Team ZENT Cerumo

The RC F has given its name to a GT500 class competitor in the Super GT series in the 2014 season, replacing the SC430 that had been raced for 7 years. In its debut season, the car scored 4 victories by Team TOM'S at Okayama, Suzuka, and Buriram and Team ZENT Cerumo at Sportsland SUGO with the new technical regulations.

In 2015, Andrea Caldarelli and Ryō Hirakawa claimed two wins, whereas Daisuke Itō and James Rossiter claimed one win. In the 2016 Super GT Series, the car claimed three wins, with Heikki Kovalainen and Kohei Hirate winning the title. The RC was replaced by the Lexus LC for the 2017 season.

=== GT3 ===
Lexus RC F GT3
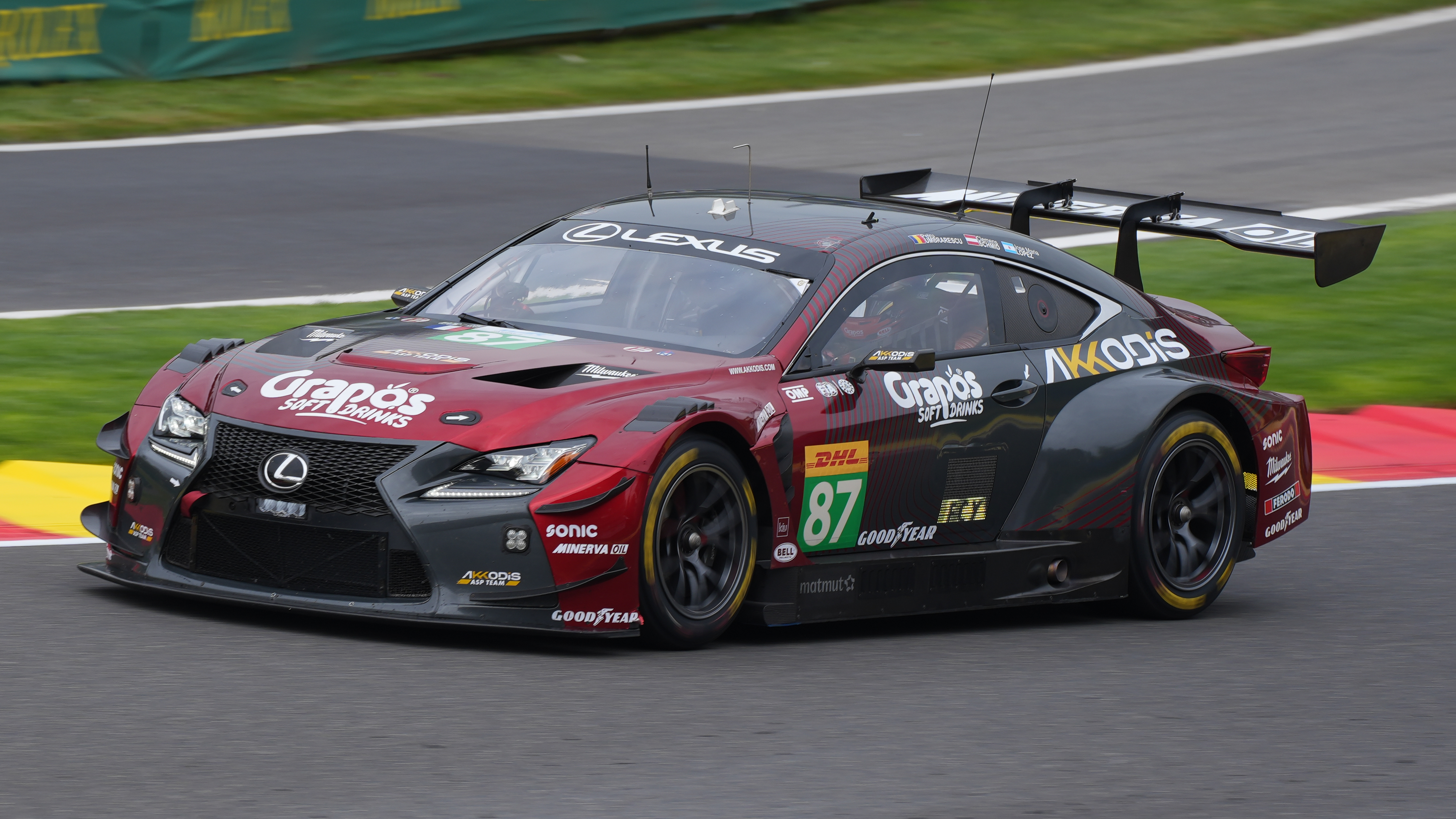
- The No. 87 RC F GT3 of Akkodis ASP Team at the 2026 6 Hours of Spa-Francorchamps
- Category: Group GT3
- Constructor: Lexus

Technical specifications
- Chassis: Carbon-fibre monocoque
- Suspension (front): Double wishbone, pushrod operated, twin dampers and torsion bars
- Suspension (rear): Double wishbone, pushrod operated, twin dampers and spring
- Length: 4,845 mm (190.7 in)
- Width: 2,030 mm (79.9 in)
- Height: 1,270 mm (50.0 in)
- Wheelbase: 2,730 mm (107.5 in)
- Engine: Re-stroked Toyota 2UR-GSE 5.4 L (330 cu in) V8 normally-aspirated front engined, longitudinally mounted
- Transmission: 6-speed sequential semi-automatic gearbox
- Power: Over 373 kW (507 PS; 500 hp)
- Weight: 1,300 kg (2,866 lb)
- Fuel: VP Racing Fuels
- Lubricants: Mobil 1
- Brakes: Hydraulic ventilated iron discs. AP Racing calipers
- Tyres: Continental ExtremeContact

Competition history
- Notable entrants: (United States) 3GT Racing; (United States) Vasser Sullivan Racing; (France) Akkodis ASP Team; (Japan) K-tunes Racing; (Japan) Anest Iwata Racing
- Notable drivers: (United States) Sage Karam; (United States) Scott Pruett; (United Kingdom) Ben Barnicoat; (United Kingdom) Jack Hawksworth; (United States) Robert Alon; (Austria) Dominik Baumann; (Canada) Kyle Marcelli; (Denmark) David Heinemeier Hansson; (United States) Townsend Bell; (United States) Frank Montecalvo; (United States) Richard Heistand; (United States) Parker Chase; (United States) Kyle Kirkwood; (United States) Aaron Telitz; (Canada) Parker Thompson
- Debut: 2017 24 Hours of Daytona
- First win: 2018 Sports Car Challenge of Mid-Ohio (IMSA); 2025 6 Hours of São Paulo (WEC)
- Last win: 2026 Chevrolet Grand Prix (IMSA); 2025 8 Hours of Bahrain (WEC)
- Last event: 2026 Michelin GT Challenge at VIR (IMSA); 2026 Lone Star Le Mans (WEC)
Races	Wins	Poles	F/Laps
35	4	6	9
- Teams' Championships: 1 (2023 IMSA SCC)
- Constructors' Championships: 1 (2023 IMSA SCC)
- Drivers' Championships: 1 (2023 IMSA SCC)

In 2014, Lexus unveiled the RC F GT3 concept, a racing version of the RC F developed by Lexus and in-house motorsport tuning subsidiary Technocraft for participation the Group GT3 category. It was unveiled at the 2014 Geneva International Motor Show. The Lexus was officially homologated for GT3 competition in 2017, after a few models had competed in the Super GT GT300 class and the SP-X class of VLN.

It competed for four years in the Blancpain GT Series and GT World Challenge Europe with Emil Frey Racing and Tech 1 Racing until 2020, when competition with the RC F GT3 in Europe ended after Lexus withdrew their European customer support that year. The car has also competed in the IMSA SportsCar Championship since 2017, taking the GTD Pro Manufacturers' title in 2023 with Vasser Sullivan Racing, and currently competes in the 2026 FIA World Endurance Championship in the LMGT3 class with Akkodis ASP Team. The RC F GT3 also races domestically in Super GT and Super Taikyu Series.

As of 2026, it is one of the longest serving GT3 race cars, having raced for a total of ten years since its debut. It is set to be replaced by the Toyota GR GT3.

== Sales ==
Calendar year	US sales	Canadian sales
2014	1,922	78
2015	14,784	792
2016	11,165	526
2017	7,363	512
2018	3,358	321
2019	4,591	305
2020	3,808	
2021	2,987	
2022	2,648	
2023	1,752	
2024	1,854	
2025	1,349	
