= Etihad Rail =

National railway company of the United Arab Emirates

- الاتحاد للقطارات
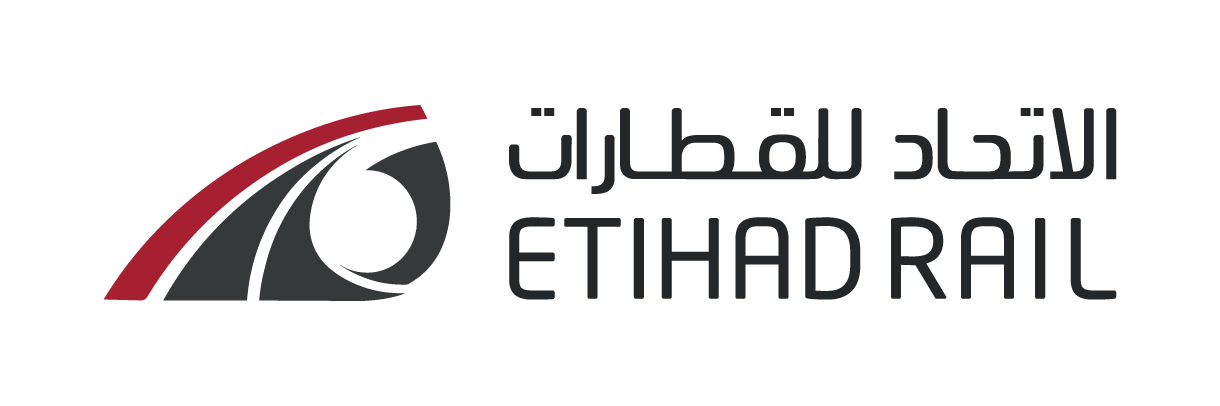

Overview
- Headquarters: 6 Al Multaqa Street, Abu Dhabi, United Arab Emirates
- Key people: Theyab bin Mohamed bin Zayed Al Nahyan (chairman); Mattar Al Tayer (vice chairman); Shadi Malak (CEO)
- Locale: United Arab Emirates
- Dates of operation: June 2009–present
- Owner: Federal government of the United Arab Emirates

Technical
- Track gauge: 1,435 mm (4 ft 8 1/2 in) standard gauge
- Length: 900 km (559 mi)

Other
- Website: etihadrail.ae

Etihad Rail (Arabic: الاتحاد للقطارات) is the developer and operator of the United Arab Emirates' national railway network. It was established in June 2009 under Federal Law No. 2 to manage the development, construction and operation of the UAE's national freight and passenger railway network. Etihad Rail connects the UAE's principal ports and centres of industry, and would link these centres with other railways throughout the Gulf Cooperation Council.

Etihad Rail is being developed in line with the Abu Dhabi Economic Vision 2030 and the UAE Vision 2021, which in turn contributes to economic diversification through strategic initiatives set to bolster UAE socio-economic growth and diversification.

Commercial operations of Stage One commenced in January 2016, on time and within budget. The operator of Stage One was Etihad Rail DB, which was a joint venture between Etihad Rail and Deutsche Bahn, Europe's largest railway operator, which was set up in 2013. In 2022, Etihad Rail moved to a self-operating model after concluding knowledge transfer programme with Deutsche Bahn.

Operations of Stage Two commenced in February 2023, thus extending the total network of Etihad Rail to 900 km.

As of 2026, both passenger and freight services are operational, with passenger services having commenced on 30 June 2026, with the inaugural route connecting Abu Dhabi's Mohamed bin Zayed City station to Al Hilal City in Fujairah. Subsequent station opened at Jumeirah Golf Estates (Dubai) and Al Dhaid (Sharjah) on 30 September 2026, Al Dhafra on 30 December 2026, and Sharjah's University City on 30 March 2027.

== History ==
In 2004, the six countries of the Gulf Cooperation Council commissioned a feasibility study regarding a railway network spanning the region. Etihad Rail was founded in June 2009 following the passage of Federal Law No. 2.

=== Stage One ===
264 km (164 mi) long Stage One of Etihad Rail connecting the inland gas fields of Liwa and Shah to the port town of Ruwais, became operational in January 2016.

=== Stage Two ===
Construction of 605 kilometres (376 mi) long on Stage Two, which runs from Ghuweifat, on the border of Saudi Arabia, to Fujairah, on the UAE's eastern coast, began in 2020. The first track for Stage Two was laid in early 2021. Stage Two opened on 28 February 2023.

== Governance ==
Name	Title
Sheikh Theyab bin Mohamed bin Zayed Al Nahyan	Chairman
Mattar Al Tayer	Board Member
Mohamed Ali Al Shorafa	Board Member
Mohammed Saeed Al Dhanhani	Board Member
Saeed Rashid Al Yateem	Board Member
Hassan Juma Al Mansouri	Board Member
Salah Bin Butti Al Muhairi	Board Member
Mansour Mohamed AlMulla	Board Member
Butti Al Mheiri	Youth Representative

== Network ==
Etihad Rail Network

=== Overview ===
The network, when complete, will be approximately 1,200 kilometres (750 mi) in length, will connect all seven of its emirates, and will link the UAE to the KSA via Ghuweifat in the west running to Fujairah on the east coast. The network will use diesel traction, with the potential to electrify in the future.

Etihad Rail's freight trains will reach speeds up to 120 km/h (75 mph), and its passenger trains will reach speeds up to 200 km/h (120 mph).

The network will use standard gauge, mainly double track, be designed for mixed-use traffic, use a European signaling system (ETCS level 2), and have heavy haul 32.5 tonnes axle loads and the loading gauge on the track accommodates double stack containers.

=== Stage One: Shah – Habshan – Ruwais (operational) ===
Etihad Rail completed Stage One of the network in January 2016, delivered on schedule and within budget. The route spans 264 km (164 mi), transporting granulated sulphur from sources at Shah and Habshan to the processing and export point at Ruwais. It currently has the capacity to transport 22,000 tonnes of granulated sulphur each day.

The operator of Stage One was Etihad Rail DB, which was a joint venture between Etihad Rail and Deutsche Bahn, Europe's largest railway operator, which was set up in 2013. Etihad Rail DB was responsible for the operations and maintenance of Stage One of the railway network for Etihad Rail's primary customer, the Abu Dhabi National Oil Company.

In 2022, Etihad Rail moved to a self-operating model after concluding knowledge transfer programme with Deutsche Bahn, with this, the Etihad Rail DB was dissolved.

Stage One utilises seven locomotives from U.S.-based Electro-Motive Diesel, equipped with the ETCS Level 2 in-cab European signalling system and international standard safety features. In addition, it is operating with up to 110 wagons per run, equipped with safety features including ECPB brakes and derailment protection.

=== Stage Two: Ghuweifat – Fujairah (operational) ===
Stage Two opened on February 28, 2023. It extends 605 kilometres (376 mi) from Ghuwaifat on the border with Saudi Arabia to Fujairah on the east coast.

Stage Two PMC & Engineering Contracts were awarded in 2018 to Egis Group and Jacobs Solutions respectively, for development and supervision of the next phase from Ghuwaifat in the west to Fujairah on the east coast.

Package A running for 139 kilometres (86 mi) from Ghuwaifat to Ruwais (where the route links with Stage One of the network), became the first rail connection between the UAE and Saudi Arabia. Contracts for the Design and Build of Package A were awarded to a joint venture between the China State Construction Engineering Corporation and South Korea's SK Engineering and Construction.

Packages B and C of the network, which connect Stage One to Abu Dhabi and Dubai, were awarded to a joint venture between the China Railway Construction Corporation and the Ghantoot Transport & General Contracting Company. Package B linked with Stage One at Tarif and run for 216 kilometres (134 mi) to Saih Shuaib and Package C from Saih Shuaib to Sharjah runs for 94 kilometres (58 mi) with a spur connection to Jebel Ali.

Package D, running for 145 kilometres (90 mi), connected to the port of Fujairah in continuation of Stage Two Package C from the Dubai/Sharjah Border, passing through the Emirates of Sharjah, Fujairah and Ras al-Khaimah. The contract for Package D was awarded to a joint venture of the China Railway Construction Corporation and National Projects and Construction, NPC. Package D included the construction of 35 bridges to span road systems, valleys and wadis, 32 underpasses and 15 tunnels, totaling 16 kilometres (9.9 mi), through the Al Hajar Mountains using blast-tunneling technology.

A systems and integration contract was awarded to Hitachi Rail STS for the supply of European Rail Traffic Management System technology and related equipment across the network. A freight facilities contract was awarded to a joint venture of Larsen & Toubro and Power China International, to construct freight facilities for the railway network. Under the terms of the contract, the two companies were jointly responsible for the surveying, design, construction, equipment installation, testing and pre-commissioning of each facility. Etihad Rail built a series of freight facilities in Ruwais, Industrial City of Abu Dhabi (ICAD), Khalifa Port, Dubai Industrial City, Jebel Ali Port, Al Ghayl & Fujairah Port capable of undertaking all loading and unloading operations, in addition to providing container storage and maintenance.

Progress Rail was contracted to design, manufacture, test, and ship 38 EMD locomotives specially designed to withstand the high temperatures and humidity of the gulf region. Additionally, the locomotives are equipped with a state-of-the-art air filtration system that filters sand from the air intake and pulse cleaning systems, ensuring effective and efficient operations.

A contract for an operations and management facility in Al Faya was awarded to a joint venture led by Vinci Construction France. The facility is the largest facility for the network; it is responsible for warehousing, installations, operations, and the maintenance of locomotives and wagons.

=== Stage 3: Dubai – Fujairah – Ras al-Khaimah (planned) ===
Stage 3 will connect Dubai to the northern Emirates of Fujairah and Ras al-Khaimah. The total track length will be 279 kilometres (173 mi). There is no current timeline for this expansion.

=== Dubai – Abu Dhabi, high speed (operational) ===
In 2025, Etihad Rail announced a new 150-km high-speed train line between Abu Dhabi and Dubai. It will connect the two cities in 30 minutes, reaching speeds of up to 350 km/h. The line is expected to be operational by 2030. It was started on 30 September, 2026.

== Abroad ==
In April 2024, Etihad Rail and Oman Rail announced a new joint venture, Hafeet Rail, that will construct 300 km (190 mi) of new railway to connect the Etihad Rail network at Abu Dhabi with the port of Sohar, Oman, passing through Al Ain.

In 2026, Paraguay signed a memorandum of understanding with Etihad Rail to build a 44-km train line between Asunción and Ypacaraí.

== Rolling Stock ==
=== Diesel-electric trainsets ===
Class	Image	Top speed		Number	Remarks	Built
Class	Image	km/h	mph	Number	Remarks	Built
Etihad Rail CAF push–pull train		200	124		Diesel-electric trainsets with 2 locomotive-like power cars and trailer cars seating 369 passengers.	
Etihad Rail CRRC push–pull train		200	124		Diesel-electric trainsets with 2 locomotive-like power cars and trailer cars seating 365 passengers.	

=== Diesel locomotives ===
Class	Image	Top speed		Number	Remarks	Built
Class	Image	km/h	mph	Number	Remarks	Built
EMD SD70ACS				45		2013–2020

== Impact ==
=== Geopolitical ===
Etihad Rail aims to provide transportation links between the UAE and its Gulf Cooperation Council neighbors, and Stage Two of the railway is planned to connect to the border of Saudi Arabia. Etihad Rail is part of the wider GCC Railway network that would connect all six Gulf Cooperation Council countries together.

=== Political ===
A senior fellow at the Middle East Institute suggested that the progress on the project has been stunted by a high degree of sovereignty maintained by the UAE's individual emirates. They suggested that this struggle reflected the relatively new concept of national centralization of political power.

=== Environmental ===
According to Etihad Rail, one fully laden freight train trip on Stage One can replace approximately 300 trucks on the road, resulting in approximately 70-80% less CO_{2} emissions than trucks moving the same tonnage. Rail transport lowers the cost of trade and improves the market position of existing industries, promoting their growth and leading to economic diversification through the creation of a new transport infrastructure and its related ecosystem.

Based on traffic volume forecasts, the Etihad Rail network will reduce greenhouse gases by more than 2.2 million tonnes annually: the equivalent of taking up to 375,000 vehicles off the roads.

The cost savings made by businesses that transfer their freight via rail will enable them to be more commercially successful and therefore contribute more to economic growth.

Estimated total benefits of emissions savings, accounting for truck freight and passengers moving from road to rail, is approximately AED24Bn over the next 50 years.

=== Social ===
The railway will connect rural areas to cities, improving connectivity and generating wider economic benefits for these areas.

Etihad Rail projects the value of time saved for road users who will shift to the rail network, will amount to 10 billion Dirham over 40 years.

Etihad Rail also projects a reduction in rates of automotive accidents on the country's roads due to this shift to rail, estimating that the rail will result in 670 fewer crashes and 52 fewer deaths annually. They project that these impacts will amount to benefits totalling 20 billion Dirham over 40 years.

=== Economic ===
Etihad Rail's website suggests that its railway will provide 186 billion Dirham in economic benefits over the course of 40 years, factoring in elements such as reduced transportation costs, as well as faster transportation times, lower emission impacts, and increased tourism generation.

Cargo, whether intermodal, bulk or break-bulk, can often be carried on rail at rates which are more competitive than other means of transport. Rail is part of the overall infrastructure development program in the UAE and will stimulate economic growth in the UAE and support the diversification of the economy.

The increase in land value of areas around rail stations will lead to revenue from leasing of potential residential, commercial and industrial developments, with a potential enhanced land value of AED23Bn over the next 50 years.

Etihad Rail estimates that its railway will generate an estimated 21 billion Dirham in tourism revenues over 40 years.

Etihad Rail also estimates that its railway will result in fewer trips via road, reducing the need for road maintenance, resulting in road maintenance costs being reduced by 7 billion Dirham over 40 years.

== See also ==
- Transport in the United Arab Emirates
- Rail transport in the United Arab Emirates
- Railway stations in the United Arab Emirates
- Abu Dhabi Developmental Holding Company
