= Electronically controlled brake =

Brake-by-wire braking system by Toyota

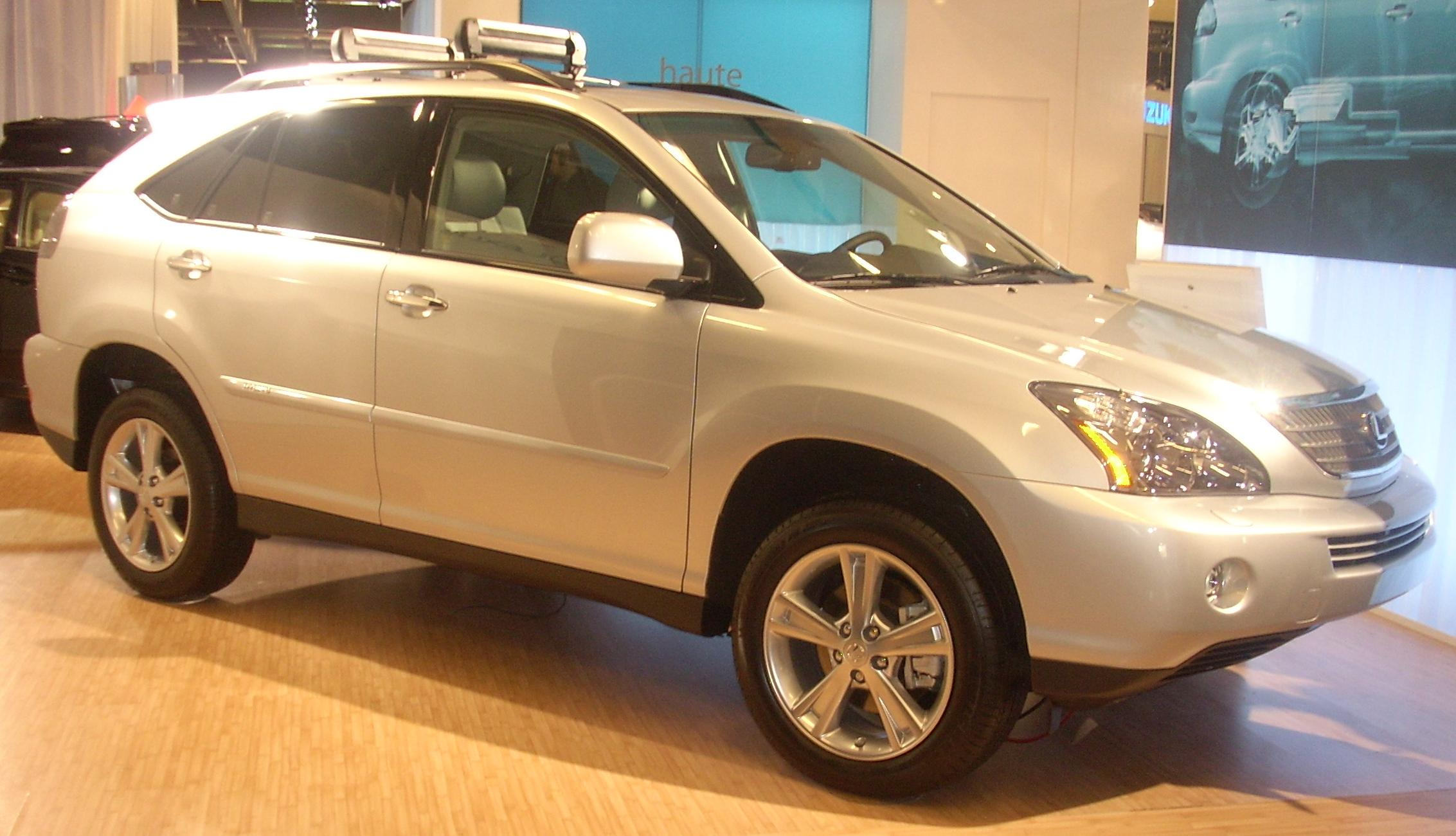
The first production SUV to feature the ECB brake-by-wire system, the Lexus RX 400h

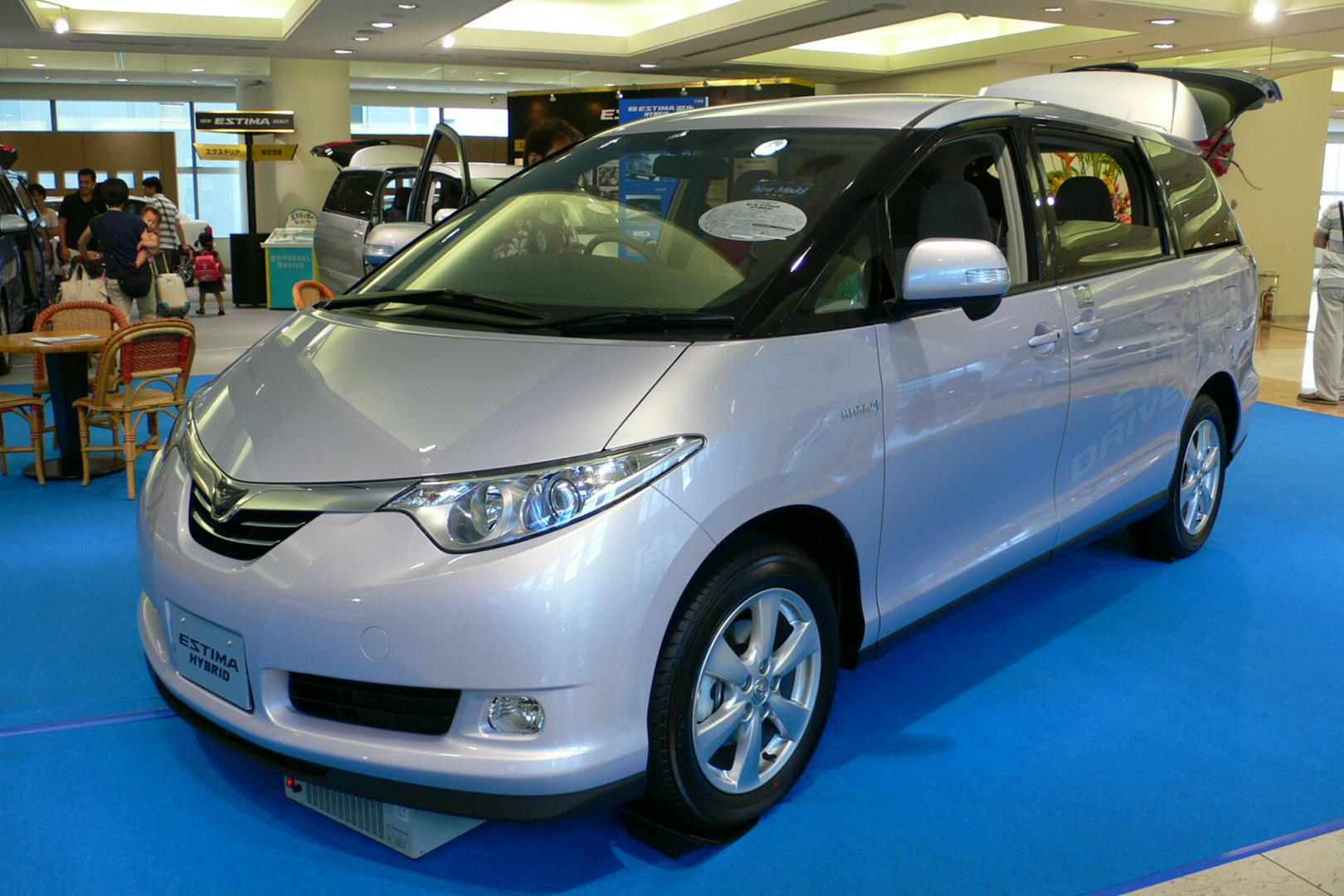
Second generation Toyota Estima Hybrid also received the ECB

Electronically controlled brake (ECB) developed by Toyota Motor Corporation initially for its hybrid and Lexus models, is the world's first production brake-by-wire braking system. The ECB went on sale in Japan in June 2001, first appearing on the Toyota Estima hybrid (first generation), and making its North American debut with the launch of the Lexus RX 400h SUV in April 2005. The ECB is an integral part of the company's Vehicle Dynamics Integrated Management stability control system, by allowing for automatic brake adjustments, which work in conjunction with variable gear-ratio electric power steering systems.

== Namesake ==
- Not to be confused with electronically controlled pneumatic brakes for railways.

== Applications ==
- 2001 Toyota Estima Hybrid
- 2002 Toyota Alphard

Listed by (US model year):

- 2004–2009 Toyota Prius
- 2009–2015 Toyota Prius
- 2006 Toyota Highlander Hybrid
- 2006–2009 Lexus RX 400h
- 2005–2007 Lexus GS 430
- 2007–present Lexus GS 450h
- 2007–present Lexus LS 460
- 2008–present Lexus LS 600h
- 2008–10 Lexus GS 460
- 2010–present Lexus RX 450h
- 2011 Lexus LFA

== See also ==
- brake-by-wire
- Sensotronic (Mercedes-Benz)
