= Shah, Al Gharbia =

Coordinates: 22.9725554°N 53.9889019°E

Shah is a petroleum installation and freight railway station in the Western Region of Abu Dhabi Emirate. It is connected by a 264 km long freight railway line to the Ruwais industrial area. The railway was opened in 2015 as the first stage of the Etihad Rail network, and is used to transport granulated sulphur, a by-product of the petroleum industry to export facilities on the Gulf of Arabia.
