= Hafeet Rail =

Rail transport company

Hafeet Rail (Arabic: حفيت للقطارات) is an Emirati-Omani joint venture railway company set up to connect the United Arab Emirates and Oman by rail. A joint venture of Etihad Rail, Oman Rail, and Mubadala, the railway aims to connect the Etihad Rail network at Al Ain with the port of Sohar. The rail is named after Jebel Hafeet which lies on the border of the United Arab Emirates and Oman.

== History ==
The founding of the joint venture was initially announced in 2022 as the Oman-Etihad Rail Company. On April 23, 2024, the company announced it would be rebranding as Hafeet Rail and had secured shareholder agreement to proceed with construction, including the signing of a $1.5 billion contract for designing and constructing the railway.

Preparatory works commenced in May 2024. If implemented, the link would be the first international segment of the long-planned Gulf Railway. In June 2026, the company announced that the project was 40% complete and track laying has started.

== Characteristics ==
The new railway will extend for 303 km and the cost of the project is estimated at US$3 billion. Trains will travel at a speed of up to 200 km/h and will have a capacity for up to 400 passengers, covering the distance from Abu Dhabi to Sohar in 100 minutes.
