= Etihad Rail DB =

UAE heavy rail services company

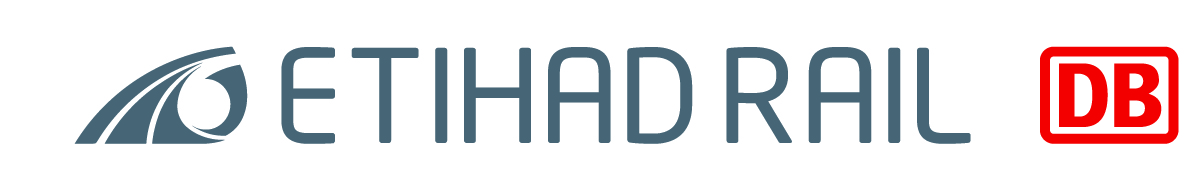
- Headquarters: Abu Dhabi, United Arab Emirates
- Key people: HE Mattar Al Tayer (Chairman); Niko Warbanoff (Vice Chairman); Saeed Salem AlSuwaidi (Chief Executive Officer)
- Services: Railway Operations & Maintenance (O&M)
- Parent: Etihad Rail (51%); Deutsche Bahn (49%)
- Website: www.etihadraildb.com

Etihad Rail DB was a heavy-rail operations and maintenance (O&M) service provider in the UAE. The company was set up in 2013 as a joint venture between Etihad Rail (51%), the developer of the UAE's national railway network and Deutsche Bahn (DB) (49%), Europe's largest railway operator and infrastructure owner. Etihad Rail DB was responsible for the operations and maintenance of Stage One of the UAE's national railway network for Etihad Rail’s primary customer, the Abu Dhabi National Oil Company (ADNOC). Etihad Rail DB concluded an O&M agreement with Etihad Rail in August 2013.

== UAE rail network ==
The first phase was to build a mixed freight and passenger railway across the country. The second phase extends the railway geographically to the other Emirates as well as connect with partner Gulf Cooperation Council (GCC) railway systems in the Sultanate of Oman and the Kingdom of Saudi Arabia.

== Current activities ==
In the first phase of the UAE's national railway network, Etihad Rail DB operated and maintained 264 km of railway route across the Western Region of the Abu Dhabi Emirate and transports granulated sulphur from the sour gas fields of Shah (Al Hosn Gas) and Habshan (GASCO) to the port of Ruwais in the Western Region of Abu Dhabi, where the sulphur product is exported. The spine of the network is the double track line between Liwa and Ruwais in the Western Region of Abu Dhabi. This section was designed to also operate passenger trains in the future.

In 2022, Etihad Rail moved to a self-operating model after concluding a knowledge transfer programme with Deutsche Bahn. Consequently, Etihad Rail DB was dissolved.

Etihad Rail DB is now set to provide "Shadow Operator" services for the second phase of the Etihad Rail project. In its new role, Etihad Rail DB will provide consultancy services to Etihad Rail in preparation for the second phase. Such services will include reviewing the design of new assets, developing Emiratization requirements, drawing up operational procedures and safety management plans and assisting to ensure the project is delivered with an optimal operational cost.

== Service delivery ==
Officially commencing commercial operations in January 2016, Etihad Rail DB has been responsible for the transport of up to 22,000 tonnes of granulated sulphur every day in trains of up to 110 wagons. Trains are hauled by 4,300 horsepower EMD SD-70 locomotives. In February 2017, Etihad Rail DB announced that it had safely run its 1,000th train for ADNOC. As of 20 January 2017, Etihad Rail DB confirmed that it had transported more than 10 million tonnes of sulphur in over 1 million hours worked with zero lost time injury (LTI) in a relatively short time since inception.

== Safety ==
As of the first half of 2017, Etihad Rail DB had achieved its highest performance records against all international safety standards with no lost-time injuries. As railways are new to the region, a community safety campaign was undertaken in 2014 to educate the public on safety around rail tracks.

== Knowledge transfer ==
DB Rail Academy, the international training provider of DB Engineering&Consulting GmbH, developed training programs for knowledge transfer and vocational training. In May 2016, Etihad Rail and Etihad Rail DB co-signed an MoU with the Abu Dhabi Vocational Education & Training Institute (ADVETI) related to occupational training. Under the terms of this MoU, the stakeholders operate occupational training and share knowledge for Emirati students seeking qualifications in the UAE's rail industry, in line with the goals of the country's Emiratization policy. Moreover, Etihad Rail DB has also established a human resources excellence programme which enables UAE nationals to gain on-the-job experience.

== First phase facts ==
- Length: 264 km

Specifications

- Double track main line
- Designed for mixed-use traffic
- Equipped with in-cab European signaling system (ETCS level 2)
- Standard gauge
- 32.5 tonne maximum axle load
- Built to accommodates double stack containers, e.g. in future from Jebel Ali
- Etihad Rail DB is the world's first rail operator to deploy European Train Control System (ETCS_ Level 2 network-wide. ECTS Level 2
- The railway's tracks are fenced off to allow trains to travel safely around the network. People can conveniently cross at 20 over-bridges, two under-bridges, 10 road underpasses and 18 smaller underpasses for future use. Animals will also be able to move around their environment via the 10 camel underpasses, 22 gazelle underpasses, and 78 reptile underpasses

Locomotives

- Seven SD70ACS locomotives
- Model: CLASS SD70, built by Electro-Motive Diesel (EMD)
- Energy: Diesel traction, powered by a 4300-horsepower engine
- Speed: up to120 km/h
- Weight & Length: Each locomotive nominal weight is 190 metric tonnes and is 22.6 metres long
- Each train can comprise up to 110 wagons, making the overall length of the train around 1.8 km

Wagons

- 240 covered hopper wagons
- Supplier: China Railway Rolling Stock Corporation (CRRC, formerly CSR)
- Features: electro-pneumatic brakes, derailment detection systems and a hot-box detection system that will warn of axle overheating, which could cause fires.

Yellow Plant
