= Gulf Railway =

Proposed railway system in Asia

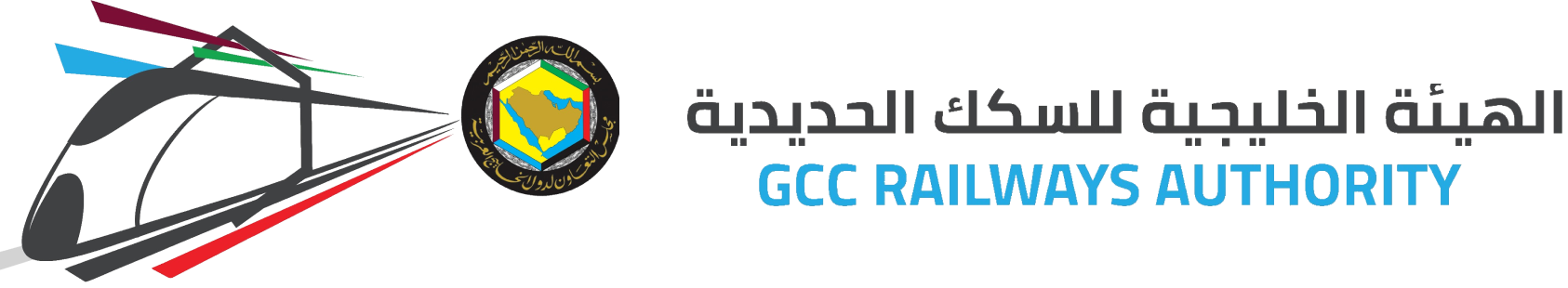

Overview
- Other name: GCC Railway
- Native name: سكك حديد الخليج
- Owner: Bahrain Rail; Kuwait Rail; Etihad Rail; Oman Rail; Qatar Rail; Saudi Arabia Railways
- Locale: Gulf Cooperation Council
- Termini: Kuwait City, Kuwait; Muscat, Oman
- Website: https://gcc-ra.org/

Service
- Type: Inter-city rail
- Rolling stock: Diesel locomotives Electric locomotives

History
- Planned opening: 31 December 2030

Technical
- Line length: 2,177 km (1,353 mi)
- Character: At-grade
- Track gauge: 1,435 mm (4 ft 8 1/2 in) standard gauge
- Electrification: No
- Operating speed: 200-300 km/h (passenger); 80-120 km/h (freight)

The Gulf Railway, also known as the GCC Railway, is a proposed railway system to connect all six Gulf Cooperation Council member states in Eastern Arabia. The rail network will have a total length of 2,177 km. The project is estimated to cost US$250 billion. It was scheduled to be completed by 2030, the network is projected to serve 6 million passengers and transport 201 million tonnes of freight that year, increasing to 8 million passengers and 271 million tonnes by 2045.

Each of the six GCC member states is responsible for implementing the portion of the project that lies within its territory, and will construct its own railway lines and branches, stations and freight terminals. The cost will be shared by the six countries in proportion to the length of the rail network in each country. As a result, the United Arab Emirates and Saudi Arabia will spend the most on the project, followed by Oman, Qatar, Kuwait and Bahrain. The Saudi Railway Company will develop the network in Saudi Arabia, Etihad Rail in the UAE, Oman Rail in Oman, and Qatar Rail in Qatar.

The project has met hurdles on account of challenges with the financing of the project exacerbated by volatile oil prices, and lack of alignment of the interests of the six states involved. The expected date of completion of the project is uncertain, given the lack of clarity on the exact scale and operating model of the venture.

== History ==
The Gulf Railway project was approved by GCC member states at the 30th GCC summit in Kuwait City in December 2009. Saudi Arabia was the only GCC country to have any railway infrastructure at the time the project was proposed. The original deadline to complete the project was 2018. This was postponed to 2021 at a meeting of GCC transport ministers in Riyadh in April 2016.

In November 2015, Saudi Railways Organization (SRO) President Mohamed Al Suwaiket stated that implementation of the GCC Railway had begun in Oman and the United Arab Emirates, and would begin in Saudi Arabia within 2 months. Qatar floated tenders for its portion of the Gulf Railway project in the summer of 2015, but later put the project on hold. In March 2016, Abdulla Al Subaie, managing director of Qatar Rail, stated that Qatar was ready to start work on the project but was waiting for other GCC countries to begin construction. In January 2016, Etihad Rail suspended the tendering process for Phase 2 of the UAE's railway project, which includes the UAE's portion of the Gulf Railway. UAE Minister for Infrastructure Development Abdullah Belhaif Al Nuaimi stated that the decision "was logical because you simply cannot build your part and wait for others to start".

In May 2016, Oman announced that it was putting the project on hold. Omani Minister of Transport Ahmed al-Futaisi said, "There was a challenge among countries in the pace at which the project was being implemented. Some countries started, but some others did not follow the design. So this was a challenge for Oman. Even if Oman finishes its part, it cannot connect because other countries have not started their work." He clarified that Oman "has not cancelled the project, only delayed it as other Persian Gulf countries have decided to stop work on the project". Oman subsequently focused on constructing its domestic rail network linking the ports of Salalah, Sohar and Duqm. Bahrain stated that it would not begin construction on its portion of the project linking with Saudi Arabia until 2023. The country intends to construct the link to Kuwait only after completing the Saudi link.

Futaisi and David Briginshaw, editor-in-chief of the International Railway Journal, have stated that the low price of oil and minerals that has resulted in budget deficits among GCC members is the primary reason hindering the project. Briginshaw said, "Low oil prices affect investment, and obviously [Oman's] project is designed to take minerals to the coast, so if there isn't demand it brings the whole project into question." The project was first conceived during an era of high oil prices. Unlike the EU, the GCC is not economically integrated, and states act independently and pursue their own policies sometimes creating competing economic agendas. Countries have chosen to give priority to their own domestic rail networks over the Gulf Railway, concerned that they may construct lines towards the border before their neighbour sufficiently completes work on their portion of the project. Other concerns hindering the project are visa issues for non-GCC nationals, illegal migration, smuggling, competing economic agendas and disagreements about where the lines should meet.

Helmut Scholze, partner at Roland Berger Middle East, believes the project is delayed due to the lack of clarity on when Saudi Arabia will build its portion of the network. Scholze states that without the Saudi portion, there was no point in UAE proceeding with it portion and even less incentive for Oman, as they would not gain access to Saudi Arabia (the region's largest market) and the other GCC countries. Scholze feels this has resulted in UAE and Oman focusing on constructing domestic rail networks to reduce road traffic and transport goods. Despite the delays, Scholze believes the project will be completed. Construction Week Online cited a rail industry source who also believed the project would be completed. However, the anonymous source felt that the "earliest [completion date] will be 2025 but, if you look at it realistically, the most likely completion date will be 2030".

At the 37th GCC summit in Bahrain in December 2016, the GCC Supreme Council stressed on the importance of members being committed to the railway project. At the request of Saudi King Salman, the Council decided to send the draft project to the economic and development commission to ensure timely implementation. Saudi Minister of Transport Sulaiman al-Hamdan stated that "a large part of this project in Saudi Arabia has been completed".

On 28 February 2017, Abdulla S. Al Katheeri, director-general of the UAE's Federal Transport Authority (FTA) - Land and Maritime, stated that the GCC could meet the 2021 deadline for the project despite fluctuating oil prices. Katheeri pointed out that the total value of proposed rail projects in the GCC was over $240 billion, and $69 billion worth of projects were currently under construction. At the Middle East Rail 2017 conference and exhibition in Dubai on 7 March 2017, GCC Secretary General Abdullatif Al-Zayani stated that the Gulf Railway was necessary to ensure sustained development in the region. He also noted that consensus to complete the project had been established at previous GCC meetings. At the same event President of Saudi Arabia's Public Transport Authority and of the SRO, Rumaih Al Rumaih announced that the GCC had begun conducting a feasibility study to establish a GCC regional rail authority.

In April 2017, Secretary General of the Federation of GCC Chambers Abdul Rahim Al Naqi stated that Saudi Arabia, the UAE, and Oman had made considerable progress in implementing the project. He also confirmed that Bahrain had appointed an international company to execute the project. Naqi clarified that the first phase was for all countries to develop rail connectivity between cities domestically, and then establish cross-border links with other GCC states. Naqi stated that the project in Kuwait was delayed by infrastructural and technical issues. Kuwait authorities encountered issues acquiring farms and other private property along the proposed route, and also had difficulty ensuring that the route did not conflict with oil facilities. He stated that construction of the project in Kuwait would begin in 2018, and complete by 2020. Kuwait began construction of 111-km railway line connecting with Al-Nuwaiseeb on the Saudi border in August 2018.

The UAE section of the project received a boost on 27 November 2018 when the UAE Ministry of Finance and the Abu Dhabi Department of Finance signed an agreement to fund Phase 2 of the country's rail network comprising a 605 kilometer line from Ghuwaifat on the border with Saudi Arabia to Fujairah. The Etihad Rail network opened for cargo only on February 23, 2023.

In April 2024, Etihad Rail and Oman Rail announced a new joint venture, Hafeet Rail, that will construct 300 km (190 mi) of new railway to connect the Etihad Rail network at Abu Dhabi with the port of Sohar, Oman, passing through Al Ain. If built, this would be the first international link of the Gulf Railway.

In early October 2025, the Qatari Cabinet formally approved the agreement for the rail link between Qatar and Saudi Arabia. In December 2025, Saudi Arabia and Qatar signed an agreement to construct a 785 km high-speed electric railway linking Riyadh and Doha, marking the first direct high-speed connection between the two capitals. The project will connect King Salman International Airport with Hamad International Airport and include stops in Hofuf and Dammam. Designed for speeds exceeding 300 km/h, the line is expected to reduce travel time between the capitals to about two hours, accommodate more than 10 million passengers annually, and incorporate five major passenger stations. Scheduled for completion within six years, it is projected to create approximately 30,000 jobs across both countries and enhance regional mobility, trade, and supply-chain integration.

In late October 2025, Hafeet Rail and several logistics partners signed strategic agreements aimed at establishing operational freight and intermodal services for the newly constructed Oman-UAE railway link. Noatum Logistics is set to manage a daily service via the Hafeet Rail network, scheduling seven weekly trains between Abu Dhabi and Sohar Port. Each train is designed to transport 276 standard containers, totaling an estimated annual capacity of 193,200 TEUs. This service will cater to standard 20 ft, 40 ft, and 45 ft containers carrying a wide range of commodities exchanged between the UAE and Oman, including general and manufactured goods, foodstuffs, pharmaceuticals, agricultural products, and essential supplies.

== Network ==
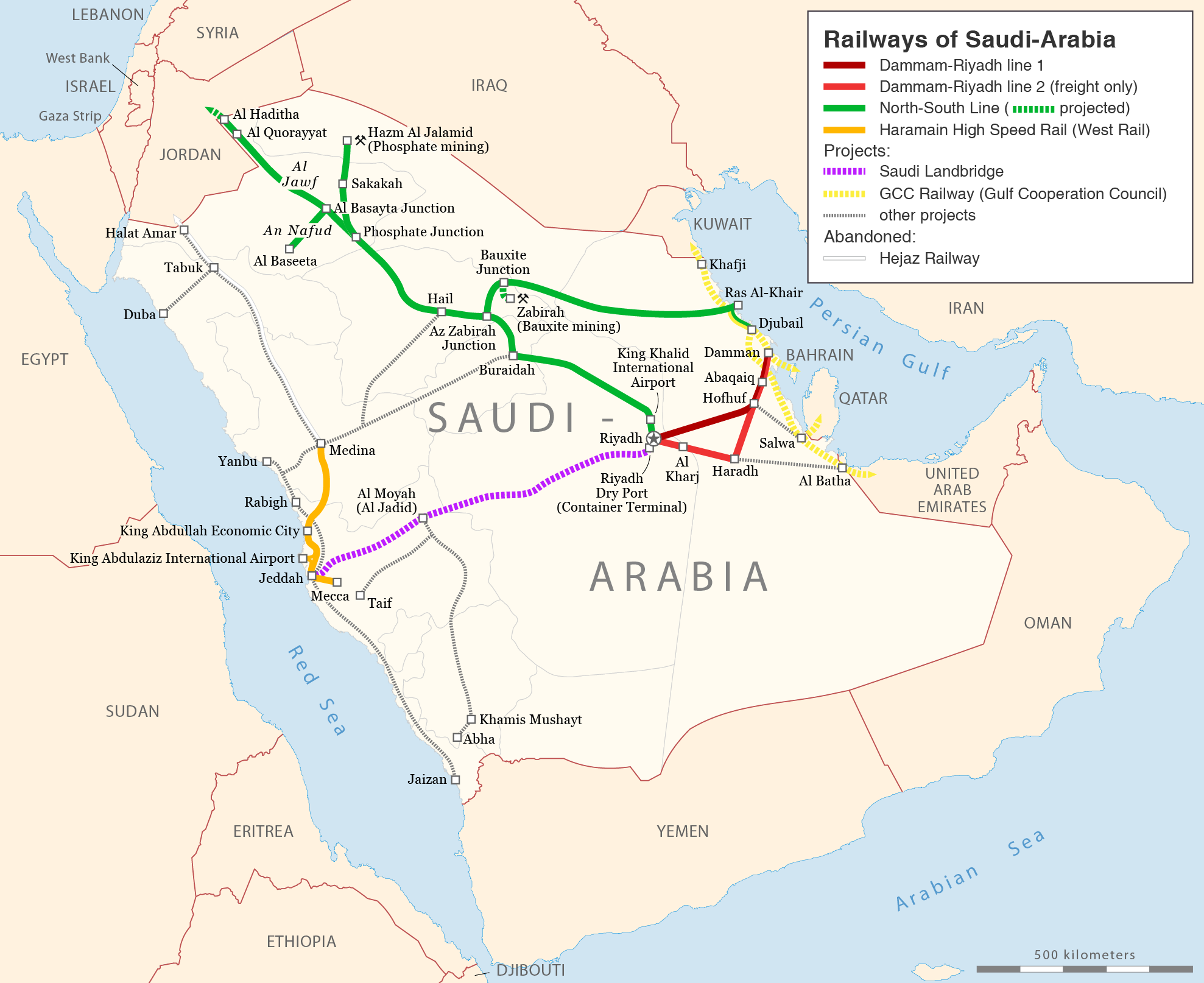
Rail transport map of Saudi Arabia. The GCC Railway network can be seen in yellow.

The planned railway would begin at Kuwait City, pass through Dammam and Al-Batha Port in Saudi Arabia, Abu Dhabi and Al Ain in the UAE, and then enter Oman through Sohar before terminating at Muscat. From Dammam, branches will link to Bahrain through the proposed King Hamad Causeway, and to Qatar via Salwa port. The proposed Qatar–Bahrain Causeway between Bahrain and Qatar will provide additional connectivity.

Three stations are proposed to be constructed in Bahrain. After entering Bahrain from Dammam, the first station on the line will be at Khalifa bin Salman Port, followed by stations at the Bahrain International Airport and Amwaj Islands. From Amwaj, the line will head to Qatar.

The following table shows the length of the system in each country.

Country	Line length
Bahrain	36 km (22 mi)
Kuwait	145 km (90 mi)
Qatar	283 km (176 mi)
Oman	306 km (190 mi)
Saudi Arabia	663 km (412 mi)
United Arab Emirates	684 km (425 mi)

== Infrastructure ==
A GCC Rail Authority was proposed to be established to oversee the development of the network. However, no authority to oversee the project has been established, and countries are currently independently carrying out rail projects within their territory.

The Gulf Railway is expected to boost free movement in the GCC by providing unhindered travel from Kuwait to Oman. GCC nationals have visa-free entry to each other's countries. The railway is also expected to boost intra-GCC trade by providing freight transport services. According to Abdul Rahim Hassan Naqi, Secretary General of the Federation of the GCC Chambers of Commerce and Industry, the railway will provide more than 80,000 direct and indirect jobs once it is made operational.

=== Rolling stock ===
Diesel locomotives will be used on the GCC Railway. Passenger trains will operate at a speed of 220 km/h, while freight trains will be limited to speeds of 80–120 km/h.

== See also ==
- Rail transport in Bahrain
- Rail transport in Kuwait
- Rail transport in Oman
- Rail transport in Qatar
- Rail transport in Saudi Arabia
- Rail transport in the United Arab Emirates
