= Oman Rail =

Railway company of Oman

Oman Rail is a railway company responsible for rail transport in Oman. It was owned and operated by the Omani Ministry of Transport. Oman Rail is part of Asyad Group. The company is based in Al Qurum, Muscat.

== History ==
The company was founded in June 2014. Oman Rail will be responsible for developing the rail network in the country. Oman Rail planned to link Buraimi on the UAE border with Sohar, as part of the proposed Gulf Railway. The first section was announced to be a 207 km (129 mi), double-track, standard-gauge line with 32.4 t (31.9 long tons; 35.7 short tons) axle loads and a loading gauge sufficient to accommodate double-stack container trains. Diesel locomotives will run on the line initially, but the plans will provide an option for future electrification.

The next phase of Oman's railway project will be built in two stages. First, an 11 km (6.8 mi) section will connect the previous line from Hafeet to Ibri. This will be then be extended by 126 km (78 mi) from Ibri to the new economic zone that is proposed to be built. Future plans include extending the network beyond Al Dhahirah, traversing vast expanses of desert in central Oman via Ghabah to Haima, with a southward branch to Al Duqm (and later to Mazyounah on the Yemeni border), and with another branch to Salalah. The final phase of the rail network envisions a south–north line Amal via Al Duqm to Muscat and Sohar.

Passenger trains will operate on the network at speeds of 220 km/h (140 mph), while freight trains will be limited to a speed of 120 km/h (75 mph).

Nabil Al Bimani, Group Chief, Ports and Free Zones at Asyad Groups, stated that the first railway line in Oman would be a cargo line connecting Mangi Al-Shuwaimeh and Al-Duqm linking metal production fields with manufacturers and export sites.

In September 2022 Oman Rail and the UAE's Etihad Rail agreed to set up an equally owned company, Oman-Etihad Rail Company, to build a 303 km (188 mi) railway linking Sohar with Abu Dhabi.

In April 2024, Oman Rail and Etihad Rail announced a new joint venture, Hafeet Rail, that will construct 300 km (190 mi) of new railway to connect Abu Dhabi, UAE with Sohar, Oman.

In April 2026 Etihad Rail announced that 40 per cent of the Hafeet Rail project, a joint venture between Etihad Rail, Oman Rail and Mubadala Investment Company, had been completed.
