= Vehicle Dynamics Integrated Management =

Vehicle handling system by Toyota

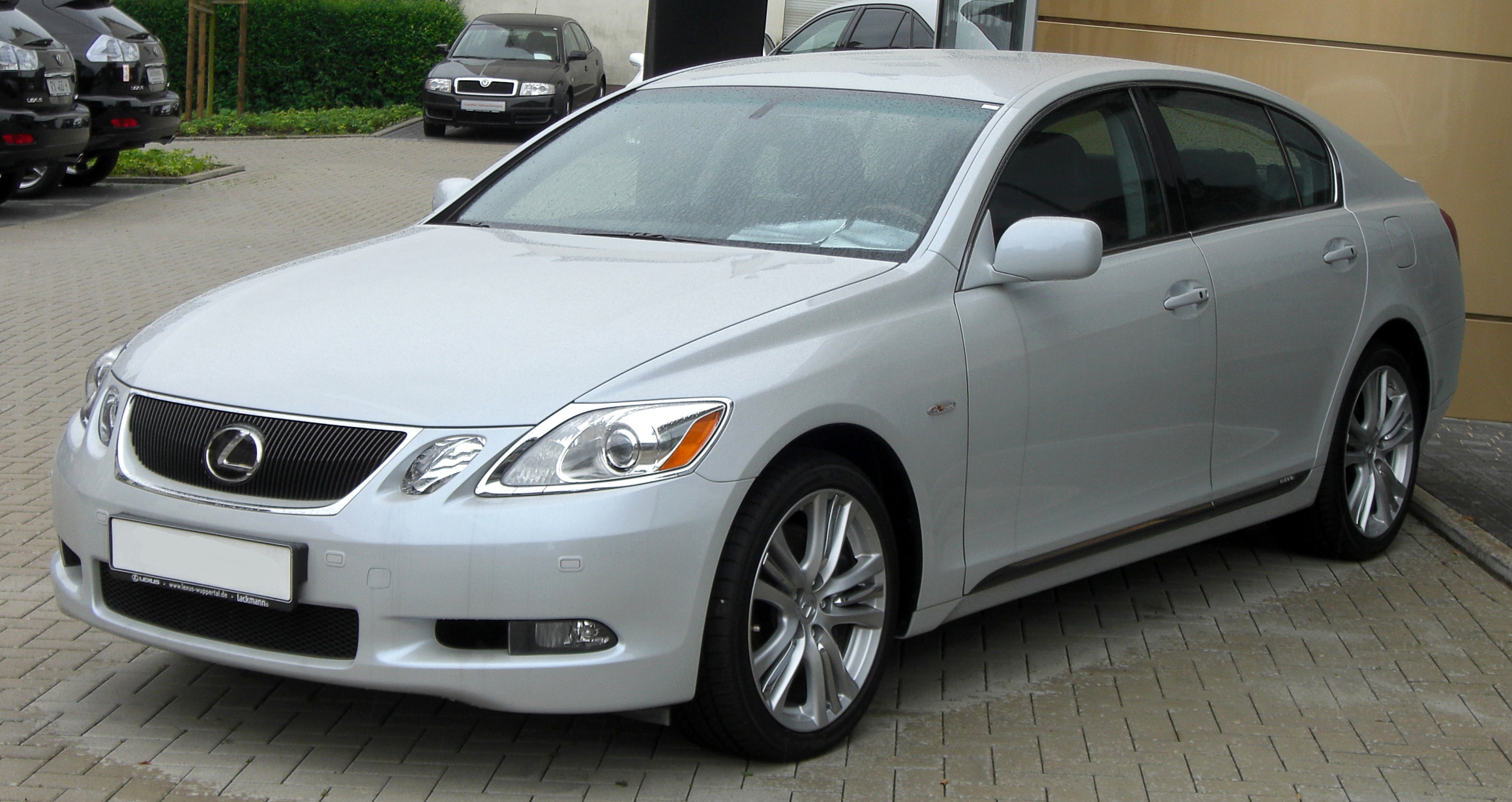
The first vehicle to debut VDIM outside Japan, the Lexus GS (2005–present)

Vehicle Dynamics Integrated Management (VDIM) is an integrated vehicle handling and software control system developed by Toyota. It involves an omnibus computer linkage of traction control, electronic stability control, electronic steering, and other systems, with the intent of improving responsiveness to driver input, performance, and overall safety. The system was first introduced in the Japanese domestic market in July 2004, when Toyota debuted VDIM on the Toyota Crown Majesta. This was followed by the VDIM's export debut on the third generation Lexus GS, which was launched in 2005. VDIM integrates the company's Electronically Controlled Brake (ECB), Anti-Lock Brakes (ABS), Electronic Brakeforce Distribution (EBD), Traction Control (TRC) and Vehicle Stability Control (VSC) active safety systems with the Adaptive Variable Suspension (AVS), Electric Power Steering (EPS) and Variable Gear Ratio Steering (VGRS) systems which previously worked independently using proprietary software. This way all the systems function together rather than the ECU prioritizing which is the most important. VDIM was initially designed for rear-wheel drive cars.

VDIM's capabilities expand upon Toyota's stand-alone Vehicle Stability Control (VSC) system which was introduced in 1995; VSC remains the baseline electronic stability control system used by the company. VSC by definition does not intervene until after a skid is detected, while VDIM takes measures to prevent skids, slides, or wheel spins rather than just take action after tire slippage has occurred. This is done by constantly making corrections in a subtle manner that are transparent to the driver. In further contrast with VSC, VDIM can also calibrate driver steering input according to vehicle speed, with active steering and throttle adjustments to improve ride quality and directional control during performance driving, such as in slalom courses.

With the EPS system VDIM instantly varies the amount of power steering assist depending on driving conditions. In vehicles equipped with Variable Gear Ratio Steering (VGRS), VDIM also manages steering gear ratios to help the driver maintain control. Initially, the system was only offered on vehicles equipped with Electronically Controlled Brake (ECB), but this is no longer required.

We drove a Highlander equipped with Toyota's standard stability control system. When running through a loose dirt course, it kept us pointed in the right direction. At the same time, it felt intrusive and somewhat herky-jerky as it did its magic to keep us in line. But then we drove a Highlander Hybrid, which has the new VDIM system, through the same slalom. The new system made the old one feel crude by comparison. The VDIM was virtually invisible in operation, making it seem as if the Highlander Hybrid was guided by the hand of God.

— John DiPietro, Edmunds.com

== Applications ==
- Lexus IS: IS 350 (2005), IS 250 (2008), IS F (2007; with an additional "sport" setting)
- Lexus GS: GS 430 (2005), GS 350 (2006), GS 450h (2006), GS 460 (2007)
- Lexus LS: LS 460 (2006), LS 600h (2007), LS 500, LS 500h (2018)
- Lexus RX: RX 400h (2005), RX 350 (2009), RX 450h (2009)
- Lexus NX: NX 300h (2014 on)
- Toyota Camry Hybrid (2006)
- Toyota Crown Majesta (2004)
- Toyota Highlander Hybrid (2005)
- Toyota Sienna (2011)
- Toyota Land Cruiser (J300) (2021)

== Similar systems ==
- Cadillac Integrated Chassis Control System (ICCS)
