= Electronically controlled pneumatic brakes =

Railway braking system

Electronically controlled pneumatic brakes are a type of railway braking systems.

== Overview ==
Traditional train braking systems use pneumatic valves to control and generate brake applications on the cars along the length of the train. In general, this conventional system consists of a brake pipe that runs the length of the train which supplies air to reservoirs mounted on each of the cars. When the brake pipe and car components are charged with air, the brakes release. When the engineer needs to make a brake application, control valves in the locomotive reduce the brake pipe pressure. As the brake pipe pressure is reduced, the service portions on each car divert air from their reservoirs to their brake cylinders. To release the brakes, the engineer charges the brake pipe. This method of controlling the brakes on freight and passenger cars has remained virtually unchanged since its invention by George Westinghouse in 1868.

The conventional braking system suffers from many weaknesses; one of which is in the reaction time. Because the engineer controls the flow of air into and out of the brake pipe from the locomotive, it can take up to two minutes for a commanded brake application to propagate to the back of a long freight train. This uneven braking can cause significant forces to build up between the cars in a train.

Also, since the brake pipe is typically used for control and supply of air to the cars, if an engineer is not careful, the air supply can be depleted. Further, since the engineer is only aware of the brake pipe pressure and flow of air into the brake pipe, it is not easy to know the state of the train brakes at any given time.

In contrast, ECP braking uses electronic controls which make it possible to activate air-powered brakes on the cars. On an ECP-equipped train, the cars are equipped with a trainline cable that runs parallel to the brake pipe down the length of the train. This cable is used to supply power to the electronic components installed on the cars. The cable also doubles as a communication medium that allows the locomotive to send commands to, and receive feedback from, the cars along the length of the train.

ECP provides many benefits over the traditional braking system. For example, since all the cars receive the brake command at the same time, the brakes are applied uniformly and instantaneously. This provides much better train control, shortens the stopping distances, and leads to a lower risk of derailment or of coupling breakage.

If the train divides, the cable is disconnected, automatically applying the brakes.

Also with ECP, the brake pipe remains charged during operation. This allows the reservoirs on the cars to continuously charge making it less likely for the braking air supply to be exhausted. Further, since the cars can also send their status to the locomotive at the front, the engineer can monitor the state of the train and know at any given time the braking capabilities available.

The ECPB can also apply the brakes on the rearmost wagons slightly before the brakes on the front wagons are applied, which reduces the shock and noise of the wagons bunching up.

== Testing ==
Greater intervals between brake tests are also likely because of the ability of ECP brakes to self-diagnose which should generate large cost savings that will help pay for the system to be installed.

The benefits are better control of braking, less equipment wear from pushing and pulling between cars, shorter stopping distance and improved headways.

== Control and power ==
When first developed, electric control ECP brakes needed a number of wires along the train to control solenoids on each wagon to release the brakes, and were not considered economic for freight. This has changed with the introduction of electronic controls, allowing data to be transmitted by two-conductor wire or radio from the locomotive to a microprocessor on each car, where locally powered valves hold the desired pressure in each brake cylinder.

== Use on Fortescue Railway ==
ECP can use axle-generated power or wire-distributed power. The Fortescue railway line in Australia uses wire-distributed power at 200 volts direct current. The Fortescue line also places the two brake pipes and single control/power cables on one side of the wagons only, as trains operate only as block loads and the wagons are not normally reversed. Having the wires on one side avoids the need for crew to stoop under the coupling, as would be the case with the normal configuration where the hose and wire cross under the coupling.

== Compatibility ==
ECP brakes from different manufacturers are meant to be mutually compatible. The New York Air Brake Company, based in Watertown, N.Y., is a unit of Knorr-Bremse, based in Munich, Germany. Wabtec Railway Electronics, or WRE, a unit of Wabtec, has facilities in Germantown, MD, and Cedar Rapids, Iowa.

In the case of the Fortescue railway, the new ECP brakes are incompatible in several ways.

- The wagon-to-wagon pipes are straight and are on one side of the wagon only, and do not cross over to the other side underneath the coupling.
- Wagons are one-sided, though locomotives are dual-sided for flexibility. The wagons are one-sided to suit a rotary tippler.

== Timeline and examples ==
- (Japan) 1968: Mitsubishi Electric delivered "MBS type electric command brake control unit" for 7000 and 8000 Class EMU of Osaka Municipal Subway.
- (Japan) 1971: TRTA 6000 series EMU for Chiyoda Subway line, ECP in combination with chopper circuit regenerative brake system.
- 1982: 200 Series EMU of Tohoku Shinkansen and Joetsu Shinkansen (the bullet trains), the first example of the ECP on high-speed trains in Japan.
- (United States) 1990s: First trials on BN. TSM of Kansas City operated more than eight coal and intermodal trains using their "EABS" ECP for BN, CP, and Amtrak. TSM was purchased by Wabco in 1998.
- October 11, 2007: The first ECP-equipped Norfolk Southern train in the United States began operating.
- 2007: Testing of ECP braking on Spoornet's Richards Bay heavy haul line in South Africa was also expected to begin, for service in 2009.
- (United States) January 24, 2008: first trials on BNSF BNSF retrofit 300 Powder River Basin coal cars with Wabtec ECP-4200.
- ECP braking is also being tested in Australia.
- (Australia) May 2008: new Fortescue railway line has ECP.
- (Canada) September 2008: Canadian Pacific begun testing ECP-equipped coal trains on its coal haul route in British Columbia.
- (United States) November 2008: According to Railway Gazette International the two systems from NYAB and Wabtec are meant to be interoperable, but testing to confirm this has yet to be carried out. Federal rules limit normal air brake inspection to once every 1,600 kilometers, but with ECP this increases to 5600 kilometres, allowing a coast-to-coast return trip on a single inspection at a home base.
- (Australia) August 2012, Rio Tinto railway - entire fleet of 7,500 iron ore wagons.
- (Australia) 2013, Aurizon 3 of 12 x 6000 class locomotives and coal wagons
- (Australia) April 2014, All Xstrata coal hoppers.
- (Australia) April 2014, Pacific National coal wagons.

== Distributed power ==
Distributed power is a system where locomotives are coupled in the middle and/or end of a heavy train and remotely controlled originally via radio from the locomotive in the front. Amongst other advantages, this reduces coupling stresses in long and heavy trains. The ECP wiring can also be used to control these intermediate locomotives.

== Parameters ==
- Standard: Association of American Railroads S-4200
- Train length: 3,700 metres (12,000 ft) maximum
- Wagons (network devices): 180
- Wired distributed power (WDP): 230 V DC

== Regulation ==
In 2014, the U.S. Federal Railroad Administration proposed that electronic braking be required on trains carrying hazardous materials. The Trump administration repealed the proposed rule, after it had been modified and weakened by lobbyists, in 2017.

== See also ==
- Electronically controlled brake - for road vehicles
- Electronically controlled unit injector
