= List of Old Reptonians =

Repton School is a co-educational private school for day and boarding pupils in Repton, Derbyshire, England. The school has around 660 pupils aged between 13 and 18, of whom 451 are boarders. Repton School taught only boys for its first 400 years; Repton started accepting girls in the sixth form early in the 1970s, and within 20 years became completely coeducational.

The following are notable alumni of Repton School:

- Harold Abrahams, 100-metre Gold Medallist, 1924 Olympics
- Charles A. Adeogun-Phillips, genocide and war crimes prosecutor
- James Airy, cricketer and soldier
- Sir Harry Altham, cricket historian, coach and administrator
- Michael Des Barres, actor and musician
- James Theodore Bent (1852–1897), English explorer, archaeologist and author.
- Paul Borrington, cricketer
- Walter Buckmaster, (1872–1942) Polo player (1900 summer Olympics)
- Lieutenant General Gerard Bucknall, (1894–1980) British Army officer who served in World War I and World War II and commanded XXX Corps during Operation Overlord
- Sydney Carline, (1888–1929), artist.
- Donald Carr, (1926–) Cricketer for Derbyshire and England
- Tom Chambers, actor and winner of Strictly Come Dancing
- Jeremy Clarkson, journalist and ex-presenter of the BBC show Top Gear. Current The Grand Tour host alongside James May and Richard Hammond
- Adrian Newey, Formula One engineer
- John Cornforth, architectural historian
- Jack Crawford, cricketer
- Roald Dahl, author
- Sir James Darling, Headmaster of Geelong Grammar School and chairman of the Australian Broadcasting Commission
- Horace Davenport, first-class cricketer
- Norman Demuth, Classical music composer & writer.
- Anthony Devas, artist.
- George Dodsworth, first-class cricketer
- Blair Dunlop, musician and actor.
- Tristram Fane Saunders, poet, critic and editor
- James Fenton, poet
- Sir Maurice Finnes, industrialist
- Sir Henry Firebrace, courtier to Charles I and Charles II
- Walter Franklin, cricketer
- Sir Christopher Frayling, Rector, The Royal College of Art
- C. B. Fry, cricketer
- Lieutenant General Sir Charles Henry Gairdner (1898–1983), Governor of Western Australia and Governor of Tasmania
- Graeme Garden, comedian, member of The Goodies
- Susie Gilbert, Field Hockey Player, Commonwealth Silver Medallist
- Johnny Gorman, footballer
- Francis Gould, cricketer
- Chris Gray (22 May 1942 – 14 May 2009) was an activist in the Situationist International
- Anthony Gross, artist
- Francis Habgood, Police Chief
- Sir Stuart Hampshire, Oxford philosopher
- Jonathan Harvey, composer
- John Holmes, cricketer
- Will Hughes, footballer
- John Hutton, first-class cricketer
- Richard Hutton, England Test cricketer
- Christopher Isherwood, novelist and screenwriter
- Stephen Jones, lead singer of the band Babybird
- Jordan King, British racing driver
- Herbert Fortescue Lawford (1851–1925) tennis player, Wimbledon champion 1887
- Sir Desmond Lee, classical scholar
- Andrew Li, Former Chief Justice of Hong Kong
- Geoffrey Lumsden, actor in Dad's Army
- William Lumsden, first-class cricketer
- Ewen MacIntosh, actor in The Office
- John Makinson, Chairman of Penguin Random House and The National Theatre
- Eric Maschwitz, entertainer, writer, broadcaster
- Arthur James Mason, classical scholar and Vice-Chancellor of the University of Cambridge
- Shona McCallin, Field Hockey Player and Olympic gold medalist at the 2016 Summer Olympics
- Derek Mendl (1914–2001), Argentine cricketer
- Jack Mendl (1911–2001), Argentine cricketer and educator
- Charles Armytage-Moore, (1880–1960) founder partner of London Stockbrokers, Buckmaster & Moore (now Credit Suisse Group)
- Alfred Morcom (1885–1952), cricketer and physician
- Alan E. Munby (1870–1938), architect
- Edward Oakden, British Ambassador to UAE
- Peter Oldfield, SAS commander
- Mike Parker, Olympic athlete
- Reginald Popham, cricketer and footballer
- Michael Ramsey, Archbishop of Canterbury
- George Rainsford, English actor
- Basil Rathbone, actor most known for playing Sherlock Holmes in the Sherlock Holmes film series
- Denys Rayner, Battle of the Atlantic veteran, writer and boat designer
- Nick Raynsford, Labour MP
- W. A. Robotham of Rolls-Royce
- Sir John Rolleston, Conservative MP
- Kenneth Rose, prize-winning biographer of Lord Curzon, George V and Lord Rothschild; contributed the column Albany to the Sunday Telegraph for 36 years.
- Martin Rowley, golf caddie
- Arnold Rutherford, cricketer
- John Rutherford, cricketer
- Ben Sharpe Olympian, Sydney 2000
- Sir John Stanley, Conservative MP
- Johnny Rozsa, fashion, portrait, and celebrity photographer
- Robert Sangster, racehorse owner and breeder author
- John James Scott-Chisholme, Boer war cavalry officer
- Lieutenant-General Sir Frederick Shaw, World War I officer and Commander-in-Chief, Ireland
- Rupert Shephard, English artist
- The Revd Henry Holmes Stewart (1847–1937) 1873 FA Cup winner
- Georgie Twigg, Field Hockey Player Olympic bronze medallist (London 2012) and Olympic gold medalist at the 2016 Summer Olympics
- Edward Upward, novelist and short story writer
- Charles Warner (born 1938), cricketer
- Ellie Watton, Field Hockey Player Commonwealth silver medallist (Glasgow 2014),
- Charles Watts (1905–1985), cricketer and British Army officer
- Denton Welch, (1915–1948) writer and painter
- John Williams (1911–1964), cricketer and solicitor
- Andy Wilman, Top Gear producer (2002–2015), Top Gear (1994–2001) and The Grand Tour (2016 – present)
- Jason Windsor (born 1972), businessman and cricketer
- Alfred Gascoyne Wise, (1854–1923) colonial judge
- Nicholas Wood, (1832–1892) industrialist and Conservative MP
- William Wyatt (1842–1908), cricketer and clergyman
- Robert J. C. Young, post-colonial theorist, cultural critic and historian
