= Funko =

American toy company

Funko Inc.
- Type: Public
- Traded as: Nasdaq: FNKO (Class A); Russell 2000 Index component
- Industry: Toys
- Founded: 1998
- Founder: Mike Becker
- Headquarters: Everett, Washington, U.S.
- Key people: Josh Simon (CEO)
- Products: Vinyl figures, bobbleheads
- Revenue: ▲US$1.32 billion (2022)
- Operating income: ▼ -11.9 million (2022)
- Net income: ▼ -$8.04 million (GAAP) (2022)
- Subsidiaries: Mondo
- Website: funko.com

Funko Inc. is an American company that manufactures licensed and limited pop culture collectibles, known for its licensed vinyl figurines and bobbleheads. In addition, the company produces licensed plush, action figures, apparel, accessories and games. Founded in 1998 by Mike Becker, Funko was originally conceived as a small project to create various low-tech, nostalgia-themed toys. The company's first manufactured bobblehead was of the Big Boy restaurant mascot.

The company was first sold in 2005 and since then, the company has increased the scope of its toy lines and signed licensing deals with major companies such as Warner Bros., Paramount Skydance, NBCUniversal, Disney, Sony, Shueisha, Marvel Entertainment, and Major League Baseball. As of August 2025, the company is headed by CEO Josh Simon.

== History ==
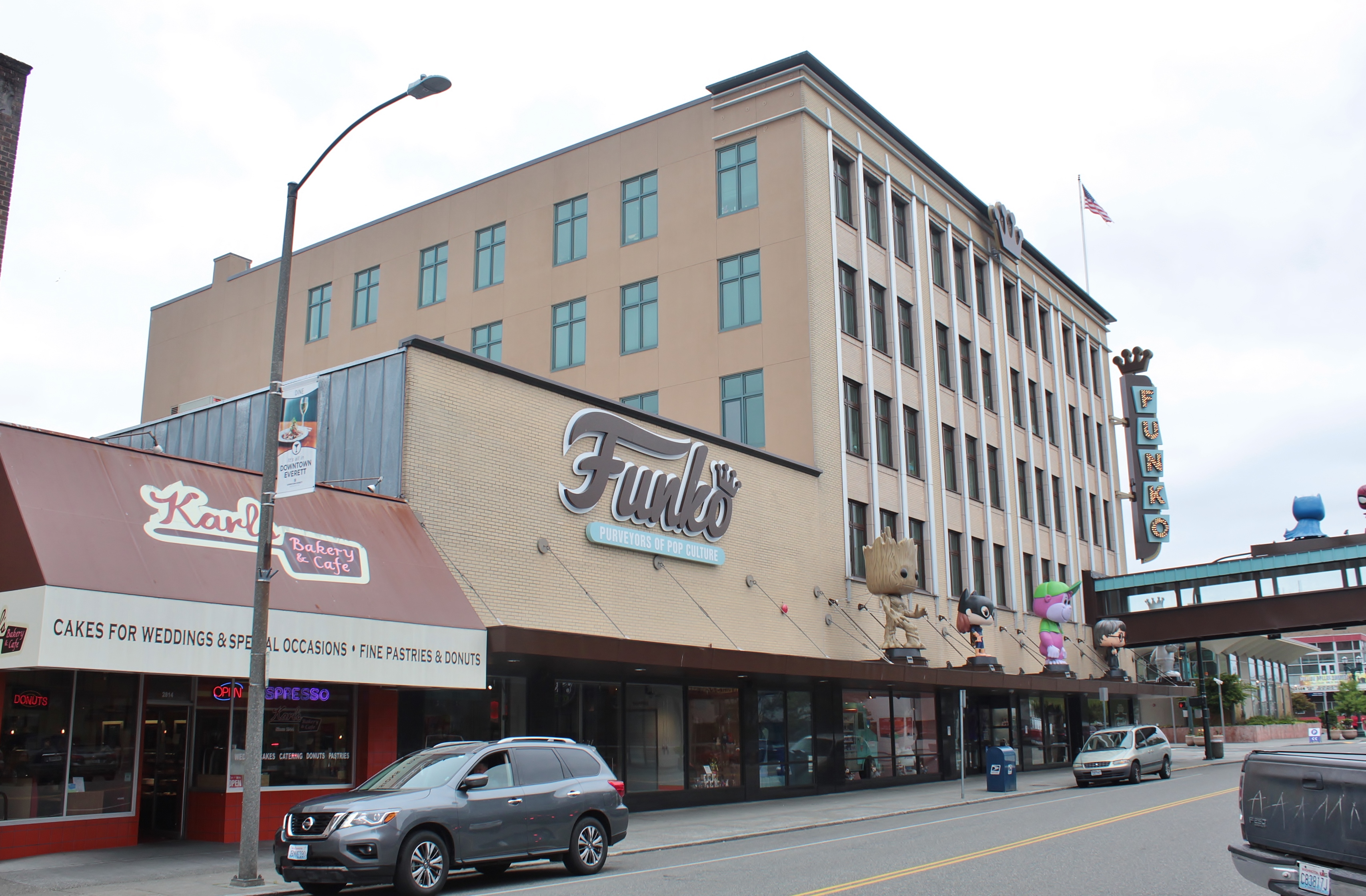
Funko headquarters in Everett, Washington

Funko was founded in 1998 by toy collector Mike Becker at his home in Snohomish, Washington. He started the business after failing to find an affordable coin bank of the Big Boy Restaurants mascot, instead licensing the rights to make his own coin banks from a Big Boy franchise in Michigan. The coin banks failed to sell and the franchise filed for bankruptcy protection, but Funko remained in business after licensing the rights to bobbleheads for Austin Powers, which sold 80,000 units. After this, some of the first characters that Funko sold were the Grinch, Tony the Tiger, and Cheerios mascot, the honeybee. In 2005, Becker sold Funko to Brian Mariotti who moved its offices to Lynnwood, Washington, and significantly expanded its licensed product lines. In 2011, Funko began selling their Pop! Vinyl line of figurines. By 2012, the company had sold more than $20 million of merchandise.

The company was sold to Fundamental Capital, a private equity firm, in 2013 to raise funds. ACON Investments, LLC announced in late 2015 that it had acquired Funko from Fundamental Capital, LLC, but would keep current staff and the head of the company.

By late 2016 it had outgrown its original headquarters in Everett and announced plans to move into a downtown building with more space and a retail store. Funko acquired British toymaker Underground Toys, also its European distributor, in early 2017. Funko opened its new headquarters and 17,000-square-foot (1,600 m^{2}) flagship store in downtown Everett on August 19, 2017. Funko was listed on the NASDAQ stock exchange on November 2, 2017, but suffered the worst initial public offering of the 21st century, with shares falling by 40 percent and only raising $125 million.

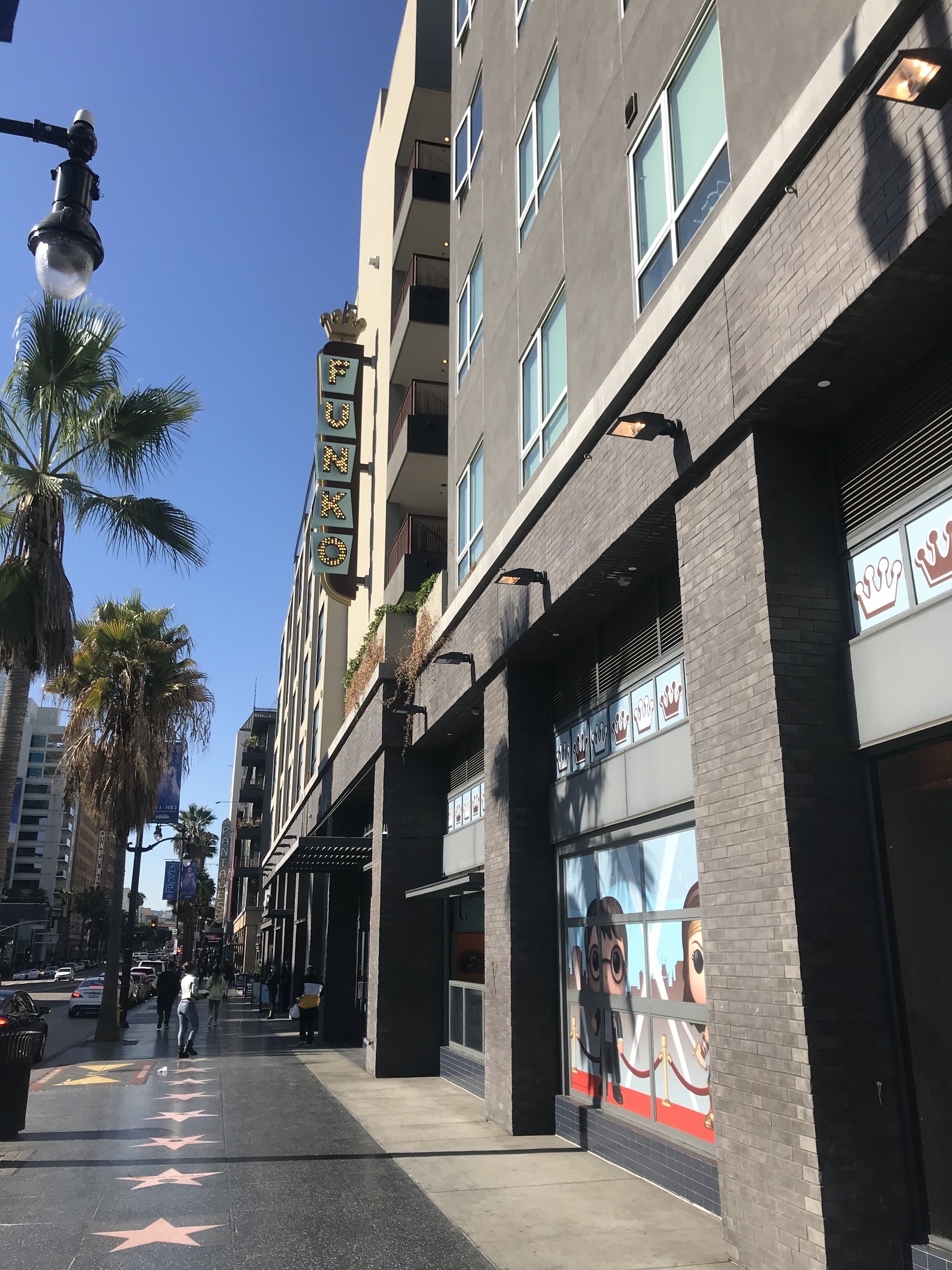
Funko: Hollywood in Hollywood, California

In June 2017, Funko acquired the fashion accessories line Loungefly.

The company opened its second storefront in November 2019, located in Hollywood, Los Angeles. It has 40,000 square feet (3,700 m^{2}) of space and includes life-size statues and movie "sets".

In June 2022, Funko acquired Austin, Texas-based Mondo, a high-end pop culture company.

In 2022, Funko expanded its global presence by opening its first franchise store outside of the United States in Dubai Hills Mall, UAE. This store was followed by two additional stores in 2023, one at Dubai Mall and the other at Reem Mall in Abu Dhabi. All stores are operated and managed by Monkey Distribution, Funko's official distributor in the MENA region.

In 2023, Funko opened a store front in partnership with rapper Snoop Dogg called the “Dogg House.” Located next to So-Fi Stadium in California, the store sold exclusive Funko Pop Vinyl figures and had a Funko themed mural.

In March 2023, Funko announced that an excess of old inventory would be disposed of due to limited warehouse capacity.

In August 2025, Josh Simon was named CEO of the company.

== Production ==
Products are designed at the Funko headquarters in Everett, Washington, and in other locations throughout the U.S. New figures are designed with input from licensors, in-studio artists, and fans through social media. Funko artists use ZBrush to create digital models that are revised before being made into prototype sculptures, which are sent for approval from manufacturers and licensors. The completed figures are manufactured at factories in China and Vietnam.

== Product lines ==
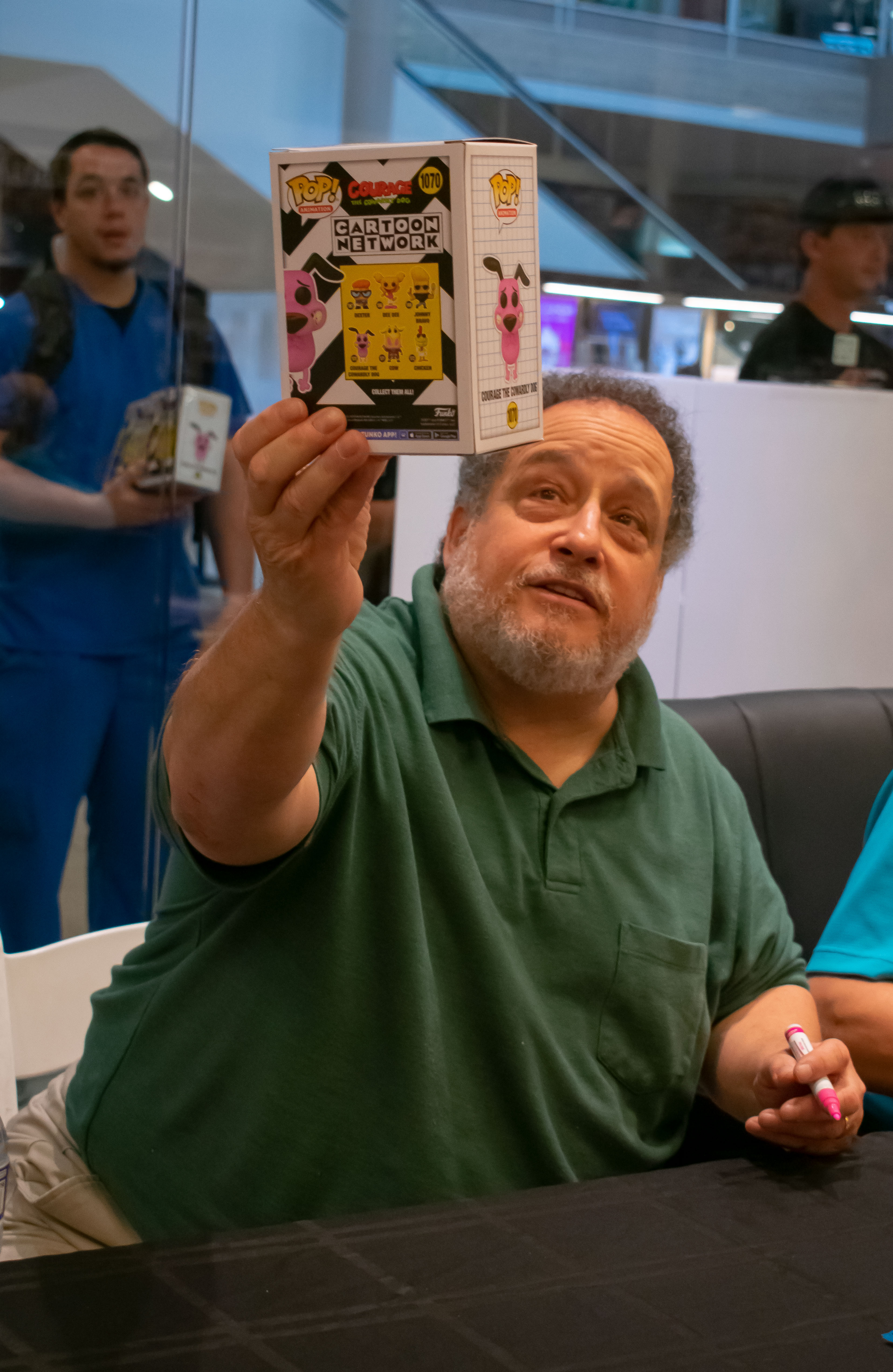
Marty Grabstein holding a signed Funko Pop! of Courage the Cowardly Dog

Funko has produced thousands of products across dozens of different toy lines since its inception. The first, Wacky Wobblers, was a line of bobbleheads depicting various characters, mainly from popular culture, such as Betty Boop, Cap'n Crunch, and The Cat in the Hat. The company's mascot, a recurring character in the Funko franchise, is Freddy Funko, who was introduced in 2002.

=== Pop! ===
In 2010, the Funko Pop! line was created. Funko Pop! vinyl line are figures modelled in a style similar to the Japanese chibi style. The figures have large squarish heads, disproportionately small bodies, and large, circular black eyes. The figures typically depict licensed characters from franchises such as Doctor Who, Marvel, DC, Disney, Pixar, Star Wars, Wizarding World, Dragon Ball, My Hero Academia and other pop culture entities. After a preview line of DC Comics characters were released at San Diego Comic-Con in 2010, the original Funko Pop! line of products was fully revealed in 2011 at the New York Toy Fair.

The exaggerated body proportions of Pop! figures have invited comparisons with Good Smile’s Nendoroid figures, which are similarly described as "chibi". Both product lines depict characters from many different franchises.

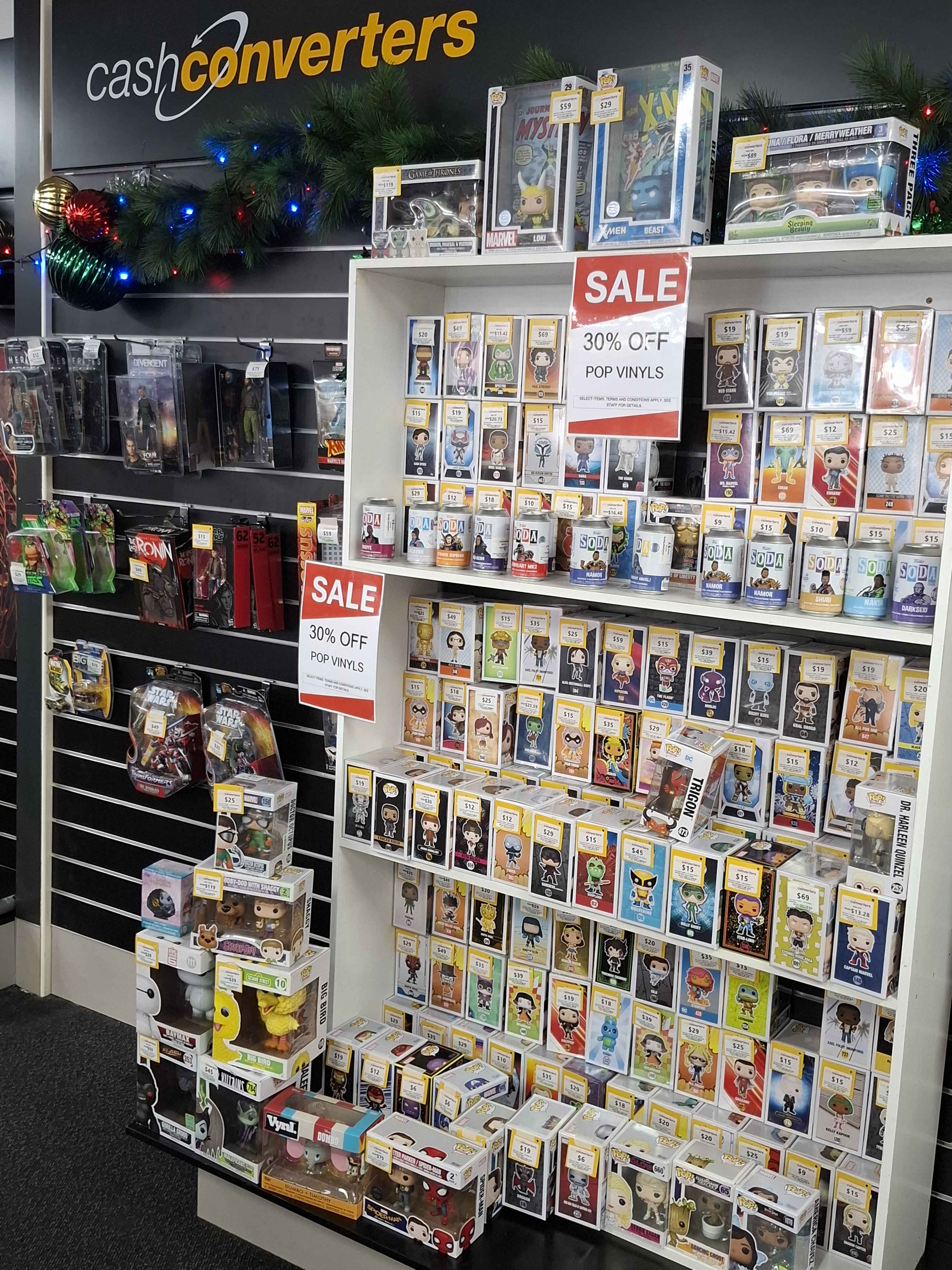
A liquidation of various Funko Pop! figures at a Cash Converters store

Most Funko Pop! figures are not bobbleheads, as their heads do not move. However most Marvel figures, and all Star Wars and Genshin Impact figures are bobbleheads. The Star Wars and Marvel packaging describes them as bobbleheads to avoid licensing conflicts with Hasbro and the Good Smile Company, who own the respective rights to produce figures of these franchises. The Genshin Impact products are labelled as figures, as no such conflict exists.

Various other products have been released using the Pop! brand and its character stylization, such as plush toys, T-shirts, keychains (miniaturized versions of the normal figures), and ceramic mugs, the latter of which are enlarged, hollow copies of a figure's head, with a handle attached.

The Funko Pop! line also has figures that are larger than the standard figure, in 6-inch, 10-inch, 18-inch, and the now-retired 9-inch size. Within the Funko Pop! product line, there is a series known as Pop! Rides, featuring the Funko Pop! figure in a vehicle. In addition, Funko produces Pop! Deluxe, where a character is seated on external set pieces, such as a throne, a vehicle, or creature. With Pop! Comic Covers line, Funko has also begun creating movie and comic moments, which feature posed Pop! figures interacting with each other and on display bases in ways that replicate moments from different movies and comic books. The Pop! Albums line features artists with their album covers. At the New York Toy Fair 2019, Funko announced a new line of Pop! vinyl figures: Pop! Town, initially including Ghostbusters, Scooby-Doo, SpongeBob SquarePants, and The Nightmare Before Christmas. This line includes a Pop! vinyl figure alongside a stylized version of a landmark building from the source material.

Other Funko products currently on the market include a variety of collectible toy lines such as Vinyl Soda, Vinyl Gold, Popsies, Ad Icons and stuffed Plushies made to resemble their stylized array of toys. Funko also owns Loungefly, a line of collectible mini-bags and purses that feature popular characters and designs from franchises including Harry Potter, Hello Kitty and Disney princesses, the latter of which are sold at official Disney stores and parks.

Funko product lines of the past that have since been discontinued or are no longer in production include Dorbz, VYNL, Rock Candy, Hikari, Spastik Plastik, Blox, FunkoVision, Funko Force, ReAction Figures, Wacky Wisecracks and Wacky Wobblers.

==== Chase variants ====
A chase variant is any Funko product within a series that is a rare variation on the original mold, originally at a ratio of 1/36 that has since increased to 1/6. This variance can be as simple as a color change, or as complex as a totally new mold. Common variances include different molds or character poses, a flocked (fuzzy) finish, glow in the dark (GITD), and translucence. They are randomly inserted into shipments, and are highly sought after by collectors, often reselling for much higher prices.

==== Convention exclusives ====
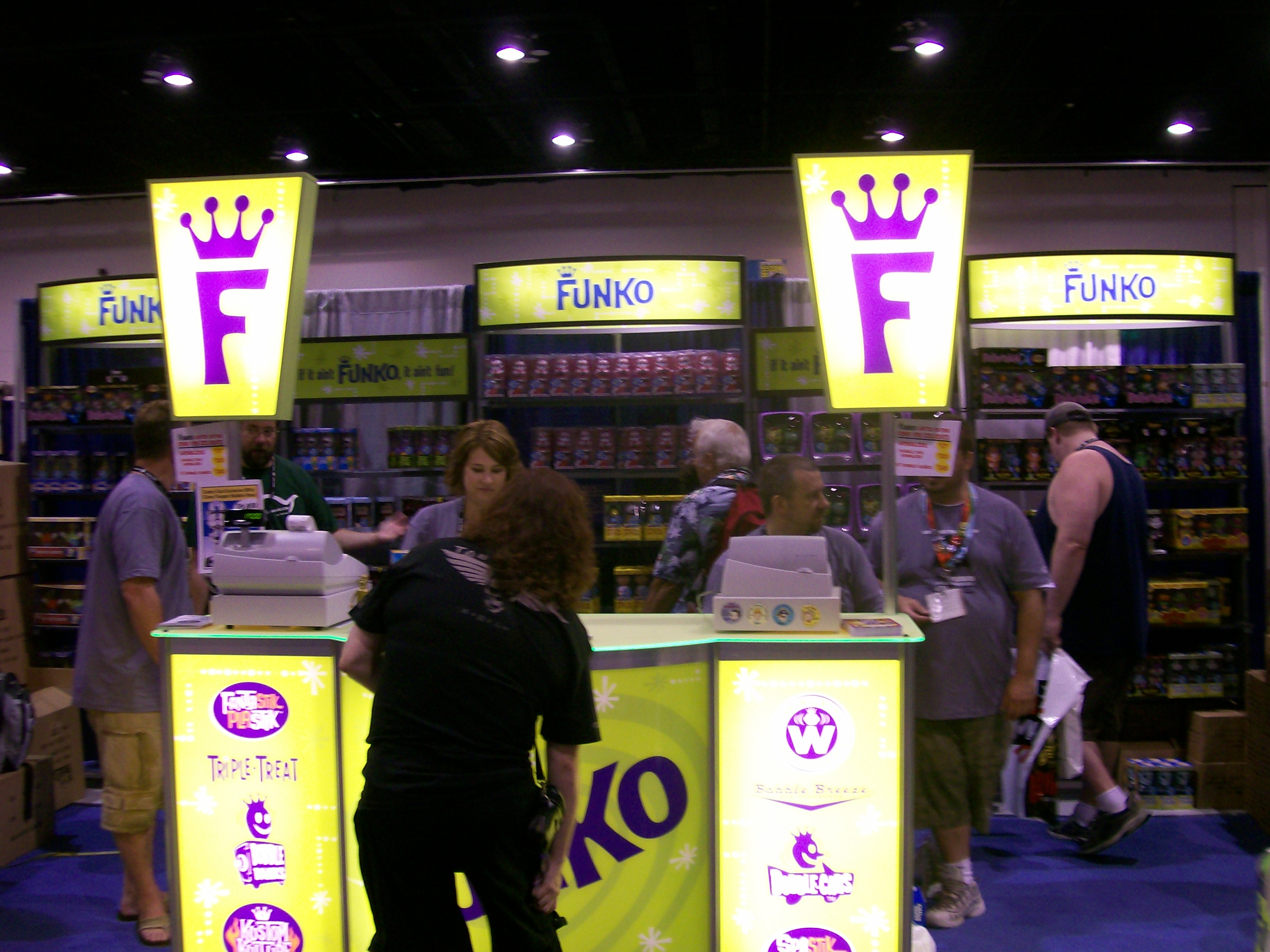
Funko booth at San Diego Comic-Con

Funko has been offering convention exclusive versions of their products at various conventions such as San Diego Comic-Con, Emerald City Comic Con, New York Comic Con, Fan Expo, Star Wars Celebration, and E3. This started in 2006 at San Diego Comic-Con.

==== Retail exclusives ====
Funko retail-exclusive variants are collectible figures available exclusively at select retailers such as Target, Walmart, Hot Topic, GameStop, Toys "R" Us and others. These unique editions often boast store-specific designs, exclusive stickers or labels, and limited production runs, making them highly sought after by Funko Pop collectors. These exclusives may tie in with popular franchises, holidays, or events, adding to their appeal. Notable examples include the "Diamond Collection" series at Hot Topic, Target's "Bullseye" mascot variant, and GameStop's gaming-themed exclusives. Another famous pop is the Geoffrey the Giraffe Funko Pop from 2017. Many new versions have been released and sold to this day from new Toys "R" Us stores, Macy’s, and Toysrus.com. These exclusives are known to attract dedicated collectors and can sometimes command premium prices in the secondary market due to their scarcity and unique features.

=== Bitty Pop! ===
At the London Toy Fair in January 2023, Funko announced a new line of Pop! vinyl figures: Bitty Pop! which are miniature versions of the Funko Pop! measuring just 1 inch in size. Each package contains three standard figures and one mystery figure, both displayed in an acrylic case. The Bitty Pop! are packaged in small Funko boxes. The initial Bitty Pop! line focuses on two popular franchises: Harry Potter and Disney.

=== Mystery Mini ===
The Mystery Mini series consists of a group of blind boxes that have a random character within, from a variety of series. Examples of Mystery Mini series themes including Netflix's Stranger Things, Blizzard Entertainment's Cute but Deadly, Disney Heroes and Villains, Horror Classics, Asphalt 9: Legends, Steven Universe, Teenage Mutant Ninja Turtles, Five Nights at Freddy's, Mary Poppins, Avengers: Infinity War, and Anime Heroes And Vehicles. The figures are styled differently than the other Funko products. Unlike the other Funko products, there are not usually convention exclusives, but some stores, such as Hot Topic and FYE, have carried exclusives.

=== Pops! With Purpose ===
The Pops! With Purpose figures support various philanthropic organizations such as The Breast Cancer Research Foundation, Rivit, Operation Homefront, and the It Gets Better Project. Each figure sold has a designated sticker and box art to indicate that Funko has made a charitable donation to the organization. The Funko Cares program includes monetary and product donations.

=== Funko Games ===
In February 2019, Funko acquired award-winning board game development studio Forrest-Pruzan Creative, including the design studio imprint Prospero Hall, forming Funko Games. Funko Games has begun publishing strategy games across different licenses, including their flagship game Funkoverse. As of 2024, Funko laid off all Funko Games employees, sold the assets of the studio (including those made before the Funko acquisition), and gave exclusive worldwide distribution of its board games and puzzles to Goliath Games.

=== NFTs ===
In August 2021, Funko launched a new line of digital collectibles, where collectors can buy Funko-themed non-fungible token (NFT) packs. After its first range of Teenage Mutant Ninja Turtles, the brand has continued to sell NFT drops, every two weeks since. Cards acquired this way can be traded through Funko's official portal Droppp IO.

== Business model ==
Funko has over 1,100 licenses with different companies. Another aspect of their business model is tracking the popularity of a certain item and knowing when to move on to a different character. Funko creates items that appeal to children and adults. This can be noted by their range of figures from Golden Girls to superheroes. Funko comes up with an initial design in 24 hours and can have a product from concept to shelf in 70 days. CCO Mariotti believes that the company's eagerness to gain so many licenses and have a range of products from music icons and video game characters to action heroes is what has made them succeed.

== Collector box subscriptions ==
In 2015, Funko and Marvel partnered to launch Marvel Collector Corps, a subscription box service featuring exclusive collectibles, apparel, and accessories. Boxes shipped every two months. It subsequently launched a subscription box service for Star Wars items called Smuggler's Bounty, a DC subscription box called Legion of Collectors, and a Disney subscription box called Disney Treasures.

== Related media ==
An animated film based on the Funko toys was reported to be in development at Warner Animation Group in January 2019. The film was announced as being in active development on September 16, 2019, with Lloyd Taylor set to write the script, Teddy Newton set to create the story, and Mark Dindal set to direct.

A game entitled Funko Fusion was announced to be in development in 2023, based on NBCUniversal IPs. Upon release, it received mixed reception from critics and was a commercial failure, leading to layoffs at the developer's company.

Additionally in 2021, a parody of the Funko Pop! line was featured in the immersive sim video game "Cruelty Squad", where it served as a symbol for consumerism, artificial scarcity and capitalism.

== See also ==
- Figma (toy)
- NECA
- Hot Toys
- Mezco Toyz
- McFarlane Toys
- Sideshow Collectibles
- Skylanders
- Nendoroid
- Youtooz
