= Sun Tower (Abu Dhabi) =

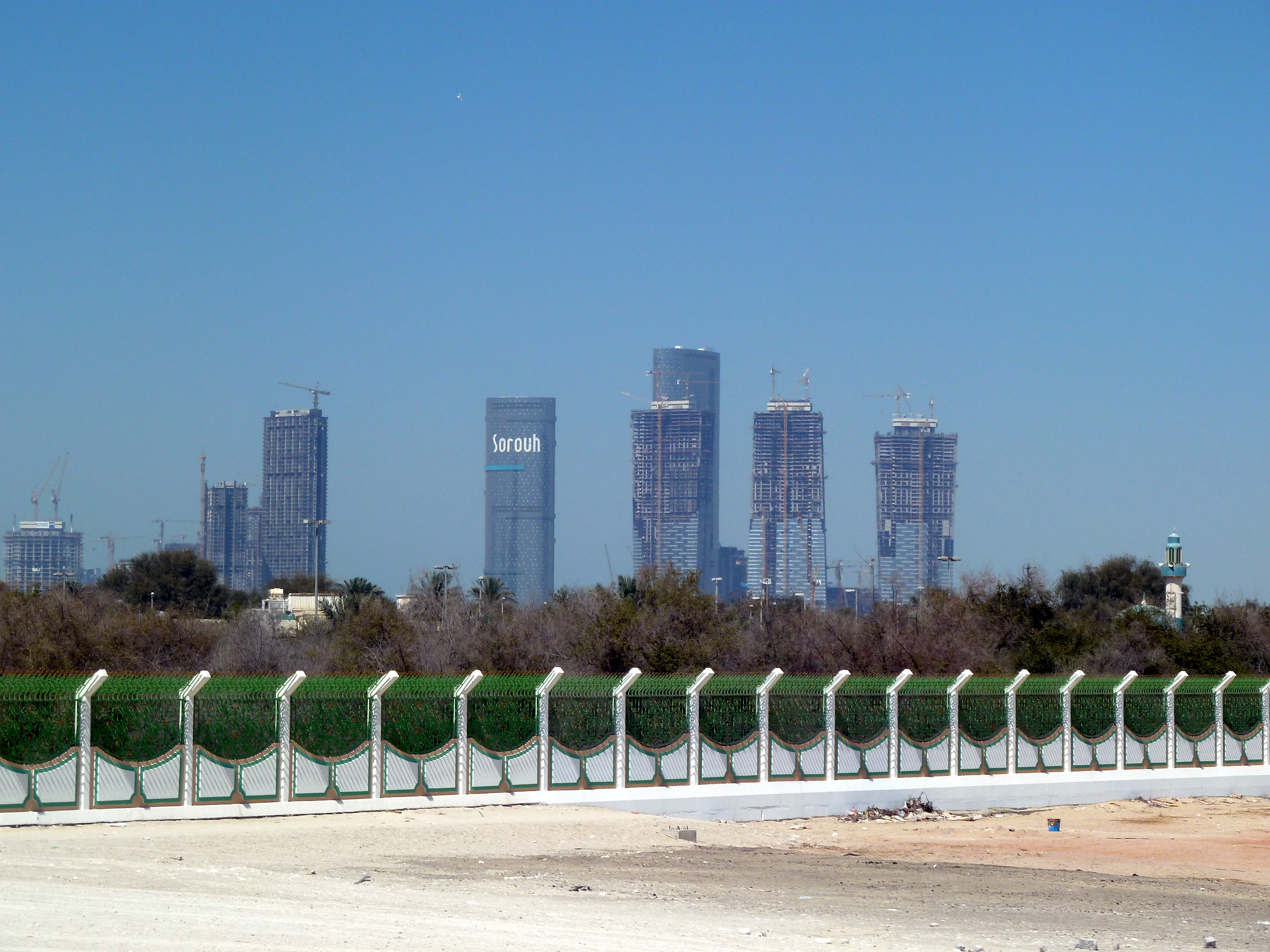
- Sun Tower (labeled "Sorouh")
- Interactive map of the Sun Tower area

General information
- Status: Completed
- Location: Shams Gate District, Al Reem Island, Abu Dhabi
- Coordinates: 24.4961°N 54.4068°E
- Completed: 2010

The Sun Tower is a 236.7-metre tall skyscraper on Al Reem Island in Abu Dhabi, the capital of the United Arab Emirates. It reached at the highest peak in August 2009.

Construction completed in 2010, and the Sun Tower has housed apartments and a shopping centre.

The structure is part of The Gate Shams Abu Dhabi complex, which comprises six other buildings. The tallest is the Sky Tower at 292.2 metres, followed by the four Gate Towers (238 metres each), the Sun Tower, and finally, the Arc at Gate Towers (84.6 metres).

The buildings were designed by the architectural firm Arquitectonica and feature load-bearing elements made of reinforced concrete.
