= List of islands of the United Arab Emirates =

Islands near the Strait of Hormuz

This is a list of islands of the United Arab Emirates.

- Abu Musa
- Al Fahid Island
- Al Futaisi
- Al Lulu Island
- Al Maryah Island
- Al Reem Island
- Dalma Island
- Das Island
- Dubai Islands
- Ghagha Island
- Greater and Lesser Tunbs
- Halat al Bahrani
- Jazirat Badiyah
- Saadiyat Island
- Sir Abu Nu'ayr
- Sir Bani Yas
- Snoopy Island
- The World Islands
- Yas Island
- Zirku Island
