= Shams Abu Dhabi =

Real estate development on Al Reem Island, Abu Dhabi, United Arab Emirates

Coordinates: 24°30′16.8″N 54°24′40.8″E

The Shams Abu Dhabi project will be developed on Reem Island in Abu Dhabi by Sorouh Real Estate and occupy approximately 25% of the island. It will occupy 1.32 million square metres (14.2×10^{6} sq ft), of which 90% will be dedicated to residential buildings and has a potential of developing 22,000 residential units which will house around 100,000 people whereas the rest will be available for commercial use and recreational facilities.

The entrance will be marked by The Gate Shams Abu Dhabi, which consists of 8 buildings. It will also contain one of the largest parks in the UAE covering an area of 1 million square metres (11×10^{6} sq ft). It will be linked to mainland Abu Dhabi by two bridges. It was developed in numerous phases and the first phase was expected to be completed by 2009 and the whole project by 2011.

== The Gate ==
The Gate Shams Abu Dhabi
- Interactive map of the The Gate Shams Abu Dhabi area

General information
- Location: Al Reem Island; Abu Dhabi; United Arab Emirates
- Completed: 2028

Design and construction
- Architect: Arquitectonica
- Developer: Sorouh Real Estate

Sky Tower in Shams Abu Dhabi development from Sorouh Real Estate, is a 389-metre (1,276 ft) tall super-tall skyscraper with 83 floors in Abu Dhabi, United Arab Emirates. It includes offices and residential complexes that are able to hold thousands of people.

The building resembles Marina Bay Sands in Singapore.
