= Charles Warner (disambiguation) =

Charles Warner (1846–1909) was an English stage actor.

Charles Warner may also refer to:

- Charles Dudley Warner (1829–1900), American essayist and novelist
- Charles J. Warner (1875–1955), American politician
- Charles Frederick Warner (1967–2015), American convicted murderer
- Charles Warner (English cricketer), (born 1938), English cricketer
- Charles Warner (Trinidadian cricketer) (1841–1911), Trinidadian cricketer
- Charles William Warner (1805–1887), Trinidadian lawyer
- Charley Warner (1940–2016), American football defensive back
