= Alfred Wise =

Alfred Wise may refer to:

- Alfred Roy Wise (1901–1974), British politician
- Alfred Gascoyne Wise (1854–1923), British barrister and colonial judge

== See also ==
- Alfie Wise (1942–2025), American film and television actor
