= Amiera AlHefeiti =

United Arab Emirati diplomat

- Born: Amiera Obaid AlHefeiti
- Citizenship: United Arab Emirates
- Education: United Arab Emirates University; Sorbonne University Abu Dhabi
- Occupation: diplomat
- Years active: 2011-present

Amiera Obaid AlHefeiti (Arabic: أميرة عبيد الحفيتي) is an Emirati diplomat, currently serving as the UAE Ambassador to the Kingdom of the Netherlands and Permanent Representative to the Organisation for the Prohibition of Chemical Weapons (OPCW). She previously served as Deputy Permanent Representative of the UAE to the United Nations.

== Education ==
AlHefeiti holds a bachelor’s degree in political science from the United Arab Emirates University and a master’s degree in international law, international relations, and diplomacy from Sorbonne University Abu Dhabi. She has undertaken training programs in diplomacy and international affairs at institutions including the Center for Strategic and International Studies (CSIS) in Washington, D.C., New York University, and the Harvard Kennedy School.

== Career ==
AlHefeiti began her career as a parliamentary researcher at the Federal National Council. She later worked as a research assistant at the Mohammed bin Rashid School of Government (formerly the Dubai School of Government). In January 2011, she joined the Ministry of Foreign Affairs and International Cooperation, where she served as an analyst in the Policy Planning Department. Her work focused on policy analysis and strategy development in areas such as relations with the Gulf Cooperation Council (GCC), Yemen, Iraq, and the United Kingdom, including the UAE–UK Taskforce, as well as issues related to human rights and women.

During her tenure as Third Secretary at the Permanent Mission of the United Arab Emirates to the United Nations, she served as Vice-President of the Bureau of the UN Women Executive Board in 2016, representing the Asia-Pacific Group. From June 2014 to April 2017, she was responsible for matters related to the Third Committee of the United Nations General Assembly, which addresses social, humanitarian, and human rights issues. She also handled the women and youth portfolios and contributed to the preparations for the UAE’s non-permanent membership of the United Nations Security Council for the 2022–2023 term.

From 2021 to 2024, AlHefeiti served as Deputy Permanent Representative of the United Arab Emirates to the United Nations in New York. In this role, she handled Security Council matters and legal issues, and also led the mission’s Political Affairs Section, where she was responsible for political reporting and coordination. She additionally served as the mission’s Political Coordinator during this period.

On 30 January 2025, AlHefeiti presented her credentials to King Willem-Alexander as the Ambassador of the United Arab Emirates to the Kingdom of the Netherlands at Noordeinde Palace. She subsequently presented her credentials as the UAE’s Permanent Representative to the Organisation for the Prohibition of Chemical Weapons (OPCW) in The Hague on 18 March 2025. On 10 April 2025, she represented the UAE before the International Court of Justice in response to allegations by the Sudanese Armed Forces.
