= Francis Gould =

Francis Gould may refer to:

- Francis Carruthers Gould, British caricaturist and political cartoonist
- Francis Gould (cricketer), English cricketer and British Army officer

== See also ==
- Frank Jay Gould, philanthropist and son of financier Jay Gould
