= William Wyatt (cricketer) =

English cricketer

Personal information
- Full name: William Wyatt
- Born: 12 November 1842; Islington, Middlesex, England
- Died: 1 March 1908 (aged 65); Scarborough, Yorkshire, England
- Batting: Unknown
- Bowling: Unknown

Domestic team information
- Years: Team
- 1864: Oxford University

Career statistics
Competition	First-class
Matches	3
Runs scored	3
Batting average	3.00
100s/50s	–/–
Top score	2*
Balls bowled	180
Wickets	5
Bowling average	36.00
5 wickets in innings	–
10 wickets in match	–
Best bowling	2/?
Catches/stumpings	–/–
- Source: Cricinfo, 1 June 2020

William Wyatt (12 November 1842 – 1 March 1908) was an English first-class cricketer and clergyman.

The son of The Reverend William Wyatt, he was born at Islington in November 1842. He was educated Repton School, before going up to Balliol College, Oxford. While studying at Oxford, he made three appearances in first-class cricket for Oxford University in 1864, playing twice against the Marylebone Cricket Club and once against Southgate. He took 5 wickets in his three matches.

After graduating from Oxford, Wyatt took holy orders in the Church of England in 1869. His first ecclesiastical post was as curate of Melton Ross in Lincolnshire from 1869–74, before moving to Herefordshire to take up the post of vicar of Hope under Dinmore, which he held from 1874–81. He returned to Lincolnshire in 1881 to take up the post of rector at Broughton. He was rector there until his death at Scarborough in March 1908.
