= Martin Rowley =

English golf caddie

Martin Rowley is a former professional golf caddie. He was both secretary and chairman of the European Tour Caddies Association.

== Biography ==
Rowley attended Repton school. He was a regular feature on the PGA European Tour and was at Ian Woosnam's side during his successful captaincy at the 2006 Ryder Cup.

Rowley worked with Ryder Cup players Eamonn Darcy, Ken Brown, Darren Clarke and Miguel Ángel Jiménez. He caddied for Ian Garbutt and was behind the website golfnavigation.co.uk.
