= Alghadeer =

Alghadeer الغدير
- Community
- Alghadeer development logo
- Interactive map of Alghadeer
- Coordinates: 24.485977°N 54.374685°E
- Country: United Arab Emirates
- Emirate: Abu Dhabi
- City: Abu Dhabi
- Alghadeer is currently under construction.

Alghadeer is a three million m^{2} (thirty-two million sq ft) property development on the eastern border of the Emirate of Abu Dhabi, on the border between the city and Dubai. It is part of the wider Saih Al Sidirah development. It is to be a fully self-contained community. The community includes a mosque, retail space, parks and an international school.

It was launched in October 2007 by Sorouh Real Estate at Cityscape Dubai 2007. In May 2009 some elements of the project have been adjusted due to the challenging market conditions. These changes includes project restructuring along with revised payments.

Enabling work began in October 2008 and is to be completed on schedule by June 2009. In March 2009, a ninth construction mock-up villa was completed at alghadeer. The first phase is to be delivered to residents in 2012.
