= Sorouh Real Estate =

Real estate developer

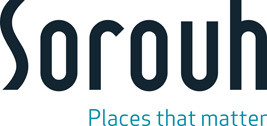
- Company type: Publicly listed company
- Industry: Real estate
- Founded: 2003
- Defunct: June 30, 2013
- Fate: Merged with Aldar Properties
- Headquarters: Abu Dhabi, United Arab Emirates
- Key people: Saeed Eid Al Ghafli (Chairman), Mohamed Khalaf Al Mazrouei (Vice Chairman )
- Number of employees: 300
- Website: sorouh.com

Sorouh Real Estate PJSC of Abu Dhabi was one of the largest real estate developers in the UAE with over AED 70 billion (US$19 billion) worth of projects under development. In June 2013, it merged with Aldar Properties.

Sorouh developed commercial and residential properties. The master developments associated with Sorouh include Shams Abu Dhabi, Alghadeer, Lulu Island, and Saraya. Sorouh also developed entire residential communities, including Golf Gardens, Khalidiya Village, Sas Al Nakhl Village and Al Oyoun Village. With Tala Tower they also had a single building in their portfolio, a 49-floor apartment building in the Marina Square area of Al Reem Island.
