= Jason Windsor (businessman) =

British Businessman (born 1972)

Personal information
- Full name: Jason Michael Windsor
- Born: 7 August 1972 (age 54); Chesterfield, Derbyshire, England
- Batting: Right-handed
- Bowling: Right-arm fast-medium

Domestic team information
- Years: Team
- 1995: Oxford University

Career statistics
Competition	First-class
Matches	2
Runs scored	28
Batting average	14.00
100s/50s	–/–
Top score	14
Balls bowled	250
Wickets	3
Bowling average	31.00
5 wickets in innings	–
10 wickets in match	–
Best bowling	3/51
Catches/stumpings	–/–
- Source: Cricinfo, 7 March 2020

Jason Michael Windsor (born 7 August 1972) is an English businessman and former first-class cricketer.

== Cricket career ==
Windsor was born at Chesterfield in August 1972. He was educated at Repton School, before going up to Worcester College, Oxford. While studying at Oxford, he made two appearances in first-class cricket for Oxford University in 1995 against Derbyshire and Middlesex. He scored 28 runs in his two matches, with a high score of 14, while with his right-arm fast-medium bowling, he took 3 wickets.

== Business career ==
Windsor joined Aviva in 2010 and rose to the position of chief financial officer (CFO) which he held from 2019 to 2022. He served a year as CFO of Persimmon before taking the same position at Aberdeen Group plc in 2023.

In May 2024, he became interim chief executive officer following the announcement of Stephen Bird's departure. He was appointed Group CEO in September 2024.

Windsor previously spent 15 years at Morgan Stanley in London and Singapore, latterly as a managing director within its investment banking division.
