= Sorbonne University Abu Dhabi =

French and English-speaking university in Abu Dhabi

Coordinates: 24°29′20″N 54°24′44″E

- Sorbonne University Abu Dhabi
- Other name: SUAD
- Former name: Paris-Sorbonne University Abu Dhabi
- Motto: "A bridge between civilisations"
- Type: Public
- Established: May 30, 2006
- Parent institution: Sorbonne University
- Accreditation: French Ministry of Education; UAE Ministry of Education
- Affiliations: Sorbonne University; Paris Cité University
- Chair: Reem Al Hashimy
- Chancellor: Prof Nathalie Martial-Braz (For now)
- Students: 3,000+
- Location: Abu Dhabi, United Arab Emirates
- Campus: 23 acres (9.3 ha)
- Colors
- Nickname: Foxes
- Mascot: Foxy
- Website: www.sorbonne.ae

Sorbonne University Abu Dhabi (SUAD), established in 2006, is a public higher education institution located in Abu Dhabi, United Arab Emirates. The university was founded under the patronage of His Highness Sheikh Mohammed bin Zayed Al Nahyan, President of the United Arab Emirates and Ruler of Abu Dhabi, through a partnership between Sorbonne Université in Paris and the Government of Abu Dhabi, under the administrative oversight of the Abu Dhabi Department of Education and Knowledge (ADEK). Its academic programmes are provided by Sorbonne Université and Université Paris Cité.

== History ==
Sorbonne University Abu Dhabi was established in 2006 as a branch of Paris-Sorbonne University through a partnership between Paris-Sorbonne University and the Government of Abu Dhabi. It was Sorbonne’s first campus outside of France.

It opened at a temporary campus in Umm Al Nar on 18 October 2006 and enrolled more than 150 students during the 2006-07 academic year. The foundation stone for the university’s permanent campus on AI Reem Island was laid in January 2008.

In December 2009, the university relocated to its purpose-built campus on AI Reem Island, comprising approximately 93,000 square metres of teaching, recreational and residential facilities. The campus was officially inaugurated on 13 February 2011.

Following the merger of Paris-Sorbonne University and Pierre and Marie Curie University in 2018, the institution adopted the name Sorbonne University Abu Dhabi, reflecting the creation of Sorbonne Université.

In October 2022, the Abu Dhabi Executive Council restructured the university’s Board of Trustees, appointing a new board chaired by Reem Ebrahim Al Hashimy.

== Academic programmes ==
SUAD's academic offerings are divided into three schools: the School of Arts and Humanities, the School of Law, Economics and Business, and the School of Data, Science and Engineering. The university offers foundation, undergraduate and postgraduate programmes taught in French and English.

Academic programmes are delivered by Sorbonne Université in the fields of arts, humanities, science and engineering, and by Université Paris Cité in the fields of law, business and economics. SUAD degree programmes follow the European Credit Transfer and Accumulation System (ECTS).

=== School of Arts and Humanities ===
The School of Arts and Humanities offers programmes taught in both French and English. Undergraduate programmes taught in French include degrees in Business and Foreign Languages, Humanities Applied to Public and Cultural Affairs (HAPAC), Geography and Planning, as well as History with a focus on International Relations, or History of Art and Archaeology, Philosophy and Sociology. The programme also offers an intensive Foundation Year in French.

Postgraduate programmes taught in English include Social Research and Data Analysis for Global Societies; Arts and Heritage, with concentrations in Museum and Curatorial Studies, Archaeology and Cultural Heritage, and Art Market; Marketing, Communication and Media, as well as Urban Planning and Development, with a focus on urban innovation and sustainability.

=== School of Law, Economics and Business ===
The School of Law, Economics and Business offers French-language undergraduate programmes in Economics & Management, and a programme in Law.

English-language postgraduate programmes include Business & Foreign Languages, Banking with Finance and Fin Tech, International Business Transactions and Arbitration, International Law with Spaces and Sovereignty, and also Sustainable Environmental Engineering & Law.

=== School of Data, Science and Engineering ===
The School of Data, Science and Engineering offers foundation Programmes in Sciences and Records Management & Archival Science, together with undergraduate programmes in Physics with focus in Quantu Technologoies, Mathematics with a specialisation in Data Science for Artificial Intelligence, and Records Management and Archival Science. All programmes are taught in English.

=== International exchange ===
Incoming exchange students may apply through nomination by one of SUAD's partner universities, while undergraduate exchange students are required to have completed at least two semesters before commencing their studies at the university.

SUAD maintains an international network of partner institutions for student exchange and academic collaboration, including Sciences Po Paris, Université Paris Cité, Tsinghua University, Wuhan University, the University of Pisa, the University of Malta and the University of Bergamo, among others.

In 2025, SUAD and Sciences Po launched a student exchange programme allowing up to ten students from each university to study abroad during each academic year.

== Accreditation ==
Sorbonne University Abu Dhabi (SUAD) operates under the administration of the Department of Education and Knowledge (ADEK) and the academic leadership of Sorbonne Université in collaboration with Université Paris Cité.

The degrees are awarded by Sorbonne Université and Université Paris Cité. All SUAD programmes are evaluated by the Higher Council for the Evaluation of Research and Higher Education (HCERES), with each programme undergoing a comprehensive evaluation every four to five years, and accredited by the French Ministry of Higher Education, Research and Innovation. Furthermore, all programmes are accredited by the Commission for Academic Accreditation (CAA). These degrees are recognised worldwide.

== Research and innovation ==
SAFIR Institute (Sorbonne Abu dhabi For Innovation and Research)

Research at SUAD is carried out within SAFIR Institute. It focuses its research on the areas of Sorbonne Université and Université Paris Cité, as well as the fields of the professors based in the Abu Dhabi campus. The research strategy, outlined in the strategic plan 2024-2028, is aligned with Abu Dhabi and Abu Dhabi’s Vision 2030 to support national priorities for the implementation of the UN Sustainable Development Goals.

Earlier, in 2020, the Sorbonne Centre for Artificial Intelligence opened at SUAD. At the same time, the university signed a cooperation agreement with Total E&P and Thales International to establish an industrial chair in artificial intelligence.

Since October 2024, SAFIR hosts seven research centers focusing on seven strategic research themes:

1. Artificial Intelligence and Digital Policy
2. Heritage and Material Science
3. Environment and Sustainable Development
4. Global Societies, Cultures, Cities and Arts
5. Applied Mathematics, Statistics and Data Science
6. Humanities, Languages and Education
7. Health and care

The research activities at SUAD are conducted in close collaboration with International research institutes and labs in France and in the Gulf region, along with local and international industrial and governmental stakeholders (Veolia, EAD, Anwar Gargash Diplomatic Academy, National archives....).

In alignment with Sorbonne Université’s areas, two institutes have been established in Abu Dhabi to support research on artificial intelligence and marine issues.

SUAD announced the Institute for Oceans at COP28 in December 2023. The Ocean Institute was established in 2024 to develop interdisciplinary and transnational research on ocean issues.

Several labs in France and in the region have an antenna, delegate staff at SUAD and active collaborations around research projects.

== Campus and facilities ==
Located on Al Reem Island, SUAD's 93,000-square-metre campus features modern classrooms, laboratories, auditoriums, and a library housing the largest collection of French literature in the Gulf region. The campus also includes on-site student housing and a sports complex featuring a large sports hall, gymnasium, dance studio, climbing walls, a martial arts room and multiple sports courts. The on-campus residences provide accommodation for up to 500 students, with 250 places allocated to male students and 250 to female students, and individual rooms arranged across multiple floors. The campus developed through a public-private partnership with Abu Dhabi education authorities, covering the design, construction, financing and non-academic operation of the campus.
