= Jazirat Badiyah =

- Interactive map of Jazirat Badiyah

Geography
- Coordinates: 25.428623°N 56.368756°E
- Highest elevation: 61 m (200 ft)

Administration
- United Arab Emirates
- Fujairah

Jazirat Badiyah (Arabic: جزيرة البدية, romanized: Jazīrat Badīyah) is an island or peninsula near Al Badiyah and Zubara in the Emirate of Fujairah, United Arab Emirates.

The terrain rises to 61 meters.
