= Charles Warner (English cricketer) =

English cricketer (born 1938)

Personal information
- Full name: Charles Simon Warner
- Born: 19 November 1938 (age 87); Liverpool, Lancashire, England
- Batting: Left-handed

Domestic team information
- Years: Team
- 1962: Oxford University

Career statistics
Competition	First-class
Matches	7
Runs scored	365
Batting average	26.07
100s/50s	–/2
Top score	77
Catches/stumpings	2/–
- Source: Cricinfo, 9 April 2020

Charles Simon Warner (born 19 November 1938) is an English former first-class cricketer.

Warner was born at Liverpool in November 1938. He was educated at Repton School, before going up to Keble College, Oxford. While studying at Oxford, he played first-class cricket for Oxford University in 1962, making seven appearances. Playing as a batsman, Warner scored a total of 365 runs in his seven matches, at an average of 26.07 and a high score of 77, which came against Essex. In club cricket, he played for Liverpool Cricket Club for twenty years between 1957 and 1977.
