= Francis Gould (cricketer) =

English cricketer and British Army officer

Personal information
- Full name: Francis Hunt Gould
- Born: 16 October 1881; Ross-on-Wye, Herefordshire, England
- Died: 16 June 1915 (aged 33); Armentières, Nord, France
- Batting: Unknown

Domestic team information
- Years: Team
- 1913/14: Europeans

Career statistics
Competition	First-class
Matches	1
Runs scored	31
Batting average	31.00
100s/50s	–/–
Top score	27*
Catches/stumpings	1/–
- Source: ESPNcricinfo, 9 October 2020

Francis Hunt Gould (16 October 1881 – 6 June 1915) was an English first-class cricketer and British Army officer.

The son of a British Army captain, he was born at Ross-on-Wye in October 1881. He was educated at Repton School. After completing his education, he enlisted in the British Army and was commissioned as a second lieutenant in the 3rd (Hampshire Militia) Battalion, Hampshire Regiment, in March 1900; both his parents were from Andover in Hampshire. He was promoted to lieutenant in June 1902, and transferred to a posting with the regular army in the Middlesex Regiment in January 1903, at which point he returned to the rank of second lieutenant. He was re-promoted to lieutenant in December 1905. Gould later served with the regiment in British India, where he played club cricket for the Ballygunge district of Calcutta. He made a single appearance in first-class cricket while in India for the Europeans cricket team against the Hindus at Poona in the 1913/14 Bombay Presidency Match. Batting twice in the match, he was dismissed for 4 runs by Palwankar Baloo in the Europeans first innings, while in their second innings he was unbeaten on 27.

Seven months after his promotion to captain in January 1914 the First World War began. He returned home with the Middlesex Regiment, which was immediately sent to the front in France. Gould was killed on 6 June 1915 in an accident at Armentières. He is buried at the Cite Bonjean Military Cemetery.
