= Alfred Gascoyne Wise =

British lawyer and colonial judge (1854–1923)

- Born: 15 August 1854; Colombo, Ceylon
- Died: 25 June 1923 (aged 68)
- Education: Trinity College, Cambridge
- Occupations: Barrister and colonial judge
- Children: 2

Alfred Gascoyne Wise (15 August 1854 – 25 June 1923) was a British barrister and colonial judge. He was a puisne judge of the Supreme Court of Hong Kong from 1895 to 1909.

== Early life and education ==
Wise was born on 15 August 1854 in Colombo, Ceylon, the son of Alfred Wise, a well known planter. He was educated at Repton School and Trinity College, Cambridge. He was called to the Bar by Lincoln’s Inn in 1878.

== Career ==
Wise joined the Colonial Legal Service, and at the age of 28 went to Hong Kong. After serving as Clerk to the Chief Justice, in 1884, he was appointed police magistrate and coroner. In 1892, he became Registrar, Official Administrator, Official Trustee, Registrar of Companies, and Registrar in the Colonial Court of Admiralty. From 1895 to 1909 he served as puisne judge of the Supreme Court of Hong Kong. He served on two occasions as acting Attorney-General, Hong Kong (1895 and 1902), and twice as acting Chief Justice, Hong Kong (June 1901–March 1902, and September 1907).

== Personal life and death ==
Wise married Augusta Nugent in 1894, and they had two sons. While in Hong Kong he took a great interest in sports, particularly boxing and frequently refereed at matches.

Wise died on 25 June 1923, aged 68.
