= Francis Habgood =

British police officer

The Honourable Sir Francis Habgood QPM DL

Chief Constable of Thames Valley Police
- In office April 2015 – April 2019
- Preceded by: Sara Thornton
- Succeeded by: John Campbell

Personal details
- Born: Francis John Stapylton Habgood; 19 November 1964 (age 61)
- Citizenship: United Kingdom
- Education: Chorister School, Durham; Repton School; Newcastle University; University of Cambridge

Sir Francis John Stapylton Habgood QPM DL (born 19 November 1964) is a retired senior British police officer. He was the Chief Constable of Thames Valley Police. He was appointed in April 2015. He is also a visiting fellow at Lady Margaret Hall, University of Oxford. He holds the Queen's Police Medal.

His final day as Chief Constable of Thames Valley Police was 22 March 2019, retiring at the age of 54 after having served four years in the post, 15 years within that force, and more than 32 years in total within the police service.

== Early life and education ==
Habgood was born on 19 November 1964 in Jedburgh, Scotland. His father was John Habgood, an Anglican priest who would later rise to become Archbishop of York and a life peer. He was educated at the Chorister School, Durham, and Repton School in Derbyshire. He studied mechanical engineering at Newcastle University (BSc) and applied criminology the University of Cambridge (Diploma).

== Policing career ==
Habgood first served with West Yorkshire Police which he joined in 1987.

Habgood joined Thames Valley Police in January 2004 as Assistant Chief Constable (Specialist Operations). He was promoted to Deputy Chief Constable in October 2008. In February 2016, it was announced that he had also been appointed a visiting Fellow of Lady Margaret Hall, Oxford.

He was knighted in the 2020 New Year Honours for services to policing.

== Later life ==
Since 2019, Habgood has been an independent chair of the Buckinghamshire Safeguarding Children Board and the Buckinghamshire Safeguarding Adults Board.

== Family ==
Francis Habgood is the son of Lord Habgood, the former Archbishop of York, and is therefore entitled to the honorific "The Honourable". He is the grandson of Lt.-Col. Arthur Henry Habgood RAMC and Vera Chetwynd-Stapylton.

Habgood is married to Dr. Nicolette Tamsin Campbell, and they have two sons.

== Honours ==
In 2020, he was appointed a deputy lieutenant (DL) for Buckinghamshire.

Ribbon	Description	Notes
	Knight Bachelor	2020 New Year Honours List
	Queen's Police Medal (QPM)	2012
	Queen Elizabeth II Golden Jubilee Medal	2002; UK version of this medal
	Queen Elizabeth II Diamond Jubilee Medal	2012; UK version of this medal
	Police Long Service and Good Conduct Medal	
