= Reem Mall =

Shopping mall in Abu Dhabi

- ريم مول

- A view of the mall on the second floor along with an accompanied view of "Snow Abu Dhabi".
- Location: Al Reem Island, Abu Dhabi
- Coordinates: 24°29′18″N 54°24′2″E
- Address: Hazza Bin Zayed the First Street, Abdullah Omran Taryam Street - Abu Dhabi
- Opened: 16 February 2023
- Developer: Al Farwaniya Property Developments
- Num. of stores: 400+ stores
- Floor area: 2,800,000 square feet (260,000 m^{2})
- Floors: 5 (excluding podium parking & VIP room)
- Parking: Approximately 6,800 spaces
- Website: reemmall.ae

Reem Mall (Arabic: ريم مول) is a shopping mall located in Al Reem Island, Abu Dhabi. The mall will feature 400+ international and local store brands, approximately 85 restaurants, & "Snow Abu Dhabi", the first-ever indoor snow park in the capital & the second to open in the United Arab Emirates.

The mall cost $1.2 billion to construct. It has a retail space of more than 190,000 square meters (2,000,000 square feet), with a car park having approximately 6,800 spaces. It will also have an on-premises logistics hub that allows store-to-door delivery anywhere in the UAE (up to 24 hours) and across the GCC (up to 72 hours), which is the first time it has been applied to a mall.

== Construction ==
In 2017, the mall started construction and was completed in the late 2020s. The construction and development was led by Al Farwaniya Property Developments, with the lead contractor being Itinera Ghantoot, and the interior fit-out contractor being JC Maclean International. The size of the mall is nearly 260,000 square meters (2.8 million square feet). The mall had a soft opening on February 16, 2023.

== Snow Abu Dhabi (snow park) ==
Snow Abu Dhabi is a snow park under the ownership of the Majid Al Futtaim Group. The snow park features 12 rides and 17 attractions across the snow park with the temperature of −2 °C (28 °F) and with the snow depth of 50 cm (20 in).
