= Al Reem Island =

Island in Abu Dhabi, United Arab Emirates

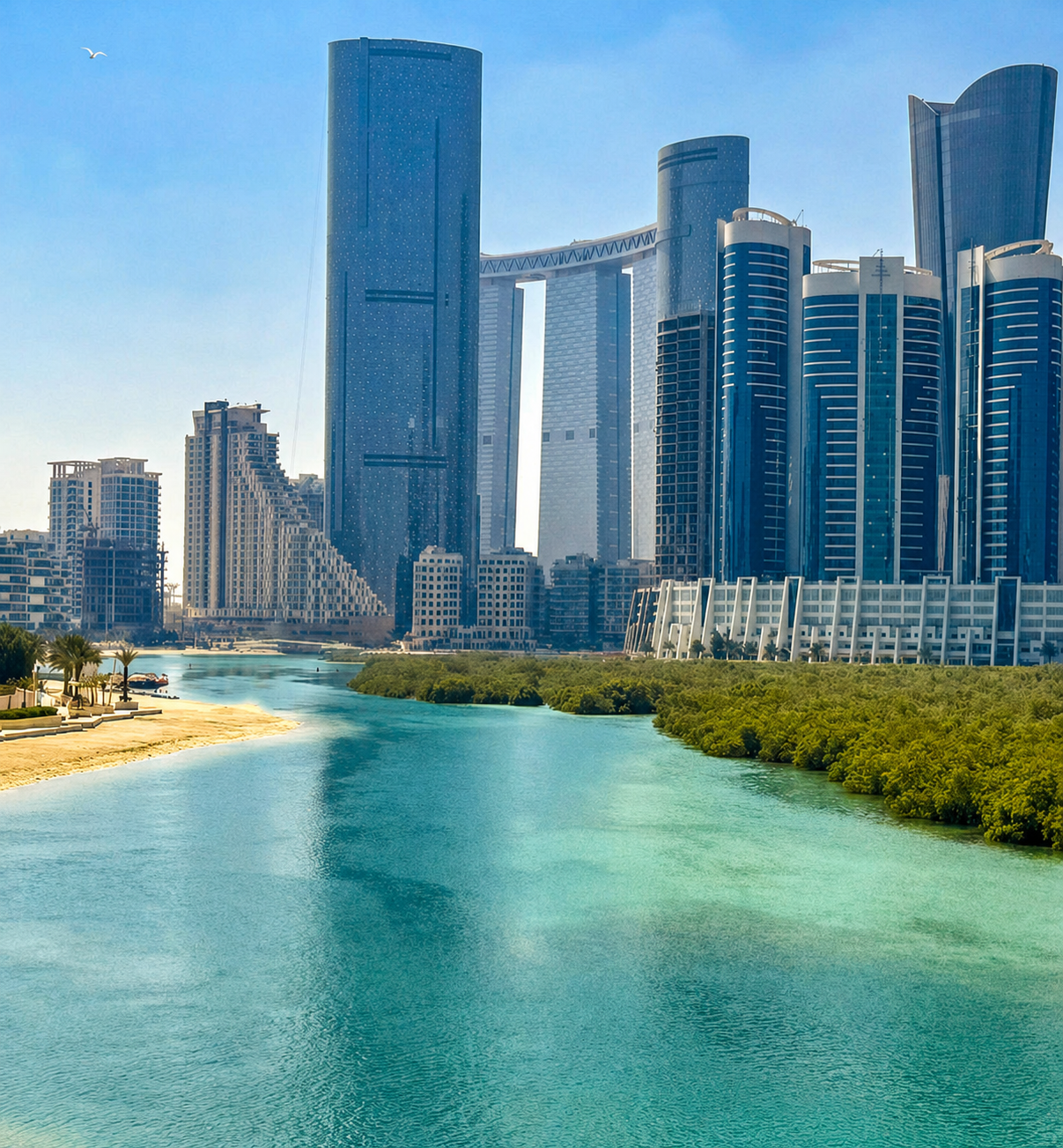
- Al Reem Island skyline and mangroves seen on the northern side of the island

Geography
- Location: Abu Dhabi, Emirate of Abu Dhabi
- Coordinates: 24.493°N 54.407°E
- Area: 8.8 km^{2} (3.4 sq mi)

Administration
- United Arab Emirates

Demographics
- Population: 59,725 (2024)

Al Reem Island (Arabic: جزيرة الريم), commonly known as Reem Island, is a natural island 600 metres (2,000 ft) off the coast of Abu Dhabi Island. Developed since the mid-2000s as a high-density mixed-use district, it is now largely built out with residential towers and commercial uses. Since April 2023 it has formed part of the Abu Dhabi Global Market (ADGM) jurisdiction. The Department of Culture and Tourism, lists Al Reem Island among the emirate's principal areas for visitor accommodation, alongside Saadiyat Island, the Corniche, and Al Maryah Island. The 2024 census recorded 59,725 usual residents.

== History ==
Before large-scale construction, Al Reem Island was an undeveloped natural island of sand and mangrove forest off Abu Dhabi's northeastern coast. It was also known locally as Abu Al Shuoom.

The Abu Dhabi government announced plans in late 2004 to develop the island as Reem Island, with an estimated investment of Dh35 billion. Three master developers: Tamouh Investments (about 60 per cent of the project), Sorouh Real Estate, and Al Reem Investments were assigned separate districts. In February 2006 the first major residential sales phase, marketed as Pearl of the Emirates, opened apartments to foreign buyers on extendable 99-year leasehold terms, among the earliest large-scale expatriate sales in the capital. Early marketing also used names such as The Pearl and Emirates Pearl Island.

Building work from 2005 onward substantially altered the island's ecology. By 2011 the Environment Agency of Abu Dhabi (EAD) reported that more than half of Al Reem Island's mangrove cover had been lost since development began in 2005, part of wider mangrove pressure from Reem and Saadiyat Island projects. In August 2012 EAD halted an unauthorised clearing of about 60,000 m² of mangroves intended to widen the northern channel by 75 m, requiring the unnamed developer to submit a mangrove management plan and fund compensatory replanting. Mangroves remain along parts of the northern shoreline.

The global financial crisis slowed the island's first tower phases. Sorouh and Tamouh delayed handovers in 2010 while authorities certified completed high-rises, but Sorouh began handing over the Sun and Sky towers in the first quarter of 2011. Sun and Sky, with Tamouh's Marina Square, were among the first large projects on the island and among the first in Abu Dhabi to offer non-Emirati buyers freehold apartments. Sky Tower in Shams Abu Dhabi was completed in 2010 at 292.2 metres (959 ft) and, for a time, ranked among the city's tallest buildings.

Sorouh Real Estate merged with Aldar Properties in June 2013, consolidating Sorouh's Shams Abu Dhabi masterplan and Gate-area assets under Aldar. Construction accelerated after the early delays; by 2021 more than 100 towers had been completed on the island.

UAE Cabinet Decision No. 41 of 2023 brought the island into the Abu Dhabi Global Market jurisdiction from 24 April 2023.

== Geography and connectivity ==
Al Reem Island covers roughly 8.8 square kilometres (3.4 sq mi). It lies in the capital's northeastern island group, about 600 metres (2,000 ft) off Abu Dhabi Island, with road bridges to Saadiyat Island's Cultural District and Al Maryah Island. The main districts are Shams Abu Dhabi (Gate, Sun and Sky Towers, Shams Boutik), Marina Square (Tamouh), Najmat (GEMS World Academy), and the Makers District on the waterfront. Most housing is in high-rise apartment towers. The 2024 census recorded 59,725 usual residents in the Al Reem Island district, up about 8 per cent from 55,225 in 2023, a population density of roughly 18,000. A 2015 master plan from the island's developers said the island could eventually hold more than 210,000 people.

Walkways, canal-side promenades, and cycle paths link the tower districts along the mangrove shoreline and waterfront. Aldar reported in 2017 that more than 23 km (14 mi) of walkways and 3.65 km (2.3 mi) of promenades were nearing completion, including a public beach overlooking the mangroves and a 2.4 km (1.5 mi) canal through Shams Abu Dhabi crossed by ten bridges; As of 2019, beach and canal-side paths formed an interconnected route of more than five kilometres.

By road, the island is linked to Abu Dhabi Island, the mainland, and neighbouring islands through bridges and highway connections. The Umm Yifeenah Bridge, opened in February 2023, is an 11-kilometre (7 mi) highway link from Al Reem Island across Umm Yifeenah Island to mainland Abu Dhabi, and the first phase of the Mid-Island Parkway, which is planned to connect Al Reem Island, Saadiyat Island, Al Raha Beach, and Khalifa City by 2028. In March 2026 two marine bridges opened on the island: one linking the Tamouh (Marina Square) and Shams Abu Dhabi districts, with pedestrian walkways and cycle paths, and another providing a direct route from Al Reem to Saadiyat Island and the mainland highway network east of the capital, allowing motorists to bypass central Abu Dhabi Island. Larger shopping is mostly at Reem Mall.

== Residential developments ==
Reportage Properties, Modon Holding, and SAAS Properties are among the later developers that have added residential towers and communities on the island since the mid-2000s master-plan phases. Modon's Reem Hills is a villa development on the island's periphery, and SAAS Properties has built several branded towers along the canal and mangrove waterfront.

== ADGM jurisdiction ==
On Al Reem Island, ADGM applies English common law through its own regulator, Registration Authority, and courts. Together with Al Maryah Island, the expanded district covers about 14,380,000 m^{2} (154,785,032 sq ft) (1,438 hectares). ADGM Courts exercise jurisdiction over civil and commercial matters on both islands.

New businesses on the island have required an ADGM commercial licence since 1 November 2023; existing Abu Dhabi Department of Economic Development licensees had until 31 December 2024 to obtain ADGM licences. From 1 January 2025, the Registration Authority took over real-property registration on Al Reem Island under the Real Property Regulations 2024, with transfers, leases, and off-plan sales processed through the AccessRP digital platform rather than Abu Dhabi Municipality systems.

ADGM reported that more than 1,100 entities were operating under its jurisdiction on the island following the integration.

== Education ==
Several international nurseries and schools operate within the island's residential districts, including Shams Abu Dhabi, Marina Square, and Najmat, alongside the surrounding apartment towers. Repton School Abu Dhabi, an affiliate of the UK Repton School, opened in phases from 2013 to 2014; the Department of Education and Knowledge (ADEK) rated its Rose Campus Outstanding in 2024–25. GEMS World Academy Abu Dhabi moved to a Najmat campus in 2022, and Nord Anglia International School Abu Dhabi opened in August 2023. Sorbonne University Abu Dhabi also maintains an undergraduate and graduate campus on the island.

== Healthcare ==
Reem Hospital, a multi-specialty and post-acute rehabilitation hospital with more than 200 beds, opened on the island in 2020. It holds Joint Commission International and Commission on Accreditation of Rehabilitation Facilities accreditations. Burjeel Day Surgery Center, in the podium of The Arc tower at Shams Abu Dhabi, has provided outpatient and day-surgery care since 2017.

== Retail, parks, and recreation ==
Shams Boutik in the Sun and Sky Towers has neighbourhood shopping, including a Waitrose supermarket, pharmacies, and cafés. Reem Mall opened on 30 May 2024 at a reported cost of $1.3 billion. The mall covers about 186,000 square metres (2,002,087 sq ft) with around 400 shops, about 85 restaurants, a Vox Cinemas multiplex, a Carrefour hypermarket, and Snow Abu Dhabi, an indoor snow park.

Aldar built Reem Central Park at a reported cost of AED 250 million. The park opened in December 2018 and is about one million square feet across the width of the island. It has a skate park, sports courts, playgrounds, a canal walk, a city beach, a lawn, food outlets, and a mosque for 2,000 worshippers. Entry is free.

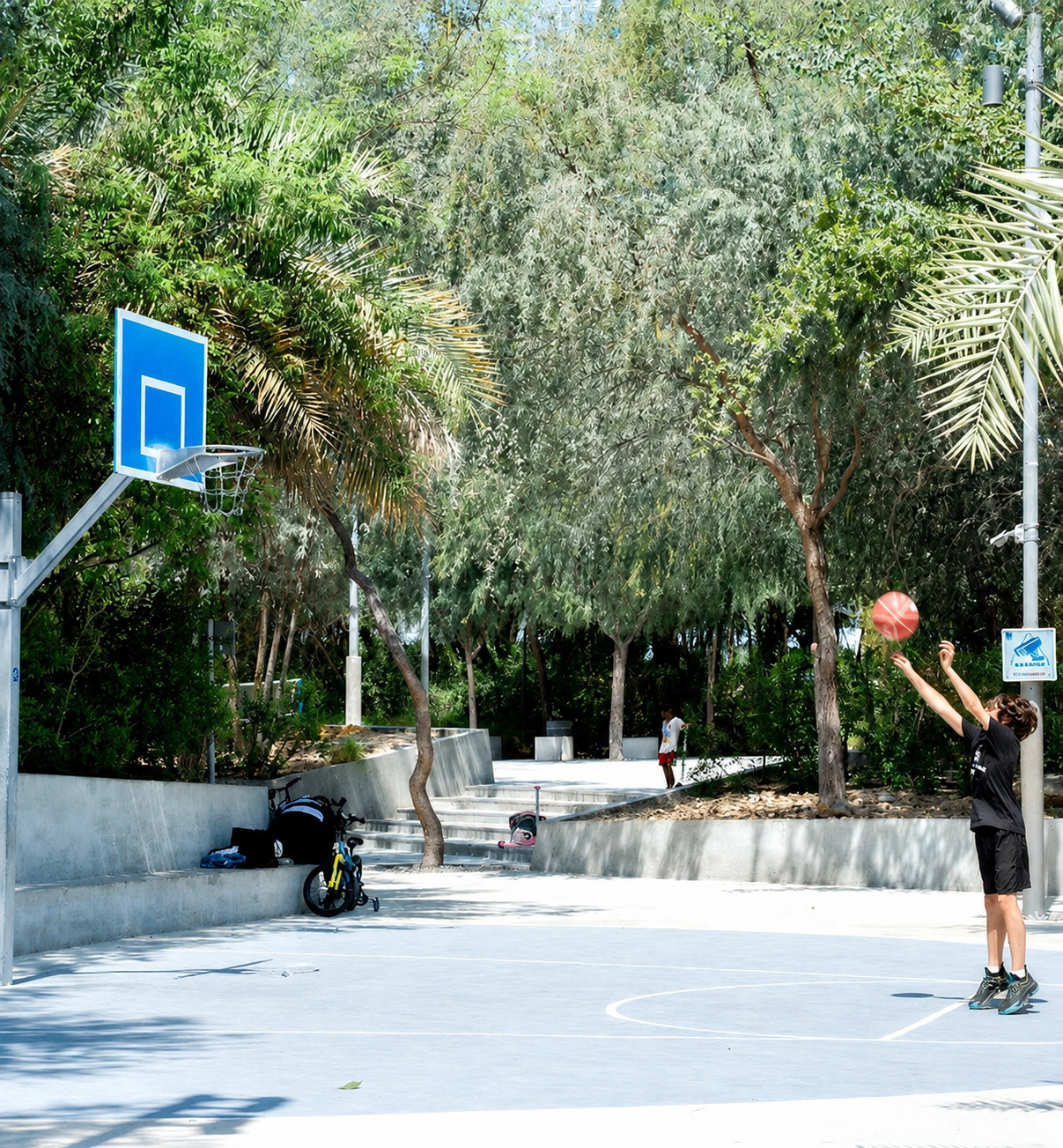
Al Fay Park

Al Fay Park on the island uses native plants and has sports facilities. Cove Beach Makers District is a licensed beach club on the waterfront. Aldar and Abu Dhabi Art have placed public artworks in Reem Central Park.

== See also ==
- List of islands of the United Arab Emirates
- Abu Dhabi
- Abu Dhabi Global Market
- Al Maryah Island
- Saadiyat Island
