= Repton School =

Public school in Repton, Derbyshire, England

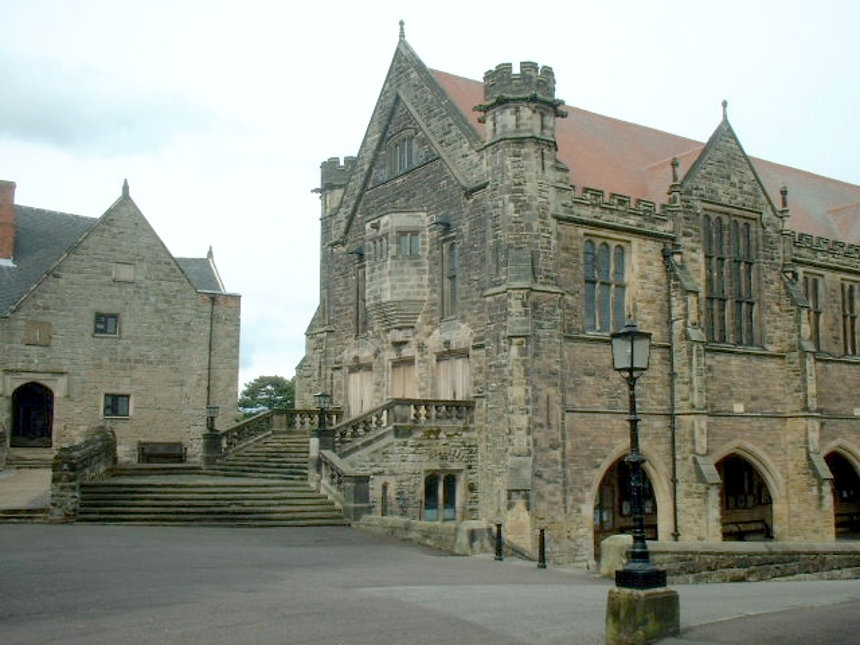

Location
- Willington Road; Repton, Derbyshire, DE65 6FH; England; 52.8409°N 1.5510°W

Information
- Type: Public school Private boarding and day school
- Motto: Latin: Porta Vacat Culpa (The gate is free from blame)
- Religious affiliation: Church of England
- Established: Bequest made: 1557; Land acquired: 1559; 467 years ago
- Founder: Sir John Port
- Local authority: Derbyshire County Council
- Department for Education URN: 113009 Tables
- Ofsted: Reports
- Headmaster: Mark Semmence
- Gender: Mixed
- Age range: 13–18
- Enrollment: 588 (2020)
- Capacity: 680
- Student to teacher ratio: 8:1
- Campus size: 75-acre (30 ha)
- Campus type: Semi-rural
- Houses: 10
- Colours: Navy, Maroon and yellow
- Budget: £21,482,088 (2024)
- Revenue: £21,121,865 (2024)
- Alumni: Old Reptonians
- Preparatory school: Repton Preparatory School
- Website: repton.org.uk

Repton School is a 13–18 co-educational, private, boarding and day school in the public school tradition, in Repton, Derbyshire, England.

Sir John Port of Etwall, on his death in 1557, left funds to create a grammar school which was then established at the Repton Priory. For its first 400 years, the school accepted only boys; girls were admitted from the 1970s, and the school was fully co-educational by the 1990s.

Notable alumni, also known as "Old Reptonians", include C. B. Fry, Claude Guillebaud, Harold Abrahams, Christopher Isherwood, Jeremy Clarkson, Andy Wilman, Christopher Frayling, Roald Dahl, Adrian Newey and Lord Ramsey of Canterbury.

== History ==
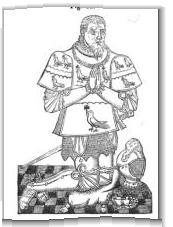
Brass of founder Sir John Port on his tomb in St Helen's parish church, Etwall, Derbyshire

The school was founded by a 1557 legacy in the will of Sir John Port of Etwall, leaving funds for a grammar school at Etwall or Repton, conditional on the students praying daily for the souls of his family:

"And I will that the Scollers of the said Scoole everye mornynge at their comynge to the said Scoole, and also at the after nowne at and upon their departinge from the Schole to pray for my parentes soules, my soule..." – The Will of Sir John Port, 6th June 1557

Through this private endowment, Repton School was set up as a charity, with early boarding pupils coming from Repton and the neighbouring villages.

The school was founded within the remains of Repton Priory, which were granted for the school in 1559 by Gilbert Thacker. The religious site had been founded in the 12th-century by the Augustinian order and had been in existence until it was dissolved in 1538 by Henry VIII. After dissolution, the Thacker family had lived at the priory until 1553. Gilbert Thacker destroyed the church, almost entirely in a day, during the time of Queen Mary fearing the priory would be recommissioned as part of the Counter-Reformation.

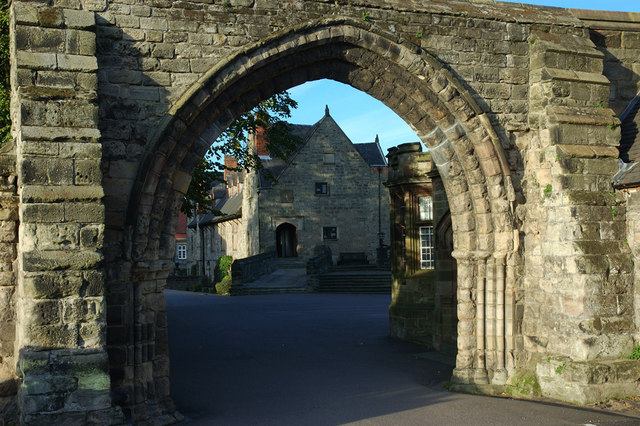
The School Arch, formerly part of Repton Priory, was moved to its current site in 1906.

Only parts of the original buildings remained when the school was established. These comprised: the footings of areas of the priory remain in some areas, uncovered during construction work in 1922; the bases of a cluster of columns of the former chancel and chapels; fragments of an arch belonging to the former pulpitum, moved to their current position in 1906; fragments of the door surrounds of both the chapter house and warming room. and largest surviving portion of the priory known as "Prior Overton's Tower", which is post-1437; largely altered, it has been incorporated into a 19th-century building.

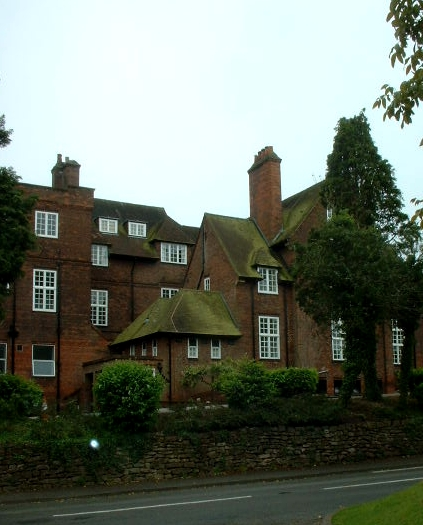
New House

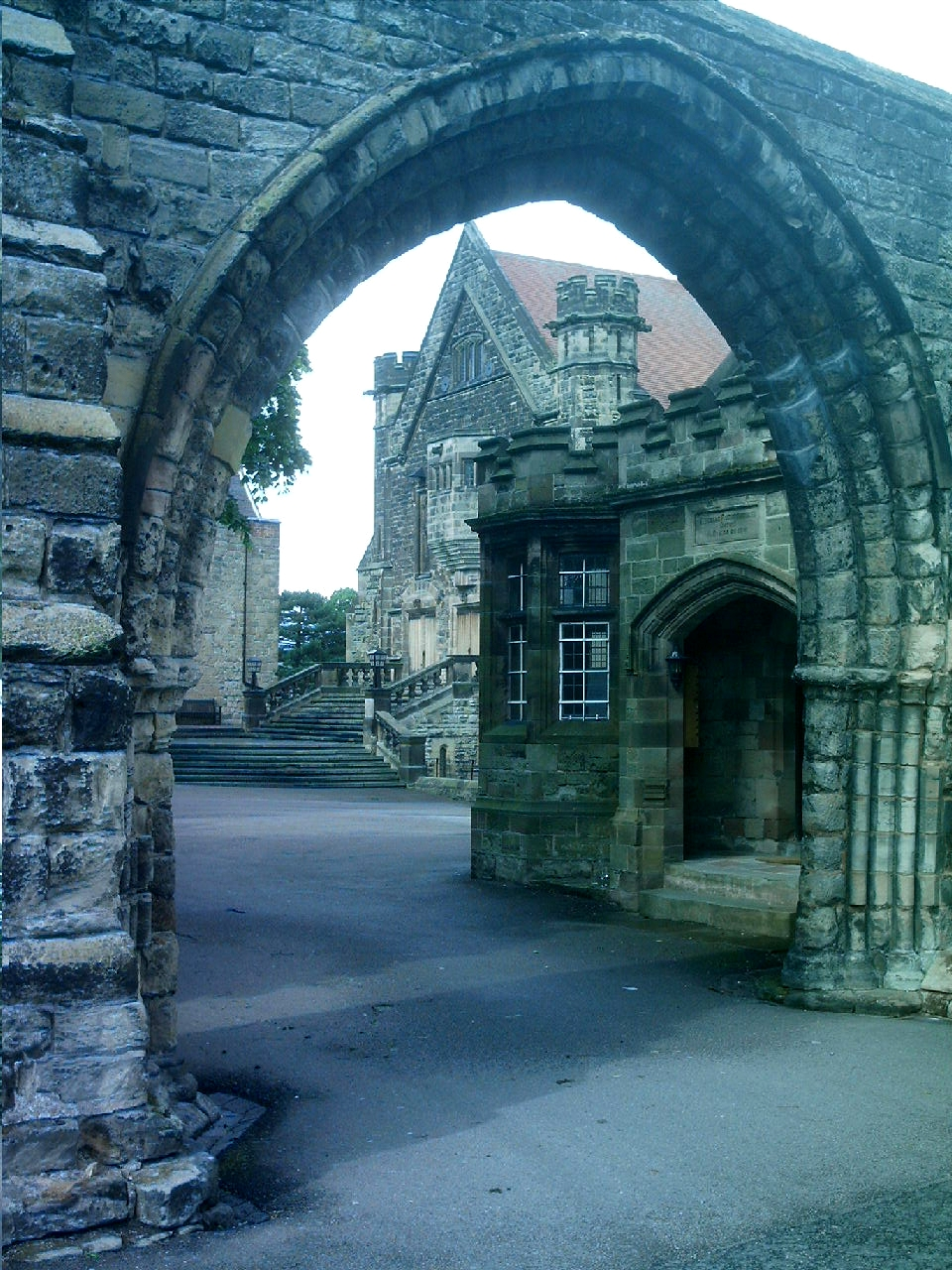
The Arch

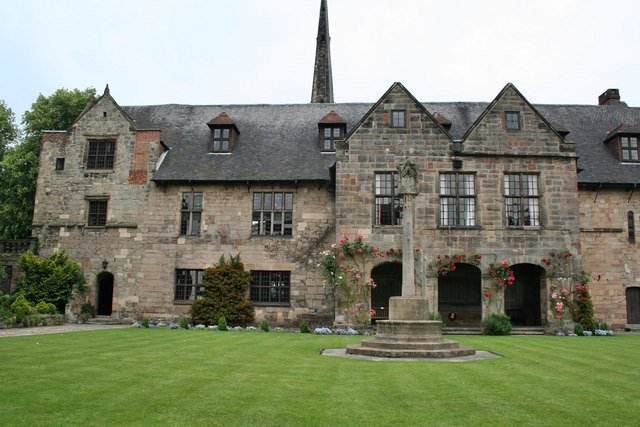
The Old Priory and Garth

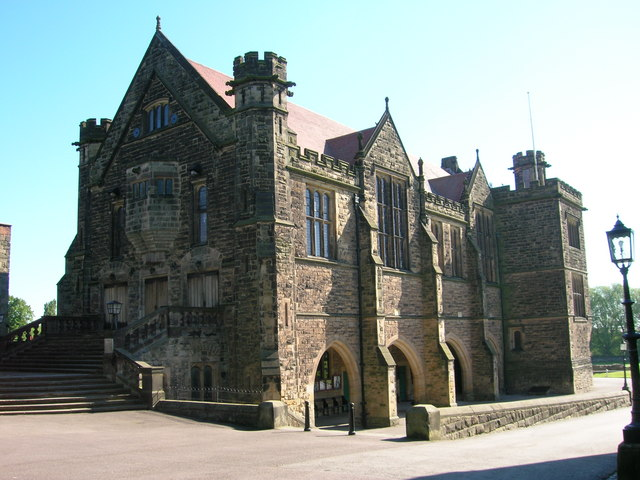
Pears School

However, following the bequeathment of the former religious buildings relations between the school and the Thacker family began to deteriorate due to a conflict of interest in accessibility. Almost eighty years later in 1642, the school commenced legal action against the Thacker family. In 1670, a wall was built to keep the two parties apart.

Within the first hundred years, student body numbers rose to 200, but they had fallen by 1681 to twenty-eight boys.

The social mix of the early school was very broad. Among the first twenty-two names on the register of Repton there are five gentlemen, four husbandmen, nine yeomen, two websters, or weavers, a carpenter and a tanner. During the 17th century, the school educated the sons of Earl of Chesterfield and Earl of Ardglass, Samuel Shaw and John Woodward, who was apprenticed as a linen draper before he took up medicine, eventually being appointed Gresham Professor of Physic.

=== 18th and 19th centuries ===
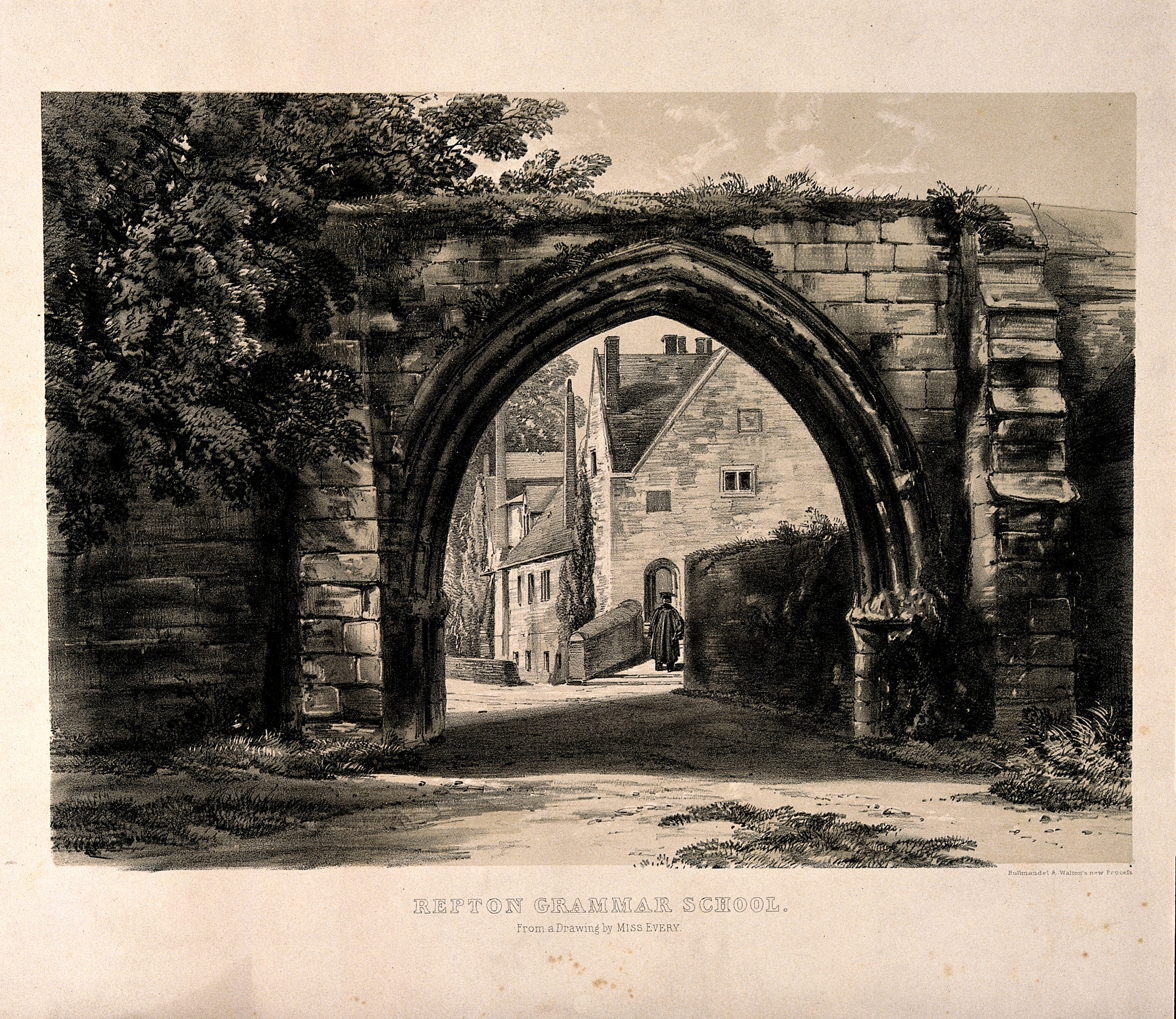
Repton Grammar School gateway: tinted lithograph by Hullmandel & Walton

In a letter from George Denman in the 1830s, there was a pupil-conferred role called "Cock of the School". A boy would be identified as the holder of this office after competing against likely candidates; once a boy was incumbent in this role, the younger boys deferred to him to do his work; writing in 1907, G. S. Messiter described the practice as an "ancient custom."

In 1858, a chapel was constructed on campus and later opened in 1859.

In 1865, a commission presided over by Henry Labouchere, 1st Baron Taunton investigated all endowed secondary schools in England, including Repton. The Schools Inquiry Commission published its findings in 1868. The research compiled helped aid the Endowed Schools Act 1869.

When public schools were attempting to reform, Repton's headmaster at the time lamented the shared tensions from all schools between local boys and boarders, stating that despite a sincere attempt to break down the barriers between them, he had had little success, and a substantial number of applications from "persons of good standing... and good fortune" had been withdrawn when told the boys were "of all classes down to the sons of blacksmiths and washerwomen". Due to this conflict, local village boys stopped attending Repton, which the headmaster at the time said was "mainly for the sake of the village boys... [to mitigate a] constant fear of their being ill-treated."

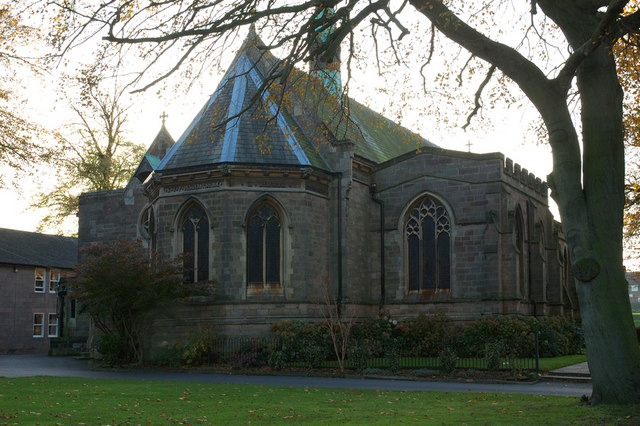
Repton School Chapel

The first Committee of the Headmasters' Conference, appointed in December 1870, included the headmaster of Repton.

=== 20th century ===
In 1907, a gymnasium was added, which is now grade II listed. In this decade, the chapel was enlarged, the Science Block, Armoury, Shooting Range and Swimming Bath were built, and the Priory 'Tithe' Barn turned into the Art School.

Geoffrey Fisher (later to become Archbishop of Canterbury) became headmaster in 1914. In the early 1900s, a reforming master, Victor Gollancz, established classes in political education for the boys. The classes were open to Upper School members and enlistment was voluntary. Gollancz and D. C. Somervell conducted the lessons on “topics of parliamentary reform, the position of women, the future of the Empire, trade unions, individualism and co-operation in industry, the organisation of peace and a League of Nations, conservatism, liberalism, modern Ireland, Alsace-Lorraine and the Russian Revolution.” Repton was considered one of the first schools to offer civics classes in its curriculum. However, certain staff members opposed these classes, considering them as being radical. When H. J. Snape was invited to address the Civics Class on conservatism, the tension between Gollancz and Snape's opposing beliefs led to a “flaming row between them.” As a result of the affair, the War Office considered withdrawing its recognition of Repton's school Corps. This led to Fisher dismissing Gollancz and retaining Snape; yet, Fisher blamed Snape's misconduct as “a very discreditable campaign of personal abuse and violent language…against Mr. Gollancz.”

1,912 former pupils of the school served in the First World War, of whom 355 died in service. A war memorial was unveiled on major general Sir John Burnett-Stuart, director of military operations and intelligence, and dedicated by Edwyn Hoskyns, Bishop of Southwell on 1 November 1922.

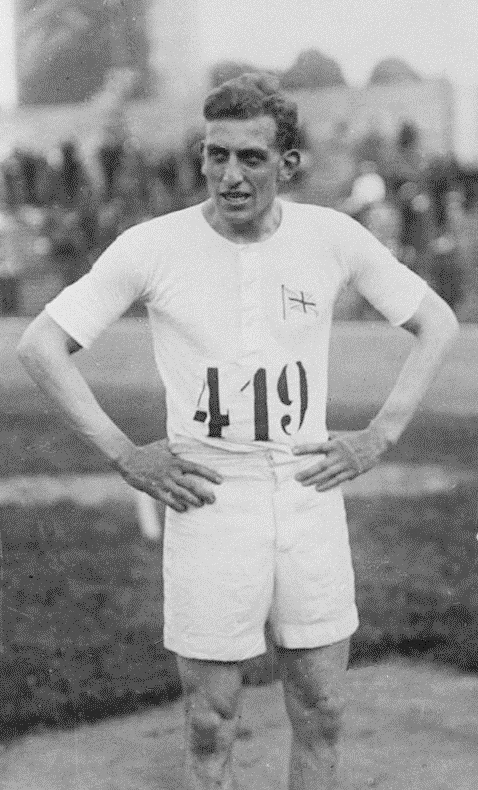
Harold Abrahams, pictured here at the 1924 Olympics, joined the school in 1914

Harold Abrahams, winner of the 100m sprint in the 1924 Paris Olympics, joined the school in 1914. Recalling his time at the school, Abrahams said he encountered antisemitism from other boys, often feeling bullied and alone.

In 1917, the writers Christopher Isherwood and Edward Upward began their time at Repton. They formed a friendship which continued when they both attended Corpus Christi College, Cambridge. Around the same time, Arnold Cooke, Bunny Austin and David Cochrane also attended Repton.

In September 1920, the poet Vernon Watkins was sent to Repton. His gentle character initially provoked bullying in his early years; yet, in a 1923 letter sent from Watkins to Eric Falk, he expressed his fondness for Repton as well as a school crush on poet Rupert Brooke: “I can’t think of anyone except Rupert Brooke.” Upward reflected that “everyone was homosexual, up to a point, at Repton.” While at the school, Watkins was granted the Howe Verse Prize, the Lancelot Sayes Prizes for French & German, and the Schreiber Prize for his writing. Upon his departure, Watkins stated: “Leaving Repton was what I had expected it to be; - a ghastly affair which left me in tears.” The school has claimed him as "perhaps the best poet Repton has had".

In 1924, George Gilbert Stocks, a director of music at the school, set the hymn Dear Lord and Father of Mankind to the tune Repton for use in the school's chapel. He took the melody from Hubert Parry's 1888 contralto aria "Long since in Egypt's plenteous land" in his oratorio Judith.

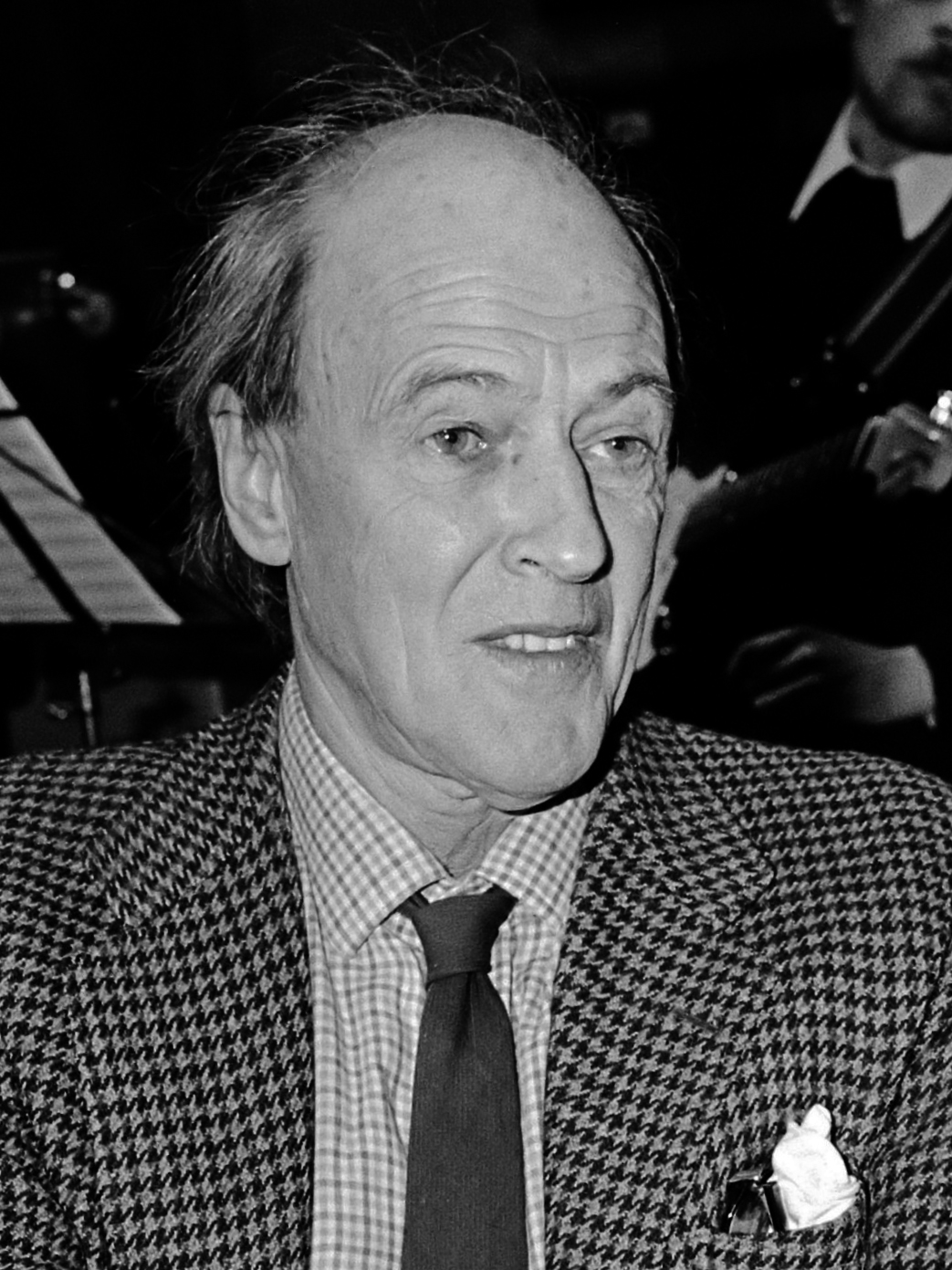
Roald Dahl gives accounts of his time at Repton in his autobiography

The writer Roald Dahl attended in the 1930s.He later stated that he "couldn't get over it" and has "never got over it." His semi-autobiographical Boy describes his negative experience with physical altercations between students, and the caning of a pupil by headmaster Fisher. (Note: "... he was ordered to take down his trousers and kneel on the headmaster's sofa with the top half of his body hanging over one end of the sofa. The great man then gave him one terrific crack. After that there was a pause. The cane was put down and the headmaster began filling his pipe from a tin of tobacco. He also started to lecture the kneeling boy about sin and wrongdoing. Soon, the cane was picked up again and a second tremendous crack was administered upon the trembling buttocks. Then the pipe-filling business and the lecture went on for maybe 30 seconds. Then came the third crack of the cane ... At the end of it all, a basin, a sponge and a small clean towel were produced by the headmaster, and the victim was told to wash away the blood before pulling up his trousers.") But Dahl's biographer, Jeremy Treglown, has pointed out he was mistaken: the caning was in May 1933, a year after Fisher had left Repton, and the headmaster concerned was John Christie, Fisher's successor. In his 1984 autobiography, Dahl states that when he was a young fag, he was instructed to warm toilet seats for older boys at the school. He was also, along with other boys at the school, used as a product tester for Cadbury chocolate bars. Dahl claims that this was the inspiration for his book, Charlie and the Chocolate Factory.

==== Second World War and after ====
The headmaster from 1937 to 1943 was H. G. Michael Clarke, who left the school to pursue an ecclesiastical career and became Provost of Birmingham Cathedral. He led the school during one of the most difficult periods of its history, when mounting debts and falling numbers, together with the effects of the war, led to questions as to the continuing viability of the institution; Clarke was obliged to close departments and two houses (The Cross and Latham). The school owed £50,000 (around £3.5 million at today's prices) and, in 1941, the Board of Education said its "future is doubtful".

In the Second World War, 188 former members of the school died serving in the armed forces. Airmen were billeted in Mitre House during the war. In 1948, a tablet extension was commissioned for the Derbyshire WWI Memorial in order to include WWII casualties. The extension was inaugurated in a ceremony led on 10 July 1949, unveiled by lieutenant general Sir Charles Gairdner and dedicated by former Geoffrey Fisher, by then Archbishop of Canterbury.

Numbers attending the school recovered in the late 1940s, such that The Cross was able to reopen in 1945 and Latham House in 1947. By 1957, the school was in better health: full with 470 pupils.

1957 saw the 400 year centenary of the school, celebrated with a royal visit from Queen Elizabeth II and Prince Philip, Duke of Edinburgh. A new chemistry block and workshops were added within the precinct, as well as extensive alterations to the science block. John Gammell took office as headmaster in 1968 and during his tenure girls began to be educated at Repton. It started with the arrival of two girls in 1970. By 1979, the first purpose-built girls' boarding house was opened.

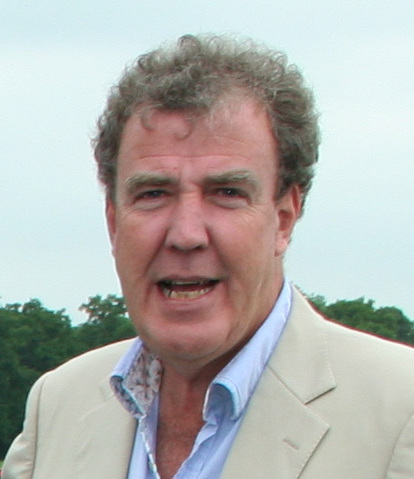
Jeremy Clarkson attended Repton in the 1970s.

Hazing is recorded as having taken place at Repton into the late 20th century. Jeremy Clarkson attended the school, later noting that he had suffered extreme hazing by other students, including being plunged into an ice pool and having his trousers cut in half. He was later expelled for "drinking, smoking and generally making a nuisance" of himself. He has stated that this conduct included doing car stunts on the sports pitches, smoking in the chapel, filling all the locks on the premises with Polyfilla, and attending lessons naked from the waist down.

Likewise, fagging continued in the 1980s when cricketer Chris Adams was at the school; he subsequently observed, "The ingrained hierarchy whereby the older boys would subject the younger pupils to a lot of misery through the system of fagging. It was basically a system of slavery and I hated seeing the young lads literally trembling with fear".

In the early 1980s, the old Sanatorium was converted into a Music School. Due to increasing numbers of female pupils in the 1990s, headmaster Graham Jones spearheaded the construction of girls' houses. Two boys boarding houses (Brook House and The Hall) were closed and their occupants were reconfigured into a single new house, School House.

=== 21st century ===
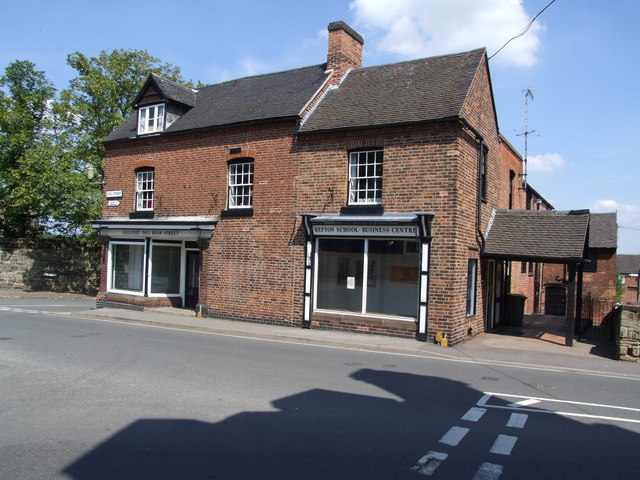
Repton School Business Centre and Gallery, in a former shop

The school marked its 450th anniversary in 2007 with a royal visit from Prince Edward, Earl of Wessex. Celebrations also included concerts featuring Michael Ball and Bryan Ferry.

In 2011, the 400 Hall theatre (originally built in 1957) was remodelled by Avery Associates Architects, following a £3.3 million upgrade. In 2013, a £9 million science block was built. During the preparations for the building work, archaeological digs were undertaken which indicated the site had been occupied in the Roman period. Around this time, the old Squash Courts were made into a new gallery and textiles studio for the Art department.

A new teaching block, the Lynam Thomas Building, in the precinct and a major refurbishment programme was being undertaken. In November 2019, Adam Peaty opened a newly redeveloped £6 million sports centre at the school. The sport centre building has since been nominated for Excellence in Design by the East Midlands Bricks Awards.

Alastair Land was headmaster from 2016 to 2019 and was succeeded as headmaster by Mark Semmence.

In September 2019, the school began using an AI service called AS Tracking in order to monitor students' mental health. The software was also used in 150 schools, assessing over 50,000 students' wellbeing. In November 2019, Libby Lane, Lord Bishop of Derby was appointed visitor of Repton School.

== Co-curricular ==
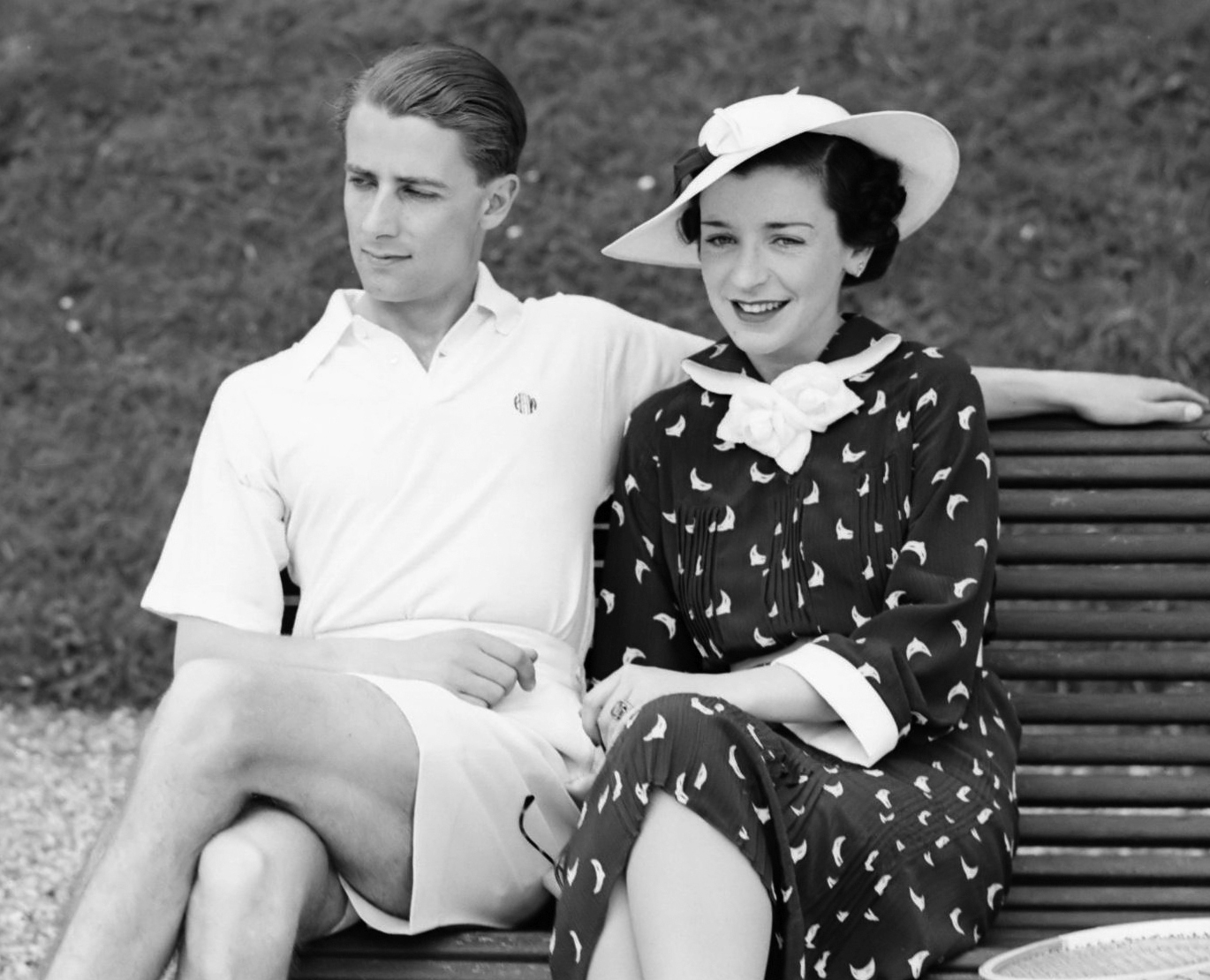
Bunny Austin attended Repton School.

The school has a Combined Cadet Force and a music school, as well as various after-school clubs. All pupils are enrolled in CCF for one year; involvement thereafter is voluntary. Pupils can also choose to participate in the Duke of Edinburgh Award.

=== Sports ===
The school competes in various sports. Main sports are: men's football, hockey and cricket; women's hockey, netball and tennis. Repton School has produced more than 150 first-class cricketers, 11 internationals, and three Test captains. Notable sporting former pupils include the 1932 Wimbledon tennis finalist, Bunny Austin, and several first-class cricketers. The Olympic gold medalist and world record holder Adam Peaty used Repton's swimming pool as a training facility. His coach, Melanie Marshall, taught swimming at the school.

In 2013, six former pupils played together in an international hockey match.

In October 2018, Repton announced a complete £6 million renovation of the school's sporting facilities, including a new sports hall and a new strength and conditioning gymnasium. Repton's football team also won The 2018 ISFA Barry Burns Northern Eights Competition.

In January 2019, Repton announced Chris Read, former England cricketer, as the school's director of cricket. In 2019, the first all-girls Lord's Taverners "Wicketz Festival", three days of celebration, education and cricket was held at the school. The U18 girls (outdoor), U16 girls (outdoor and indoor), U16 boys (outdoor) and U14 girls (outdoor) won national titles that same year.

In February 2020, Repton announced Scott Talbot, former Olympian and coach for the New Zealand and Australian national swim squads, as the school's director of swimming.

=== Fine arts ===
Repton opened their 400 Hall theatre in 1957. In 2011, the theatre reopened after a £3.3 million renovation. A studio theatre was added in 2003 and the complex extended and fully refurbished in 2011 by architect Bryan Avery.

The school has been hosting a literary festival in October for some years. There is an annual Plowright lecture, with the 2020 lecture being on serial killers. One of the students won Ayn Rand Essay Competition prizes in consecutive years. In 2022, this event was branded "a flop", with organisers stating "audience for many of the speakers were woefully small...Everywhere was completely thin. It was such a shame".

The school's theatre was used for various performances during a time of closure of a theatre space in the Derby Guildhall, operated by the local authority in Derby.

== Houses and pastoral arrangements ==
Repton School offers traditional boarding only, with no flexi or weekly options available. Approximately 70 per cent of pupils are boarders.

The school also has an on-site tuck shop called 'The Grubber'.

== Fees and inspection ==
In 2019/2020, fees were £36,783 for boarders and £27,207 for day pupils per year.

There are scholarships available for drama, sport, art, music, academic capacity and "all-rounder talent"; these do not exceed 20% of the school's fees. There is also some bursary assistance.

The school is inspected by the Independent Schools Inspectorate. An integrated inspection took place in March 2014, finding the school to be "exceptionally successful in achieving its aims... the quality of the pupils' achievements is excellent".

An emergency inspection in January 2015 was ordered by the Department for Education reviewing welfare and safeguarding compliance under the Independent School Standard Regulations (ISSRs) and the National Minimum Standards for Boarding (NMSB). The school failed to meet a number of the regulations, namely those dealing with pupil safeguarding; the promotion of good behaviour; suitability of staff and governance, leadership and management of the school.

A regulatory compliance inspection took place in 2018 which found that the school met all of the minimums and associated requirements. The subsequent integrated regulatory compliance and educational quality inspection in 2020 found that Repton met all regulatory compliance standards and was awarded the highest rating in each area.

== Affiliate schools ==
The school set up Repton International Schools Ltd (RISL) in 2013 to establish, develop and maintain British international schools. The overseas schools are owned and funded by local investors, which can be education businesses, real estate corporates, private equity firms or wealthy philanthropists. They are licensed to use the Repton School "brand" and enter into a services agreement with RISL, which provides a full range of educational services and academic oversight. RISL remits its profits to Repton School Trust in the UK, which helps fund capital projects and bursaries. Repton has partnerships with John Port Spencer Academy, Etwall, and Repton Primary School.

The portfolio of overseas schools comprises:

- Repton School Dubai (opened in September 2007), situated on a site in Nad al Sheba
- Repton School Abu Dhabi, which has two campuses on Al Reem Island, Abu Dhabi (2013 and 2017)
- Foremarke Dubai (2013), located in Al Barsha South and recently re-branded as Repton Al Barsha
- Repton International School (Malaysia) (2020)
- Chiway-Repton School, located in Xiamen, Fujian Province, PRC (2020)
- Repton Cairo opened in September 2020 as part of the Mivida development in New Cairo
- Repton Doha will open in 2021, with Repton New Giza and Repton Sofia to follow in 2023

=== Preparatory school ===
Repton has a junior school, named Repton Prep, which was founded in 1940.

In early 2020, it was announced that Repton School would be merging with Foremarke Hall School from September 2020 into a single school called Repton Prep. Shortly after, St Wystan's School joined the Repton group of schools.

== Culture and cultural references ==
Alexander Wilson, novelist and spy, lied about being an alumnus of Repton School, as did Fred Perry, whose lie gained him entry to a tennis tournament that barred players who had not attended public school.

The "Stig" character in Top Gear is said to have been named after the school's pejorative slang term for new boys, a private reference with the producer Andy Wilman, who attended Repton with Clarkson.

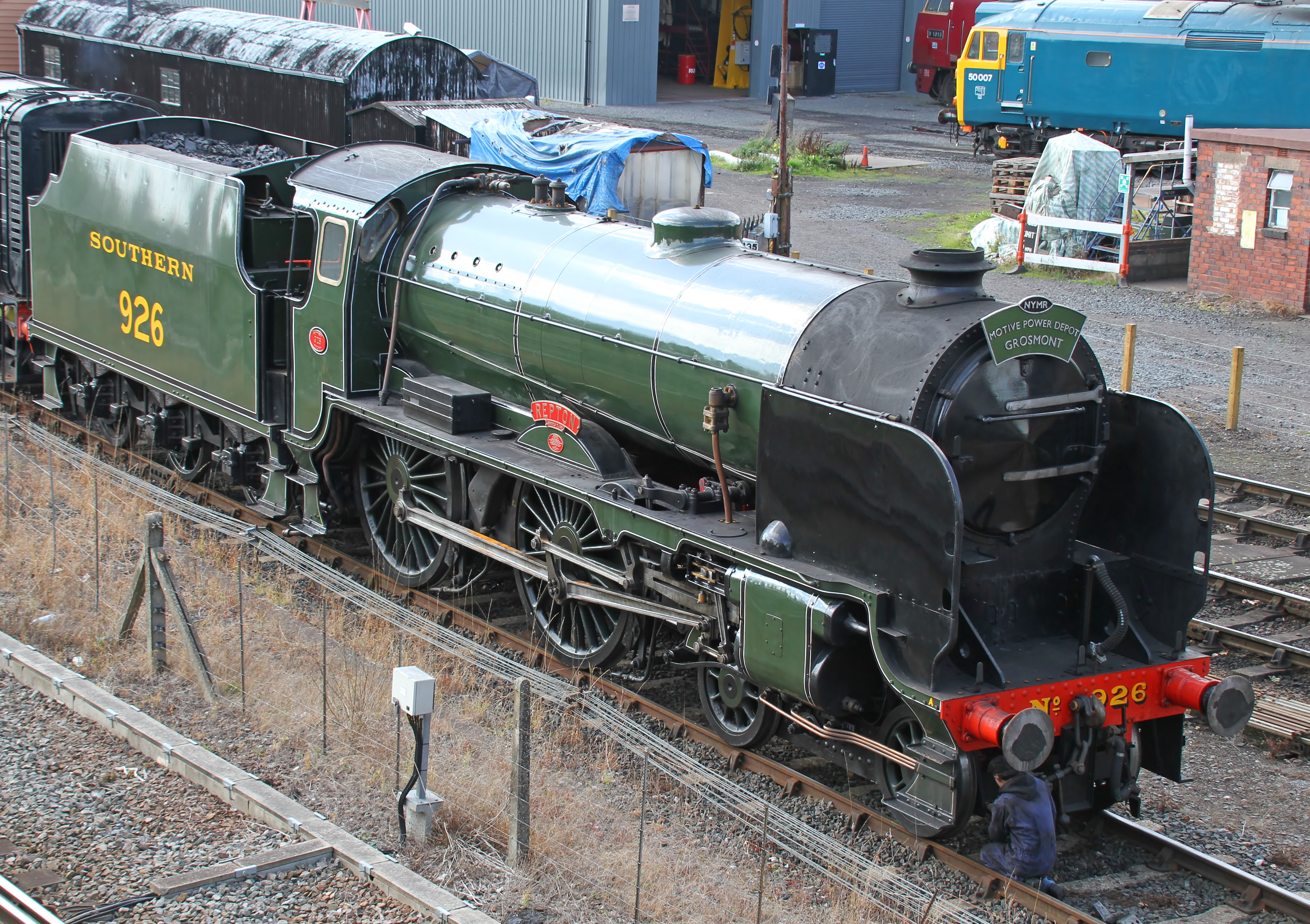
1930s steam locomotive named after the school

There is also a steam locomotive called "Repton" named after the school in 1934: Southern Railway, Class V, Schools No 926, today based at the North Yorkshire Moors Railway.

The school's motto, Porta Vacat Culpa ("the gate is free from blame"), is a quotation from Ovid's Fasti. "The gate" (Porta) refers to the school's arch and, by a synecdoche of pars pro toto, the school itself, whilst also being a pun on the name of the school's founder, Sir John Port.

The school has twice, in the 1930s and 1980s respectively, represented the fictional Brookfield School in a 1939 film and a 1984 BBC version of Goodbye, Mr. Chips. One of the screenwriters of the 1939 film, Eric Maschwitz, attended Repton. Around 200 pupils were extras in the 1939 film. Similarly, pupils appeared as extras in the 1984 BBC version.

=== Royal visits ===
The school has had the following royal visits:

- The Queen and Prince Philip made an official visit to the school on 28 March 1957, to mark the 400 year anniversary of the school's establishment. The welcome was led by former headmaster Geoffrey Fisher and the Queen planted a mulberry tree.
- The Duchess of Kent visited the school in June 1985.
- The school received a visit from The Duke of Kent in September 2013.
- The school marked its 450th anniversary in 2007 with a visit from Prince Edward.

== Headmasters ==
- Thomas Whitehead (1621–1639)
- Philip Ward (1639–1642)
- William Ullock (1642–1667)
- Joseph Sedgwicke (1667–1672)
- Edward Letherland (1672–1681)
- John Doughty (1681–1705)
- Edward Abbot (1705–1714)
- Thomas Gawton (1714–1723)
- William Dudson (1723–1724)
- George Fletcher (1724–1741)
- William Asteley (1741–1767)
- William Prior (1767–1779)
- William Bagshaw Stevens (1779–1800)
- William Boultbee Sleath (1800–1830)
- John Heyrick Macaulay (1830–1840)
- Thomas Williamson Peile (1841–1854)
- Steuart Adolphus Pears (1854–1874)
- Henry Robert Huckin (1874–1882)
- William Furneaux (1883–1900)
- Hubert Burge (1900–1901)
- Lionel Ford (1901–1910)|
- William Temple (1910–1914)
- Geoffrey Fisher (1914–1932)
- John Christie (1932–1937)
- H.G. Michael Clarke (1937–1943)
- Theodore Lynam Thomas (1944–1961)
- John Thorn (1961–1968)
- John Gammell (1968–1978)
- David Jewell (1979–1987)
- Graham E. Jones (1987–2003)
- Robert Holroyd (2003–2014)
- Sarah Tennant, (acting head, 2014–2016)
- Alastair Land (2016–2019)
- Mark Semmence (from March 2019)

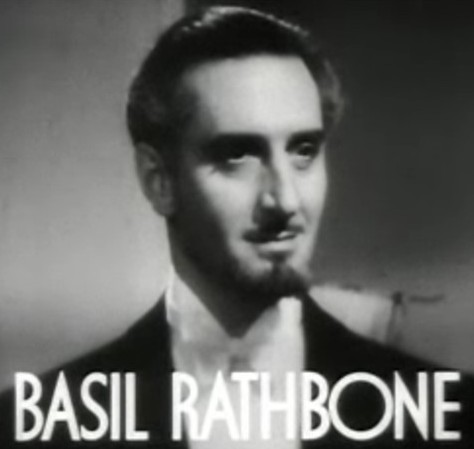
Basil Rathbone, an alumnus of the school

== Controversies ==
=== Fee fixing and gender pay gap ===
In September 2005, the school was one of fifty schools operating independent school fee-fixing, in breach of the Competition Act, 1998. All of the schools involved were ordered to abandon this practice, pay a nominal penalty of £10,000 each and to make ex-gratia payments totalling three million pounds into a trust designed to benefit pupils who attended the schools during the period in respect of which fee information had been shared. The Bursar at the time was Carl Bilson.

Female staff members were paid 56–57% less than their male coworkers at the school in 2018, and 50% less in 2019.

=== Incidents ===
In 2014, Southern Derbyshire Magistrates' Court fined the school £10,000 following a guilty plea to a health and safety charge after an incident of negligence. In April 2019, a teacher tested positive for drink-driving after police saw his vehicle mount a kerb and then enter the school grounds. He was subsequently convicted and banned from driving for 20 months. Two months later a chemical spillage at the school's sports centre resulted in nine individuals needing precautionary treatment, as a result of a chlorine leak.

In the summer of 2023, a 14-year-old girl died on the school campus at an event organised by Christians in Sport, a third-party religious group.

=== Sexual abuse ===
The Charity Commission expressed "serious concerns" about safeguarding in 2018 after it received a sequence of serious incident reports from Repton School early in that year, specifically:

- In December 2014, a former head of physics, John Mitchell, was found to have abused a position of trust contrary to s.16(1)(a) of the Sexual Offences Act 2003 when he engaged in sexual activity with a female between the age of 13 and 17, not believing that she was 18 or over. He also communicated in a sexual way and with sexual motivations to this same pupil. He was disqualified from teaching indefinitely by the National College for Teaching and Leadership, following a finding that this was unacceptable professional conduct.
- In October 2017, a former pupil began proceedings against the school, claiming negligence on the school's part, in connection with an alleged rape of that pupil by another pupil in 2014. A 17-year-old pupil was arrested on suspicion of carrying out two rapes at the school; it was claimed that the school failed to supervise or discipline its pupil. The claimant made a request of the Derbyshire Constabulary for the papers from its investigation, which the police refused to provide without a court order.
- In 2018, four members of the school's staff were subject to police investigation for inappropriate sexual conduct towards children. In August 2018, one of these individuals, Jeremy Woodside, a 28-year-old former organist at the school, was placed on the Sex Offender's Register. The chronology of those issues emerging in early 2018 was as follows:
  - On 29 January 2018, police arrested a member of staff on suspicion of attempting sexual contact with a child
  - On 14 March 2018, a second police investigation into a staff member, relating to safeguarding concerns, was launched
  - On 26 March 2018, allegations against a further two members of staff were reported
- In February 2022, a former teacher at the school, Simon Clague, pleaded guilty to multiple indictments for indecent assault and gross indecency with three pupils. All of the victims were under 16 at the time of the offending, which took place at the school in the 1990s; his trial was repeatedly delayed because of COVID-19. He was later, in July 2023, banned from teaching. In September 2023, three former pupils of the school sued following the criminal conviction of Clague. Victim Impact statements in this civil action highlighted 'irreversable damage' caused by his crimes, referring to 'stolen innocence'; one victim said they were manipulated into having a sexual relationship with Clague – and that the school 'knew and brushed it under the carpet'.

=== Resignation of three governors over safeguarding ===
In September 2022, 3 governors resigned en bloc over safeguarding issues at the school; these were additional safeguarding issues to those set out above that came to light after the jailing of Simon Clague.

Criminal barrister of the Queen's Counsel Tim Hannam, Parliamentary Commissioner for Standards Kathryn Stone, and former Chief Constable of Nottinghamshire Susannah Fish were identified in press reports as the three governors who quit their roles. Fish's resignation letter to the chairman of the governors, Mark Shires, said the decision to allow the teacher to remain in post means the school had not taken seriously:

"an appalling catalogue [of alleged past misconduct and it was therefore the case that].... safeguarding of pupils past, present and future is now in jeopardy and lacks credibility’.

== Notable alumni ==
Alumni of Repton School are known as Old Reptonians.

They include:

- Harold Abrahams, Olympic gold medallist (100m, Paris 1924)
- Bunny Austin, tennis player and Wimbledon finalist in 1932
- Michael Des Barres, actor and musician
- Nicholas Barrington, British diplomat and author.
- Theodore Bent, English explorer, archaeologist, and author.
- Jeremy Clarkson, journalist and presenter
- Sir Harcourt Clare, solicitor and former Clerk to Liverpool Corporation and Lancashire County Council
- Andy Wilman, television producer
- Brian Cook, later Sir Brian Batsford, graphic artist
- Roald Dahl, writer and children's author
- Blair Dunlop, musician
- James Fenton, poet and journalist
- Henry Justice Ford, illustrator
- Sir Christopher Frayling, former Rector of the Royal College of Art
- C. B. Fry, sportsman and writer
- Graeme Garden, writer and performer
- Claude Guillebaud, influential economist at the University of Cambridge
- Sir Francis Habgood, Chief Constable of Thames Valley Police 2015–2019
- David Hodgkiss, cricket administrator
- Will Hughes and Laurence Wyke, footballers
- Richard Hutton, Donald Carr and Chris Adams, cricketers
- Christopher Isherwood, writer and activist
- Andrew Li, former Chief Justice of Hong Kong
- Ewen MacIntosh, comedic actor best known for playing Keith Bishop ('Big Keith') in The Office
- Shona McCallin, hockey player and Olympic gold medallist
- Adrian Newey, Formula One technical director
- The Baron Ramsey of Canterbury, Archbishop of Canterbury 1961–1974
- Basil Rathbone, Nicholas Burns, George Rainsford and Tom Chambers, actors
- Georgie Twigg, hockey player and Olympic gold medallist
- Edward Upward, surrealist novelist
- Denton Welch (1915–1948), artist and novelist who ran away from Repton

== Notable former masters ==
A number of headmasters of Repton went on to senior Church of England positions in the 20th century.

- William Furneaux was headmaster from 1882 to 1900, and, after retiring from Repton, became Dean of Winchester.
- Lionel Ford was headmaster from 1901 to 1910, and went on to be Dean of York.
- Hubert Burge was headmaster between 1900 and 1901, after leaving the school he would become Bishop of Oxford.
- William Temple was headmaster for four years from 1910 to 1914, and went on to become Archbishop of Canterbury in 1942.
- Geoffrey Fisher, headmaster, later Archbishop of Canterbury 1945–1961:
- Harry Vassall played international rugby for England, and was master of Repton School in 1925.

== Notable other staff ==
- Dora Edith Morris (1871-1957), was Matron of the School Sanitorium from 1902 until at least 1911. She trained at The London Hospital under Eva Luckes between 1896-1898.

== Coat of arms and flag ==
The school's arms are three eaglets holding a cross.

== Partnerships ==
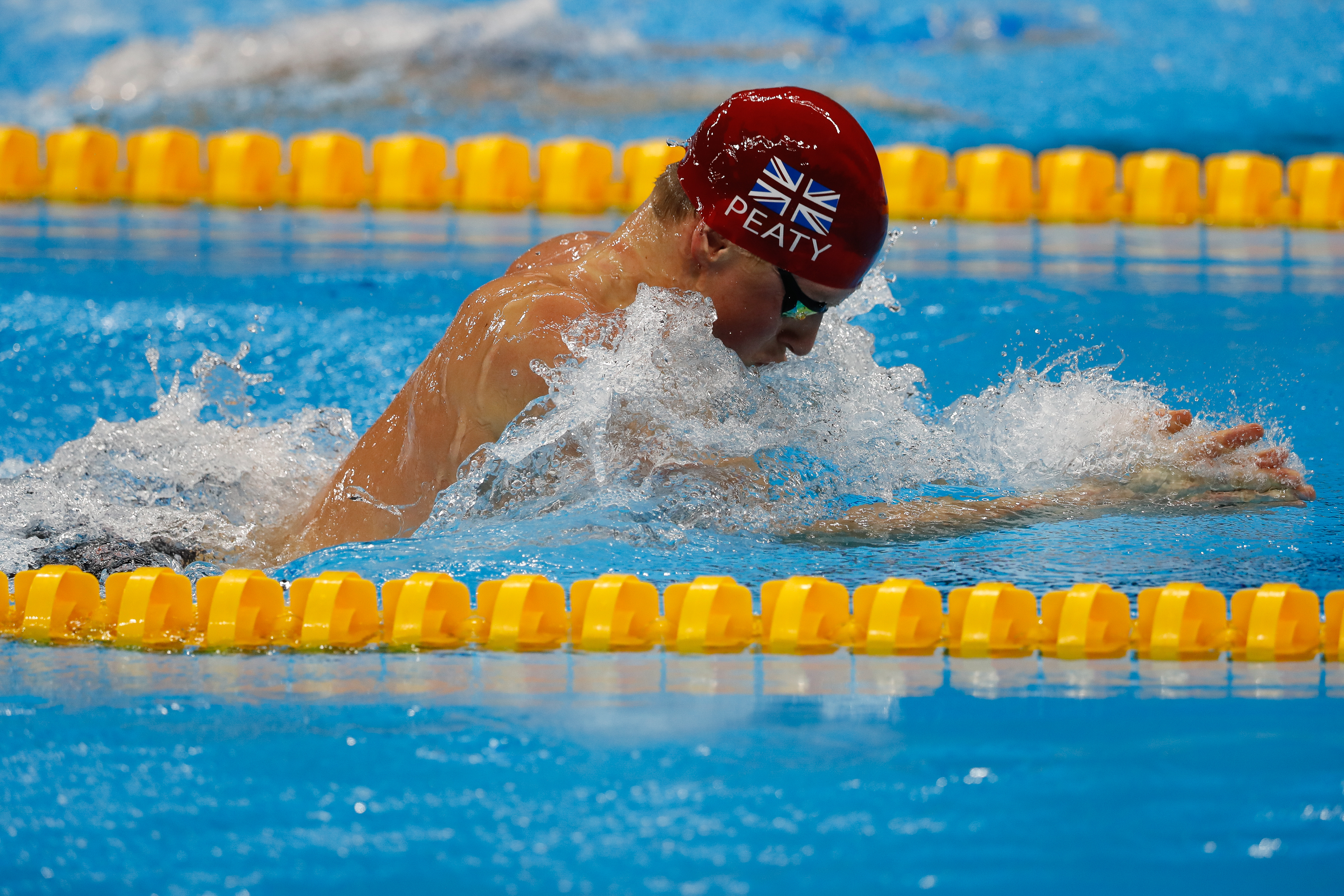
Adam Peaty attended Repton School after his talent was identified

In May 2016, the school made defibrillators on its site available to the local community. Some of the staff at the school have been vocal about the issue of speeding traffic in the village of Repton and have participated in public speed gun enforcement.

During the 2020 Coronavirus pandemic the school's DT department made PPE for key NHS workers.

Repton School and Repton village combine every year for a charity event known as Sale of Work. Funds raised are distributed to a range of local and national charities chosen by representatives of both communities.

== See also ==
- Listed buildings in Repton
