= Electrical contractor =

Specialized construction professional

An electrical contractor is a business person or firm that performs specialized construction work related to the design, installation, and maintenance of electrical systems. An electrical contractor is different from an electrician; an electrician is an individual tradesman and an electrical contractor is a business person or company that employs electricians. Both usually hold licenses and insurances to properly and safely operate a business, protecting the employees and home owners/business owners from insurance liabilities. These requirements vary from state to state. Electricians may work for an electrical contractor, or directly for individuals or companies.

== Industry classifications ==
Electrical contractors are generally classified by three major types of work performed.

- "Outside" or "line" contractors are responsible for high-voltage power transmission and distribution lines. Line contractors build and maintain the infrastructure required to transport electricity generated at a power plant through a series of high-voltage lines and substations before it is used to power facilities, buildings, and homes.
- "Inside" electrical contractors provide electricity to any structure within a property's boundary lines, including outdoor lighting or substations. Under current construction specification guidelines, "inside" electrical contractors can serve as prime contractors for all electrical and cabling design, installation, and maintenance for commercial, institutional, and residential buildings. Projects also include Database Centers/Infrastructure and Pharmaceutical Work.
- "Integrated building systems" (IBS) or "Voice/Data/Video" (VDV) electrical contractors work primarily with low-voltage installations such as back-up power, climate controls, wireless networks, energy-efficient lighting, telecommunications, fiber optics, and security systems. IBS contractors are particularly skilled at integrating these system controls to work together for maximum energy efficiency and building performance.

== Industry jobs ==
Electrical contractors employ workers in many capacities, determined by their level of training and experience. Some common jobs include:

- Apprentice electrician — Receives on-the-job training and classroom instruction from licensed journeymen or master electricians about how to install, modify, repair, and maintain power and lighting systems. Most apprentice programs last 3 to 5 years and apprentices earn wages during this training period.
- Journeyman electrician — Installs, modifies, repairs, and maintains power and lighting systems. Reads blueprints, terminates cable, and installs and troubleshoots control wiring from drawings. Has completed the apprentice program and holds a journeyman's license (according to state requirements) and supervises apprentices.
- Estimator — Calculates a project's duration and cost, including materials, overhead, and labor. This estimate is often submitted as a bid on a project and serves as a scheduling and budget guideline as the project proceeds.
- Project supervisor — Oversees workforce to encourage safe and high-quality installations. Monitors progress to meet project deadlines. Submits required reports and forms.

== Trade associations ==
=== United Kingdom ===
In the United Kingdom, the two main trade associations are the Electrical Contractors' Association, covering England, Northern Ireland and Wales, and SELECT - the Electrical Contractors' Association for Scotland. The main certification bodies are the National Inspection Council for Electrical Installation Contracting and Elecsa.

=== United States ===
The National Electrical Contractors Association (NECA) is the largest trade association in the electrical contracting industry, with about 4500 members. NECA publishes an industry magazine, and sponsors an annual convention and trade show. Independent Electrical Contractors (IEC) is another trade association for electrical contractors with 70 chapters across the U.S. They provide education and training via a U.S. Department of Labor recognized apprenticeship program.

The International Brotherhood of Electrical Workers organizes and represents over 700,000 members, and provides training and apprenticeship programs.

== Safety ==
Electrical contractors in the United States are required to follow National Electrical Code (NEC) to ensure systems work in a safe manner. The NEC is a widely adopted model code for the installation of electrical components and systems, designed to safeguard persons and property from hazards arising from the use of electricity. While these are the default minimum requirements and guidelines, some states modify selected areas of the NEC code to suit their specific circumstances.
