= High-speed rail in Egypt =

- القطار الكهربائي السريع (مصر)

- Planned high speed rail lines, May 2022. 1st segment is under construction with completion date of 2027. 2nd segment has been extended to the Western Desert and has begun construction, with no announced end date. Construction of the 3rd segment, which is currently in the planning stage, is reported to begin soon. Further lines are proposed.

- Ain Sokhna Train Station

Overview
- Headquarters: Cairo
- Founders: National Authority for Tunnels
- Locale: Egypt
- Dates of operation: 2027–

Technical
- Track gauge: 1,435mm Standard gauge
- Track length: 2000 km

Egypt has no operational high-speed rail links, but a project was launched in 2018 to construct three such lines with a total length of about 2,000 kilometres (1,200 mi). The first line links the cities of Ain Sokhna and Marsa Matrouh, the second connects the cities of Sixth of October and Abu Simbel, and the third connects the city of Qena with the cities of Hurghada and Safaga. There has also been a proposed 4th line connecting Port Said to Alexandria.

The first line is very near to being finished, as the Ain Sokhna to Sixth of October segment is expected to be finished around the first quarter of 2027, and the whole line to be open around mid-to-late 2027. The second line’s first segment will also open around the first quarter of 2027, connecting Sixth of October to Faiyum.

It is expected for the high speed rail system’s three lines to be finished around 2029, probably starting a huge economic boom, especially for Upper Egypt.

The project is being established by a coalition of German Siemens companies, the Arab Contractors and Orascom Construction, where Siemens will carry out all the works of the project's electrical, mechanical, and control systems, as well as the manufacture and supply of electric trains, the establishment of a maintenance workshop and the installation of its equipment, while the Arab Contractors and Orascom companies implement earth bridges, bridges, and industrial works for track, passenger terminals and fences. Once completed, the railway system will be operated and maintained by Deutsche Bahn and the Egyptian Elsewedy Electric.

== History ==
On 12 March 2018, Egypt's Transport Minister Hisham Arafat said that Egypt is in the process of launching a new high-speed railway linking the Mediterranean (Most likely referring to the northern coastal governorates like Alexandria, Beheira) and the Red Sea with the participation of more than 10 international companies.

In January 2021, Egypt's authorities signed a declaration of intent with a consortium led by Germany's Siemens company, with the first contract of 4.5 billion Euro for 660 km of the high-speed railway issued in September 2021. In May 2022, the contract was extended to encompass the complete 2000 km track with a budget totaling 8.1 billion Euros (US$8.7 billion).

In November 2022, DB International Operations, a subsidiary of Deutsche Bahn, and the Egyptian Elsewedy Electric won the contract to operate and maintain Egypt's high-speed rail network after completion.

== Train lines ==
=== Green line ===
The first 660 km was planned to begin at Mersa Matruh on the Mediterranean Sea, pass through Al-Alamein, Borg El Arab, then to Wadi El Natroun, on to the 6th October City, through southern Cairo to the New Administrative Capital, and end in Ain Sokhna on the Gulf of Suez of the Red Sea. As of January 2021, surveying and route planning have been completed and construction is underway to build bridges and track. This initial segment is intended to be used for both passengers and freight, and is projected to cost US$3 billion with a completion date of 2023. On 14 January 2021, a Memorandum of understanding was signed between Siemens Mobility and the National Authority of Tunnels, an authority under the Ministry of Transportation of Egypt to design, install, and maintain Egypt's first high-speed rail system. The initially dubbed "second line" between Alexandria and Borg El Arab was combined into this contract, and both are under construction as of 2022. The Siemens-led consortium was awarded a $4.5 billion contract to build the lines from Ain Sokhna to Marsa Matruh and to Alexandria in September 2021, and is scheduled for completion in 2027. The line will be outfitted with Velaro high-speed passenger trains. This 660 km segment will be designed to carry up to 30 million passengers annually, cut travel times in half, and cut carbon emissions by 70%. Design speed of the new railway line is going to be 250 km/h, while high-speed trains are going to reach 230 km/h during normal service.

=== Blue line ===
A second line will stretch from Sixth of October City through Fayoum, Minya, Aswan, and Abu Simbel over 1,100 km on the west bank of the Nile. Local stations will include Al-Ayat, Al-Fashn, Al-Adwa, Bani Mazar, Samalout, Abu Qurqas, Mallawi, and Dayrout. Survey and construction work for this line began in March 2022 by Egyptian authorities, especially around 6 October City and Fayoum, with an anticipated design speed of 250 km/h, but preliminary operation of express trains at 230 km/h. An extension of this line was announced in May 2022 from Aswan through Abu Simbel to Toshka and Sharq El Owainat in the Western Desert, as well as an extension to Wadi Halfa, in Sudan. The Kuwait Fund for Arab Economic Development signed a $2.45 million feasibility study for a 283.5 km line from Aswan to Toshka and Abu Simbel, as well as the 80 km extension to Sudan, which includes a 6 km bridge across Lake Nasser.

=== Red line ===
The third line is planned in the south from Safaga through Sahl Hasheesh, Hurghada, East Sohag, Qena, and Qus, ending in Luxor, at a total cost of $2.7 billion with a construction time of two years. Contracts for building the second and third lines were planned to be signed by Siemens in March 2022; the 8.1 billion euro contract was signed on May 31, 2022, between the Egyptian government and Siemens (and its consortium partners Orascom Construction and The Arab Contractors), and includes the construction of the second and third line as well as 41 Velaro 8-car high-speed passenger trains, 94 Desiro high-capacity four-car regional train sets, and 41 Vectron freight locomotives, as well as ETCS Level 2 and a suitable power grid.

The entire network is projected to cost US$23 billion and span over 2000 km.

== Rolling Stock ==
Class	Image	Type	Top speed		Number	Remarks	Built
Class	Image	Type	mph	km/h	Number	Remarks	Built
Siemens Velaro EGY		EMU	143	230	41 sets (328 cars)		
Siemens Desiro HC		EMU	100	160	94 sets (376 cars)		
Siemens Vectron		Electric locomotive	75	120	41		

== Future projects ==
Intent to build an extension westwards from Marsa Matruh through El Negaila to Sallum on the Libyan border, to Benghazi in Libya, was announced by Egyptian Transport Minister Kamel Al-Wazir in November 2020, and was again confirmed by the Libyan-Egyptian Chamber of Commerce on 18 January 2021. An extension to Siwa was also mentioned. This is part of the Egyptian government's larger plan to build political and economic links with both Libya and Sudan, including to Wadi Halfa.

== See also ==
- Cairo Light Rail Transit
- Egyptian National Railways
