= Niko Warbanoff =

German industrial engineer

- Born: 1975 (age 49–50); Stuttgart, Germany
- Education: Esslingen University of Applied Sciences
- Occupation(s): CEO of the DB E.C.O. Group; CEO of DB International Operations

Niko Warbanoff (born 1975) is a German industrial engineer and corporate executive. He is the CEO of the DB E.C.O. Group and DB International Operations.

== Biography ==
Niko Warbanoff was born in Stuttgart, Germany, in 1975. He studied industrial engineering at the University of Applied Sciences in Esslingen, Germany.

After earning his degree, he worked for Daimler for almost ten years, where he held many management positions around the globe, before starting his career with Deutsche Bahn in 2009.

Initially responsible for special tasks for the CEO of Deutsche Bahn AG, Warbanoff joined the board of managing directors of DB International in 2010 and was appointed chairman a year later. When DB International, responsible for projects in Germany and abroad and DB Projektbau, responsible for the domestic German market, merged to form DB Engineering & Consulting (DB E&C) in 2016, Warbanoff was appointed CEO of the new company, a position he held until the end of 2023.

During 2017 and 2018, DB International Operations was founded to offer operations and maintenance services around the world, but mainly outside of Europe. In addition, DB E&C acquired infraView GmbH to strengthen its digital expertise, leading to the founding of the DB E.C.O. Group in 2019, of which Niko Warbanoff has held the position of CEO since its inception. As a full-service provider, DB E.C.O. Group offers services from planning to technical implementation and operations from a single source. In 2020, DB E.C.O. Group expanded its digital presence by acquiring ESE Engineering und Software-Entwicklung GmbH. Since September 2021, the consulting and digital company inno2grid GmbH has also contributed to the growth of the DB E.C.O. Group. Under Warbanoff's leadership, the "Perform2Grow" strategy was introduced in 2012, targeting €450 million in revenue and 2,500 employees by 2020. In 2016, DB International merged with DB ProjektBau to form DB Engineering & Consulting, consolidating technical expertise. Before the establishment of DB E.C.O. Group in 2019, DB Engineering & Consulting (DB E&C) undertook a significant project in Qatar. DB E&C worked on the development and construction of the Doha Metro. It provided technical and project management expertise for the design, tender process, and final implementation of the metro system, including its various phases and operational lines. Additionally, DB E&C supported the establishment of a Railway Safety Regulatory Body to ensure the safe operation of the Doha Metro network and other railway operators in Qatar. DB E.C.O. Group has since grown, reaching €857 million in revenue and an order backlog of over €12 billion in 2023, with a workforce of 7,800 employees.

In August 2022, Warbanoff was appointed CEO of DB International Operations GmbH (DB IO), which Warbanoff founded in 2017. DB IO was awarded contracts for the planning, operation, and maintenance of a 450-kilometer route network in Canada, which is yet to become operational. The company was also awarded a 12-year contract for rail operations and maintenance of the first regional rapid transit system (RRTS) in Delhi, India.

Niko Warbanoff is a member of the board of trustees of bbw University in Berlin, a member of the executive committee, and the spokesperson of the Central Asia Working Group within the German Eastern Business Association. He also serves as a board member of the German Near and Middle East Association (NUMOV) and a member of the board of directors at Stadler Rail AG.
