= DB E.C.O. Group =

DB E.C.O. Group is a German conglomerate that resulted in 2019 from the integration of several Deutsche Bahn subsidiaries and affiliates.

== History ==
DB E.C.O. Group originated from Deutsche Eisenbahn-Consulting, established in 1966. DB E.C.O. Group was founded in 2019 in Germany. E.C.O. stands for the three business units engineering, consulting, and operations—the areas of expertise that Deutsche Bahn (DB) is combining in the group. In 2002, DE-Consult became a wholly owned subsidiary of DB. In 2003, it transitioned into an affiliate of the newly formed DB ProjektBau.

By 2007–2008, DE-Consult became DB International and operated as an independent company within the DB Group. DB International is focused on client business in domestic and international markets, while DB ProjektBau concentrated on domestic projects.

In 2016, DB ProjektBau and DB International merged, forming DB Engineering & Consulting.

In 2017–2018, the company acquired infraView.

In 2019, DB Engineering & Consulting, DB International Operations, and infraView merged under the DB E.C.O. Group.

In 2020–2021, DB Engineering & Consulting acquired engineering and software developer ESE GmbH and acquired shares in inno2grid. In April 2022, DB International Operations was contracted as the leading partner in a joint venture with the planning, operation, and maintenance of the 450-kilometre route network in Canada. The project is set to completely modernize and expand the network. With an operating and maintenance volume in the double-digit billion range, this is one of Deutsche Bahn's largest projects.

In July 2022, DB International Operations was awarded a 12-year contract for rail operations and maintenance of India's first regional rapid transit system by the National Capital Region Transport Corporation. The project covers a distance of 82 kilometers and connects urban nodes across the National Capital Region to Delhi.

In 2022, the DBCC Transport consortium, led by DB International Operations, has been contracted to operate a 273-kilometer line in Uruguay, which is part of a major government investment program centering around the pulp mill of Finnish forest industry company UPM. The contract, which has been signed over a period of 25 years, covers not operations, design, and maintenance of special freight wagons and locomotives. Each year, the freight rail line can transport over two million tons of pulp from a UPM pulp mill in central Uruguay to the port in Montevideo.

The Egyptian government has awarded the contract to operate the largest rail project in the country to DB International Operations and the Egyptian company Elsewedy Electric (EE) in 2022. The contract, which has an initial term of 15 years, is worth over a billion euros. The network covers 2,000 route kilometers, making it the sixth-largest high-speed network in the world. A consortium led by Siemens Mobility will build the infrastructure and supply the passenger trains and freight locomotives.

In 2023, DB Engineering & Consulting was awarded a multimillion-euro contract for the first underground metro project in the western Balkans, leading the project in an international joint venture with Systra. The project includes the design and construction of Line 1 in Belgrade, Serbia, which connects the southwestern and southeastern parts of Belgrade from Železnik station to Mirijevo station. The line is 21.2 km long and includes 21 stations.

In 2023, DB Engineering & Consulting reached a new agreement with Kazakhstan Railways KTZ on consulting services for passenger transport and rail freight. The contract is set to run for three years. DB Engineering & Consulting has already provided consulting services to KTZ's passenger transport division. One aim of the consulting work in rail freight transport is to increase traffic between Kazakhstan and Central Europe on the Eurasian corridor and integrate it into the European transport system.

In 2024, Deutsche Bahn has announced the modernization of the rail network in Germany, with a focus on the general overhaul of high-performance corridors, promoting environmentally friendly rail transport due to its central location and high usage. The general overhaul of the heavily used corridors is a long-term project that is set to cover a total of 40 route sections by 2030. As a part of the largest infrastructure program since the 1994 Rail Reform, the upcoming measures will begin with the general overhaul of the heavily used sections of the Riedbahn, a 70-kilometer line between Frankfurt am Main and Mannheim.

== Activities ==
DB E.C.O. Group operates through three primary business units: engineering, consulting, and operations. Engineering for rail infrastructure design and construction, with core products focusing on mobile and digital data capture and BIM methodology in the areas of design, construction supervision, project management, validation and assessment, and environmental and geoservices.

Consulting for mobility and logistics services and digitalization, with core products focusing on rail and intermodal logistics, strategy and organization, training and expertise, zero emission mobility and IT services. Operations and maintenance of railway systems outside of Europe, with core products focusing on passenger and freight transport, strategic train service planning, condition monitoring and diagnostics, rolling stock, and system integration.

DB E.C.O. Group is headquartered in Berlin, Germany. It consists of DB Engineering & Consulting, DB International Operations, infraView, ESE Engineering und Software-Entwicklung, inno2grid, and DB E.C.O. North America (an independent member of DB Group governed by a board of directors appointed by its shareholder, DB US Holding Corporation) as well as local companies, subsidiaries and investments worldwide. As of April 2024, the company employs 8,200 individuals.

Niko Warbanoff has served as the CEO since 2019.

== Subsidiaries ==
=== DB International Operations ===
DB International Operations GmbH
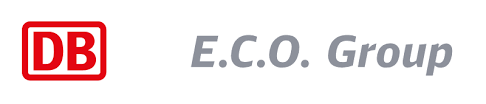
- Type: GmbH
- Industry: Rail Transport
- Founded: 2017; 9 years ago
- Founder: Deutsche Bahn AG
- Headquarters: Berlin, Germany
- Area served: Global
- Key people: Niko Warbanoff (CEO)
- Products: Operation and maintenance of rail infrastructure and vehicles
- Services: Passenger and freight rail transport, rail infrastructure maintenance
- Number of employees: 80 (2023)
- Parent: Deutsche Bahn AG
- Website: io.deutschebahn.com/en/
- Footnotes; Part of the DB E.C.O. Group

DB International Operations (DB IO) offers integrated rail operations and maintenance (O&M) for passenger and freight services as well as rail infrastructure globally. The company was founded in 2017 and is headquartered in Berlin, Germany. DB IO has subsidiaries in North America, South America, Middle East and Asia. It operates globally as part of the DB E.C.O. Group.

DB International Operations was founded in 2017 in Germany as a subsidiary of Deutsche Bahn and a part of DB E.C.O. Group.

In July 2022, DB IO secured a contract with the National Capital Region Transport Corporation (NCRTC) to manage the operation and maintenance of India's first regional rapid transit system (RRTS).

DB IO won a contract in April 2022 to plan, operate, and maintain rail passenger transport in the Toronto metropolitan region. The client for this project is Metrolinx, a crown agency of the Government of Ontario that manages and integrates road and public transport in the Greater Toronto and Hamilton Area.

In November 2022, DB IO, along with Egyptian company Elsewedy Electric, secured a contract to operate Egypt's first high-speed rail network.

DB IO is active in the following projects, wholly or partially owning the operations:

- In July 2022, DB IO secured a 12-year contract from the National Capital Region Transport Corporation (NCRTC) to manage the operation and maintenance of India’s first regional rapid transit system (RRTS).
- As part of a consortium consisting of Aecon, FCC Construcción and Alstom, DB IO won the contract in April 2022 to plan, operate, and maintain rail passenger transport in the Toronto metropolitan region. The GO Rail Expansion - On-Corridor Works project is one of the largest transportation projects in Canada, comprising significant modernization and expansion plans.
- DB IO was contracted to operate a freight line in Uruguay as part of a government investment program, serving a new pulp mill. This 25-year contract involves operations, design, and maintenance of specialized freight wagons and locomotives.
- In November 2022, DB IO, along with Egyptian company Elsewedy Electric, secured a contract to operate Egypt's first high-speed rail network. The 15-year contract encompasses a large new railway system from the Mediterranean to the Red Sea, making it one of Egypt's largest rail projects.
