= Electrical Safety First =

UK charity

- Formation: 1956
- Legal status: Non-profit; NGO
- Purpose: Promoting best practice, research, media campaigns, literature, advice
- Headquarters: London, United Kingdom
- Region served: UK
- Chief Executive: Lesley Rudd
- Website: www.electricalsafetyfirst.org.uk

Electrical Safety First (formerly the Electrical Safety Council, or ESC) is a registered UK charity working with all sectors of the electrical industry as well as local and central government to reduce deaths and injuries caused by electrical accidents.

Research shows that every year 2.5 million adults get an electric shock in their homes or garden, any of which could have caused injury or death. In 2007, according to government statistics, there were 19 deaths and 2,788 injuries caused by electric shocks. In addition, electricity is now the major cause of accidental domestic fires in UK homes with over 21,000 in 2007. In that same year there were 49 deaths and 3,477 injuries. The charity, through its activities and partnerships, aims to ensure that consumers’ needs are recognised and that issues of electrical safety are given the appropriate priority.

== History ==
Electrical Safety First was established as the National Inspection Council for Electrical Installation Contracting (NICEIC) in 1956. The National Inspection Council was in turn created from the National Register of Electrical Contractors, established in 1923, an organisation set up to provide protection for consumers against unsafe electrical wiring and equipment. Significant events in their history:

- 1956 NICEIC set up
- 1959 First NICEIC newsletter published
- 1970s Around 18,000 separate electrical installations inspected each year
- 1971 NICEIC is registered as a charity.org
- 1983 First computer introduced into NICEIC Head Office
- 1986 NICEIC Head Office moves to Vintage House, London
- 1988 NICEIC forms NQA, National Quality Assurance
- 1992 16th Edition of IEE Wiring Regulations adopted as British Standard
- 1998 NICEIC Roll published on CD-ROM and website
- 2000 NICEIC becomes a UKAS accredited certification body
- 2002 Technical Manual launched
- 2005 The charity was renamed the Electrical Safety Council and started to carry out the charitable objectives of the National Inspection Council for Electrical Installation Contracting. NICEIC Group Ltd formed to carry out the commercial aspects of the National Inspection Council for Electrical Installation Contracting.
- 2006 Electrical Safety Council sets up its offices in Buckingham Gate, London
- 2014 Rebrands and becomes Electrical Safety First

== Activities ==
Electrical Safety First promotes electrical safety and changes in attitude and behaviour by raising consumer and industry awareness of the issues and risks through:

- General awareness campaigns
- Campaigns in areas of risk
- Events
- Product Recalls
- Influencing other stakeholders to consider consumer needs.
- Technical publications
- Chairing working groups, such as the Electrical Installation Forum
- Standards-setting committees
- Grants

== Grants ==
Every year Electrical Safety First awards funding to a range of organisations, from both the Electrical Fire Safety Fund and the Home Improvement Grant Scheme. The Electrical Fire Safety Fund aims to support the delivery of project-based fire prevention initiatives at local community level that aim to effectively tackle the causes of electrical-related fires, and those that seek to increase public awareness. During this process Electrical Safety First works closely with the Fire Service, CFOA and Local Authorities around the UK.

== Joint venture ==
In November 2012 Electrical Safety First joined up with the Electrical Contractors' Association (ECA) to launch the Electrical Safety Register - a joint venture between the two organisations. The register features both domestic and commercial contractors, and brings together the NICEIC, and ECA certification schemes.

Electrical Safety First and ECA together own Certsure LLP, which trades using the NICEIC and ELECSA certification brands.

== Rebrand ==
In late 2013 the Electrical Safety Council announced that it is undergoing a rebranding, and that as of 28 March 2014 it would become Electrical Safety First. The rebrand was launched alongside a YouTube video which brought popular 70s/ 80s animation Charley Says back to life, with the help of David Walliams who provided the voiceovers.

== See also ==
- BS 7671
- Electrical wiring (UK)
- Institution of Engineering and Technology
- Council for Registered Gas Installers
- Electrical Contractors' Association
- SELECT (Electrical Contractors' Association of Scotland)
- NICEIC

=== Video clips ===
- How to stay safe
- Electric Chipmunks
- Beauty Burns
- Charley Says
