= Safety certificate =

Safety certificate may refer to:

- Safety certificate (EU railway), issued by a national safety authority to a railway company in the European Union under the EU directive 2016/798
- Landlord's gas safety certificate, required by United Kingdom for all rental accommodations
- Safety certification, for professionals operating in the domains of safety, health, or the environment
