= Charlie Says =

Charlie Says may refer to:

- Charlie Says (2006 film), a French film directed by Nicole Garcia
- Charlie Says (2018 film), an American film directed by Mary Harron
- Charley Says, a British series of public information films for children made in the 1970s and 1980s
