= Graeme Jones (football executive) =

Scottish sports scientist and executive

- Education: Edinburgh's Telford College; Edinburgh Napier University
- Occupations: Sports scientist and football executive
- Years active: 2005–present
- Employer: Heart of Midlothian F.C.
- Title: Sporting director

Graeme Jones is a Scottish sports scientist and football executive who has been sporting director of Heart of Midlothian since November 2024. He worked for the Scottish Football Association (SFA) from 2015 to 2024, latterly as performance director. He previously worked as a sports scientist and physiologist, including roles at the Hampden Sports Clinic, Raith Rovers, and as a fitness coach for UEFA.

== Early life and education ==
Jones grew up in East Lothian. He studied sports coaching and development at Edinburgh's Telford College, now part of Edinburgh College. After two years there, he joined the third year of the sport and exercise science degree at Edinburgh Napier University, graduating with second-class honours in 2005. He later completed a master's degree in sports medicine and exercise science in Glasgow.

Edinburgh Napier gave him an Alumni Excellence Award in 2024.

== Career ==
=== Sports science ===
While studying for his master's degree, Jones worked part-time as an applied physiologist at the Hampden Sports Clinic. He also held a sports science post at Raith Rovers and taught at a college in Fife.

He later joined the Hampden clinic full-time, working with Scottish football referees and athletes in other sports. He was also employed by UEFA as a fitness coach.

=== Scottish Football Association ===
Jones joined the SFA in August 2015 as head of football science and medicine. He was made head of high performance in October 2017.

In March 2018, the Daily Record profiled Jones's work on the SFA's use of performance data. It reported that the association had invested in GPS monitoring the previous year, later than the associations in the other home nations, and was comparing data from international sessions with information supplied by players' clubs to judge their usual training loads.

Interviewed by Training Ground Guru in 2020, Jones said the high-performance department had only three staff when he took charge: a doctor, a physiotherapist and a sports scientist. He said GPS tracking and data analysis were not being used at the time. More staff were brought into sports science, medicine, match analysis and recovery during his first six months. The department also began sharing more fitness information with clubs and changing training loads during international camps.

One episode of Jones's SFA career attracted wider attention. Before Scotland's UEFA Euro 2020 qualifying match in Kazakhstan in March 2019, he appeared on television to explain why the squad would remain on United Kingdom time in Astana. The clip was mocked after Scotland lost 3-0. Jones told The Times in 2024 that he still believed the preparation had been right, although he thought he had explained it badly.

The interview became part of the wider criticism of the SFA after the defeat. In a Daily Record opinion column, Gordon Parks presented it as an example of broader failings within the association. Scotland international Robert Snodgrass later defended Jones in The Daily Telegraph, saying the criticism had been misplaced and describing him as one of the main people trying to move the national team forward.

Jones stayed in post when Steve Clarke replaced Alex McLeish later in 2019. The Times reported that Jones and Clarke were not initially close and had difficult discussions about working practices, but that Jones later handled much of the performance and logistical work around Clarke's squad.

The SFA promoted him to performance director in December 2023. He had responsibility across the men's, women's and youth national teams, including medicine, sports science, analysis, scouting and talent identification. He also dealt with travel, accommodation and training arrangements for the men's senior squad.

Jones joined Scottish Squash as a non-executive director in 2020, with responsibility for performance.

=== Heart of Midlothian ===
Hearts announced Jones's appointment in September 2024 and he started work on 25 November. The club gave him responsibility for recruitment, performance and the academy, covering both the men's and women's football departments.

Jones had already been involved in the appointment of Neil Critchley as head coach before formally taking up the post. Former Scotland women's manager Shelley Kerr was appointed technical development manager soon after his arrival. Her work focused on the route from the academy to the men's first team.

The Times reported in October 2025 that Jones was Hearts' only point of contact with Jamestown Analytics. He received the company's recruitment and performance analysis and passed its reports on the first team to head coach Derek McInnes.

Critchley was dismissed in April 2025. Jones worked with Jamestown Analytics on the names put before the Hearts board, and McInnes was appointed the following month.

McInnes left for Rangers in June 2026. Hearts appointed Wouter Vrancken as his replacement after an online meeting and a day-long interview. Jones said Vrancken had first come to the club's attention through its analytical work.
