= Edinburgh College Students' Association =

- Motto: Powered by students, Driven by values, Committed to better
- Institution: Edinburgh College
- Location: Edinburgh, Scotland, United Kingdom
- Established: 2012
- President: Skye Marriner
- Other sabbatical officers: Jon Craig (VP Activities), Luna Morrison (VP Welfare)
- Members: c. 20,000 total
- Affiliations: Edinburgh Student Forum, National Union of Students
- Website: https://ecsa.scot

Edinburgh College Students' Association (ECSA) is an autonomous, student-run campaigning and membership organisation that promotes, defends and extends student rights and provides services and representation at Edinburgh College, Scotland.

Following the decision to merge Edinburgh's Stevenson College, Jewel and Esk Valley College and Telford College the respective students' associations at each institution united to form a new association in advance of the merger of the Colleges to provide continuity to students.

The association has three full-time elected student officers, and four staff members. Additionally, it has been awarded two rounds of Scottish Government Climate Challenge Funding, which enables the association to employ two full-time Sustainability Officers. ECSA is a member of the National Union of Students.
