= ECSA =

ECSA may refer to:

- Electoral Commission of South Africa
- Edinburgh College Students' Association
- Editorial Complutense
- Electoral Commission of South Australia
- Electrochemical active surface area
- Engineering Council of South Africa
- European Citizen Science Association
- European Composer and Songwriter Alliance
- European Community Shipowners' Associations
