= Actuate UK =

UK trade association

- Formation: 1993 (as SEC Group); 2021 (as Actuate UK)
- Type: Trade association
- Legal status: Non-profit company
- Purpose: Representing UK specialist engineering membership bodies
- Location(s): Rotherwick House, 3 Thomas More St, St Katharine's & Wapping, London E1W 1YZ
- Region served: UK
- Members: eight engineering membership associations
- Website: Actuate UK

Actuate UK is an alliance of eight specialist engineering membership associations in the United Kingdom. It was formally launched in February 2021, in some respects superseding, but expanding on the activities of, the Specialist Engineering Contractors' Group which operated between 1993 and January 2021.

== History ==
The SEC Group represented seven organisations which collectively comprised over 60,000 companies, with a total workforce of over 300,000 individuals. It was particularly active in the areas of achieving: more cost effective procurement; fair and prompt payment and protection of cash retentions; supporting excellence and innovation; and the early involvement of specialist contractors in construction projects to ensure more effective delivery. In Scotland the SEC Group operated separately as "SEC Group Scotland".

After leading the SEC Group for more than 30 years, chief executive Rudi Klein retired in January 2021, and the SEC Group closed in early 2021.

Actuate UK, the new engineering services sector alliance, has a wider focus, including commercial issues, sustainability (notably low to no carbon solutions), skills and building safety. It was launched on 10 February 2021.

== Members ==
- Building Engineering Services Association
- Building Services Research and Industry Association
- Chartered Institution of Building Services Engineers
- Electrical Contractors' Association
- Federation of Environmental Trade Associations
- Lift and Escalator Industry Association
- SELECT - the Electrical Contractors' Association for Scotland
- Scottish and Northern Ireland Plumbing Employers' Federation
