= Stevenson College, Edinburgh =

Coordinates: 55°55′34″N 3°17′24″W

Stevenson College Edinburgh, was a further education college in Edinburgh, Scotland. It was founded in 1970, and was named after famous Scottish engineer, Robert Stevenson. In 2012 it merged with Telford College and Jewel & Esk College to form part of the newly established Edinburgh College.

The college had five faculties offering a wide range of subjects:

- Access & Continuing Education
- Business, Administration & Languages
- Creative Arts
- Early Education, Health & Social Care
- Science, Sport & Engineering

The college welcomed approximately 17,000 students each year, of which approx. 1000 were from overseas.

International Students

Stevenson College Edinburgh catered to the needs of a wide range of international students from all over the world. Students could study English Language, university foundation courses as well as higher education programmes. The main intakes were in August and January every year. A summer school took place every summer through the months of June, July and August. As well as individual international students, the college could provide bespoke training to groups from overseas, including professional training in a huge range of subjects.
