= British Approvals Service for Cables =

- Logo used since 2014
- Abbreviation: BASEC
- Founded: 1971
- Type: Nationally Recognized Testing Laboratory
- Headquarters: Milton Keynes, United Kingdom
- Region served: Worldwide
- Services: Cable certification QMS certification EMS certification HSMS certification Process capability assessment Independent investigation
- Business Unit Director: Paul Munday
- Affiliations: UKAS; BSI; NICEIC; UL
- Website: www.basec.org.uk

British Approvals Service for Cables (commonly known as BASEC) is an independent accredited certification body headquartered in Milton Keynes, United Kingdom. Here, the organization's dedicated testing laboratory also operates which is believed to be the largest of its type in Europe. BASEC was established in 1971 and principally provides product certification services for all types of cable and wire, ancillary products and management systems within the cable industry. The organization maintains operations throughout the world including Africa, Middle East, America, Asia and Europe.

BASEC also offers process capability assessment in cable making, certification of innovative and variant cable products, and provides independent investigation, testing and advice in connection with the manufacture or use of cables, or in the event of disputes.

== History ==
BASEC has been testing and certifying electrical cables for over forty years. The organization was formed in 1971 by a number of leading industry bodies, including BSI, BCA, The Institution of Electrical Engineers (IEE), and The Electrical Contractors Association (ECA), a group which has now been joined by The National Inspection Council for Electrical Installation Contracting (NICEIC). By examination of manufacturers' production processes and controls, and testing, BASEC ensures that products meet appropriate British, European and International standards.

The organization's Board and Certification Committee provides independent governance. BASEC is Government-nominated and accredited by UKAS, demonstrating competence, impartiality and reliability in its ability to deliver results. BASEC is a member of the HAR agreement group of European Committee for Electrotechnical Standardization (CENELEC). This provides certification to harmonised cables within Europe in accordance with the harmonization standard. BASEC provides HAR scheme certification to manufacturers based in the UK and Ireland, where certified cables are marked with the approval legend BASEC <HAR>. BASEC is affiliated with and supports the work of the Approved Cables Initiative (ACI) in seeking a cross market solution to the problem of sub-standard and counterfeit cable in the UK market.

== Product certification ==
BASEC's main approval service is Product Certification which applies to individual cable types. All products are rigorously tested to meet necessary and appropriate standards through detailed examination of manufacturers production processes and controls. Product samples are retrieved from the client manufactures on which BASEC then carries out tests at its accredited laboratories in Milton Keynes. BASEC also verifies that products fully comply with the relevant specification by full type testing at independent laboratories or by witnessing tests at the client factory. Manufacturers may apply for a license to display the BASEC mark on their products only when BASEC is satisfied that their manufacturing systems are capable of consistently producing cable products. After having attained a BASEC Product Marking License they are subjected to regular factory audits and products surveillance testing. BASEC issues certificates to unique, specific products when they have passed thorough testing and the manufacturer can demonstrate ongoing conformity.

Cables are tested against the requirements of the relevant standards for characteristics such as:

- Electrical and/or data signal breakdown
- Flexing, abrasion resistance and impact performance
- Stretching characteristics of the insulating material
- Operational properties at high and low temperatures
- Cable construction and dimensions within defined tolerances
- Conductivity

The organization has extended its United Kingdom Accreditation Service (UKAS) accreditation to include ISO/IEC 17025.

== Management System certification ==
Most cable manufacturers, distributors and service providers now operate with formalised management systems. These give customers a degree of reassurance that the organization has procedures and processes in place that will assist in the delivery of a product, process or service that conforms to expectations, and that if things go wrong then the organization will respond appropriately. BASEC provides management system certification to cable manufacturers and other organizations involved within the cables sector. Assessment may be to an individual standard or to two or more in an integrated manner, such as:

- Quality management systems to ISO 9001
- Environmental management systems to ISO 14001
- Health and Safety management systems to OHSAS 18001

BASEC's own approach to management system certification is tailored specifically to cable making. It is designed to assess an organizations ability to produce goods and services consistently to specification and customer requirements in a safe manner with due regard to the environment. BASEC is accredited by UKAS against ISO/IEC 17021 for QMS certification and for EMS certification.

== Construction Products Regulation (CPR) ==
As of 1 July 2017 under the European Construction Products Regulation (CPR), it is now mandatory for cable manufacturers and suppliers to apply CE marking to any products covered by the harmonised European standard EN 50575. The CPR applies to all cables placed on the market for use in fixed installation in domestic, commercial and industrial premises and other civil engineering works anywhere in the European Union. It applies to power, communications and fibre optic cables irrespective of the place of manufacture. These tests with a few exceptions need to be carried out by an independent Notified Body. BASEC is designated Notified Body No. 2662 for the CPR System 1+ and System 3.

BASEC has the fire test equipment to undertake the following tests:

- Heat of combustion EN ISO 1716
- Heat release and smoke production EN 50399
- Vertical flame propagation EN 60332-1-2
- Smoke density EN 61034-2
- Acidity / acid gas content EN 60754-2

== The BASEC mark ==
The BASEC mark found upon approved cable products is a recognized sign of assurance of independent cable testing and approval. Manufacturers may apply for a license to display the BASEC mark on their products only when BASEC is satisfied that their manufacturing systems are capable of consistently producing safe cable products, through assessment to the BASEC Product Certification Requirements. Manufacturers also have the option of displaying the BASEC name or roundel on reels and drums. BASEC approved manufacturers recognize quality and safety and this should be seen as a sign of assurance for contractors, customers and wholesalers.

Cable standards not only specify the dimensions and materials of a cable, they also require that a range of specific tests are undertaken to prove the construction and performance. Many non-approved cables have not been subject to the required tests. It is a common misunderstanding that a cable is compliant with standards or even BASEC approved just because the supplier claims that it has been produced to a particular standard. Cable marked with only a standard number should be treated with caution, it is probable that nobody independent of the manufacturer has examined that cable, and the claims made may be unreliable. Only cable marked with the BASEC name is BASEC approved, by demonstrating its compliance to the required standards.

== Investigation, testing and advice ==
Upon the occurrence of a concern, problem or dispute in relation to use of cables, for example in the case of failure or performance problems, BASEC can conduct an independent investigation into performance or compliance to a specification. This may include testing and the assessment of specifications. BASEC will use appropriate experts, and commission tailored examination and testing programs from suitable laboratories, to address the problem. The organization will advise on the cases of the problem and provide assistance with the selection of specifications. As an official Notified Body under the European Low Voltage Directive, BASEC can perform assessments and prepare technical reports for manufacturers and importers of cable products. BASEC is also able to provide expert witness services in cases of legal dispute.

== See also ==
- BSI Group
- European Committee for Electrotechnical Standardization (CENELEC)
- Fire test
- ISO 9000
- ISO 14000
- National Inspection Council for Electrical Installation Contracting (NICEIC)
- OHSAS 18001
- Product certification
- United Kingdom Accreditation Service (UKAS)
