= Gas Safety (Installation and Use) Regulations 1998 =

United Kingdom statutory legislation

- Statutory Instrument
- Parliament of the United Kingdom
- Citation: SI 1998/2451
- Introduced by: Alan Meale (Commons)
- Territorial extent: United Kingdom

Dates
- Made: 3 October 1998
- Laid before Parliament: 9 October 1998
- Commencement: 31 October 1998

Other legislation
- Amends: Gas Act 1986
- Repeals/revokes: Gas Safety (Installation and Use) Regulations 1994; Gas Safety (Installation and Use) (Amendment) Regulations 1996; Gas Safety (Installation and Use) (Amendment) (No. 2) Regulations 1996
- Made under: Health and Safety at Work etc. Act 1974
- Amended by: Gas Safety (Installation and Use) (Amendment) Regulations 2018

Status: Amended

Text of statute as originally enacted

Text of the Gas Safety (Installation and Use) Regulations 1998 as in force today (including any amendments) within the United Kingdom, from legislation.gov.uk.

The Gas Safety (Installation and Use) Regulations 1998 (SI 1998/2451) are a set of United Kingdom statutory instruments that regulate the installation, maintenance and use of gas systems, gas fittings and gas appliances using natural gas and liquefied petroleum gas (LPG). The regulations are made under powers contained within the Health and Safety at Work etc. Act 1974 and are enforced by the Health and Safety Executive (HSE).

The regulations place legal duties on a wide range of persons, including employers, self-employed gas engineers, landlords and occupiers of premises, to ensure that gas installations and appliances are installed and maintained safely so as to prevent injury, loss of life and damage to property arising from gas leaks, fire, explosion or carbon monoxide poisoning.

Although the term "landlord’s gas safety certificate" is widely used, it does not appear in the legislation itself. The regulations instead require landlords to ensure that a gas safety check is carried out at intervals of no more than 12 months and that a written record of that check is made and retained. A copy of this record must be provided to existing tenants within 28 days of the check, and to new tenants before they occupy the premises.

Key provisions of the regulations with which the public is most familiar include:

- the duties of landlords to ensure that gas appliances, pipework and flues in rented accommodation are maintained in a safe condition and are subject to an annual gas safety check, evidenced by a written record commonly referred to as a landlord’s gas safety certificate;
- the requirement that gas work is carried out only by persons who are competent and, where the work is undertaken in the course of business, are members of a class of persons approved by the Health and Safety Executive, currently those registered with the Gas Safe Register;
- requirements relating to the installation of flues, ventilation of premises, testing for gas tightness, and the safe isolation of gas supplies where appliances are found to be dangerous.

Practical guidance on compliance with the regulations is provided by the Health and Safety Executive in its Approved Code of Practice and guidance document, Safety in the installation and use of gas systems and appliances (L56), which explains how dutyholders can meet their legal obligations under the regulations."Safety in the installation and use of gas systems and appliances (Approved Code of Practice L56)" (PDF). Health and Safety Executive.
