= List of electrical cable manufacturers =

This table shows the biggest manufacturers of cable in terms of revenue. The revenues noted here are total revenue of the group as reported in financial statements. These may not represent the revenues from their cable business.

Country	Company	Employees	Revenue in billion USD (approx.)	Year	Notes
(United States)	Southwire	7,500	5.5	2020	
(France)	Nexans	25,000	6.4	2020	
(South Korea)	LS Cable & System	9,168	16.1	2021	
(Italy)	Prysmian Group	30,500	17.1	2022	
(Japan)	Furukawa Electric	4,192	4.6		
(Egypt)	Elsewedy Electric	14,000	1.1		
(Japan)	Furukawa Co.	44,853	3.1		
