= Central institution =

Type of higher education institute in 20th and 21st century Scotland

A central institution (CI) was a type of higher education institute in 20th and 21st-century Scotland, responsible for providing degree-level education but emphasising teaching rather than research. Some had a range of courses similar to polytechnics elsewhere in the United Kingdom while others were more specialised such as the art colleges and the conservatoire. Some subjects were not taught at CIs; for example, teacher training was only carried out by colleges of education, which later merged with universities.

Amongst the most common names for individual CIs were college of agriculture, college of art, and institute of technology. Of the five colleges of technology, Napier and Glasgow eventually changed their names to include the word polytechnic, Paisley took the name Paisley College, while Dundee and Robert Gordon became institutes of technology. Another CI, Leith Nautical College, Edinburgh, closed in 1987 by merger into the further education sector. Academic degrees were validated by the Council for National Academic Awards until 1992.

Like polytechnic, the term central institution is now rarely used since most of these institutions entered the university sector in 1992 when the Further and Higher Education Act 1992 came into effect. Those are referred to as post-1992 universities.

== List ==
The number of central institutions varied, but in 1988 the list included the following, several of which now have university status.

- Duncan of Jordanstone College of Art, Dundee (now part of the University of Dundee)
- Dundee Institute of Technology, Dundee (now Abertay University)
- East of Scotland College of Agriculture, Edinburgh (now part of the Scottish Agricultural College)
- Edinburgh College of Art, Edinburgh (now part of the University of Edinburgh)
- Glasgow College of Technology, Glasgow (later Glasgow Polytechnic, now part of Glasgow Caledonian University)
- The Glasgow School of Art, Glasgow
- Napier Polytechnic, of Edinburgh (now Edinburgh Napier University).
- North of Scotland College of Agriculture, Aberdeen (now part of the Scottish Agricultural College)
- Paisley College of Technology, Paisley (now University of the West of Scotland)
- Queen Margaret University College, formerly Queen Margaret College, Edinburgh (now Queen Margaret University)
- The Queen's College, Glasgow (now part of Glasgow Caledonian University)
- Robert Gordon's Institute of Technology, Aberdeen (now The Robert Gordon University)
- The Royal Scottish Academy of Music and Drama, Glasgow
- Scottish College of Textiles, Galashiels (now part of Heriot-Watt University, Edinburgh)
- The West of Scotland College, Auchincruive (now part of the Scottish Agricultural College)

=== Sources ===
- The Central Institutions (Recognition) (Scotland) Regulations 1988
- Records from the Queen's College, Glasgow
- Leith Nautical College 1846 - 1987

== See also ==
- Education in Scotland
- List of universities in Scotland
