= Council for Registered Gas Installers =

The Council for Registered Gas Installers (CORGI) operates a voluntary registration scheme for gas installers in the United Kingdom. From 1991 to 2009 registration with CORGI was a legal requirement for gas operatives and businesses throughout the UK, and before April 2010 in Northern Ireland and Guernsey.

CORGI registration requires (beside payment of fees) that gas operatives hold a certificate of competence under the Accredited Certification Scheme (ACS) demonstrating an appropriate level of competence and experience in particular types of gas work. The ACS replaced a number of different certification schemes in 1998.

CORGI lost its status as official registration body in England, Scotland and Wales on 1 April 2009 and in Northern Ireland and Guernsey in April 2010, with this role being taken on by the Gas Safe Register, run on behalf of the Health and Safety Executive by Capita Group.

== Background ==
CORGI was originally established in 1970 as the Confederation for the Registration of Gas Installers to operate a voluntary register. This followed a gas explosion in 1968 which led to the partial collapse of Ronan Point, a tower block in London.

Notwithstanding gas explosions, the greatest danger to the public in using gas is from carbon monoxide (CO), which is a highly toxic by-product of the combustion process. Most of the concern for gas safety focuses on avoiding excessive production of CO through adequate ventilation and correct combustion, and the safe dispersal of the small amounts produced by correct combustion through effective flue systems. Modern room-sealed gas appliances are much safer in this respect and the number of fatalities from CO poisoning has greatly declined. Each year in the UK around 30 people are killed as a result of CO poisoning.

== Previous responsibilities ==
CORGI was approved by the Health and Safety Executive, in 1991, as a body that could certify operatives for the installation and maintenance of gas equipment in both commercial and domestic properties. Under these responsibilities CORGI could also inspect registered businesses, and investigate and resolve complaints. Registration with CORGI was a legal requirement under the Gas Safety (Installation and Use) Regulations 1998 for any gas installation business. In 1996 it was estimated there were c. 50,000 CORGI registered businesses in the UK employing c. 120,000 gas operatives. CORGI set the standards for gas installation, however this did not include testing for Carbon Monoxide as this was deemed "unnecessary" if the equipment was maintained correctly.

CORGI was answerable to the Health and Safety Executive, which is the Government watchdog on all safety issues, including gas. The HSE has the authority to appoint CORGI and/or other agencies to operate the Register of Gas Installers. In 2006 another body (NAPIT) made an application to the HSE to operate a rival registration scheme. This application was turned down by the Health and Safety Executive. It is the CORGI view - a view that is supported by many other organisations too such as the All Party Parliamentary Gas Safety Group - that introducing another gas registration body would cause confusion. However some registered gas installers believe that CORGI's decision to run schemes for plumbing, electrics and ventilation will itself create public confusion, as well as taking away its focus from the prime consideration of gas safety. However, CORGI has been clear that gas safety is at the core of its business and will remain so. CORGI realises that gas installers often do jobs other than just gas and the decision to offer plumbing, electrical and ventilation schemes was made to help installers that are CORGI registered for gas to comply with Building Regulations in areas closely related to gas work.

== Controversy ==
Some gas installers, primarily individual, independent installers through associations such as ARGI (Association of Registered Gas Installers) felt that the organisation was overbearing and an excessive financial burden, and that little was being done to stop unregistered installers operating and that they were not being supported by or listened to by the organisation. There were also concerns that it abused its monopolistic position as the sole awarding body for UK gas installers. The perception was that CORGI used the customer and installer data to sell products and services (initially by including a sales booklet along with the Installation certificate sent to the customer), which some believed was contrary to their remit for the care of that data. Others considered that use of this data to promote gas safety, including products and services to installers and public safety information to consumers raised safety standards. The funds raised through the commercial operations also supported lower gas registration fees for installers - this was demonstrated by the fees barely increasing over the years that CORGI ran the gas scheme.

== CORGI Trust ==
In 2005, CORGI set up the CORGI Trust, which sees all profits from the commercial side of the business being donated to the Trust. These funds will then be used to help advance gas safety within the UK. Recommendations for the use of these funds has ranged from getting the Government to change the law so that only CORGI registered installers can buy gas appliances, through to doing a national television campaign to increase awareness on the need for customers to only use CORGI registered installers and the dangers of carbon monoxide.

== Gas Safe Register ==
Gas Safe Register is the official gas registration body for the United Kingdom, Isle of Man and Guernsey, appointed by the relevant Health and Safety Authority for each area. By law all gas operatives must be on the Gas Safe Register. Gas Safe Register replaced CORGI as the gas registration body in Great Britain and Isle of Man on 1 April 2009 and Northern Ireland and Guernsey on 1 April 2010.

Gas Safe Register work to protect the public from unsafe gas work through;

- a dedicated national investigations team tracking down individuals working illegally
- regular inspections of Gas Safe registered engineers
- educating consumers and raising awareness of gas safety
- investigating reports of unsafe gas work

Gas Safe Register is run by Capita Gas Registration and Ancillary Services Limited, a division of Capita plc.

As of 2010 the Gas Safe register has c. 137,000 registered installers. Both the Gas Safe and previous CORGI schemes have been seen to increase competence in gas installation, and are "associated with the declining number of gas accidents and deaths".

== See also ==
- Gas Safety (Installation and Use) Regulations 1998
- Landlord's gas safety certificate
- Health and Safety Executive
- Natural gas
- British Gas
