= Federation of Environmental Trade Associations =

- Abbreviation: FETA
- Legal status: Non-profit organization
- Purpose: Air-conditioning and refrigeration trade association in the UK
- Location: 2 Waltham Court, Milley Lane, Hare Hatch, Wokingham, Berkshire, RG10 9TH
- Region served: United Kingdom
- Members: Over 400 HVAC companies
- Chief Executive: Chris Yates
- Website: www.feta.co.uk

The Federation of Environmental Trade Associations (FETA) is a UK body which represents the interests of manufacturers, suppliers, installers and contractors within the refrigeration, heating, ventilating, and air conditioning industry. It is based in Hare Hatch (in the parish of Wargrave) near Wokingham.

== Membership ==
It comprises six associations:

- British Refrigeration Association (BRA)
- British Flue and Chimney Manufacturers Association (BFCMA)
- Association of Ductwork Contractors and Allied Services (ADCAS)
- Building Controls Industry Association (BCIA)
- Heating, Ventilating and Air Conditioning Manufacturers Association (HEVAC)
- Heat Pump Association (HPA)

== Activities ==
FETA works with government bodies, other associations and organisations.

- In 2020, FETA warned facilities managers about the need to have risk assessments with respect to DSEAR (Dangerous Substances and Explosive Atmospheres Regulations).
- In 2021, FETA was a founder member of an alliance of engineering services organisations, Actuate UK, launched on 10 February.

== See also ==
- Institute of Refrigeration
- Fire Extinguishing Trades Association
