= B&ES TR/19 =

BESA TR19 are the duct-work cleaning guidelines provided by Building Engineering Services Association (BESA) for internal cleanliness of ventilation systems. The guidelines were introduced in 2005 by amalgamation of pre-existing TR/17 and DW/TM2 guidelines. Once a system is TR19 compliant, it has been found that average total High Risk Combustion Load Levels (HR-CLLs) can be reduced by a total of 83%.

== History ==
The BESA TR19 guidelines were introduced in 2005 by updating the old TR/17 guidelines which were in effect from 1998. In 2014, TR19 was updated to reflect changes in European standard BS EN 15780:2011 – Ventilation for buildings – ductwork – cleanliness of ventilation systems. TR19 was updated to reflect the benchmarks and testing protocols as contained in BS EN 15780. The prime changes in TR19 2005 and 2014 versions are introduction of a CQC, testing protocol and test equipment specification, separation of new duct systems from existing systems and introduction of the RRFSO.
