= National Inspection Council for Electrical Installation Contracting =

- Abbreviation: NICEIC
- Formation: 1956
- Legal status: Voluntary Certification Body
- Purpose: Certification of businesses
- Headquarters: Warwick House, Houghton Hall Park
- Location: Houghton Regis, Central Bedfordshire
- Region served: UK
- Members: Over 38,000 certified businesses
- Managing Director: Richard Orton
- Parent organization: Certsure
- Website: www.niceic.com

The National Inspection Council for Electrical Installation Contracting, or NICEIC, is one of several organisations which assesses the competence of businesses undertaking electrical work in the United Kingdom. NICEIC is one of several providers given Government approval to offer Competent Person Schemes in England and Wales to oversee electrical work within the scope of Part P of the Building Regulations.

NICEIC also run certification schemes for plumbing, heating, and renewables as well as MCS and PAS certification schemes and has circa 38,000 businesses certified on its schemes, as well as being a leading industry training provider for electrical, gas, plumbing, heating, renewables qualifications.

Certsure LLP (which is owned by Electrical Safety First, a registered charity, and the Electrical Contractors’ Association (ECA), the electrotechnical industry trade body) trades under the certification brand of NICEIC.

== History ==
From 1923, an earlier organisation, the National Register of Electrical Installation Contractors, kept a register of approved electrical contractors. The NICEIC was incorporated on 10 August 1956.

== Headquarters ==
The NICEIC is situated next to the headquarters of Costa Coffee and Whitbread, north of the main industrial estate Houghton Regis, which is near to Dunstable.

== Certification ==
Businesses undertaking electrical work are certified by NICEIC to become Approved Contractors and/or Domestic Installers, meeting the NICEIC's scheme requirements for competence and the like kind. If work undertaken by the certified business is not up-to-standard, the NICEIC will correct it if necessary. Certified businesses are assessed by a team of local Assessors. Many local authorities only give work to NICEIC certified businesses.

To be a certified business undertaking electrical work, the business must:

- Ensure work is carried out to the current edition of BS 7671; the IET Wiring Regulations
- Ensure certification is issued on completion of installation work, as directed by BS 7671
- Ensure work meets the requirements of the Building Regulations / Standards and the like (where relevant)
- Have up-to-date copies of BS 7671
- Have competence with test instruments as outlined by Part 6 ("Inspection and Testing") of BS 7671; the IET Wiring Regulations
- Have public liability insurance of at least £2m.
- Have professional indemnity insurance of at least £250k if certified for periodic inspection.

== See also ==
- British Approvals Service for Cables
- Electrical wiring in the United Kingdom
- Gas Safe Register and its predecessor Council for Registered Gas Installers (CORGI)
- Electrical Contractors' Association
- SELECT (Electrical Contractors' Association of Scotland)
- Electrical Safety First, an education charity formed in 2005 formed from the NICEIC
