= Institute of Refrigeration =

British trade organization

- Abbreviation: IOR
- Formation: 1899
- Legal status: Non-profit company and registered educational and scientific charitable incorporated organisation 1166869)
- Purpose: Supporting the advancement of refrigeration and its application for the public benefit
- Location: Kelvin House, 76 Mill Lane, Carshalton, SM5 2JR
- Region served: UK
- Members: Refrigeration scientists, engineers and practitioners
- President: Steve Gill FInstR
- Main organ: IOR Board of Trustees
- Affiliations: International Institute of Refrigeration, ASHRAE, ACRIB
- Website: IOR

The Institute of Refrigeration (IOR) is an organisation in the UK that supports the refrigeration and air-conditioning industry.

== History ==
The Institute was formed in 1899 as the Cold Storage and Ice Association, the first national society in the world for the refrigeration industry. The Institute's first president was Alan Egerton, 3rd Baron Egerton. It became the IOR in 1944 when professional membership was introduced. In 2010 the Institute launched a short video explaining the opportunities for careers in the refrigeration industry under the title Careers in Cooling. This uses interviews with a wide range of young people working in different aspects of refrigeration and air-conditioning to explain what a rewarding career it can be. A webpage was also set up to support the video.

== Structure ==
The Institute of Refrigeration is governed by a board of trustees which comprises the President, the President-Elect, the Immediate Past-President, the Honorary Treasurer and six elected members.

The current council comprises

- President - Steve Gill FInstR
- Immediate Past-President - Lisa-Jayne Cook FInstR
- Hon Treasurer - John Skelton FInstR
- Elected Members - Steve Benton FInstR, David Bostock FInstR, Craig Girdlestone FInstR, Chris Griffiths MInstR, Rob Lamb FInstR, Sam Parris FInstR, John Skelton FInstR,

The work of the Institute is carried out by committees, including

- Membership Committee - chair Craig Girdlestone
- Membership Retention and Growth Committee - chair Lizzie Dunlop
- Technical Committee - chair David Paget
- Papers and Publications Committee - chair Dermot Cotter
- International Refrigeration Committee - chair Dr Andy Pearson
- IOR RACHP EngTech Section - chair Bob Wright
- Ethics and Conduct Committee - chair Kevin Glass
- Annual Dinner Steering Committee - chair Julie Murray
- Education Committee - chair Mike Gittoes
- Policy Review & Procedure Committee - chair Steve Benton
- Women in RACHP Network - co-chairs Samantha Buckell and Astrid Prado

== Past IOR Presidents ==
1899-1903: The Rt Hon Lord Egerton of Tatton

1903-1905: The Rt Hon Lord Whitburgh

1905-1907: Sir Charles Petrie JP

1907-1908: Sir Alfred L Jones KCMG

1908-1910: Sir E Montague Nelson, KCMG

1910-1912: Charles E Brightman

1912-1914: John T Milton DSc

1914-1915: Sir Alfred Seale Haslam, JP

1915-1918: The Hon Sir Thomas MacKenzie CGMG

1918-1920: Sir Joseph G Broodbank JP

1920-1921: Lt-Col Sir Thomas Robinson GBE, KCMGC

1921-1922: George Goodsir JP

1923-1926: Sir Gordon H Campbell KBE

1926-1929: Lt-Col Lord Dudley Gordon DSE, LLD

1929-1930: The Rt Hon Lord Kylsant GMCG

1930-1933: Sir William B Hardy DSc LLD FRS

1933-1934: Arthur Robert Thomas Woods

1934-1935: Robert S Forsyth CMG

1935-1936: Frank Ainsworth Willcox DSc

1936-1938: Ezer Griffiths OBE DSc FRS

1938-1940: Austin Chadwick

1940-1941: Basil Thomas Aitken

1941-1945: Stanley Fabes Dorey, CBE, DSc, FRS, WHEX

1945-1947: Kenneth Lightfoot OBE

1947-1949: William Stoddart Douglas BSc

1949-1952: The Rt Hon Vis Bruce of Melbourne PC CH MC FRS

1952-1955: Sir Charles G Darwin, KBE, MC, ScD, FRS

1955-1958: Lt-Col Lord Dudley Gordon DSO LLD

1958-1960: Sir Rupert de la Bere BART KCVO

1960-1961: Eng-Cmdr Walter Robert Sinclair RAN BEng

1961-1963: Charles Maurice Brain

1963-1964: William Stoddart Douglas BSc

1964-1966: Col Henry Randal Steward TD BSc

1966-1968: James Douglas BSc

1968-1969: James Arnold Brewster

1969-1972: John Archer Stonebanks

1972-1974: Kenneth Calvert Hales MA

1974-1977: William Bell Gosney BSc

1977-1981: Joseph James Wilson MBE

1981-1984: Geoffrey Gordon Haselden DSc

1984-1987: Edward J Perry CEng

1987-1989: Stephen Forbes Pearson BSc PhD ARCST

1989-1992: Colin Bailey BSc PhD CEng

1992-1994: Anthony Harold Brown BA CEng

1994-1996: Raymond Gluckman MA CEng

1996-1997: Peter John Cooper OBE CEng

1997-2000: Robert David Heap MBE BSc CEng

2000-2004: John Ellis LCG

2004-2007: Guy Francis Hundy PhD FIMechE

2007-2010: Jane A Gartshore BSc(Eng)

2010-2013: Andy B Pearson BSc BEng PhD CEng

2013-2016: Graeme G Maidment CEng MIMechE

2016-2018: Steve C Gill FIET MCIBSE MASHRAE

2018-2020: Kevin P Glass

2020-2022: Mike Creamer

2022-2024: Graeme Fox CEng MCIBSE

2024-2026: Lisa-Jayne Cook

== Branches ==
It has branches covering:

- Hampshire & Surrounding Counties - Hampshire Refrigeration Society (HRS)
- East Anglia
- Northern
- Scotland

and co-operates with independent refrigeration societies in Hampshire (HRS), Birmingham and London as well as international organisations Irish Institute of Refrigeration, ASHRAE, ISHRAE, PHVAR

== Purpose ==
The purpose of the Institute of Refrigeration is outlined in the Institute's constitution as follows:

a) The general advancement of refrigeration in all its applications, in relation both to the perfection of its methods, and to the extension of its services to the community.

b) To promote means for communication between members and their interchange of views.

c) To encourage invention and research in all matters relating to the science and practice of refrigeration.

d) To promote a sustainable approach to all aspects of refrigeration system design and operation

e) To co-operate with educational institutions for the furtherance of education in the science and practice of refrigeration.

f) To hold meetings of the Institute for reading and discussing papers dealing with refrigeration and allied subjects.

g) To publish and distribute the proceedings or reports of the Institute.

h) To do all other things, incidental or conducive to the attainment of the above objects or any of them.

It is a registered Charitably Incorporated Organisation (not-for-profit) comprising nearly 2500 individual members. The IOR runs international conferences and events based in the UK on technical topics of general interest to the refrigeration, air conditioning and heat pump industry. The IOR publishes an annual set of Technical Proceedings as well as Safety Alerts, Guidance Notes and Good Practice Guides for Technicians and a set of Codes of Practice for different refrigerant groups. It also offers e-learning on alternative refrigerants and a programme of accessible webinars. The IOR ran a well publicised campaign called REAL Zero which had a significant impact on improving refrigerant containment, and was turned into an e-learning programme at www.realzero.org.uk.

=== Membership ===
There are five main grades of membership; Associate, Technician, Member, Fellow and Student/Young Persons. Membership grade is based on relevant experience and responsibilities gained over time in the industry and is determined by application to the membership committee. Affiliate Membership is offered to individuals without suitable experience. The Institute is a professional affiliate of the UK Engineering Council and has many overseas members. It has formal agreements to share information and co-operate with ASHRAE (USA), ISHRAE (India), PHVAR (Pakistan) and AIRAH (Australia).

== See also ==
- Air Conditioning, Heating and Refrigeration Institute
- Federation of Environmental Trade Associations
- American Society of Heating, Refrigerating and Air-Conditioning Engineers (ASHRAE)
- Chiller
- Psychrometrics
