= Electrical Contractors' Association =

British trade association

ECA
- Abbreviation: ECA
- Formation: 1901
- Type: Trade association
- Legal status: Non-profit company (No. 00143669)
- Purpose: Supporting and representing electrotechnical and other engineering services companies in England, Northern Ireland and Wales
- Location: London, E1
- Region served: Covering UK, excluding Scotland
- Members: c. 2700 companies
- Group Chief Executive Officer: Steve Bratt
- Main organ: (President: elected annually)
- Affiliations: EuropeOn - formerly Association Européenne de l'Installation Electrique, Actuate UK, Build UK
- Staff: 100
- Website: ECA

ECA (formerly the Electrical Contractors' Association) is the main trade association for companies involved in electrotechnical and other technical engineering projects in England, Northern Ireland and Wales. In 2022 it had some 2600 registered members - companies who collectively generated annual revenues of over £6billion (e.g. the UK electrical contracting industry is worth in excess of £10 billion). ECA also has associate categories open to industry manufacturers, distributors, educators, clients and specifiers who wish to engage and collaborate with members.

ECA is currently either leading or active across a range of built environment, building, construction, maintenance, and infrastructure issues, and in particular those relating to electrical engineering, mainly in the commercial, industrial and public sectors, as well as the domestic arena. Key areas of activity include: technical; standards; skills; health and safety; renewable, energy efficiency and other energy installations; supply chain procurement and payment; digitalisation; and employment issues.

== History ==
Founded in 1901, ECA represents contractors who design, install, inspect, test, monitor, and maintain electrical and electronic equipment and services. It was incorporated on 19 April 1916. ECA became the official trading name of 'Electrical Contractors' Association' in autumn 2017.

=== Industry improvements ===
ECA played a particularly important part in the 1920s and 1930s when electric power was introduced to most houses. Before this time, and the formation of the National Grid, electricity was supplied at different voltages and frequencies.

Today, ECA actively represents the electrical and electronic contracting sectors, taking a leading role in both technical standards (notably BS 7671) and professional competencies in both the domestic and commercial sectors.

It has diversified to cover not just electrical engineering, but also fire and security, datacomms, energy provision, building management systems, audiovisual, temporary installations, and other services.

The Fire and Security Association (FSA) consists of members of ECA and ECA's Scottish counterpart, SELECT.

With the charity Electrical Safety First, ECA owns Certsure LLP, which trades under certification brand NICEIC.

With Unite the Union (which includes members of the former Electrical, Electronic, Telecommunications and Plumbing Union), ECA is a founder and partner in the Joint Industry Board (JIB), which oversees wage negotiations in the industry. JIB also runs the Electrotechnical Certification Scheme (ECS), which administers site cards for individuals.

== Functions ==
ECA has three main aims:

- To provide support services to its Members. These include advice on: technical issues, employment, health and safety, contracts, legal, energy solutions and skills.
- To work with regulatory bodies, government and other opinion formers to build an efficient and sustainable industry, based on high standards of training and practice.
- To form strategic relationships with those who specify electrical and other engineering services to enhance the profile and promote the use of Members of all sizes.

It represents the views of specialist electrical and other engineering companies within contractor group Build UK and via Actuate UK. It holds a range of electrical industry conferences and other events, including the ECA Industry Awards and ECA Edmundson Apprentice of the Year Award annually.

=== Publications ===
ECA provides industry-related news and editorial content.

In addition to extensive free material for its Members, ECA also provides free checklists for commercial clients on selected topics, such as low carbon energy.

== Location ==
ECA moved from its previously long established HQ in Bayswater, West London, via temporary premises in Hammersmith, to newly joint-owned offices in an 'industry hub' in St Katharine Docks, near London's Tower Bridge on 6 November 2017. Other bodies based in the hub include BEAMA, BESA (joint premises owner), Electrical Industries Charity, Electrical Distributors' Association and Voltimum.

=== ECA operates nationally and in these regions ===
- Central South
- East
- East Midlands
- Greater London
- North East
- North West
- Northern Ireland
- South Wales
- West Midlands
- South East
- West
- South West

== See also ==
- International Electrotechnical Commission
- British Approvals Service for Cables
