= Building Engineering Services Association =

UK trade association for building engineering services

Building Engineering Services Association (formerly the HVCA)
- Abbreviation: BESA
- Formation: 1904
- Type: Trade association
- Legal status: Non-profit company
- Purpose: Building engineering services industry representation
- Headquarters: Rotherwick House, 3 Thomas More St, London E1W 1YZ
- Region served: United Kingdom
- Members: UK building engineering services companies
- Chief Executive: David Frise
- Affiliations: GCP Europe
- Website: www.thebesa.com

The Building Engineering Services Association (BESA), until 2012 the Heating and Ventilating Contractors' Association, and from then until 2016, B&ES, is the main UK trade association for companies that design, install, commission and maintain heating, ventilation, air conditioning, refrigeration (HVACR) and related engineering projects.

== History ==
The association has undergone several name changes since it was initially founded in 1904. It was originally the National Association of Master Heating & Domestic Engineers and was intended to represent the commercial interests of engineering contractors rather than individual engineers, who, since 1897 had been able to join the Institution of Heating & Ventilating Engineers (today CIBSE). Following a series of industrial disputes with employers, the contractors' body was established in January 1904, and held its first official meeting in March, and its first council meeting on 14 June 1904. Fourteen founder members were joined by six further companies at that meeting.

In 1927 it was renamed the National Association of Heating, Ventilating & Domestic Engineering Employers, which was instrumental in helping create the first industry training scheme for heating and ventilation engineers at Borough Polytechnic, now London South Bank University, in 1947.

In 1963, the association became the Heating and Ventilating Contractors' Association. In 2012, it had almost 1400 company members throughout the UK.

It changed its name to the Building and Engineering Services Association (B&ES) on 1 March 2012. In January 2016, it amended its name slightly to the Building Engineering Services Association, dropping the ampersand from both its name and acronym (now BESA).

In September 2017, BESA announced it was restructuring its organisation with an increased focus on training, legal and commercial support. As a result, up to 12 staff were being consulted about redundancy.

Until November 2017, the BESA head office was in Hammersmith, West London. It moved to offices in an 'industry hub' in St Katharine Docks, near London's Tower Bridge on 6 November.

== Function and activities ==
As an employers' association, it negotiates benefits and conditions for employees in the sector in a National Agreement with Unite the Union.

The BESA provides quality assurance services, promotes excellence and seeks to shape the commercial environment in which its members operate through representation and leadership; it has submitted written evidence to the UK Parliament on matters including industry training and university skills provision, health and safety, and energy and climate change.

It provides technical support services tailored to particular industry specialisms, which include: standards for ductwork (e.g. DSP DW/144, first published in 1997, and cited in Building Regulations) and ductwork cleaning (e.g. B&ES TR/19), heating and plumbing services, refrigeration and air conditioning, and service and facilities.

Its members are subject to regular, third-party inspection and assessment to ensure technical and commercial competence. In June 2025, it suspended 14 member firms for failing to meet standards; a further five were suspended in January 2026.

== Industry role ==
The BESA was a member of the Specialist Engineering Contractors Group, which was represented on the Strategic Forum for Construction; in 2021, the SEC Group was superseded by an alliance of engineering services organisations, Actuate UK, with BESA a founder member. BESA also represents the views of its members as a trade association member of Build UK.

Internationally, the BESA is a member of GCP Europe, the European umbrella body for the HVACR and plumbing sectors, and of CEETB (European Technical Contractors Committee for the Construction Industry), which represents all engineering specialists across Europe's construction sector.

== Subsidiary companies ==
The BESA has a number of subsidiary businesses which provide benefits and services to their members and businesses. These include:

- Welplan Ltd., a pension and employee benefit administrator
- Engineering Services Skillcard Ltd., which issues smart cards certifying the competence levels of individuals
- REFCOM Ltd., a registration scheme for companies working with F-Gas refrigerants as regulated by the F-gas Regulation (EC) No 842/2006
- SFG20, issued by BESA Publications, an online database of building maintenance standards and schedules initially created in 1990, and
- BESA Academy, a training organisation formerly branded as BESA Training, and prior to that, BEST.
