= Gas Safe Register =

UK natural gas engineer registration organisation

- Predecessor: CORGI
- Formation: 2009
- Purpose: Accreditation for gas installation work
- Location: PO Box 6804, Basingstoke, Hampshire, RG24 4NB
- Region served: UK
- Members: Gas engineers
- CEO: Jonathan Samuel
- Website: Gas Safe Register

Gas Safe Register is the official gas registration body for the United Kingdom, Isle of Man and Guernsey, appointed by the relevant Health and Safety Authority for each area. By law all gas engineers must be on the Gas Safe Register.

Gas Safe Register replaced CORGI as the gas registration body in Great Britain and Isle of Man on 1 April 2009 and Northern Ireland and Guernsey on 1 April 2010.

The purpose of the Gas Safe Register is to protect the public from unsafe gas work. It does this in two main ways, operation of the Register itself e.g. ensuring that the list of competent and qualified engineers is accurate and up-to-date, inspecting the work of Gas Safe registered engineers and investigating reports of illegal gas work. The second area is to conduct public awareness campaigns to raise awareness of gas safety issues.

== The change from CORGI to Gas Safe Register ==
A 2006 review by the Health and Safety Executive identified ‘a case for change’ to the CORGI scheme that had been registering gas installers since 1991. In a competitive tender, Capita was appointed to overhaul the scheme and operate it for 10 years from April 2009 to March 2019, and this was renewed in 2018 to cover the five year period from April 2019 to March 2024.

== Becoming Gas Safe Registered ==
Before applying to register engineers will need relevant qualifications and evidence of competence. Once an engineer has gained the relevant qualifications and the required evidence, this information will be passed to Gas Safe Register. At present, Gas Safe Register only accepts the ACS, NVQ or SVQ qualifications. Every Gas Safe registered business renews their registration on an annual basis, and updates their qualifications every 5 years.

== Governance and regulation ==
The scheme is administered by Capita Group on behalf of the Health and Safety Executive. in the United Kingdom Mainland and for the Health and Safety Executive Northern Ireland. The contract differs in Northern Ireland in relation to the main contract for mainland of the United Kingdom.

Gas Safe Register deals with all aspects of the downstream gas industry covered by the following regulations:

- Great Britain: The Gas Safety (Installation and Use) Regulations 1998
- Isle of Man: The Gas Safety (Installation and Use) Regulations 1994 as amended and applied by the Gas Safety (Application) Order 1996
- Northern Ireland: The Gas Safety (Installation & Use) Regulations (Northern Ireland) 2004
- Guernsey: The Health and Safety (Gas) (Guernsey) Ordinance, 2006

The regulations cover both piped natural gas and liquefied petroleum gas (LPG).

== Gas Safety Week ==
In 2011 Gas Safe Register launched a consumer awareness initiative called Gas Safety Week, with the aim of focusing the public's attention on gas safety issues and helping raise awareness of the dangers of carbon monoxide poisoning. Since 2011, the campaign has grown significantly and has become an industry-wide initiative supported by the large energy providers, retailers, charities and Gas Safe registered engineers.

== See also ==
- Landlord's gas safety certificate
- NICEIC
