= DB Engineering & Consulting =

Company of Deutsche Bahn

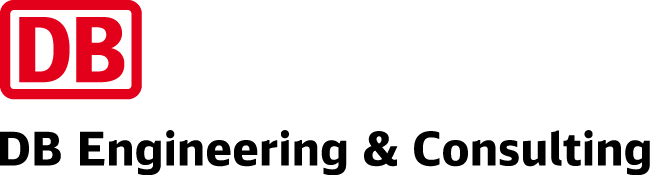
- Headquarters: Berlin, Germany
- Number of employees: 6,200 (2024)
- Parent: Deutsche Bahn
- Website: www.db-engineering-consulting.com

DB Engineering & Consulting (DB E&C) is an international engineering and consulting company of Deutsche Bahn that specialises in consulting, planning, and implementation services for infrastructure and mobility projects in Germany and worldwide. DB Engineering & Consulting was created in Germany at the beginning of April 2016 as a result of the merger of two DB subsidiaries, DB International and DB ProjektBau.

== History ==
DB Engineering & Consulting (DB E&C) originated from the establishment of Deutsche Eisenbahn-Consulting in 1966. Originally an independent entity, it became fully owned by Deutsche Bahn in 2002.

In 2003, Deutsche Eisenbahn-Consulting became a 100% subsidiary of DB ProjektBau, a newly formed DB company.

By 2007–2008, Deutsche Eisenbahn-Consulting underwent rebranding as DB International. Operating independently within the DB Group, DB International focused on client business in domestic and international markets, while DB ProjektBau concentrated on domestic projects.

In 2016, DB ProjektBau and DB International merged, forming DB Engineering & Consulting. In the same year, DB E&C expanded its services by acquiring DB Umweltservice (formerly Bahn-Umwelt-Zentrum), expanding its range of services to include environmental analyses.

In 2017, DB E&C established the DB Rail Academy product division and started offering international vocational training and professional development for the transport sector.

The following year, DB Engineering & Consulting acquired infraView. DB Engineering & Consulting, DB International Operations, and infraView were merged under the DB E.C.O. Group in 2019.

In 2020–2021, DB Engineering & Consulting acquired engineering and software developer ESE GmbH and acquired shares in inno2grid.

== Activities ==
The company is focused on six main areas: design, construction supervision, consulting for mobility and logistics services and digitalisation, project management, validation and assessment, and environmental and geoservices.

The company employs around 6200 people in 2024 and is headquartered at the EUREF Campus in Berlin-Schöneberg. DB E&C has many locations in Germany and offices worldwide.

Since 2019, the company has been part of DB E.C.O. Group, in which the companies DB International Operations, infraView, ESE Engineering und Software-Entwicklung, inno2grid and DB E.C.O. North America, as well as local companies, subsidiaries and investments worldwide, have been bundled alongside DB E&C.

The company is certified in accordance with DIN EN ISO 9001 and DIN EN ISO 45001 by DEKRA. It is a member of UIC, UITP, VDEI, VDV, DVWG and other national and international specialist and trade associations; also registered with international financing institutions.

== Projects ==
=== Near/Middle East ===
==== Etihad Rail DB Operations, UAE ====
In 2006, DB was commissioned to carry out a feasibility study for a rail network in the UAE. DB (and since 2016, DB E&C) supported the rail infrastructure development in a joint venture, Etihad Rail DB, and advised on-site. The key focus was implementing and monitoring test operations on the built and equipped lines and their transfer to regular operations.

==== Haramain high-speed rail project, KSA ====
The Haramain High Speed Railway project is designed to connect the cities of Mecca, Jeddah, and Medina with a high-speed passenger transportation line. DB E&C is responsible for planning, construction supervision, and vehicle procurement in this project. The project comprises a new electrified passenger railway line of 449 km in length with a commercial operating speed of 300 km/h. It establishes five stations, one in each of the major cities of Mecca, Madinah, Jeddah and King Abdullah Economic City (KAEC), in addition to King Abdullah bin Abdulaziz Airport. In the city of Makkah and Madinah the stations are based on the principles of the terminus while in Jeddah and KAEC the stations are based on the principles of through stations.

DB has also agreed to continue advising the railroad companies in the first year after the start of operations. DB E&C is also involved in a number of metro construction projects.

==== Israel Railways Electrification Program ====
DB Engineering & Consulting is actively involved in Israel Railways' electrification program, providing technical and management consultancy, engineering, and training tasks. The program aims to electrify 420 km of double track lines, including various infrastructure upgrades such as transformer substations, SCADA operation centers, communication systems, and signaling system alterations. DB E&C's role includes providing technical expertise for tender preparation and evaluation, reviewing technical documentation, developing rules and procedures for electrified operation, and assisting in recruitment and training of new employees. Additionally, DB E&C collaborates with Israeli engineers to address technical and safety challenges and ensure the program's outcome.

==== Tel Aviv Red Line, Israel ====
DB E&C worked on the Tel Aviv Red Line project, focusing on system integration, interface and requirements management, system assurance, testing, and acceptance. This light rail transit system is the first of four lines in the Tel Aviv-Yafo metropolitan area, extending from Bat Yam in the south to Petah Tikva in the northeast, with a significant underground portion. DB E&C served as the internal and external system integrator for the entire Red Line project, collaborating with various stakeholders.

==== Doha Metro, Qatar ====
DB E&C worked on the development and construction of the Doha Metro in Qatar. It provided technical and project management expertise for the design, tender process, and final implementation of the metro system, including its various phases and operational lines. Additionally, DB E&C supported the establishment of a Railway Safety Regulatory Body to ensure the safe operation of the Doha Metro network and other railway operators in Qatar.

==== Al Mashaaer Al Mugadassah Metro, Mecca, Saudi Arabia ====
DB Engineering & Consulting provided construction, operation, and maintenance supervision for a rail-based mass transit system in Mecca, Saudi Arabia, aimed at improving transportation for millions of pilgrims during the annual Hajj. Constructed by China Railway Construction Corporation (CRCC) in 21 months, the system connects holy sites like Jamarat, Mina, Muzdalifah and Arafat. Phase 1 commenced in November 2010, followed by Phase 2 a year later, with a capacity for approximately 400,000 pilgrims.

=== Australia ===
==== Sydney Metro ====
DB E&C provides a large part of the planning services in the areas of equipment technology, vehicles, acceptance/commissioning, and operation for the construction and launch of the fully automated Sydney Metro. The first section of the Sydney Metro City & Southwest between Rouse Hill and Chatswood opened in May 2019. A second section to Bankstown is scheduled to open in 2025.

=== Asia ===
==== Eastern Dedicated Rail Freight Corridor, India ====
DB E&C was commissioned as the project management consultant (PMC) for the construction of a single-track electrified heavy haul railway track for the Pilkhani - Sahnewal section of the Eastern Dedicated Freight Corridor. This section is part of the larger initiative by the Dedicated Freight Corridor Corporation of India Limited (DFCCIL) to establish dedicated freight corridors across India. The PMC's responsibilities include monitoring contractor progress, liaising with DFCCIL staff, and ensuring safety compliance during construction near busy railroad tracks and public utilities.

=== Germany ===
==== Stuttgart-Ulm rail project ====
DB E&C and its responsible project company are involved in the Stuttgart 21 project and the new Wendlingen-Ulm line, where they are working on behalf of DB Netz. Among other things, DB E&C is responsible for geodetic services, overall planning and planning approval for the dismantling of the old Stuttgart Hauptbahnhof, and construction supervision of the entire project. The company is also responsible for the planning and contract award supervision of the Stuttgart Digital Node, which is based on Stuttgart 21.

==== Gateway Gardens district, Frankfurt am Main ====
The new S-Bahn connection includes both the construction of the new Gateway Gardens station and the laying of the S-Bahn tracks between Frankfurt Stadion and the Frankfurt Airport regional station. Route 3683 (Flughafenschleife), between Frankfurt Stadion and Frankfurt Airport, was relocated to the East. For this purpose, a four-kilometer-long new double-track section was constructed. 50 per cent of this line is underground and was built using an open construction method. The new track construction was divided into 16 construction stages. The decommissioning and recultivation of the old existing line between the eastern portal of the existing airport tunnel and the stadium connection was also part of the project. In addition, safety standards in the existing airport tunnel were adopted. The line was put into commercial operation on December 15, 2019.

For this project, DB Engineering & Consulting was commissioned to provide design services to connect the DB line running between Frankfurt Stadion and Frankfurt Airport long-distance station to an underground suburban train station in Gateway Gardens, as well as to provide construction management services.

==== Hanover Central Station, Lower Saxony ====
DB E&C is involved in the conversion and extension of Hannover Hauptbahnhof to meet urban development requirements and increased traffic volume. It is also one of the first major Building Information Modeling (BIM) projects for DB. The project encompasses renewing 59 civil engineering structures affecting six platforms, including platforms, roofs, drainage, conveyor technology, technical equipment, and structural engineering elements. Additionally, access to the bridge is provided as part of the maintenance concept.

==== ICE depot in Cologne-Nippes ====
DB E&C oversaw the construction of the ICE depot in Nippes, Cologne, which commenced operation in June 2018. The depot services all ICE series from ICE 1 to ICE 4, with a workshop featuring four 410-meter-long tracks capable of accommodating double-traction trains. Additionally, ancillary facilities such as exterior cleaning and de-icing, underfloor lathe, and interior cleaning facilities were included. Throughout construction, operational continuity of adjacent tracks was maintained, necessitating track relocation and the dismantling of existing structures.

==== Karlsruhe-Basel ====
DB Engineering & Consulting contributed planning, construction supervision, realisation management, and consulting services to the Expansion/New-Built Line Karlsruhe-Basel project. National and international rail traffic between Rotterdam and Genoa relies on this line, which underwent upgrades to increase capacity and shorten travel times. Divided into nine sections covering 182 km, the project aimed to segregate traffic and boost speeds to 250 km/h. DB E&C's activities encompassed planning, construction supervision, implementation management, environmental investigations, and support for inspection and acceptance procedures.

==== Upper Elbe valley, Saxony ====
DB E&C provided project control and planning services for the multilayered construction site in Upper Elbe valley, Saxony. This project aimed to modernize the heavily used line between Dresden and Schöna/international border (D/CZ) to ensure its future availability. DB E&C's services included technical and commercial project management, design, and ecological construction supervision. Works involved renewing the permanent way, replacing culverts and railroad overpasses, and upgrading switches at various stations along the line. These projects were implemented between 2016 and 2020, with further developments in 2022.

==== Riedbahn Corridor Project ====
DB Engineering & Consulting is involved in Deutsche Bahn's modernization efforts for the German rail network. DB E&C focused on design, construction supervision, environmental services, and validation and assessment. For example, DB E&C conducts drone flights and 360° video recordings to facilitate detailed area surveys and construction supervision. One significant project includes the extensive modernisation of the Riedbahn, a 70-kilometre line between Frankfurt and Mannheim, which aims to enhance infrastructure and increase flexibility in rail transport.
