= Edinburgh College =

Scottish further education institution

- Former names: Jewel and Esk College; Stevenson College; Telford College
- Type: Further
- Established: 1 October 2012
- Endowment: £909,000 (2014/15)
- Budget: £91 million (2014/15)
- Chairman: Ian McKay
- Principal: Audrey Cumberford
- Academic staff: 594 (2014/15)
- Administrative staff: 582 (2014/15)
- Students: 29,427 (2013/14)
- Undergraduates: 5,444 (2013/14)
- Location: Edinburgh, Scotland; 55°58′38.25″N 3°14′41.62″W
- Campus: Edinburgh College (Midlothian Campus), 46 Dalhousie Road, Dalkeith, Midlothian EH22 3FR; Edinburgh College (Granton Campus), 350 West Granton Road, Edinburgh EH5 1QE; Edinburgh College (Milton Road Campus), 24 Milton Road East, Edinburgh EH15 2PP; Edinburgh College (Sighthill Campus), Bankhead Avenue, Edinburgh EH11 4DE
- Website: www.edinburghcollege.ac.uk

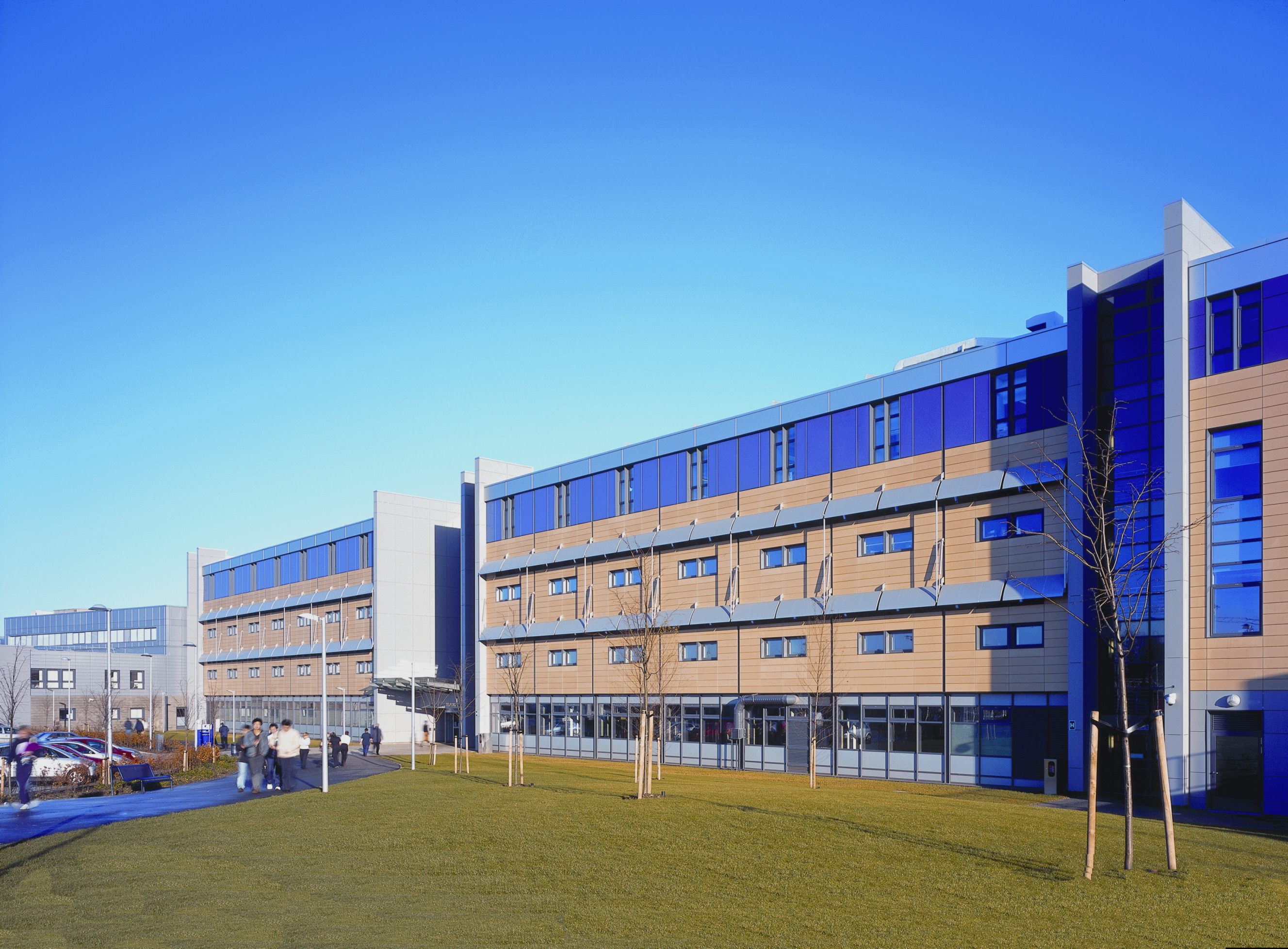
The college's Granton Campus in north Edinburgh

Edinburgh College is a further and higher education institution with campuses in Edinburgh and Midlothian, Scotland. It serves the Edinburgh Region, Edinburgh, East Lothian and Midlothian, and is the largest college in Scotland. It was formed on 1 October 2012 as part of the merger of Edinburgh's Jewel and Esk, Telford, and Stevenson colleges. The college has four campuses, all of which were previously the campuses of the constituents of the merger: Jewel and Esk's College Milton Road (Jewel) Campus and Eskbank Campus (Now referred to as "Edinburgh College, Milton Road Campus" and "Edinburgh College, Midlothian Campus"); Edinburgh Telford College (Now referred to as Edinburgh College, Granton Campus); and Stevenson College Edinburgh (Now referred to as Edinburgh College, Sighthill Campus)

== Formation ==
On 17 April 2012, Edinburgh's Jewel and Esk, Telford, and Stevenson colleges collectively submitted to the Scottish Government a business case for their merger into a single "Edinburgh" college. The case estimated that the merger would come at a cost of £14.7 million, of which £7.7 million would be provided by the Scottish Funding Council.

The case proposed job reductions across the periods 2012/13 to 2014/15, forecast to eventually provide savings of £9.47 million per year at a cost of 237 jobs. The jobs cut were 60% (49 jobs, £2.88 million) from managerial staff, 17.5% (96 jobs, £3.84 million) from teaching staff, and 17.5% (92 jobs, £2.75 million) from non-teaching staff. Severance costs as a result of job reductions were forecast at £10.47 million.

The case predicted that the merged colleges would have deficits of £0.47 million, £1.5 million, and £3.74 million in periods 2011/12, 2012/13, and 2013/14, respectively, before having a surplus of £0.44 million per period in the following three periods from 2014/15 to 2016/17.

The merger was approved by the Scottish Ministers, and came into force on 1 October 2012. The predicted income for period 2014/15 was not attained, and Edinburgh College reported a deficit of £5.14 million for that period. The income for 2016/17 was £3.0 million (including an actuarial gain on pension of £5.5 million).

== Funding ==
Edinburgh College is a primarily publicly funded college. Of the college's £91 million income for the period 2014/15, £68.35 million (75.1%) came from Scottish Funding Council (SFC) grants, £14.52 million came from tuition fees, and the remainder came from a mixture of contracts, endowments, and national and EU grants.

In 2010, the Office for National Statistics (ONS) reclassified, effective 1 April 2014, Colleges of Further Education in Scotland as central government entities, making them public bodies. This change meant that the SFC could claw back funds and, as a result, that colleges would be unable to hold large cash reserves. Following a Holyrood report placing Edinburgh College behind the City of Glasgow College in reforms, college principal Annette Bruton expressed discontent with this consequence of reclassification.

I think about £2.5m was asked for [from the SFC] and the college was able to get £300,000. [...] without being able to hold reserves it's difficult to see how the college can make that investment when they needed to for transformational change.

— Annette Bruton, Principal (Edinburgh College)

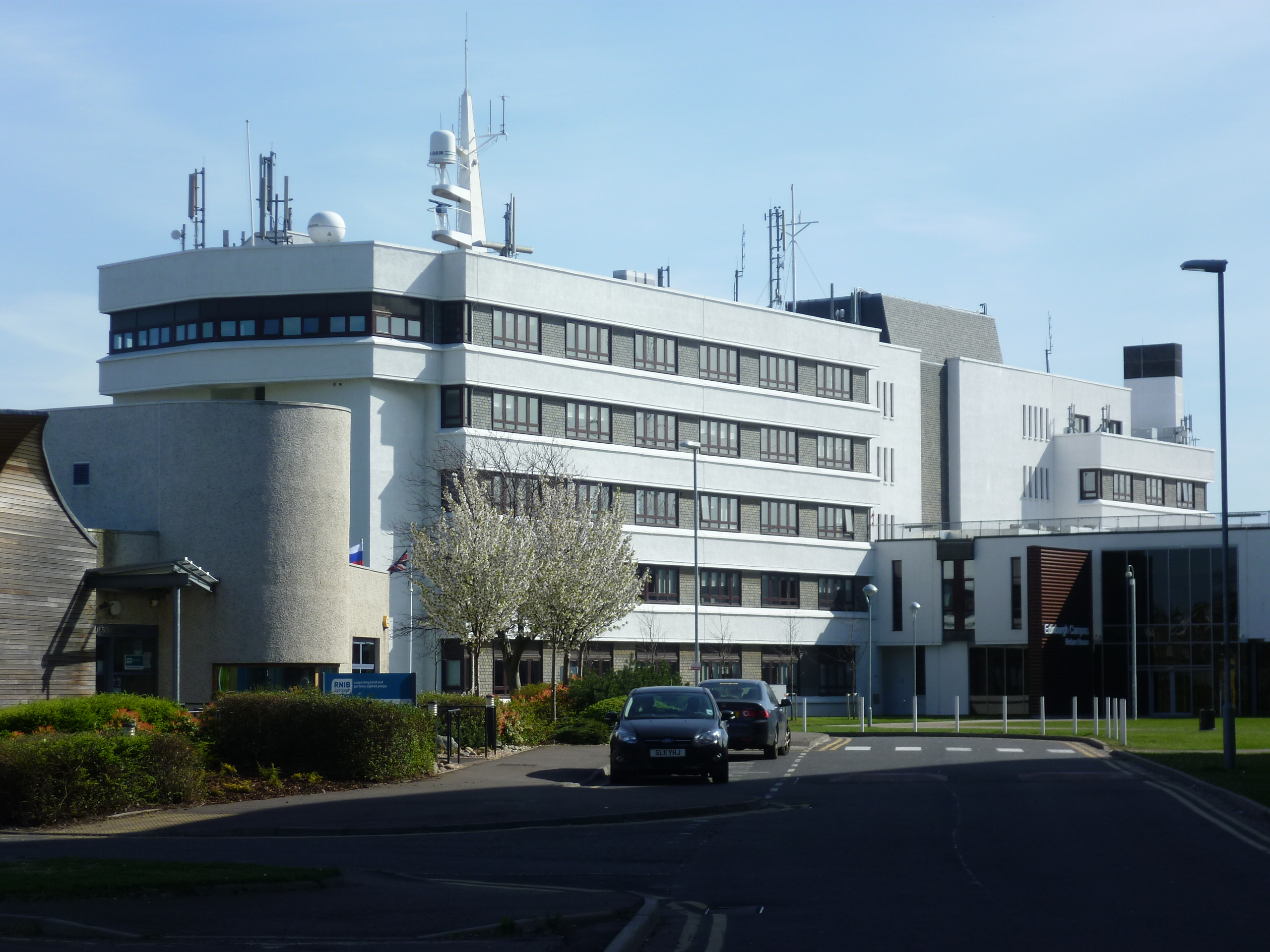
The college's Milton Road Campus in east Edinburgh

Edinburgh College is responsible for the funding of its students' association, ECSA. In 2014, the college's Board of Management provided ECSA with funds of £274,677.

== Curriculum Centres ==
Each of the courses offered by Edinburgh College falls under the remit of one of five curriculum centres. The centres are typically based at one to three of the college's campuses, and provide course-specific facilities. Courses are offered at SCQF levels 1 (National 1, formerly Access 1, units for early secondary education) through 11 (under- and postgraduate education and professional apprenticeships).

=== Creative Industries ===
The Creative Industries centre is based at the Milton Road and Sighthill campuses. The centre's facilities include film and music studios and auditoria. The centre partners with Creative Exchange Leith, an organisation providing incubation and office space rental, and funds the use of the Exchange's facilities by six student entrepreneurs each year.

The Creative Industries centre offers courses in art and design (graphic, interior, and interactive design), the performing arts, broadcasting, photography, sound engineering, computer science and software development, as well as various vendor qualifications such as Cisco CCNA and CompTIA A+ certifications.

=== Engineering+ ===
The Engineering+ centre is based at the college's Midlothian campus in Eskbank, near Dalkeith. The centre has a fleet of electric vehicles and charging points for those vehicles. Its facilities include various workshops and laboratories, and a field of 2,500 solar panels built by SSE which generates energy for the campus and which is used as an instructional aid. The centre also partners with MacTaggart Scott, a civil and defence engineering company, to provide training using an oil platform simulator and PLC laboratory.

The centre offers introductory engineering courses, welding courses, vehicle maintenance courses, as well as courses for qualifications in petroleum, mechanical, control, energy, electrical and electronic, and automotive engineering, plus courses in biology, chemistry, physics, and mathematics, a BESA-designed HVAC course, and various City and Guilds qualifications.

=== Health, Wellbeing and Social Sciences ===
The centre for Health, Wellbeing and Social Sciences is based at the Milton Road and Sighthill campuses. The Milton Road campus is equipped with a gym and spa (called "the Club"), and the Sighthill campus has a gym and sports centre.

The centre provides various courses for improving the fitness and health of the participants, as well as courses for qualifications in early childhood education, sports coaching, personal training, sports therapy, nursing, social care, dentistry, pharmacy, veterinary nursing, and social science.

=== Institute of Construction and Building Crafts ===
The Institute of Construction and Building Crafts provides instruction in various construction and trade skills. The institute is partnered with various companies and local authorities to provide apprenticeship training, including the CITB; the Scottish and Northern Ireland Plumbers' Association; and Building Engineering Services Training, a subsidiary of BESA. The institute's facilities include the Immersive and Controlled Training Environment (ICE), a virtual reality construction site simulator jointly developed by the college and Heriot-Watt University. The institute is based at the college's Granton campus.

The institute's courses include carpentry, joinery, painting and decorating, bricklaying, plastering, highway maintenance, roofing, stonemasonry, civil engineering, architecture, building surveying, as well as various industry accreditations including City and Guilds railway engineering; Gas Safe CCN1 (Core Domestic Natural Gas Safety), CKR1 (Domestic Cooking Appliances), HTR1 (Heating Appliances), and MET1 (Gas Meter Safety Assessment) qualifications; CENWAT (Central Heating and Hot Water) installation and maintenance training; CITB Construction Skills Certification Scheme (CSCS) training; various International Powered Access Federation qualifications; National Plant Operators Registration Scheme (NPORS) qualifications; and Prefabricated Access Suppliers' and Manufacturers' Association (PASMA) qualifications.

In the United Kingdom, the term "institute" is protected and cannot be used without the approval of the Secretary of State.

=== Hospitality, Travel and Tourism ===
The Hospitality, Travel and Tourism centre is based at the college's Milton Road and Granton campuses. It is part of the South East Scotland Academies Partnership's (SESAP) Hospitality and Tourism Academy, along with Queen Margaret University, West Lothian College, and Borders College. The centre's facilities include two training restaurants, the EH15 at Milton Road and the Apprentice at Granton, three training salons, two at Granton and one at Milton Road, and an aircraft cabin simulator. One of the salons is a component of a partnership with beauty product companies Elemis and Wella. Students on the courses offered by the centre work in the restaurants and salons as part of their study.

The centre's courses include barbering and hairdressing, beauty therapy, cheffing, events and retail management, various language courses including Gaelic and Gaelic history, French, German, Italian, and Spanish, plus industry qualifications including Chartered Institute of Linguists public service language interpretation, UK food hygiene certifications, and Prince's Trust introductory cookery courses.

== Honours ==
Queen's Park Shield

- Champions (1): 2019
