= Leith Nautical College =

Historic building in Edinburgh, Scotland

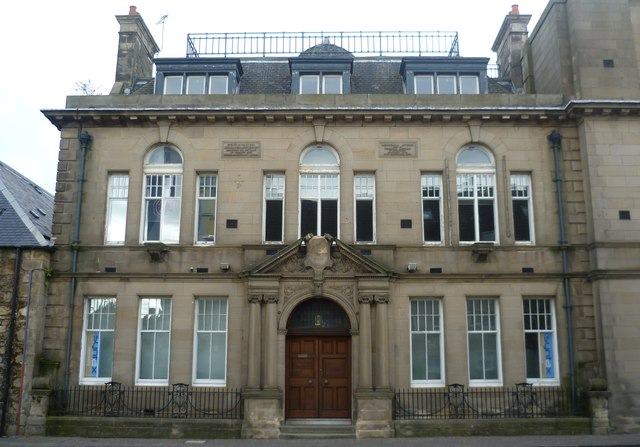
The former college building at 108 Commercial Street, Leith

Leith Nautical College was a maritime college in Leith, Scotland. The college provided instruction for the training of Merchant Navy officers and other seafarers. Courses offered included naval architecture, marine engineering, telegraphy, radar and marine electronics.

== History ==
In 1855, the college was established as the Leith Navigation School, after the passing of the Merchant Shipping Act 1854 that authorised the Board of Trade to allow training and examination of officers. The school was first located in the Mariner’s Church in Commercial Street. In 1903, the college was renamed as Leith Nautical College and moved into a new building at 108 Commercial Street (55.9777°N 3.1768°W) a short distance from the Mariner's Church. The new college was opened on 4 February 1903 by the Secretary for Scotland Lord Balfour of Burleigh. The 1903 building was extended in 1926 and 1931, and is Category B listed.

Marine engineering was first introduced as a course in the college in 1920. In 1927, a radio department was added to the college. In 1944, the college introduced training courses for the deck officers.

In the 1960s, a final extension to the college for marine engineering was added at 104/106 Commercial Street.

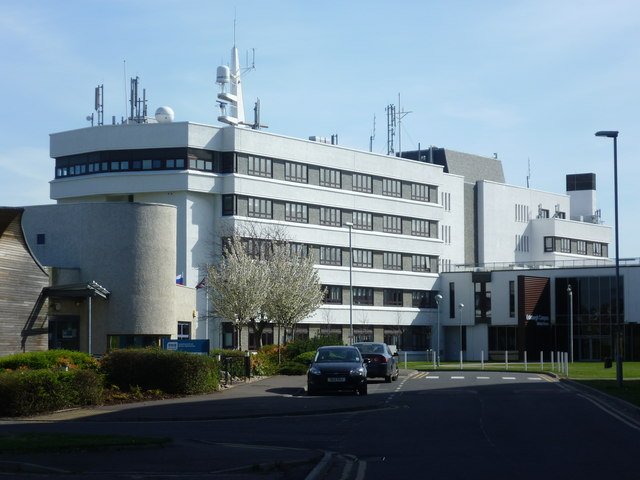
The former college building on Milton Road (designed to resemble a ship)

In 1974, the number of full time and part time students enrolled at the college reached 2,000. In 1978, the college moved to a new building on Milton Road in Portobello (55.9432°N 3.0968°W). Following a review by the Scottish Education Department and the Convention of Scottish Authorities, it was decided to close the college and instead move all maritime training to a single site in Glasgow. A campaign was raised in 1986 to prevent the closure of the college, but it was unsuccessful as Allan Stewart, Scottish Minister for Education ordered the college to end its teaching the following year. In 1987, the college was finally closed by the Scottish Education Department. The college site became part of the Jewel and Esk College, later renamed Edinburgh College. When the college closed, maritime education services were moved to the Glasgow College of Nautical Studies. The records and collections of the college are held at the Museum and Archive of Heriot Watt University.

== TS Dolphin ==
The college owned a training ship, the TS Dolphin. The training ship was in operation between 1944 and 1977. The ship was berthed at the West Old Dock.

The TS was originally launched in 1882 and before becoming a training ship was commissioned in the Royal Navy as HMS Dolphin.
