= Dayrut al-Sharif =

Dairut al-Sharif ديروط الشريف ⲧⲉⲣⲱⲧ ⲥⲁⲣⲁⲡⲁⲙⲱⲛ
- Town
- Location in Egypt
- Coordinates: 27°57′N 30°48′E
- Country: Egypt
- Governorate: Asyut
- Time zone: UTC+2 (EET)
  - Summer (DST): UTC+3 (EEST)

Dayrut al-Sharif (Arabic: ديروط الشريف "Dayrut the Noble", Coptic: ⲧⲉⲣⲱⲧ ⲥⲁⲣⲁⲡⲁⲙⲱⲛ Terōt Sarapamōn Coptic pronunciation: [təˈroːt sərəpaˈmoːn]) is a town in Egypt. It is located on the west bank of the Nile, in the Asyut Governorate. According to tradition, the Holy Family visited Dayrut al-Sharif on their flight into Egypt.

== History ==
The older name of the town is Dayrut Sarabam (Arabic: ديروط سربام) which comes from the Coptic name of the town which in turn comes from the personal name Sarapamun. The Monastery of Abba Sarapamon is still in the town.

== Climate ==
Köppen-Geiger climate classification system classifies its climate as hot desert (BWh).

Climate data for Dayrut al-Sharif
Month	Jan	Feb	Mar	Apr	May	Jun	Jul	Aug	Sep	Oct	Nov	Dec	Year
Mean daily maximum °C (°F)	21.2 (70.2)	23.3 (73.9)	26.6 (79.9)	31.6 (88.9)	34.7 (94.5)	35.6 (96.1)	35.5 (95.9)	35.1 (95.2)	32.6 (90.7)	31 (88)	26.8 (80.2)	22.3 (72.1)	29.7 (85.5)
Daily mean °C (°F)	12.4 (54.3)	14.2 (57.6)	17.2 (63.0)	21.9 (71.4)	25.6 (78.1)	27.1 (80.8)	27.5 (81.5)	27.4 (81.3)	25.3 (77.5)	23.2 (73.8)	18.6 (65.5)	14.3 (57.7)	21.2 (70.2)
Mean daily minimum °C (°F)	3.6 (38.5)	5.1 (41.2)	7.8 (46.0)	12.3 (54.1)	16.6 (61.9)	18.7 (65.7)	19.6 (67.3)	19.8 (67.6)	18.1 (64.6)	15.4 (59.7)	10.5 (50.9)	6.4 (43.5)	12.8 (55.1)
Average precipitation mm (inches)	0 (0)	1 (0.0)	1 (0.0)	0 (0)	0 (0)	0 (0)	0 (0)	0 (0)	0 (0)	0 (0)	0 (0)	1 (0.0)	3 (0)
Source: Climate-Data.org, altitude: 47m
