= Charley Says =

Series of British public information films

A scene from one of the short films

Charley Says is a series of six short cut-out animated public information films for children, made in 1973. They were produced by the British government's Central Office of Information and broadcast in the United Kingdom in the 1970s and 1980s.

== Overview ==
Most of the topics dealt with everyday safety issues children face, such as not going off with strangers or not playing with matches. They featured a little boy called Tony (voiced by the seven-year-old son of one of the neighbours of producer Richard Taylor) and his cat, named Charley, voiced by Kenny Everett, who would "miaow" the lesson of the episode, which the boy would then translate and explain. Often Charley served as the boy's conscience, similarly to Davey and Goliath or Jiminy Cricket of Walt Disney's film Pinocchio. When Charley and Tony did the right thing, they were rewarded with something for Tony and a fish for Charley, which he ate rapidly. However, on other occasions, Charley suffered the consequences of doing the wrong thing (e.g., in Charley's Tea Party he was scalded when he pulled a tablecloth and a teapot fell on him).

== Production details ==
The films were produced by Richard Taylor Cartoons which also produced Crystal Tipps and Alistair and the Protect and Survive series.

Six films were produced:

1. Charley – Falling in the Water
2. Charley – In The Kitchen
3. Charley – Matches
4. Charley – Mummy Should Know
5. Charley's Tea Party
6. Charley – Strangers

== References in popular culture ==
The electronic dance music group The Prodigy famously sampled the episode "Mummy Should Know" for their UK 1991 debut hit single "Charly", which reached number 3 in the UK Singles Chart. The sample was of Charley miaowing and Tony saying, "Charley says, 'always tell your mummy before you go off somewhere'".

In 2005, the Charley Says series was voted #95 on the Channel 4 TV special 100 Greatest Cartoons, and in 2006 was voted the UK's favourite public service advertisement by readers of the BBC News website.

In 2014, Electrical Safety First (formerly known as the Electrical Safety Council) launched a brand new Charley Says film. featuring the voice of award-winning comedian and actor David Walliams. This was created to promote staying electrically safe in the home and not overloading power sockets. A second film was also created, on the subject of the dangers of buying counterfeit electrical goods.

== Video release ==
The Charley Says films have been released in the UK (along with other public information films) as both a DVD-video and a two-volume set of VHS tapes.
