= Elsewedy Electric =

Egyptian multinational electrical company

Elsewedy Electric Co S.A.E. السويدى اليكتريك
- Type: Société Anonyme Égyptienne
- Traded as: EGX: SWDY
- Industry: Energy Solution Provider
- Founded: 1938
- Headquarters: Cairo, Egypt
- Area served: Worldwide
- Key people: Ahmed Elsewedy (President and CEO)
- Revenue: 4.8 Billion USD (2023)
- Net income: 238 million USD (2019)
- Number of employees: 18,000 (2020)
- Website: www.elsewedyelectric.com

Elsewedy Electric Co S.A.E. is an Egyptian multinational electrical company. It was founded in 1938 by the Elsewedy family.

The company manufactures and sells integrated energy products and services in seven energy segments: Electrical cables and accessories, electrical products, telecommunications, transformers, wind energy generation, energy measurement and management, engineering, procurement and contracting.

== History ==
In 1938, Elsewedy family started their business as a trader in electrical equipment.

From 1960–1995, the family changed the company from just trading in electrical equipment to being a distributor for the sole cable manufacturer in Egypt at that time (1960).During this period, it was focused on selling cables to the Egyptian market, until the Elsewedy family established the first private sector cable factory in Egypt (Arab Cables) in 1984. At that time, all other cable manufacturers in Egypt were solely owned by the Egyptian government.

The company was located in one of Egypt's industrial zones, 60 km east of Cairo with expressways linking it to Egypt's major Mediterranean and Red Sea ports. It was specialized in the manufacturing of: low, medium &high voltage power cables, control cables, and over head transmission lines.

In 1996, a second factory was built specializing in power cable manufacturing for export, Egytech. Egytech was awarded quality standards such as (ISO, KEMA, BASEC, CE, VDE, and SGS) and was capable of exporting products to Algeria, Angola, Bahrain, Chad, Cyprus, India, Iraq, Ireland, Italy, Jordan, Kazakhstan, Kenya, KSA, Kuwait, Libya, Mauritius, Nigeria, Qatar, Romania, Russia, Rwanda, Spain and South Africa.

To improve quality control ever the end product of the cables, the company established a factory of PVC compounds and Master Batch. In 1996, Sedplast was established to improve effectiveness and efficiency throughout the processes and systems of the company. Sedplast specialized in PVC compounds including soft and rigid PVC, as well as White master batch, Black master batch, Color master batch, and Additive master batch.

In 1997, the company established an industrial facility to meet tailored customer requirements, including domestic appliance cords, Category 7 ethernet cables; twisted pair telephone cables for home and business premises, and complex instrumentation cables needed to monitor natural resources. To complete the vertical integration, a joint venture was established between Elsewedy Cables and Elastimold, a unit of the cables accessories company Thomas & Betts. It was established to cover the markets in the MENA region for medium and high voltage joints and terminations.

In collaboration with Southwire, USA a continuous cast and rolled copper rod plant has been brought up in 1998 to have the largest plant through the Middle East and North Africa.

United Metals acquired Special High Grade Zinc with a purity of 99.995% according to ASTM B6. Another company was established in 1998 to increase the capacities of serving cables accessories, Elsewedy SEDCO, for the production of cable joints and terminations in Egypt through collaboration with international companies.

From 2002–2008, Ahmed Sadek Elsewedy, took the lead in the family business. Following its establishment in the Egyptian market. The company’s capital increased reach 8 million USD and new machinery was added to increase capacity to approximately 3,000 tons of aluminum conductors and 3,000 tons of copper conductors.

2003 was the year where the company began to diversify its specialty to more than cables, a transformers industrial facility to manufacture 6,000 units yearly.

In 2004, the company began through a joint venture with an Italian company called Italsmea. Since then, Italsmea Elsewedy was renamed Elsewedy SEDCO for Petroleum Services to supply electrical bulk materials and explosion-proof equipment for petroleum companies.

To serve the Levant markets, Elsewedy Cables set up an industrial facility for cables during 2005. In 2007, another factory was established for manufacturing transformers to cover Africa and the Middle East.

Since 2008, five additional cables facilities have been established in Algeria, Saudi Arabia, Ethiopia, Yemen, and Qatar. Two transformer manufacturing facilities have also been established in Zambia and Egypt. Elsewedy Transformers Egypt is one of the few factory that manufactures power transformers at operating voltages of up to 220 kV in the Middle East and Africa. The Egyptian company for Electrical Insulators was also fully acquired by Elsewedy Cables in 2008.

The company has also entered two new segments; electrical energy measurement and management, and wind energy generation. Elsewedy Cables acquired Iskraemeco in June 2008 a Slovenian manufacturer of energy measurement and management operating since 1945 with a manufacturing capacity reaching 3 million meters. The group entered the wind energy sector through the strategic acquisition of a Spanish wind turbine manufacturer MTorres Olvega Industrial and a joint venture agreement with the German windmill tower manufacturer Siag.

In 2010, Elsewedy Cables renamed itself Elsewedy Electric, to reflect the recent diversification of its portfolio of energy products and services.

Currently, Elsewedy Electric is listed as number 4 in Forbes' Top 50 Listed Companies in Egypt 2023.

In October 2024, the Iraq Development Fund announced that it had signed a memorandum of understanding with Elsewedy Electric in order to establish an investment fund for the purpose of investing in strategic projects and lessen reliance on oil.
