= Electrical Contractors' Association of Scotland =

Trade association

SELECT logo

SELECT, founded in 1900 as the Electrical Contractors' Association of Scotland, is the Scottish construction trade association for specialist businesses in the electrical industry.

With the Unite the Union, SELECT established the Scottish Electrical Charitable Training Trust (SECTT), a not-for-profit organisation concerned with training apprentices within the SJIB Apprenticeship Scheme, the only industry-approved training scheme for electrical contracting apprenticeships in Scotland. The SJIB (Scottish Joint Industry Board) was co-founded in 1969 by SELECT and Unite the Union, then known as AMICUS.

Along with the NICEIC, SELECT is authorised by the Scottish Government to assess and register electricians who are competent to carry out and certify electrical installation work in Scotland in compliance with UK Building Regulations. SELECT was the first Scheme Provider for the Certification of Construction (Electrical Installations to BS 7671).

In September 2010, SELECT established a Scottish Environmental Technologies Training Centre to provide training for electricians, heating engineers and plumbers in the latest developments in energy-saving technologies.

It was one of seven associations represented by the Specialist Engineering Contractors Group on the UK government's Strategic Forum for Construction; in 2021, the SEC Group was superseded by an alliance of engineering services organisations, Actuate UK, with SELECT a founder member.

== See also ==
- Electrical Contractors' Association - the equivalent association for contractors in England, Northern Ireland and Wales.
