= DB ProjektBau =

- Company type: GmbH
- Founded: January 1, 2003
- Defunct: December 31, 2015
- Fate: Merged with DB International to form DB Engineering & Consulting
- Headquarters: Berlin, Germany
- Key people: Jens Bergmann (Chair)
- Number of employees: ~4,400 (2013)
- Parent: Deutsche Bahn

DB ProjektBau GmbH was a German company that carried out and supported large-scale railway projects for Germany's national rail carrier, Deutsche Bahn (DB). It was created on 1 January 2003 as a subsidiary of DB. In 2016, it was merged with DB International to form DB Engineering & Consulting.
