= Jewel and Esk College =

Former further education college in Scotland

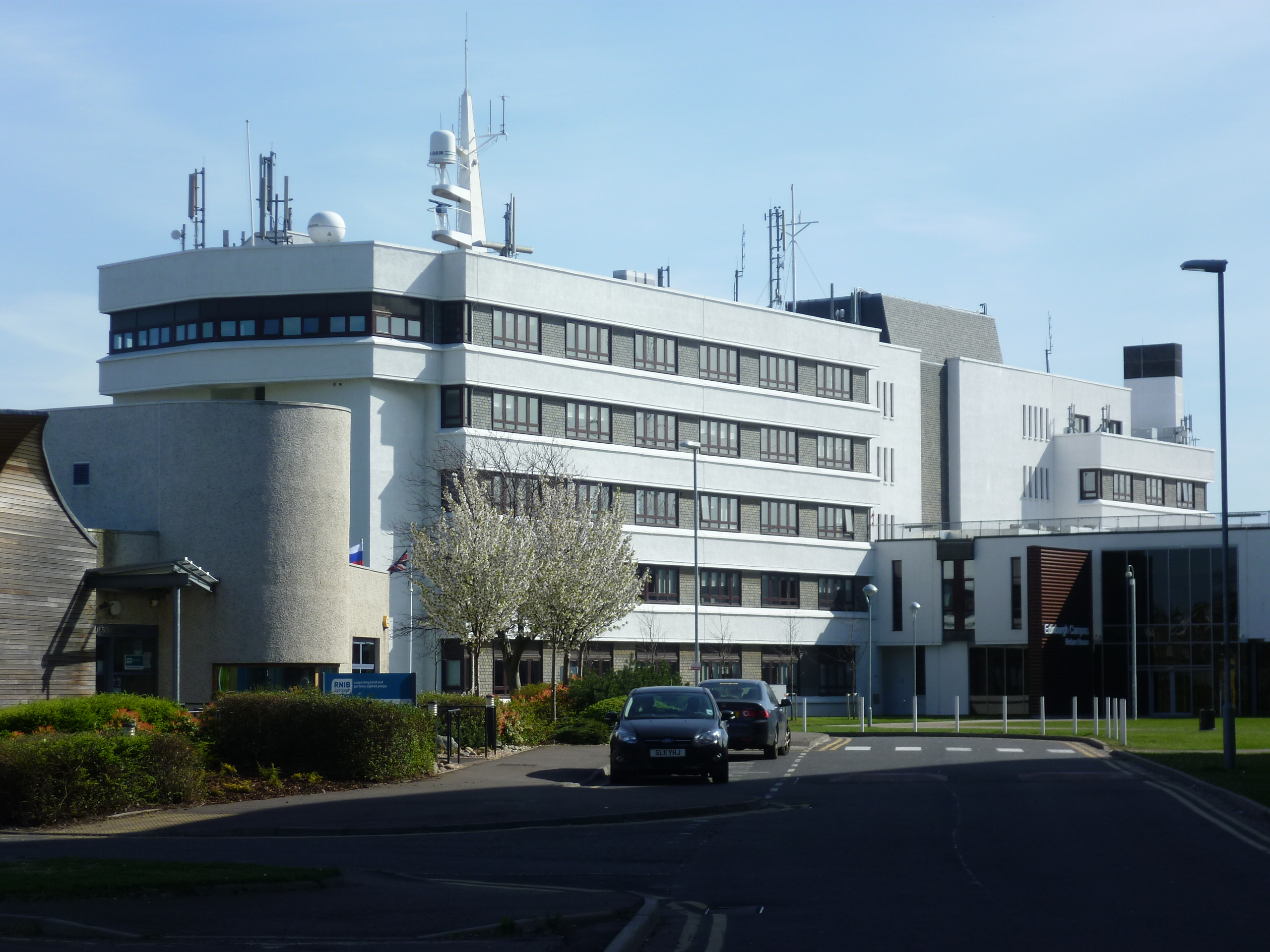
- Type: Further education
- Location: Edinburgh, Scotland; 55°56′35.1″N 3°5′50.08″W

Jewel and Esk College was a further education college in the Lothians in Scotland. It had two campuses, one located at Milton Road in Edinburgh and the other at Eskbank, Dalkeith, Midlothian.

In October 2012 the college merged with Edinburgh's other two FE colleges (Telford College and Stevenson College) to form a new entity called Edinburgh College. Jewel and Esk's campuses now form two of the four main sites of the new college.

== Students ==
The college catered for 7,000 students on a full/part-time and Open learning basis.

In 2006, Jewel & Esk College had nearly 8,000 students.

== History ==
Jewel and Esk Valley College was founded in 1903. Jewell and Esk Valley College was created in 1987 from the merger of Leith Nautical College (a former Central Institution) and Esk Valley College. The Jewel part of the name refers to a former coal-mining area in the college's catchment area.

== Campuses ==
The college campuses were remodelled between 2005 and 2008. In Dalkeith a new build replaced an older building (now demolished) across the road from the current site. The buildings and facilities at both locations are innovative and intended to introduce educational qualifications and skills.

Natural light flows through many of the spaces, highlighting the dynamic nature of the buildings and showcasing key areas of the college. In 2011, Jewel and Esk College had plans to install solar panels to generate electricity and to reduce their reliability on government funding.

== Midlothian Campus ==
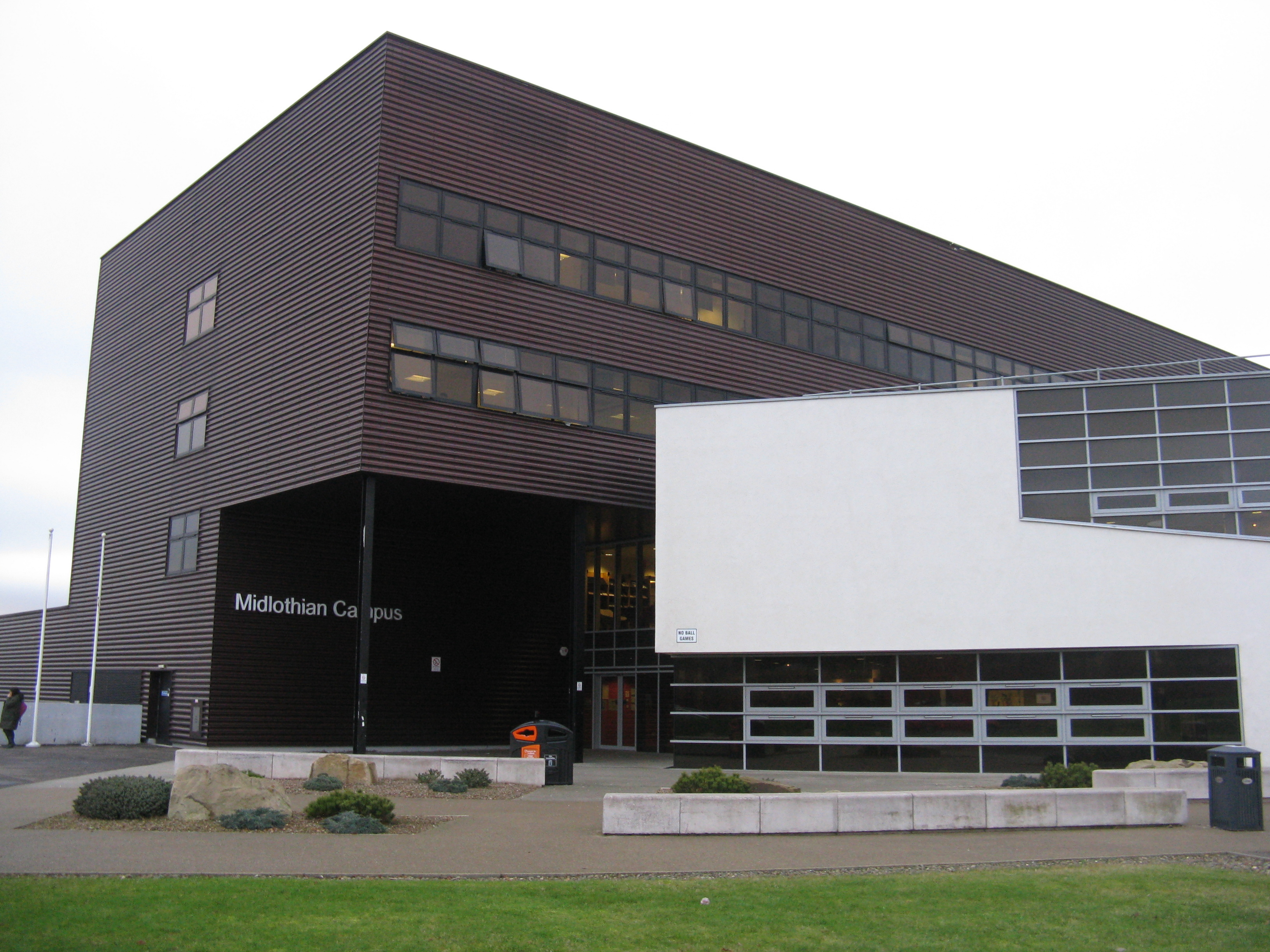
Midlothian campus

At Hardengreen, the new Midlothian Campus opened to students in 2008 as one of the most advanced technology teaching centres in Scotland, featuring an Oil Production Platform Simulator, specialist engineering and construction equipment, along with purpose-built plumbing and electrical workshops.
