= Landlord's gas safety certificate =

Legal requirement in United Kingdom for rental accommodation

A landlord’s gas safety certificate, also referred to as the landlord’s gas safety record, is a legal certificate required by law to be held for all rental accommodation in the United Kingdom where there are gas appliances present. The requirement is enshrined in the Gas Safety (Installation and Use) Regulations 1998 and supported by associated guidance on compliance with those regulations."Safety in the installation and use of gas systems and appliances" (PDF). Health and Safety Executive. The law requires that all gas appliances, flues and associated pipework in a rented property be checked at least once every twelve months,"Gas Safety (Installation and Use) Regulations 1998 SI 1998/2451". Government of the United Kingdom. with a gas safety record being completed and a copy provided to tenants within twenty-eight days of the inspection.Health and Safety Executive. "Landlords' responsibility for gas safety".

The definition of “rented” accommodation for the purposes of this requirement is broad and includes properties provided under contractual arrangements, such as employer-provided housing for domestic staff as well as general private rental housing."When and Where a CP12 Gas Safety Certificate is Required". cp12gascertificate.co.uk. Gas safety records, sometimes referred to as a CP12 (from the former CORGI Proforma 12), are completed by engineers who must be registered with the Gas Safe Register, the body responsible for gas safety registration in the UK since 2009."Mr Engineers changes to gas safety inspection and Gas Safety Certificate 2018". 11 April 2018.

Gas safety checks should cover all relevant gas-burning appliances and their associated parts, including boilers, ovens, pipework, flues and chimneys. These inspections ensure that appliances are functioning correctly, burning gas safely, have appropriate ventilation and adequate air supply, and that safety devices are operational. Once the inspection has been carried out and the certificate issued, the record will contain: • the name, Gas Safe ID number and signature of the registered engineer; • the date of the gas safety inspection; • the name and address of the landlord or letting agent; • the address of the inspected property; • information about each gas appliance and flue checked; • details of any identified faults and required remedial action; and • confirmation that the inspection complies with statutory requirements and the date of the next scheduled check (usually 12 months after the inspection).
