= Rail transport in the United Arab Emirates =

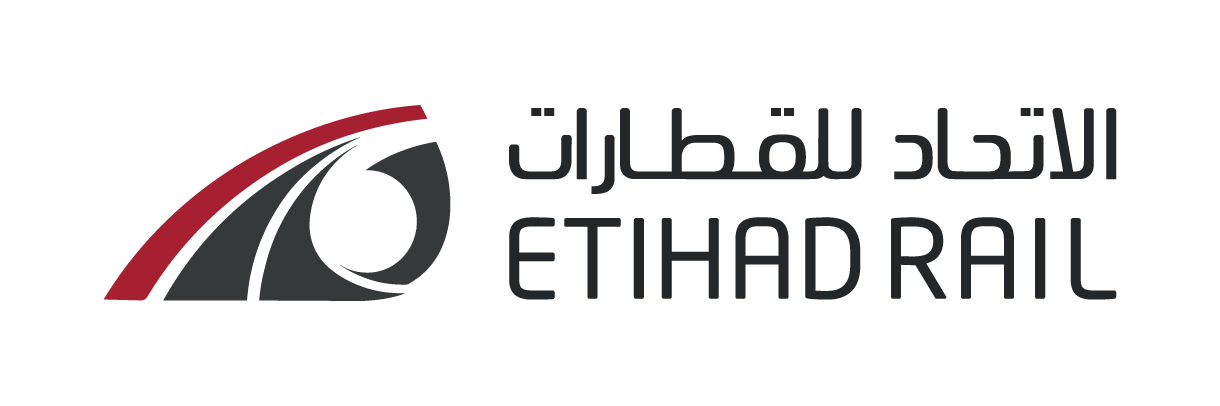

Operation
- National railway: Etihad Rail

Track gauge
- Main: 1,435 mm (4 ft 8+1/2 in) standard gauge

Features
Map
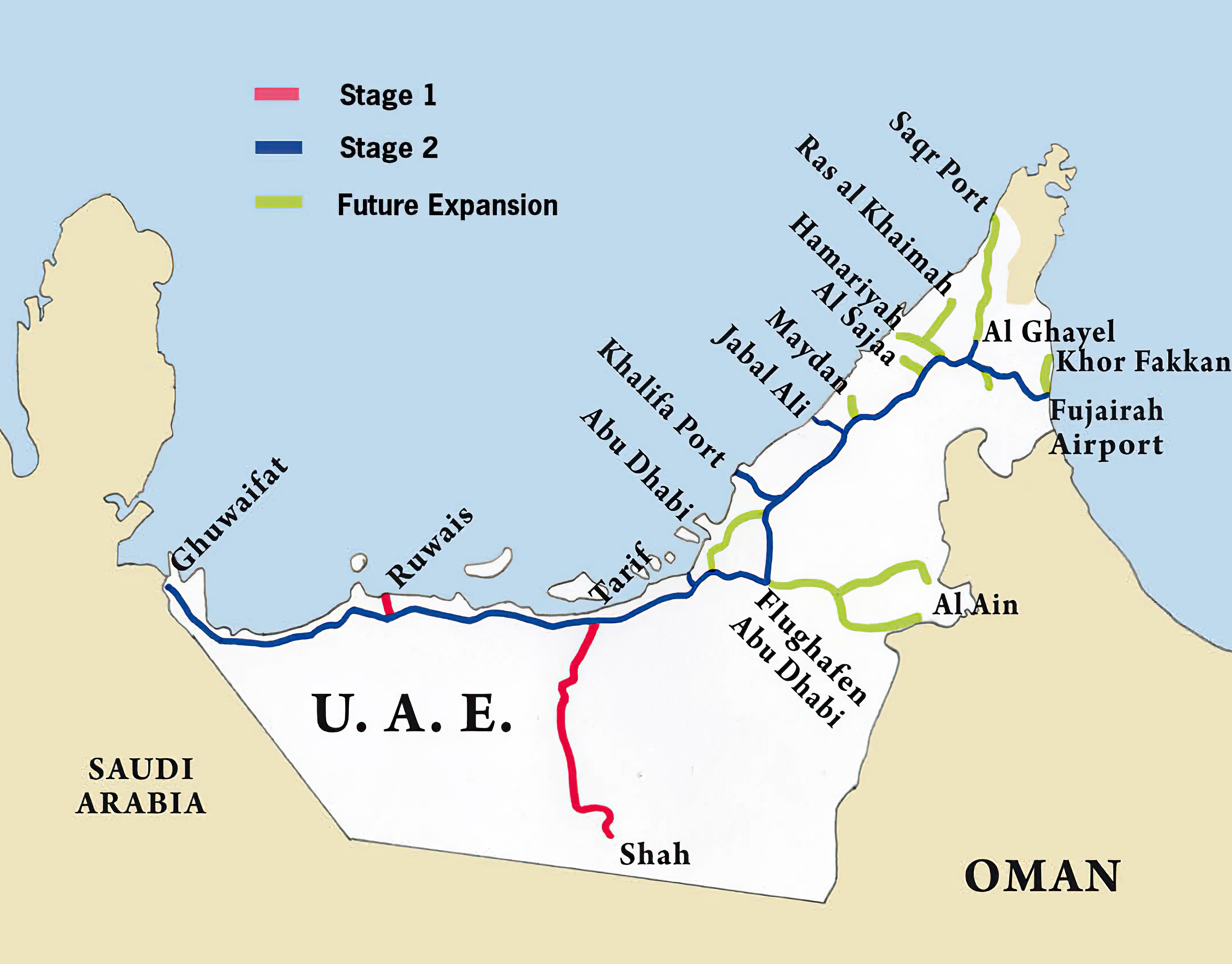
- Map of existing and planned railways in the United Arab Emirates

Rail transport in the United Arab Emirates is an expanding mode of public transport in the country. Etihad Rail is the national railway company, and is a state-owned company.

== Mainline ==
The United Arab Emirates' mainline railway network is owned and operated by Etihad Rail.

Etihad Rail will link the UAE to other GCC countries via the Gulf Railway.

On June 30th 2026, Etihad Rail began passenger railway services.

== Urban ==
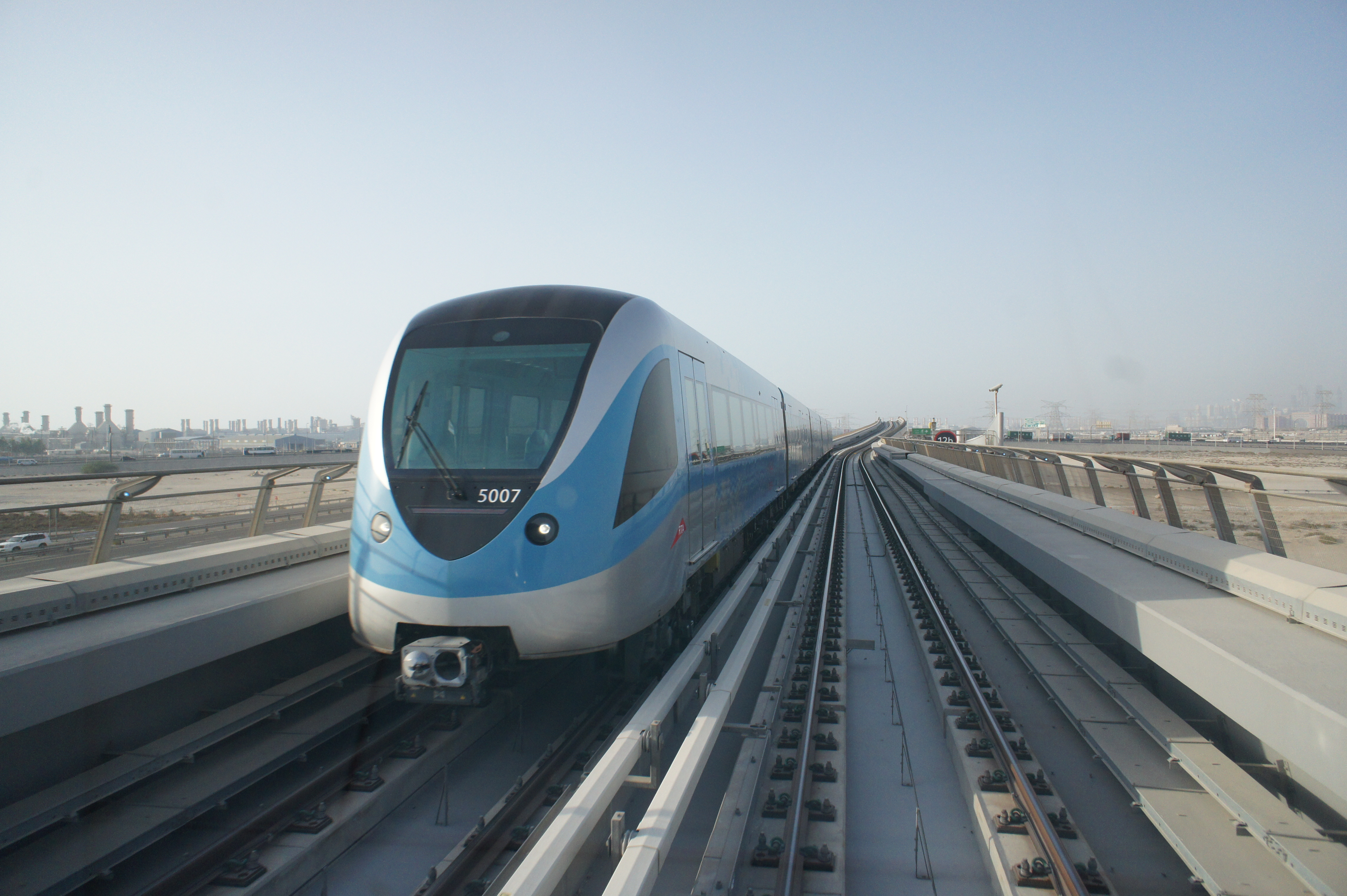
Dubai Metro

The following forms of urban rail transit exist:

- Dubai Metro
- Palm Jumeirah Monorail in Dubai
- Dubai Tram
- Dubai Trolley
- Dubai International Airport Automated People Mover

=== Under construction or proposed ===
- Abu Dhabi Metro
- Abu Dhabi tram
- Sharjah Metro
- Sharjah Tram
- Ajman Tram
- Dubai Rail Bus

== See also ==
- Etihad Rail
- Transport in the United Arab Emirates
