= Reportage Properties =

UAE real estate developer

- Type: Private
- Industry: Real estate, Property development
- Founded: 2014
- Headquarters: Abu Dhabi, United Arab Emirates
- Area served: United Arab Emirates; Egypt; Morocco; Turkiye; Belarus
- Key people: Aref Al Khoori (Chairman), Andrea Nucera (Managing Director and CEO)
- Revenue: ▲AED 2.3 billion (2022)
- Website: https://reportageuae.com/

Reportage Properties is an international real estate developer based in Abu Dhabi, United Arab Emirates. It provides investment, project management, residential construction, and development services, introducing the concept of townhouse with loft design for the first time in Abu Dhabi.

== Overview ==
Reportage Properties was established in 2014 in Abu Dhabi. The company has active offices in Dubai, Cairo, Istanbul, Riyadh, Minsk, and Moscow, implementing projects in the UAE, Egypt, Morocco, Turkiye, and Belarus. Since its establishment in 2014, Reportage has planned and designed over 11,000 residential units and several limited townhouse collections. The chairman of the board of Reportage Group is Aref Al Khoori. The CEO is Islam Hamdy.

== History ==
The first project of Reportage Properties was the Leonardo Residences in Masdar City, Abu Dhabi, handed over in 2018. 93% of all apartments were reserved within the first day after the official groundbreaking ceremony on 10 April 2016. Reportage Properties has achieved sales of more than AED 500 million since the beginning of 2021 compared to AED 165 million in the same period of 2020.

Sales during the first quarter of 2021 amounted to AED 369 million compared to AED 132 million during the first quarter of 2020, with a growth rate of 180%. 2020 the sales totaled AED 812 million, 125% more than in 2019. In 2020, Reportage Properties changed its brand and sold properties worth more than 754 million AED. In 2021, Reportage Properties started to build a new 5,500-unit residential complex, Montenapoleone, in Mostakbal City in New Cairo. This was their first project outside the UAE. That year, their sales rose to over 1.6 billion AED.

In 2022, Reportage Properties' sales reached 2.3 billion AED. In 2022, the company launched its second project outside the UAE, the Sylvana project, in the Bahçeşehir district of Istanbul, Turkiye. Reportage Properties received three awards at the Arabian Property Awards 2022-2023 in the Arab and African regions. Al Maryah Vista 2 won the Best Multi-Storey Residential Project and Best 5-Star Multi-Storey Residential Project awards. Al Raha Lofts won the Best Residential Project with More Than 20 Units award.

In 2023, Sylvana project won the award of “Best Townhouse Community” from European Property Awards. In April 2023, Reportage Properties and the Italian International School (IIS) Khalifa City launched its first Ramadan Festival.

== Projects ==
Reportage Properties have the following known projects:

- Al Marya Vista 1, 2
- Al Raha Lofts 1, 2
- Alexis Tower
- Diva Project
- Leonardo Residence
- Oasis Residence Project 1, 2
- Rukan Lofts
- Rukan Tower
- The Gate
- Plaza Project
- Montenapoleone
- Bianca Townhouses
- Verdana
