= Etihad Airways =

Flag carrier airline of the United Arab Emirates

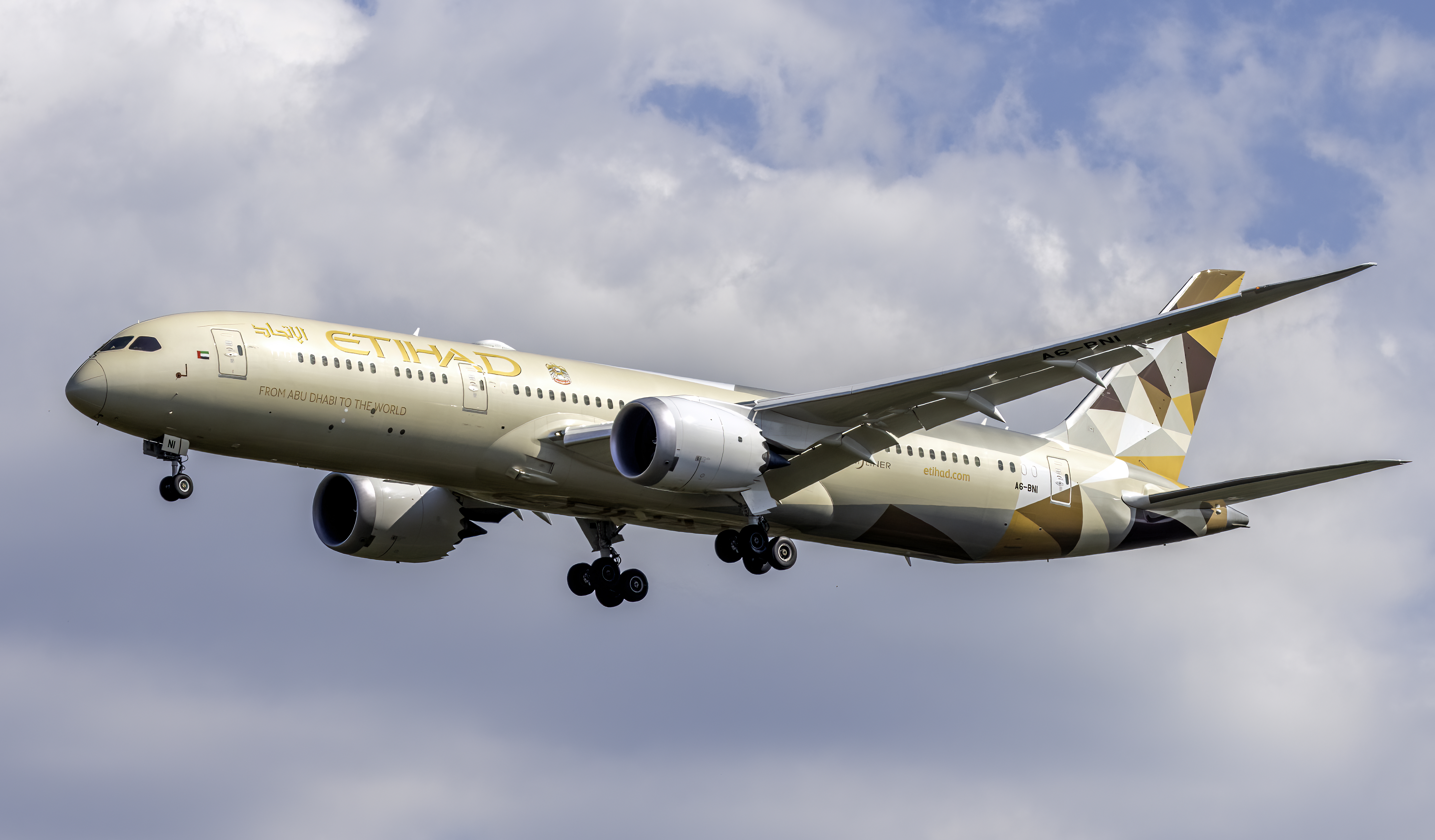
- An Etihad Airways Boeing 787-9 Dreamliner
IATA	ICAO	Call sign
EY	ETD	ETIHAD
- Founded: July 11, 2003; 23 years ago
- Commenced operations: November 5, 2003; 23 years ago
- Hubs: Zayed International Airport
- Frequent-flyer program: Etihad Guest; Etihad One Club
- Subsidiaries: Air Arabia Abu Dhabi (51%)
- Fleet size: 110
- Destinations: 120
- Parent company: Etihad Aviation Group
- Headquarters: Khalifa City, Abu Dhabi, UAE
- Key people: Mohamed Ali Al Shorafa (chairman); Antonoaldo Neves (CEO)
- Founder: Khalifa bin Zayed Al Nahyan
- Revenue: ▲US$6.8 billion (2025)
- Profit: ▲US$544 million(2025)
- Employees: 10,000+ (2025)
- Website: www.etihad.com

Etihad Airways (Note: Arabic: شركة الإتحاد للطيران, romanised: sharikat al-ittiḥād li-ṭ-ṭayarān) is one of the two flag carrier airlines of the United Arab Emirates (the other being Emirates). Its head office is in Khalifa City, Abu Dhabi, near Zayed International Airport. The airline commenced operations in November 2003 and is the second-largest airline in the UAE after Emirates.

The airline operates more than 1,000 flights per week, to over 120 passenger and cargo destinations in the Middle East, Africa, Europe, Asia, Australia, and North America, with a fleet of 107 Airbus and Boeing aircraft as of July 2025. Its main base is at Zayed International Airport. In addition to its main activity of passenger transportation, Etihad also operates Etihad Holidays and Etihad Cargo.

== History ==
=== Background ===
The emirate of Abu Dhabi was a joint owner of Gulf Air along with Bahrain, Qatar, and the Sultanate of Oman. Zayed International Airport was one of Gulf Air's bases and hubs from the 1970s until 2005, when the UAE withdrew from the airline. Gulf Air would remain as a two-state carrier until Oman's exit in 2007 to focus on Oman Air and today, Gulf Air is solely owned by Bahrain.

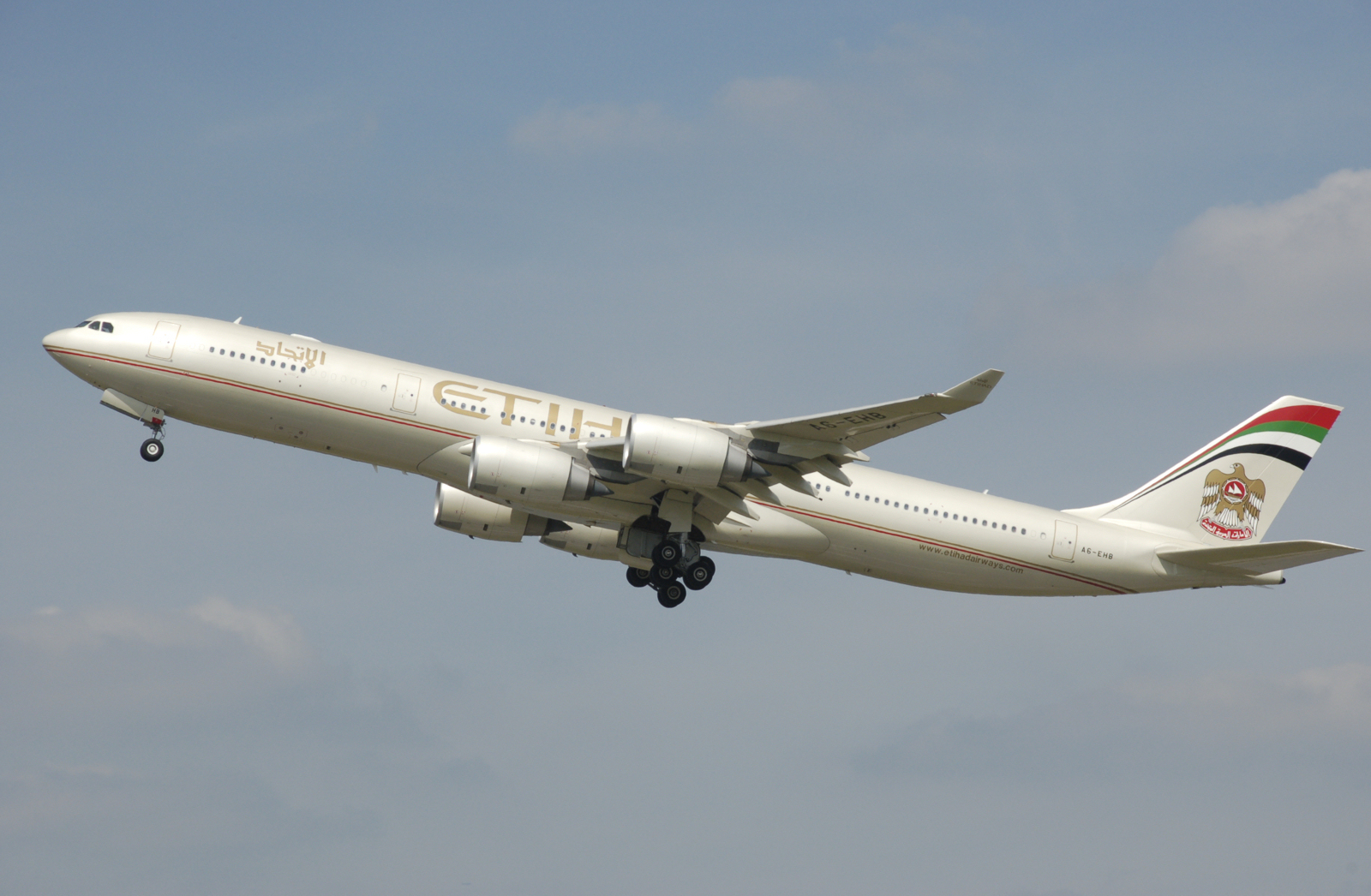
A now-retired Airbus A340-500 wearing the first livery (with the older UAE coat of arms)

=== Name ===
Etihad means "union" or "unity" in Arabic, and represents the unity of the seven emirates of the United Arab Emirates (Abu Dhabi, Dubai, Sharjah, Ajman, Umm Al Quwain, Ras Al Khaimah, and Fujairah).

=== Foundation ===
In July 2003, future UAE president Sheikh Khalifa bin Zayed Al Nahyan, who wanted an airline for Abu Dhabi, issued an Amiri decree that established Etihad Airways as a national airline of the United Arab Emirates. Sheikh Ahmed bin Saif Al Nahyan founded the airline and utilised AED500 million of start-up capital. Services were launched with a ceremonial flight to Al Ain on 5 November 2003. On 12 November 2003, Etihad commenced commercial operations by launching services to Beirut, Lebanon.

In June 2004, the airline placed a US$8 billion aircraft order for six Boeing 777-200 and 24 Airbus aircraft, including 10 Airbus A380s. Etihad's first A380 was delivered in December 2014.

In June 2008, at the Farnborough Airshow, the airline announced an order for 35 Boeing 787s and 10 777s, options for 25 787s and 10 777s, and purchase rights for 10 787s and 5 777s. Etihad reported its first full-year net profit in 2011, of US$14 million, in line with the strategic plan announced by CEO James Hogan in 2006.

=== Equity Alliance ===
In December 2011, Etihad announced it had acquired a 29.21% stake in Air Berlin, Europe's sixth-largest airline, and Hogan was appointed Vice Chairman. It followed this up with minority stakes in other airlines—Air Seychelles (40%), Aer Lingus (2.987%), Virgin Australia (10%).

On 1 August 2013, the president of the company, Hogan, signed a deal with Aleksandar Vučić, the First Deputy Prime Minister of Serbia, in Belgrade, granting Etihad a 49% stake in the Serbian national carrier Jat Airways. The Serbian government retained 51% of the shares, with the company was rebranded as Air Serbia. In September 2012, the Indian government announced that foreign airlines could hold up to 49% stake in Indian carriers. On 24 April 2013, Jet Airways announced it was ready to sell a 24% stake to Etihad for US$379 million. The deal was completed on 12 November 2013.

At the 2013 Dubai Airshow, Etihad announced it was acquiring a 33.3% stake in the Swiss carrier Darwin Airline, which was rebranded as Etihad Regional in March 2014. Etihad sold its stake in Darwin in 2017.

On 1 August 2014, Etihad agreed to acquire a 49% stake in the Italian flag carrier Alitalia for an estimated €560 million. The deal was finalised on 8 August 2014. On 1 January 2015, Alitalia-CAI formally transferred its operations to Alitalia-SAI, a new entity owned 49% by Etihad and 51% by the Alitalia-CAI shareholders.

The airline established its airline alliance, Etihad Airways Partners, in October 2015. It ceased operations in 2018 after several of its members fell into financial difficulties. Etihad held minority investments in the participating airlines and previously had a stake in Virgin Australia until its insolvency in April 2020 with no return on investment. In May 2016, the management structure was reshuffled, as Hogan became CEO of the airline's parent company, Etihad Aviation Group. Peter Baumgartner, formerly the airline's Chief Commercial Officer, became chief executive officer of the airline, reporting to Hogan. In December 2016 Handelsblatt Global reported that Hogan was expected to be dismissed after a "failed spree of acquisitions in Europe."

On 24 January 2017, the Etihad Aviation Group Board of Directors announced that Hogan (along with Group CFO James Rigney) would be stepping down "in the second half of 2017". Peter Baumgartner, (former CEO of the airline), became the acting CEO as it faced mounting losses from its investments in Air Berlin and Alitalia. On 2 May 2017, Alitalia filed for bankruptcy. Hogan and Rigney left Etihad later that month. On 27 July, Etihad reported a loss of US$1.873 billion for 2016. On 15 August, Air Berlin filed for bankruptcy after Etihad withdrew its financial support.

As an interim measure, the board appointed Ray Gammell as CEO (previously Chief People and Performance Officer) while searching for a permanent replacement. On 9 January 2018, Etihad Airways appointed Mark Powers as Group CFO, replacing interim Group CFO Ricky Thirion. On 2 July 2017, the United States Department of Homeland Security lifted the electronics ban on Etihad Airways after the airline enhanced its passenger screening processes.

In June 2018, Etihad reported a net loss of US$1.52 billion for 2017.

In February 2019, Etihad announced large order cancellations for both Airbus and Boeing aircraft. The airline terminated contracts for all 42 Airbus A350-900s, two A350-1000s and 19 of 24 ordered Boeing 777X.

On 1 May 2021, it was announced Etihad Airways sold its 40% stake in Air Seychelles back to the Government of Seychelles.

On 13 May 2023, the Serbian Government announced it had finished acquiring 100% equity in Air Serbia, after several years of buying back stakes from Etihad.

=== Effect of COVID-19 ===
In May 2020, shortly after Air France retired its entire Airbus A380 fleet due to the COVID-19 pandemic, there were rumors that Etihad Airways was considering canceling all its remaining Airbus A350 orders and retiring its entire Airbus A380 fleet due to more financial losses caused by the COVID-19 pandemic. Etihad's CEO Tony Douglas said that Etihad's A380 fleet was very likely not to fly again in passenger service, and therefore likely to be withdrawn after only seven years in service. This move would make Etihad the third Airbus A380 operator to retire its Airbus A380 fleet, following Air France-KLM and Hi Fly Malta. However, by 26 May 2020, Etihad confirmed that the airline will not cancel its remaining Airbus A350 orders and plans to proceed with them. The airline also confirmed that it had no plans to ditch its Airbus A380 fleet into early retirement, unlike Air France, despite the COVID-19 pandemic.

However, as of October 2020, some sources stated that the Etihad Airbus A380 still had a potential possibility of early retirement due to the aircraft market changes and demand caused by the COVID-19 pandemic as Douglas referred to the Airbus A380 as a heavily inefficient behemoth handicapped by two engines too many. Douglas also said that smaller long-range twin-jet aircraft such as the Boeing 777X, 787, and Airbus A350 can do the job far more efficiently and sustainably than that of the A380.

In February 2021, Etihad Airways vaccinated all its operating pilots and cabin crew against COVID-19, the first airline to vaccinate all its operating pilots and cabin crew. Since most of Etihad's flights were grounded between March and June 2020, the airline's passenger traffic dropped by 76% to 4.2 million in 2020. Throughout 2020, due to the COVID-19 pandemic, Etihad Airways laid off over 1,000 cabin crew and pilots. Etihad had reported significant losses even before the pandemic; since 2016, it lost over $5.62 billion and in 2019 losses amounted to $870 million. The airline's full-year losses amounted to $1.7 billion in 2020, and $476 million in 2021.

=== Return to profitability ===
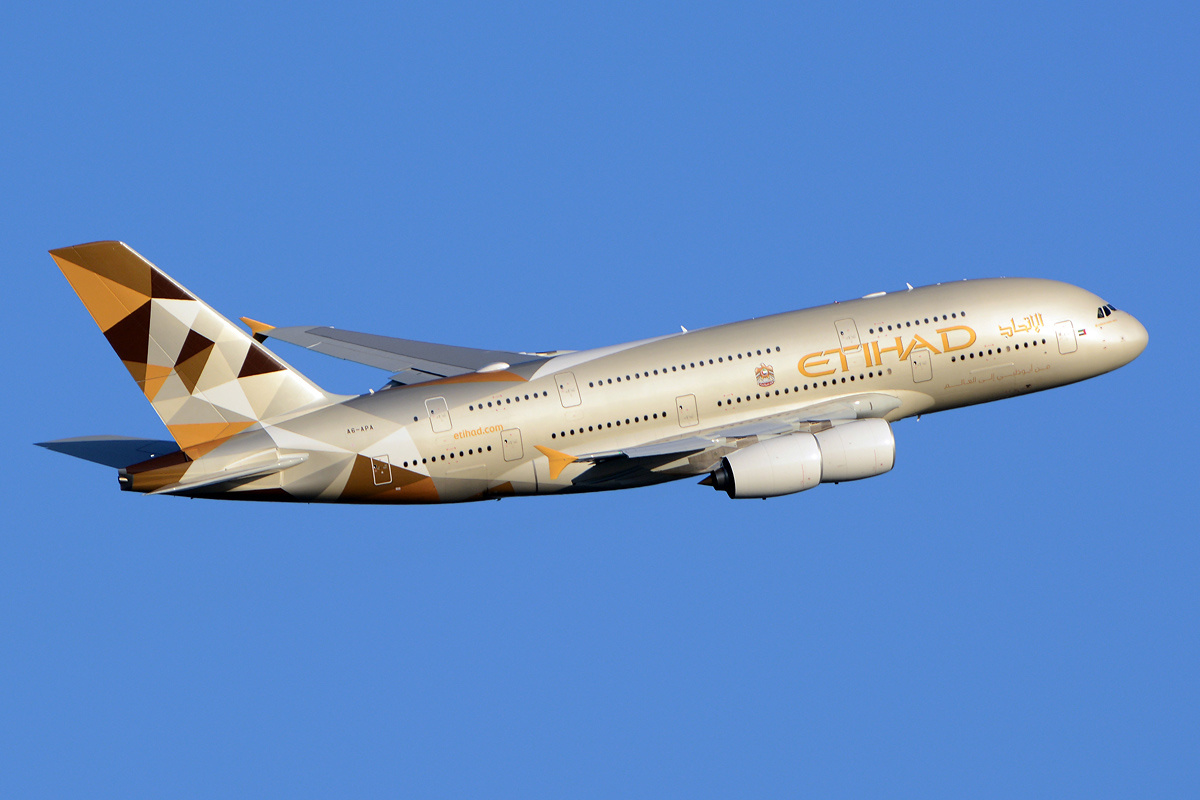
Etihad Airways Airbus A380

In 2021, Etihad Airways introduced its sonic identity, created in partnership with the agency Sixième Son, becoming one of the first airlines in the Middle East to deploy a comprehensive audio branding system across its touchpoints. Inspired by the traditional Al Sadu weaving technique, the sonic identity blends Emirati instruments with contemporary textures and is deployed across cabins, lounges, customer interactions and brand communications.

In July 2022, Etihad announced a record-breaking first-half profitability of $296 million. This was achieved due to the increased passenger travel demand. Etihad carried 3 million more passengers in the first half of 2022, compared to the first half of 2021. In October 2022 Etihad Airways was transferred ownership over to Abu Dhabi sovereign wealth fund ADQ. Etihad, Wizz Air Abu Dhabi, Abu Dhabi Airports, Etihad Holidays, and more were all brought into common ownership. Although the airline had grounded its fleet of 10 A380-800 aircraft with no initial plans to redeploy the aircraft, it was decided that they would return to service. In 2023, Etihad redeployed four of their 10 jumbo jets onto their London–Heathrow service, with later decisions that an additional A380 would return to the fleet.

The airline later announced the redeployment of their A380 to their New York–JFK route in April 2024 as well as to Paris–Charles de Gaulle from November 2024, Singapore from February 2025, as well as Toronto–Pearson from June 2025. Etihad continued to operate to Ben Gurion Airport in Tel Aviv during the Gaza war, and made it their busiest route in December 2025, with six daily flights, the first Etihad route to have this frequency. The AUH-TLV route had 100,000 passengers in the first quarter of 2026, with more than two-thirds using Abu Dhabi as a hub to travel to Etihad destinations elsewhere in Asia.

== Corporate affairs ==
=== Head office ===
Etihad has its head office in Khalifa City, Abu Dhabi, near Abu Dhabi International Airport. Etihad spent 183.6 million UAE dirhams (US$50 million) in 2007 to have its new head office and training centre built. The new head office was completed in 2007.

=== Structure ===
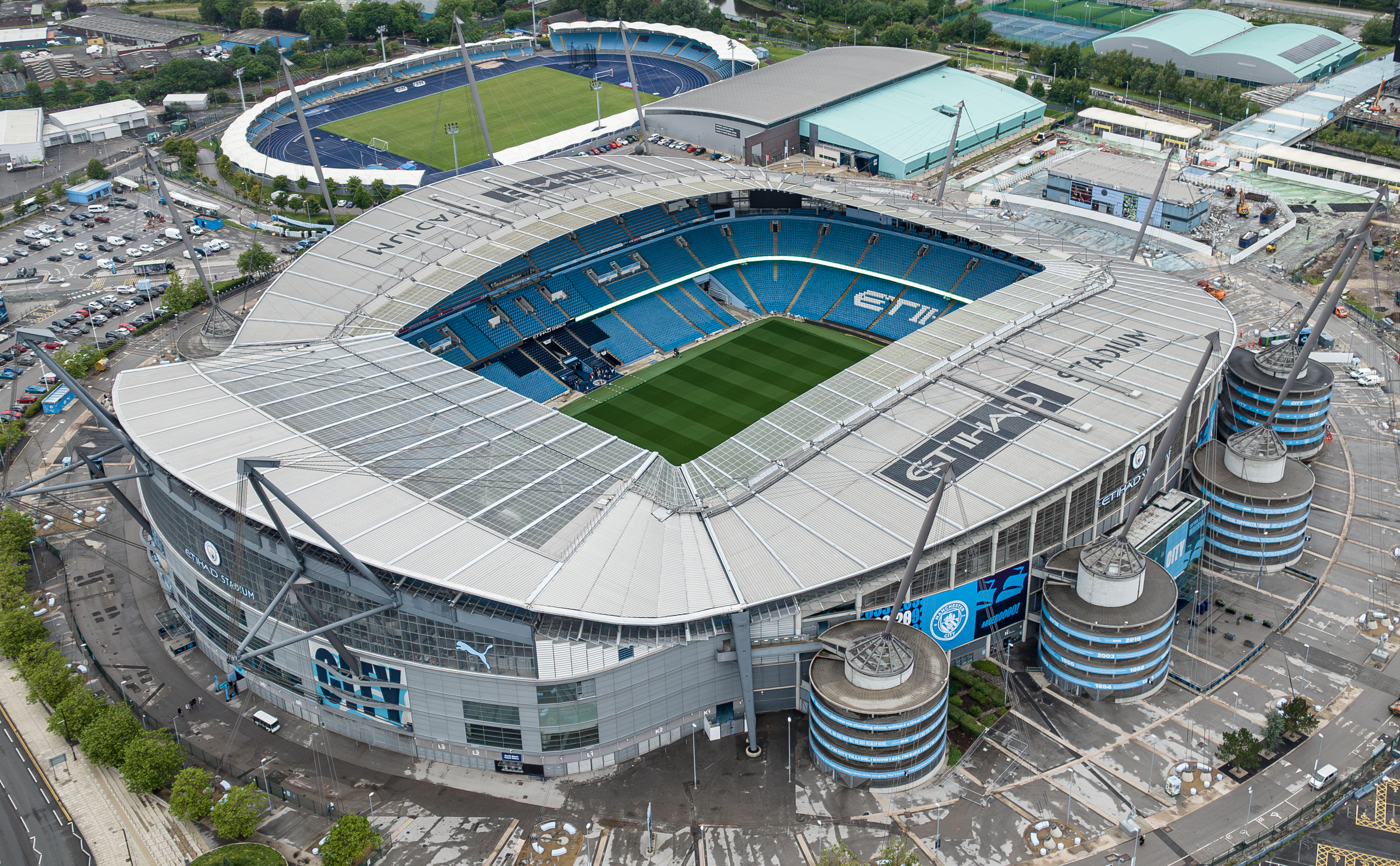
Etihad Stadium, the home ground of Manchester City F.C.

Etihad is governed by a board of directors chaired by Mohamed Mubarak Al Mazrouei and operates in terms of its founding legislation and the Articles of Association of the company. The board consists of seven independent non-executive members and has two sub-committees, an executive committee and an Audit Committee, each with its charter and chairman. Other members of the board include Ahmed Ali Al Sayegh, H. E. Mohamed Khalifa Al Mubarak, Mohamed Hareb Sultan Al Yousef, Hamad Abdulla Al Shamsi, Khalifa Sultan Al Suwaidi, and Ahmed Ali Matar Al Romaithi.

The airline was led previously by James Hogan (formerly CEO of Gulf Air) who was appointed as president and chief executive officer from 10 September 2006 until January 2018. He was succeeded by Tony Douglas, who held the post until October 2022. The current CEO of Etihad Group is Antonoaldo Neves.

=== Etihad Airways equity alliance ===
Etihad's equity alliance was composed of airlines in which Etihad had minority shareholdings. These consisted of stakes in Air Berlin, Air Serbia, Air Seychelles, Alitalia, and Virgin Australia. As of year-end 2023, Etihad has exited all of these holdings. With Virgin Australia's bankruptcy and subsequent restructuring, the company's shareholding in the airline ended in its entirety. In late December 2020, the government of Serbia recapitalised Air Serbia, increasing its stake to 82%, thus decreasing Etihad's stake to 18%. The airline company was also a part of the now-disbanded Etihad Airways Partners alliance between 2015 and 2018.

=== Business trends ===
Key trends for Etihad Airways are shown below (as at years ending 31 December):

Profits*: Earlier profit/loss figures do not appear to have ever been published; the company announced, however, that it became profitable in 2011.

	Revenue (US$bn)	Profits/loss (US$m)	Number of employees	Passengers flown (m)	Load factor (%)	Fleet size (Note: at year end)	Sources
2011	4.1	14	9,038	8.3	76	64	
2012	4.8	42	10,656	10.2	78	70	
2013	6.1	48	13,535	11.5	78	89	
2014	7.6	73	17,712	14.8	79	110	
2015	9.0	103	26,566	17.6	79	121	
2016	8.4	−1,873	26,229	18.4	79	119	
2017	6.1	−1,523	24,558	18.6	78.5	115	
2018	5.9	−1,280	21,855	17.8	76.4	111	
2019	5.6	−870	20,369	17.5	78.7	107	
2020	2.6	−1,700	13,587	4.2	78.7	103	
2021	3.1	−476	12,533	3.5	39.6	67	
2022	5.0	25	8,112	10.3	81.9	71	
2023	5.5	143	9,000+	14.0	86	85	
2024	6.9	476	11,000+	18.5	87	97	
2025	8.4	698	13,000+	22.4	88	127	

=== Company slogans ===
- "From Abu Dhabi to the World" – De facto slogan of the airline.
- "Beyond Borders" - 2025, Primarily used as the slogan of the airline. "Launched" in October 2025
- "The World Is Our Home, You Are Our Guest" – 2013
- "Flying Reimagined" – 2015. The global campaign was headed with a launch of a commercial filmed on location in Abu Dhabi featuring Nicole Kidman as Etihad ambassador and the Airbus A380 The Residence cabin.
- "Choose Well" – 2018

=== Corporate sponsorship ===
==== Current team sponsorship deals ====
Team	Sport	Located	Sponsorship commencement	Notes
Anorthosis Famagusta FC	Association football (Cyprus First Division)	Larnaca, Cyprus	November 2013	
Capital City Go-Go	Basketball (NBA G League)	Washington, D.C., USA	August 2018	
Chennai Super Kings	Cricket (Indian Premier League)	Chennai, India	February 2024	Back sponsor (until 2025); front sponsor (2025 onwards)
Girona FC	Association football (La Liga)	Girona, Spain	August 2024	Back sponsor
Harlequins	Rugby union (PREM Rugby)	London, United Kingdom	30 July 2007	The sponsorship also includes renaming the East Stand at the Twickenham Stoop (the home of Harlequins) to the Etihad Stand. Etihad's logo is painted on the roof of the stand which is under the flight path to London Heathrow Airport.
London Broncos	Rugby league (RFL Championship)	London, United Kingdom	30 July 2007	The sponsorship also includes renaming the East Stand at the Twickenham Stoop (the home of Harlequins) to the Etihad Stand. Etihad's logo is painted on the roof of the stand which is under the flight path to London Heathrow Airport.
Manchester City FC	Association football (Premier League)	Manchester, England	May 2009	Part of the deal now includes the renaming of Manchester City's home ground as Etihad Stadium.
Mumbai City FC	Association football (Indian Super League)	Mumbai, India	December 2019	Principal sponsor and front sponsor of Indian Super League Champions and league winners Mumbai City FC. Home kit colour resembles that of sister club Manchester City.
Melbourne City FC	Association football (Australian Professional Leagues)	Melbourne, Victoria, Australia	May 2014	Home kit colour resembles that of sister club Manchester City.
Mumbai Indians	Cricket (Indian Premier League)	Mumbai, India	April 2014 to 2016	Back sponsor
New York City FC	Association football (MLS)	New York, USA	13 November 2014	Etihad also owns the naming rights to their new stadium Etihad Park.
Washington Capitals	Ice hockey (NHL)	Washington, D.C., USA	11 May 2015	
Washington Mystics	Basketball (WNBA)	Washington, D.C., USA	11 May 2015	
Washington Wizards	Basketball (NBA)	Washington, D.C., USA	11 May 2015	
Al Nassr FC	Association football (Saudi Pro League)	Al Riyadh, Saudi Arabia	August 2018	
McLaren Formula 1 Team	Formula racing (Formula One)	Woking, England	26 February 2026	The sponsorship will be displayed on the rear wing and halo of the cars and on the driver helmets.
McLaren United Autosports WEC Hypercar Team	Endurance racing (FIA World Endurance Championship)	Woking, England	26 February 2026	

==== Event and organisations ====
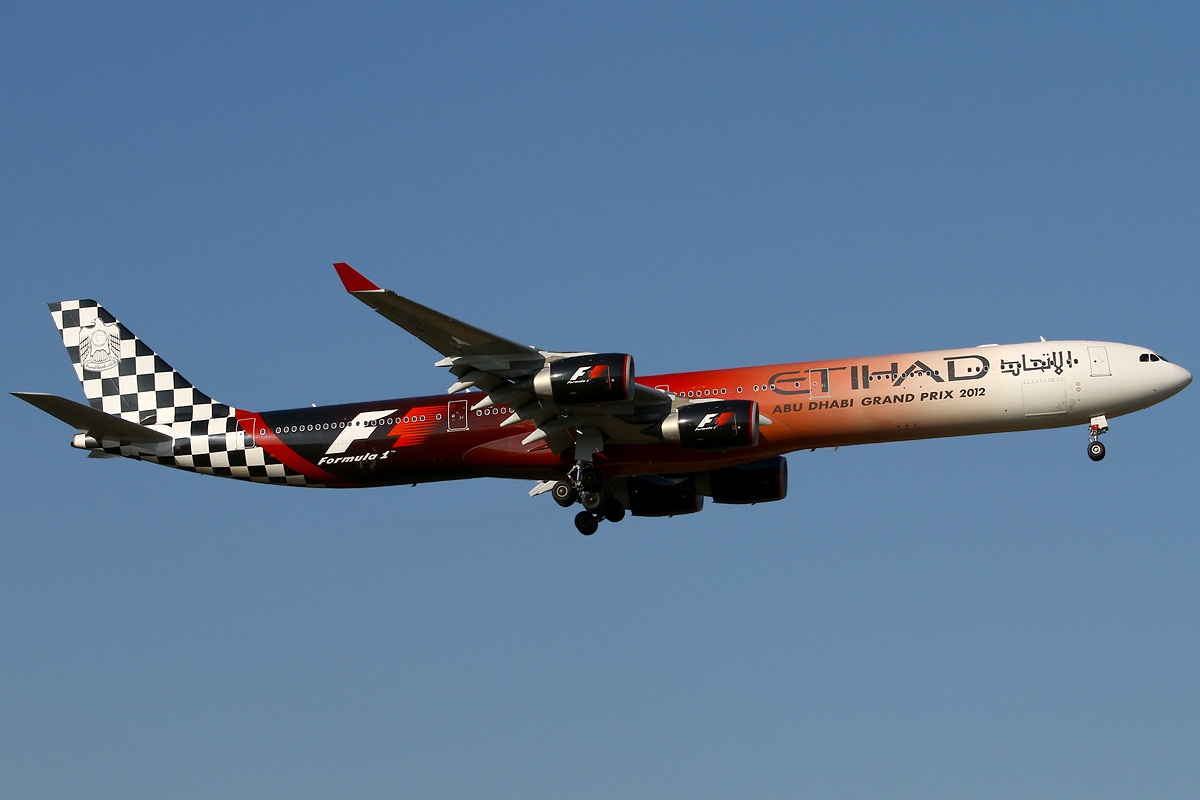
A now-retired Airbus A340-600 in the Abu Dhabi Grand Prix livery

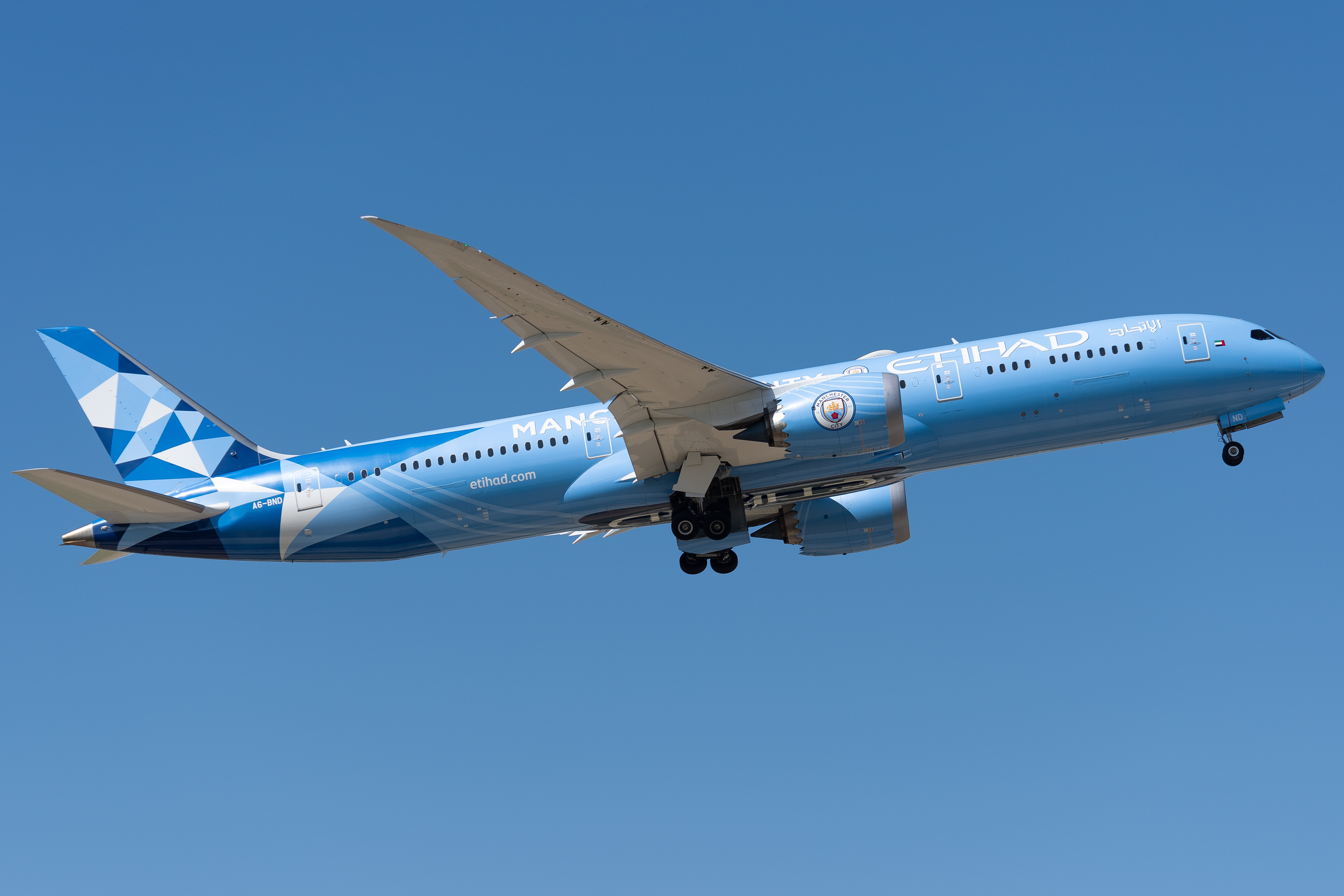
Etihad Airways is the sponsor of Manchester City F.C. One of their Boeing 787-9s (A6-BND) is adorned in a special Manchester City livery.

- On 18 December 2007, Etihad announced that it would become the title sponsor for the 2009 Abu Dhabi Grand Prix to be held on Yas Island, the F1 logo and the words "Formula 1 Etihad Airways Abu Dhabi Grand Prix" appeared on the aircraft for one month before the race.
- In October 2008, it was announced that Etihad would take over sponsorship of the Docklands Stadium in Melbourne, Australia (previously known as the Telstra Dome). The name change to Etihad Stadium took effect on 1 March 2009.
- On 19 March 2008, it was announced that Etihad Airways would become a main sponsor for the All-Ireland Senior Hurling Championship from 2008 to 2010, which was later extended until 2012. On 12 April 2012, the Gaelic Athletic Association signed a new five-year sponsorship deal with Etihad.
- On 25 March 2014, Etihad announced a partnership with Major League Soccer (MLS) in the United States to become the Official Airline Partner of MLS, in a multi-year deal.
- Etihad Airways were the main sponsor for the 2015 Etihad Airways GAA World Games held in Abu Dhabi and the 2016 Etihad Airways GAA World Games held in Dublin. The sponsorship has since ceased.
- In 2017, it was announced that Etihad Airways would collaborate with IMG Models on a show called Model Diaries, showcasing models in high fashion as they travel to fashion shows around the world, and in November 2018, its first episode featured high fashion model Xiao Wen Ju as she traveled to Dubai.

==== Former sponsorships ====
- Etihad was a sponsor of UAE sports clubs, including the Abu Dhabi Rugby Union Football Club, the Abu Dhabi International Sailing School, and the Abu Dhabi International Marine Sports Club (ADIMSC), as well as the Al-Jazira Club.
- It also had sponsored the two Arena Football League teams, the Baltimore Brigade & Washington Valor, before the league went bankrupt and dissolved in 2019.
- Etihad has sponsored several Formula One teams. Etihad was a sponsor of Scuderia Ferrari and was the title sponsor of Spyker as Etihad Aldar Spyker F1 Team.

=== Cargo ===
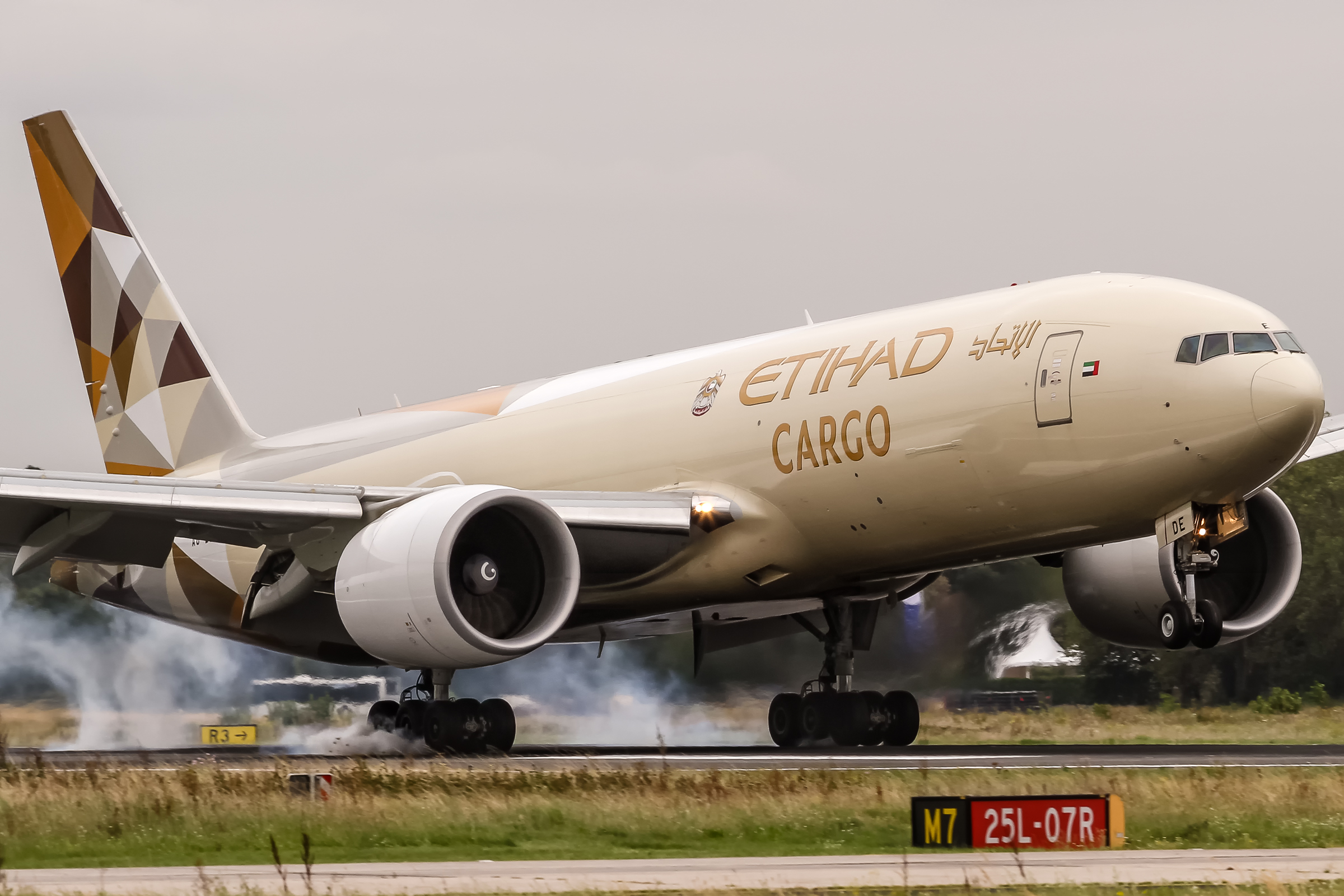
Etihad Cargo Boeing 777F

Etihad Cargo, formerly Etihad Crystal Cargo, is the dedicated freight operations branch of Etihad. The carrier refreshed its brand image in June 2012 dropping the "Crystal" part, with full Etihad Cargo titles now applied billboard-style in line with the airline's current corporate design. Etihad Cargo operates six Boeing 777Fs. It has previously operated a Boeing 747-400F and Boeing 747-8F, both leased from Atlas Air but operated in full Etihad Cargo colours. In January 2018, Etihad announced it would retire and either sell or lease out its five relatively new Airbus A330-200F freighters due to a change in strategy and reduction of freight capacity. In August 2018, it was announced that all five A330 freighters had been sold to DHL Aviation.

Etihad Cargo delivered 368,000 tonnes of cargo in 2012, a tonnage growth of 19 percent on the back of a capacity increase of 14 percent in available tonnage kilometres. Etihad's new facility at Zayed International Airport is equipped to handle more than 500,000 tonnes annually. In September 2018, Etihad Cargo announced a revised and heavily downsized network of cargo destinations to reflect the reduced fleet and a focus on core freight operations.

== Destinations ==
As of June 2023, Etihad serves 81 passenger and cargo destinations across Africa, Europe, North America, Asia and Australia from its hub at Zayed International Airport. Until terminating the São Paulo service in late March 2017, Etihad Airways was one of the few carriers to have passenger services to all six inhabited continents.

As 2021 began, the airline suspended its flights to South Africa as a part of its ongoing review of network performance. Etihad opened a twice-weekly route to Tel Aviv, Israel, in April 2021. Later in June 2023, the airline announced expansions of some routes such as expanding the frequency of flights to Rome from Abu Dhabi from seven to eleven times per week.

On 25 November 2024, Etihad made a public announcement of the 10 new destinations of the national airline of UAE as part of their rapid expansion program. The destinations are Addis Ababa, Algiers, Atlanta, Chiang Mai, Hanoi, Hong Kong, Krabi, Medan, Phnom Penh, Taipei and Tunis.

=== Codeshare agreements ===
Etihad Airways has codeshare agreements with the following airlines:

- AccesRail (railway)
- Aegean Airlines
- Aer Lingus
- Aeroflot
- Air Astana
- Air Arabia Abu Dhabi (subsidiary)
- Air Canada
- Air Cambodia
- Air Europa
- Air New Zealand
- Akasa Air
- All Nippon Airways
- American Airlines
- Asiana Airlines
- Avianca
- Azul Brazilian Airlines
- Bangkok Airways
- Batik Air Malaysia
- Brussels Airlines
- China Eastern Airlines
- Condor
- Deutsche Bahn (railway)
- Ethiopian Airlines
- Egyptair
- El Al
- Flynas
- Garuda Indonesia
- Gulf Air
- Hong Kong Airlines
- ITA Airways
- JetBlue
- Korean Air
- Kuwait Airways
- Lufthansa
- Maldivian
- Middle East Airlines
- Oman Air
- Pakistan International Airlines
- Precision Air
- Royal Air Maroc
- Royal Jordanian
- Saudia
- Scandinavian Airlines
- Sky Express
- SNCF (railway)
- SriLankan Airlines
- Starlux Airlines
- Swiss International Air Lines
- Trenitalia (railway)
- TAP Air Portugal
- Turkish Airlines
- Uzbekistan Airways

=== Interline agreements ===
Etihad Airways has interline agreements with the following airlines:

- AeroItalia
- Air Peace
- British Airways
- Jeju Air
- Lao Airlines
- Singapore Airlines

== Fleet ==
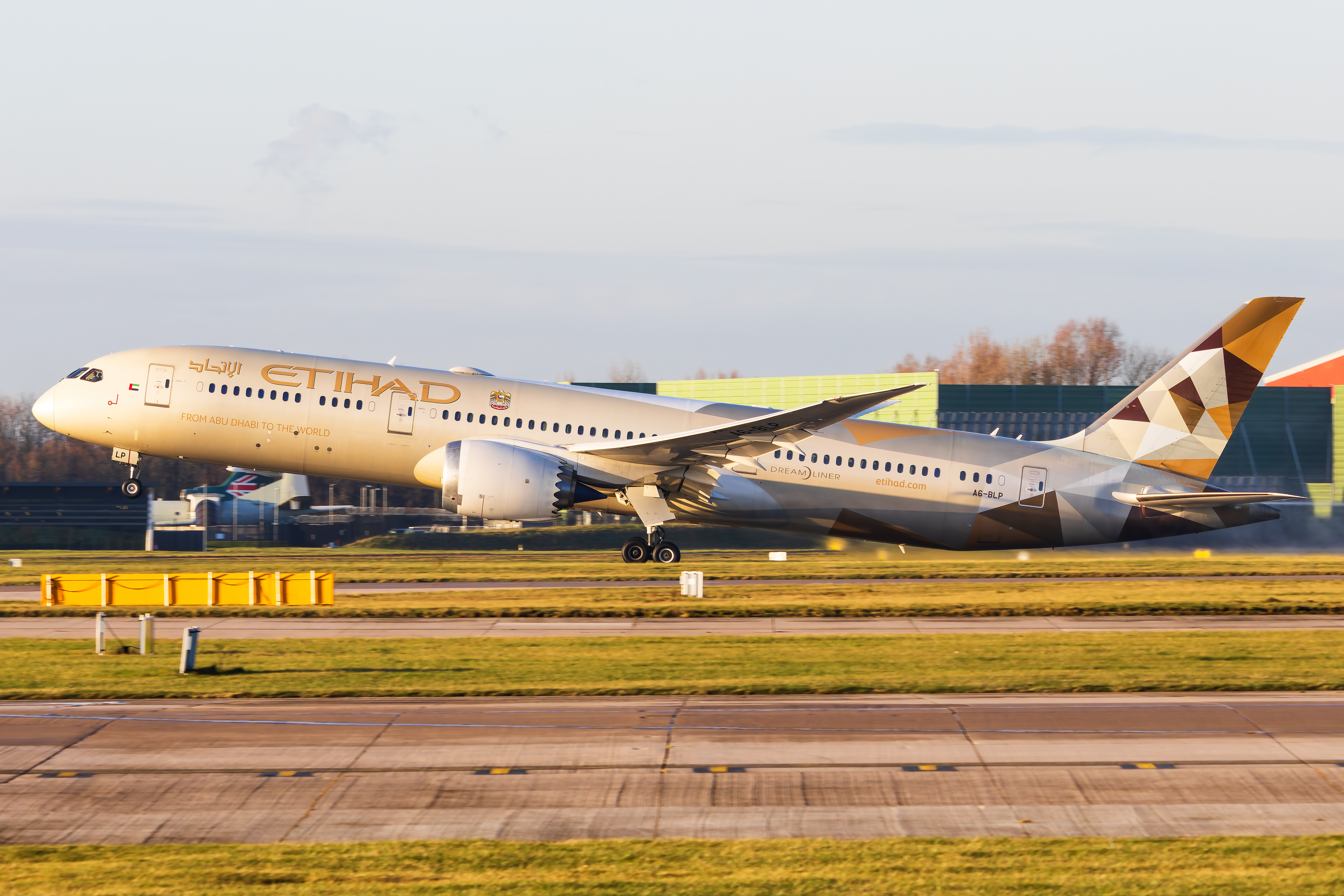
Etihad Airways Boeing 787-9 at Manchester Airport

Etihad Airways operates a fleet of narrow-body aircraft from Airbus and wide-body aircraft from Airbus and Boeing. Etihad's fleet consists of 100 Airbus and Boeing aircraft from six aircraft families: the Airbus A320 family, Airbus A320neo family, Airbus A350-1000, Airbus A380-800, Boeing 777 and Boeing 787 Dreamliner.

During the COVID-19 pandemic, Etihad Airways grounded all 10 Airbus A380-800 aircraft and initially had no plans to return them to service after the pandemic. However, since 2023, four Airbus A380-800s returned to services, flying on the route to London–Heathrow; in 2024, A380 service resumed to New York–JFK and Paris–Charles de Gaulle. Although Etihad placed an order for 25 Boeing 777X aircraft in 2013, by May 2024, CEO Antonoaldo Neves confirmed that the contracts with Boeing had been restructured. As a result, Etihad now holds an option to purchase the 777X planes but also has the option to acquire more 787s. Neves further clarified that the 777X is not part of Etihad's five-year plan.

== Livery ==
=== Present livery ===
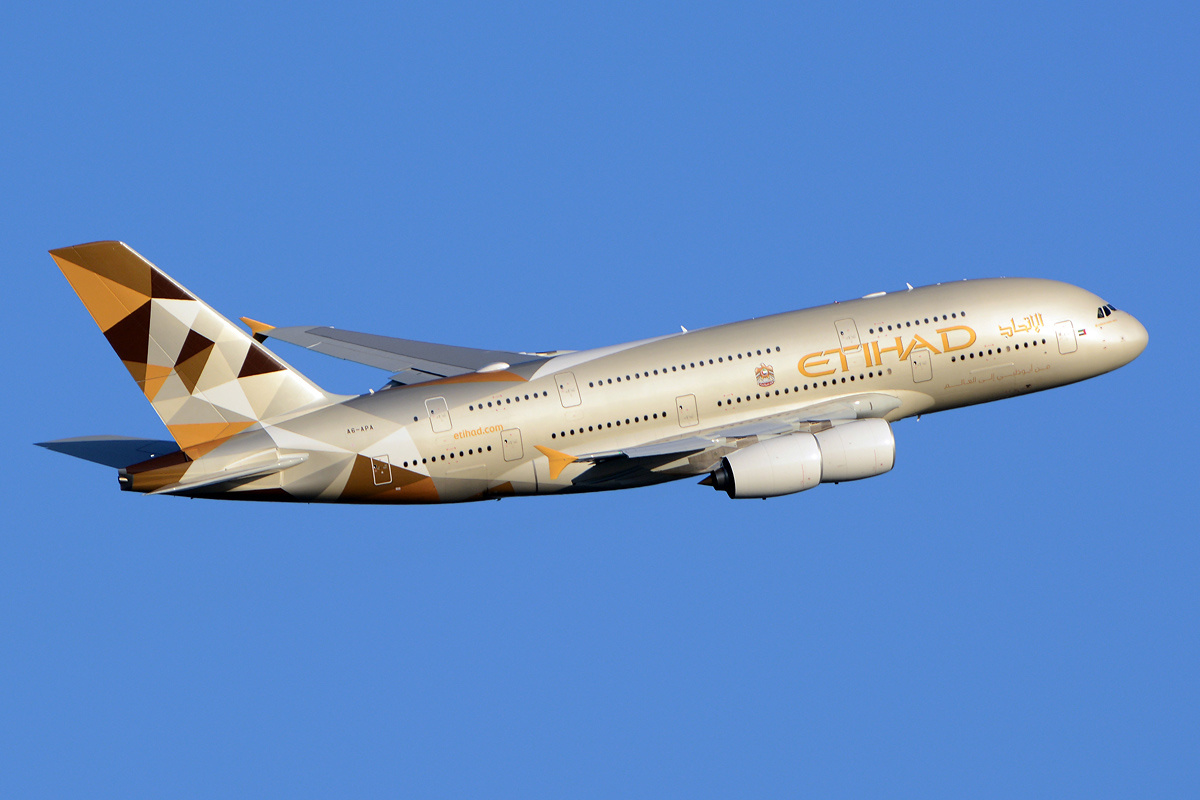
Etihad's current livery, painted on an Airbus A380

The present livery – named Facets of Abu Dhabi – was unveiled in September 2014 on the first of the airline's new A380s. It features a golden and silver triangular tessellation on the vertical stabiliser and rear fuselage. A golden Etihad logo and a UAE emblem over the windows, with the UAE flag painted on the front door. The background was painted in light beige and the wingtip also has a UAE emblem. The golden colour was inspired by the colour of the Arabian desert.

=== Former livery (2003–2017) ===
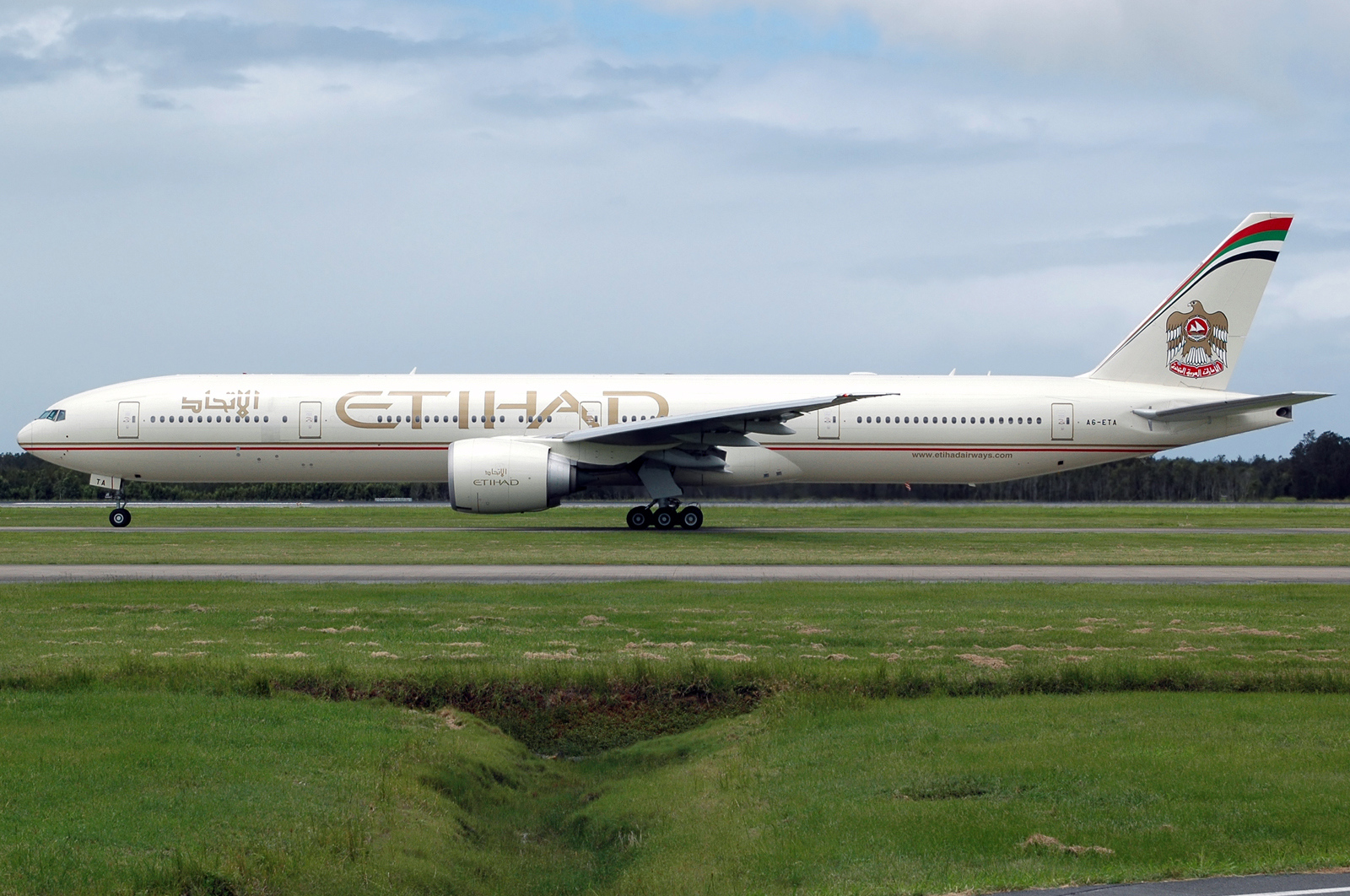
Etihad's previous livery, painted on a Boeing 777-300ER

The former livery features a UAE flag and the national falcon emblem on the vertical stabiliser and a golden Etihad logo on the windows. Red and golden stripes were painted on the fuselage. This livery is still present on a few Boeing 777-300ERs and Airbus A320s.

== Services ==
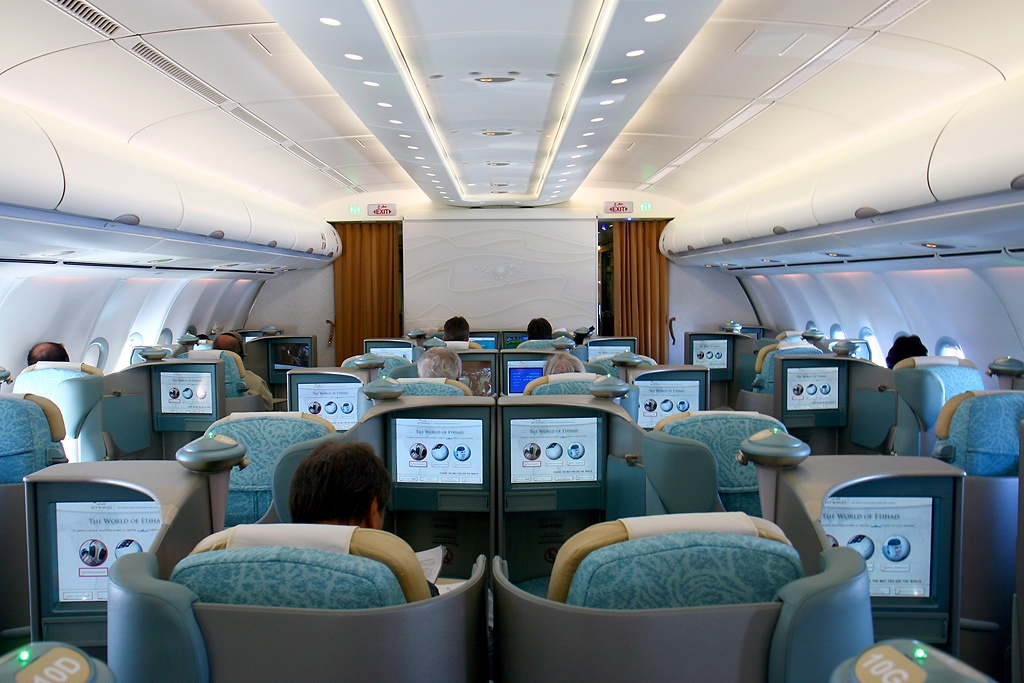
The old "Pearl Business Class" cabin on an Etihad Airbus A340-500 in 2007

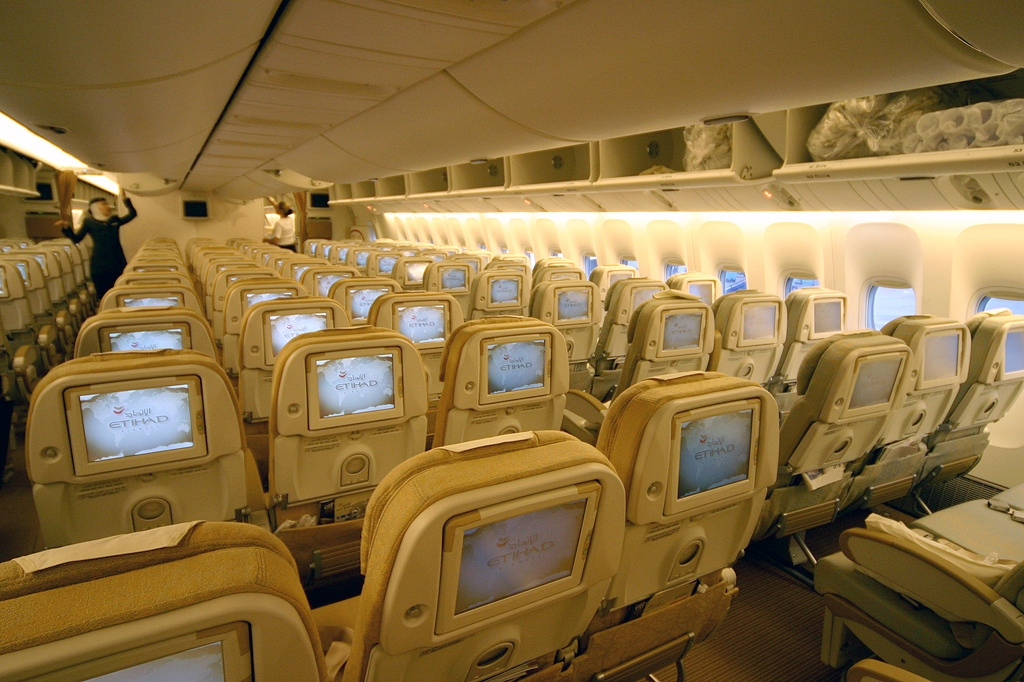
Previous Economy Class seats on an Etihad Boeing 777-300ER in 2006

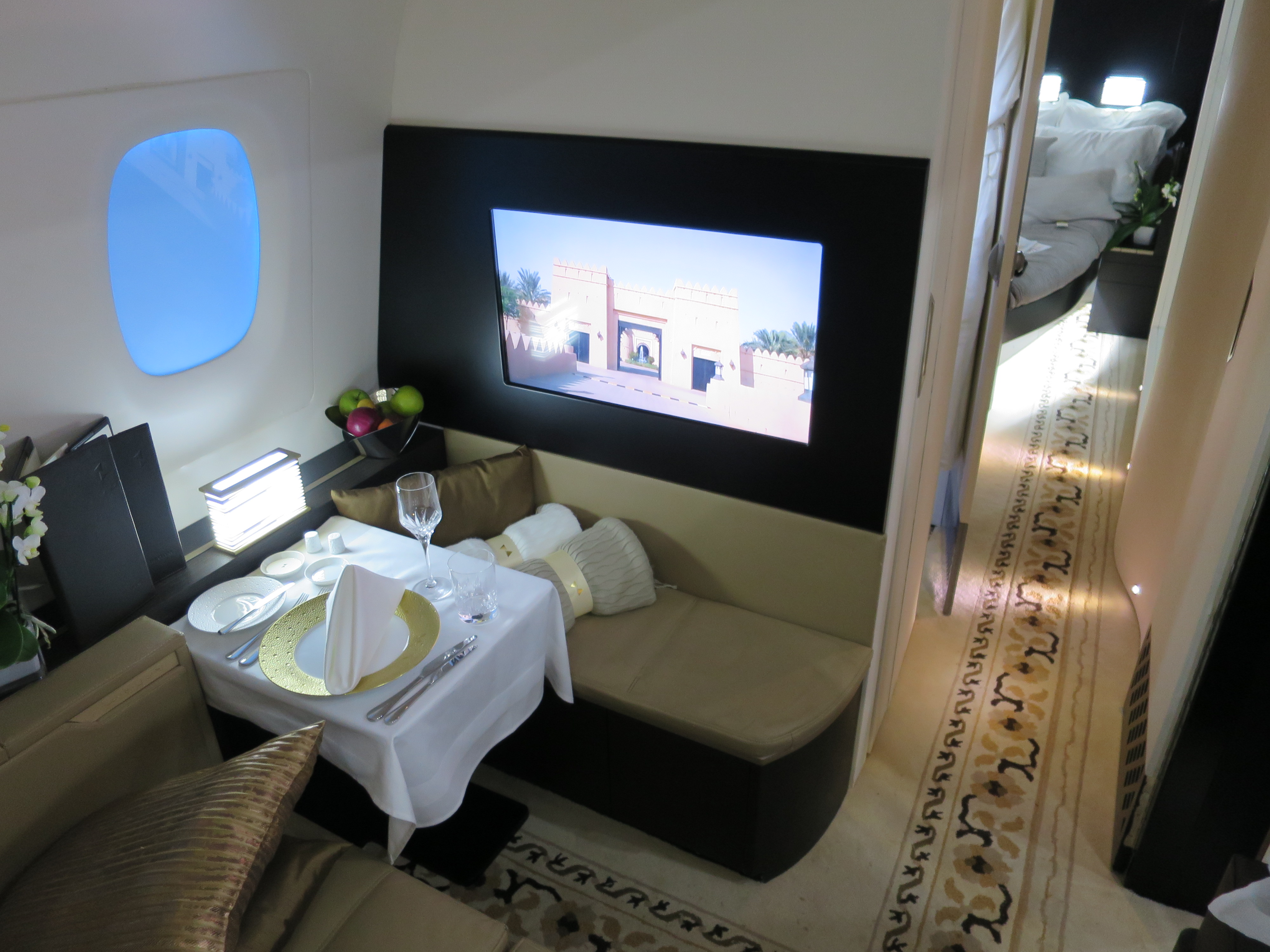
Etihad Airways offers their The Residence product on their Airbus A380-800s. The Residence apartments are equipped with a bedroom, living room, and an en-suite shower room.

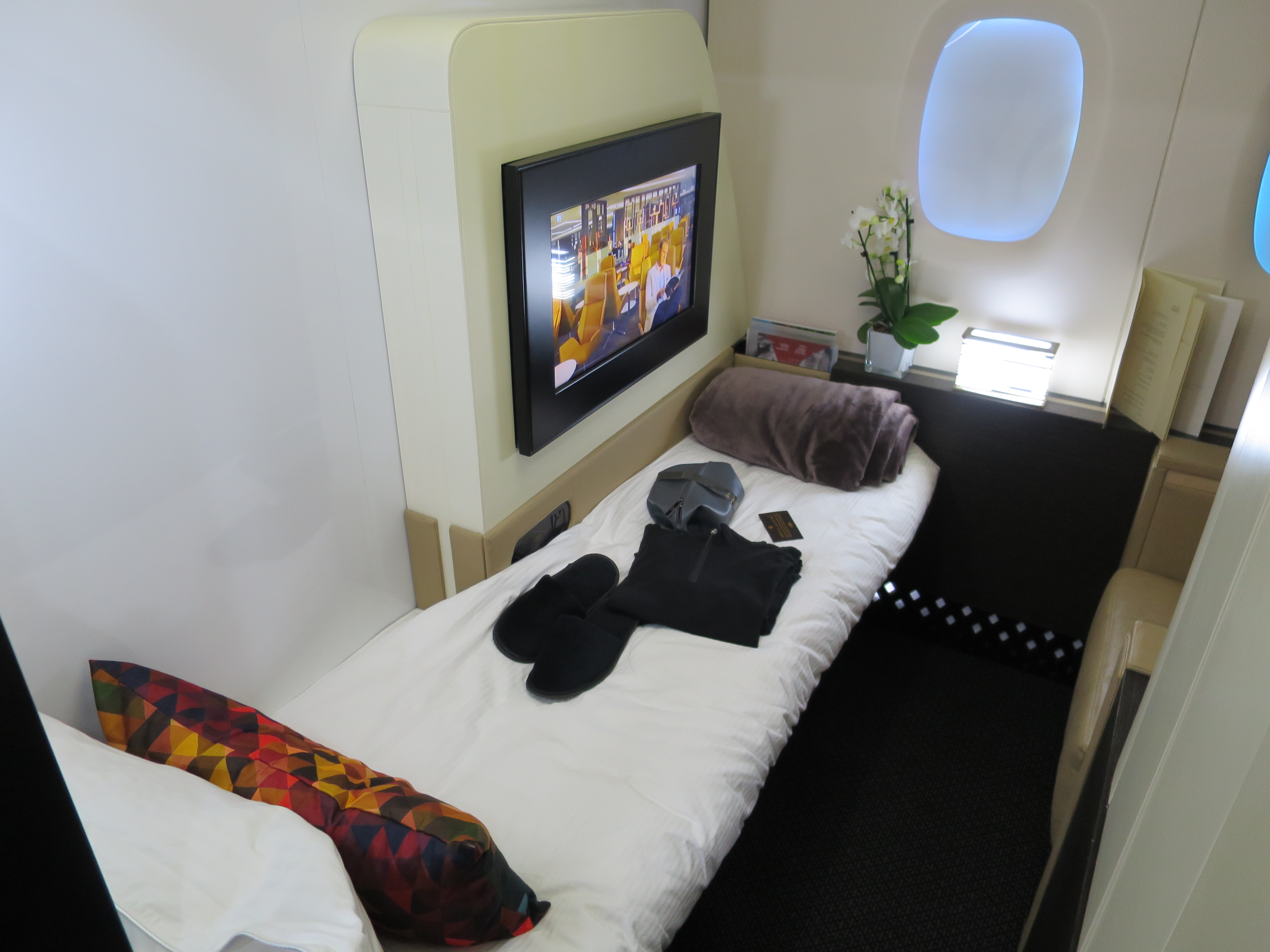
The Etihad First Apartment on Airbus A380-800

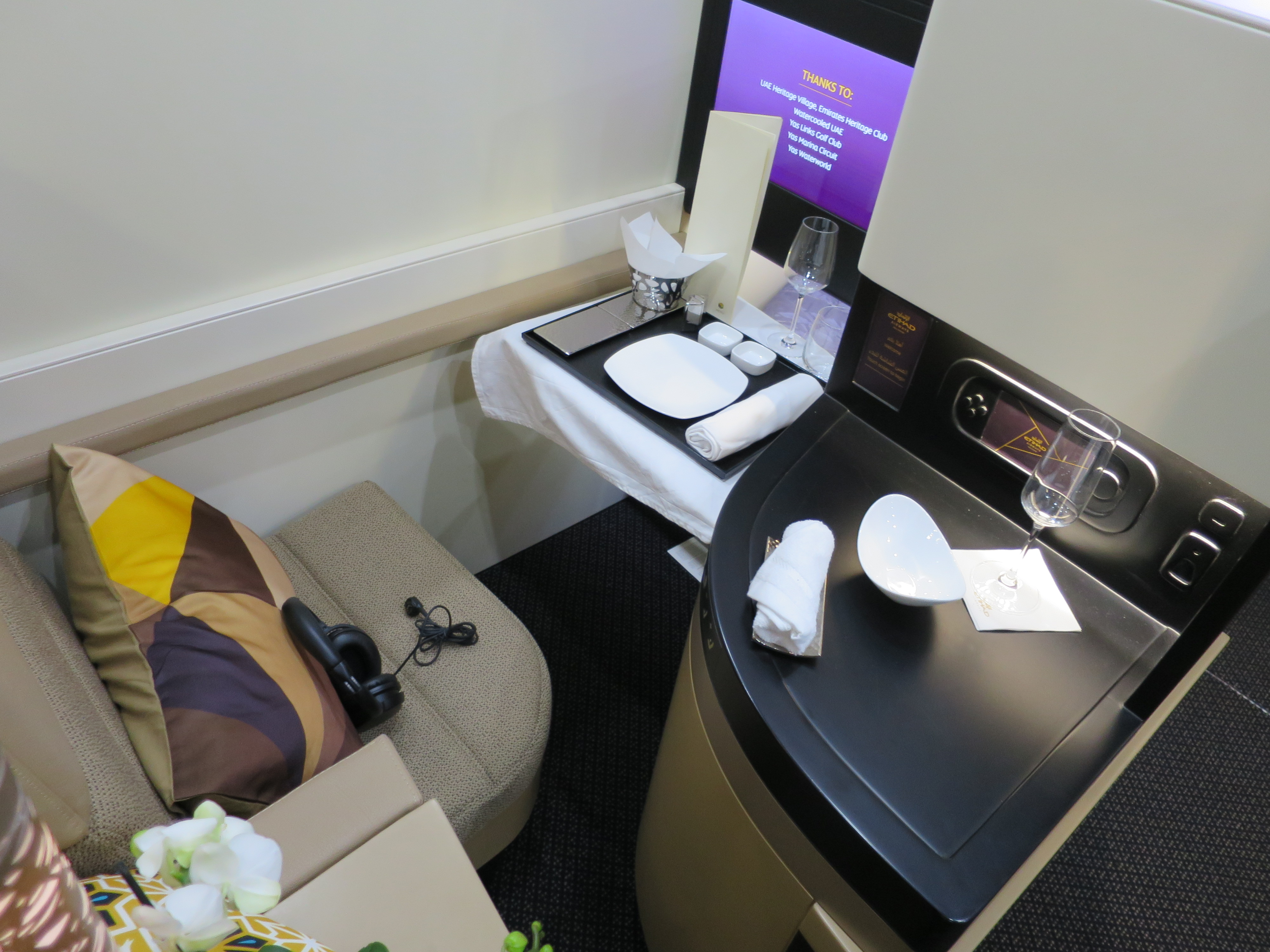
The Etihad Business Studio on Airbus A380-800

=== New cabins ===
With the introduction of the Airbus A380 and Boeing 787, new cabins were introduced, their names being: The Residence (A380 only), the First Apartments (A380 only), First Suite (787-9 only), Business Studio and Economy Smart seat. The rest of the fleet will gradually be retrofitted with these cabins except for the Residence and First Apartment cabins, which are exclusive to the Airbus A380. The Residence was the only three-room cabin on any airline when it was introduced in December 2014.

The Residence (Airbus A380 only)

The Residence accommodates one or two people, in a space of 125 square feet (11.6 m^{2}). It features a private living room, bedroom, and bathroom. It features a 60.6-inch (154 cm)-wide two-seater reclining sofa and 32-inch (81 cm) TV monitor in the lounge; an en-suite bathroom with shower, an 82-inch (210 cm)-long, 47.5-inch (121 cm)-wide double bed in the bedroom which also includes a 27-inch (69 cm) TV monitor, and formerly included a personal butler.

The Apartment (Airbus A380 only)

First Class suites are offered on Airbus A380s and are named "The Apartment". There are nine in total, configured 1-1 across a single aisle, and take up a total area of 39 square feet (3.6 m^{2}) each. Each one features a 30.3-inch (77 cm)-wide reclining chair; a full-length ottoman which can be transformed into a bed; a 24-inch (61 cm) TV monitor which can swing to align itself to the ottoman so that it can be viewed from the bed; a vanity cabinet; and a bar with assorted chilled drinks. In 2015, this class was named the world's best first-class due to its innovation.

First Suite (Boeing 787–9 only)

Some Boeing 787-9s offer eight First Suites. The service includes a 26-inch (66 cm)-wide reclining lounge chair (which converts into an 80.5-inch (204 cm) fully flat bed); dining table; and a 24-inch (61 cm) TV monitor. All covers are designed by Poltrona Frau. There is a personal wardrobe, along with total privacy with high sliding doors.

Business Studio

The "Business Studio" is on both models, with 70 seats on the Airbus A380s, 28 on the Boeing 787-9s, and 32 on the Boeing 787-10s. The studio seats include a 22-inch (56 cm)-wide reclining chair, which converts into a fully flat bed, and an 18-inch (46 cm) TV monitor. All have leather covers tailored by Poltrona Frau. It is featured in a 1-2-1 seating style so all seats have direct aisle access.

Economy Smart Seat

Economy Smart seats feature a 17-inch (43 cm)-wide seat on the Boeing 787s and 19-inch (48 cm)-wide seat on the Airbus A380s, with a 31-to-33-inch (79 to 84 cm) pitch and 6-inch (15 cm) recline. There is also an 11-inch (28 cm) touch screen fitted with Etihad's entertainment system. It uses a 3-4-3 seating style on the Airbus A380s, and 3-3-3 seating style on the Boeing 787s.

== In-flight entertainment ==
Etihad uses both the Panasonic eX2, eX3, and the Thales TopSeries i5000 in-flight entertainment system with AVOD on its new long-range aircraft and some of its new A320-200 aircraft.

On 28 April 2019, Etihad announced that it would remove seat-back screens in the economy section of 23 of its narrow-body Airbus A320 and A321 aircraft, used for flights of up to five hours. Etihad signed a 10-year agreement with Panasonic Avionics Corporation in 2011 for the provision of in-flight entertainment including broadband internet and live TV. Atlas is the official in-flight magazine of the airline.

== Loyalty program ==
Etihad Guest is the airline's frequent flyer program, launched on 30 August 2006. It offers a discount web shop for members and multiple benefits such as extra baggage and priority check-in for frequent fliers. Points may also be redeemed for tickets or class upgrades. As part of an agreement between Etihad and the United Arab Emirates Ministry of Community Development, senior Emirati citizens get instant access to Etihad's loyalty program and are entitled to perks of more air miles, discounted tickets, priority check-in, and extra baggage.

As part of a partnership with American Airlines, American Airline loyalty program AAdvantage may be redeemed for tickets on Etihad. Similar partnership exists for the Scandinavian Airlines loyalty program Eurobonus, where members can earn and spend bonus points on selected flights. Etihad guest loyalty members are rewarded with Etihad miles when they book accommodations through booking.com as a result of a deal signed between booking.com and Etihad Airways in 2019.

Etihad Guest airline partners

- Air Canada
- Air Europa
- Air France
- Air New Zealand
- Air Serbia
- All Nippon Airways
- American Airlines
- Asiana Airlines
- Azul Brazilian Airlines
- Bangkok Airways
- Brussels Airlines
- China Eastern
- Condor
- El Al
- Ethiopian Airlines
- Garuda Indonesia
- Gulf Air
- Hainan Airlines
- Hong Kong Airlines
- JetBlue
- KLM
- Malaysia Airlines
- Oman Air
- Royal Air Maroc
- Saudia
- Scandinavian Airlines
- SriLankan Airlines
- TAP Air Portugal
- Vietnam Airlines

== Accidents and incidents ==
As of 2026, Etihad Airways has not suffered any fatal accidents during passenger operations.

- 15 November 2007 – A new A340-600, registration A6-EHG, due for delivery to Etihad Airways was damaged beyond repair during ground testing at Airbus' facilities at Toulouse Blagnac International Airport in France. During a pre-delivery engine test, multiple safety systems had been disabled by engineers, leading to the non-chocked aircraft accelerating to 31 knots (57 km/h) and colliding with a concrete blast deflection wall. Severe damage was inflicted on the aircraft and nine people on board were injured, four of them seriously. The right-wing, tail and left engines made contact with the ground or wall, leaving the forward section of the aircraft elevated several metres and the cockpit broke off.

== See also ==
- Zayed International Airport
- List of airlines of the United Arab Emirates
- List of airports in the United Arab Emirates
- Abu Dhabi Developmental Holding Company, owner of Etihad since 2023
