= Al Bandar =

Coordinates: 24°27′4.5″N 54°36′0.4″E

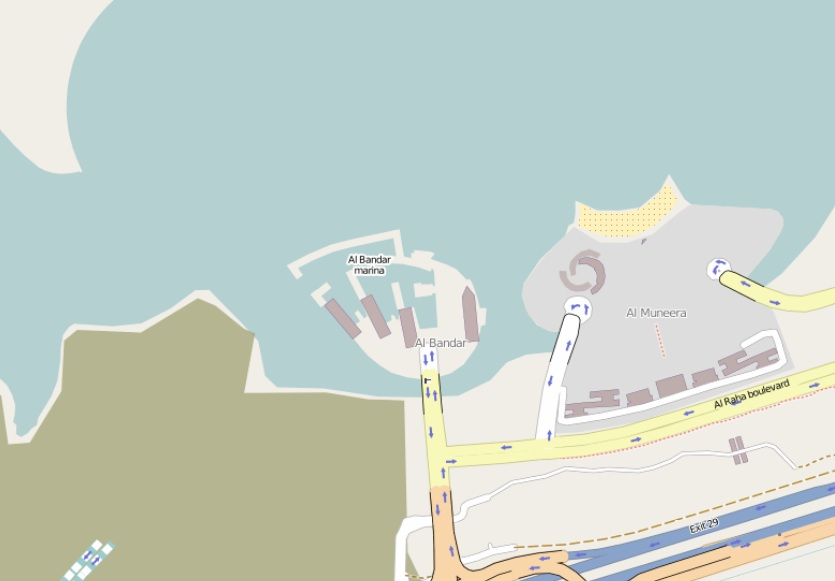
Map of the Al Bandar Community

Al Bandar is a residential and retail complex located in Abu Dhabi, the United Arab Emirates, which includes residential towers, a marina and clubhouse, as well as shopping and dining venues. It was developed and is operated by Aldar Properties.

== Geography and description ==
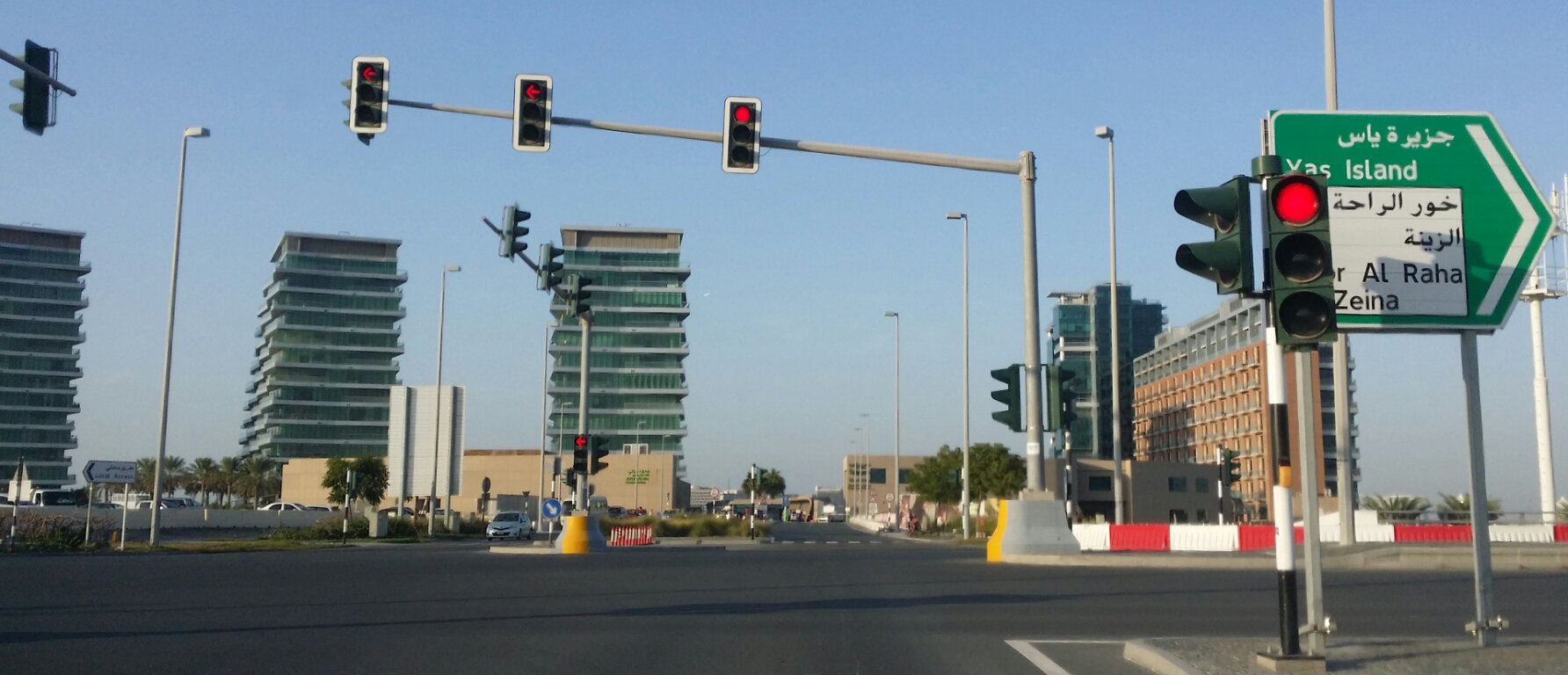
Residential towers

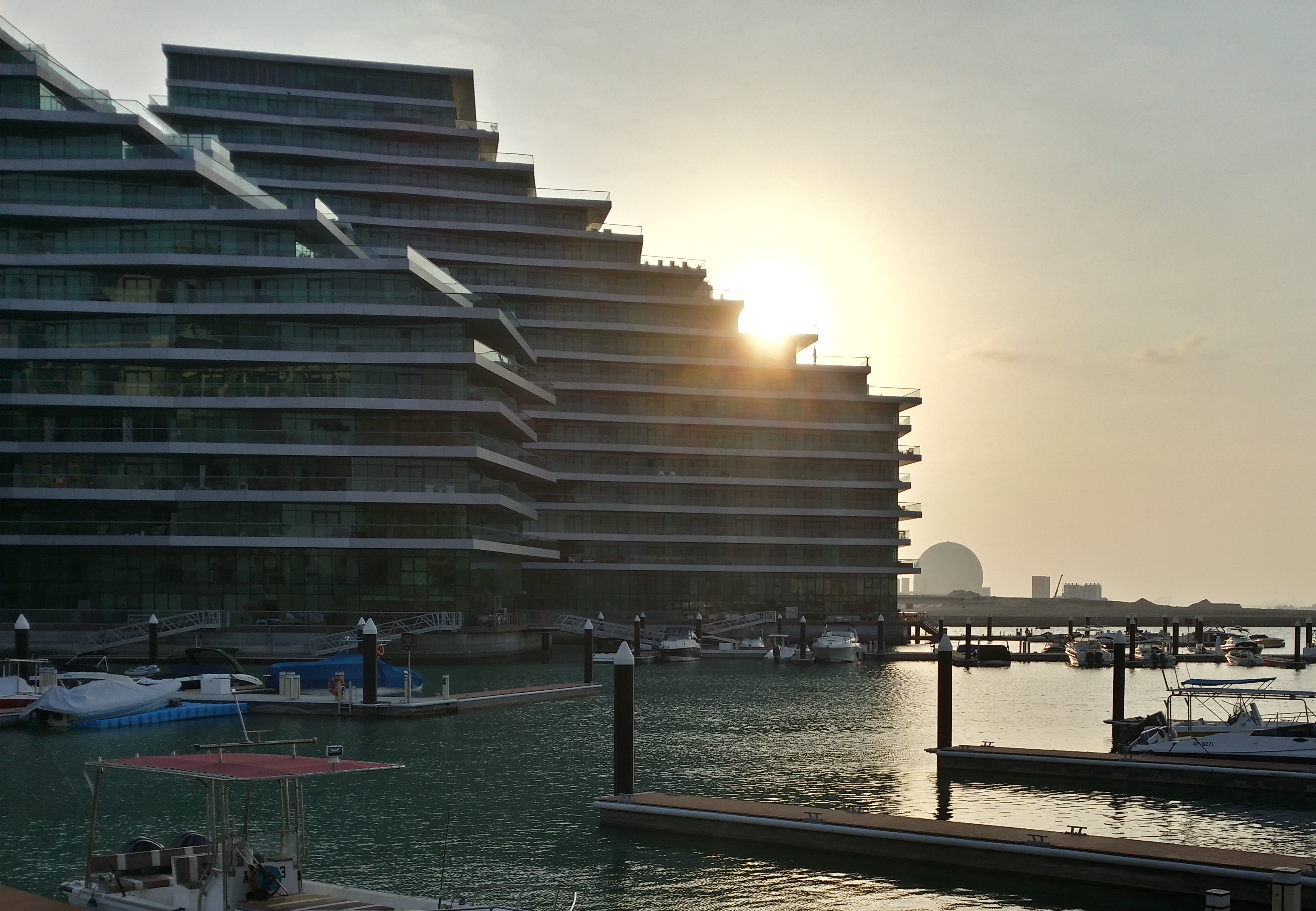
Al Bandar Marina

Al Bandar, located on the coast north of Abu Dhabi island, is the northernmost portion of Al Raha area, and part of Al Raha Beach. It is built on an artificial island which was partially created by dredging.

The residential towers include Al Naseem A, B and C (366 apartments), Al Barza (132 apartments), and Al Manara (12 apartments). Al Bandar marina has a total of 131 berths ranging in sizes from 6.5 metres to 24 metres.

Shops in the complex include a Spinneys supermarket, a health-care centre for women, a women's manicures and pedicure business, a music centre for children, and a boating equipment supplier and boat dealer. Restaurants include Afghani-Californian cuisine.
