= Aldar Headquarters building =

Aldar Headquarters
- View of the building.

General information
- Type: Commercial offices
- Location: Al Raha Beach, Abu Dhabi; United Arab Emirates
- Coordinates: 24°26′28″N 54°34′31″E
- Topped-out: 2010
- Completed: 2010
- Owner: Aldar Properties

Height
- Roof: 110 m (360 ft)

Technical details
- Floor area: 61,900 m^{2} (666,000 sq ft)

Design and construction
- Architect: MZ Architects
- Architecture firm: MZ Architects
- Main contractor: ALDAR Laing O’Rourke

The Aldar Headquarters building is the first circular building of its kind in the Middle East. It is located in Al Raha, Abu Dhabi, United Arab Emirates.

Aldar Headquarters was commissioned by Aldar Properties, one of the UAE's leading real estate development firms, and designed by MZ Architects.

Told to create a iconic structure on Al Raha Beach, Marwan Zgheib utilized classical architecture with the goal of creating a sense of place and identity for the area. He was inspired by the clam, an icon meaningful to Abu Dhabi and its seafaring heritage.

== Innovation ==
Aldar Headquarters is known for conquering engineering feats, it's constructed using a diagonal grid, which supports the untypical shape. It lessens the need for interior columns and provides a more flexible and open space within.

== Use of the Golden Section ==
The extent that the circle is embedded in the ground was designed around the golden section. Architects were able to locate the two points of stability needed with this rule, creating the perfect balance.

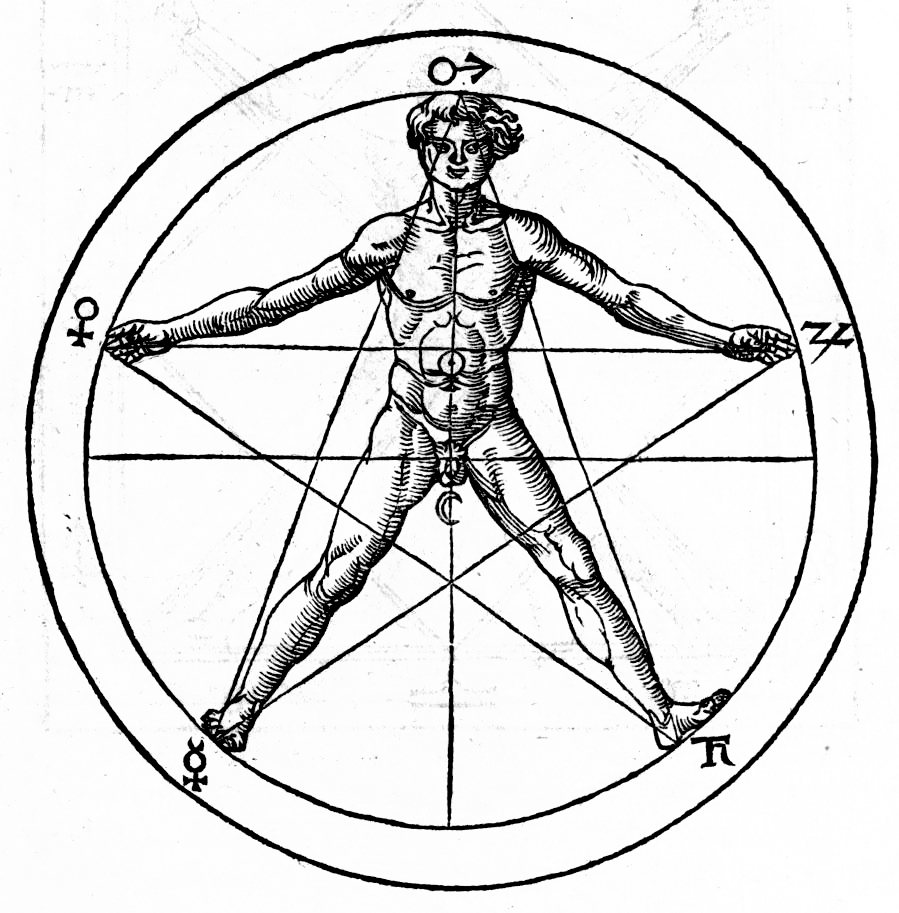
Image of a human body in a pentagram from Heinrich Cornelius Agrippa's Libri tres de occulta Philosophia. If the inner circle were the circumference of the building, the ground level would be at the base of the pentagram (at the figure's feet).
