= Abu Dhabi Tram =

Tram system under construction

Overview
- Status: Approved
- Owner: Abu Dhabi Transport Company
- Locale: Abu Dhabi, United Arab Emirates
- Termini: Yas Gateway Park; Al Raha Mall, Zayed International Airport, Etihad Plaza
- Stations: 23 (Phase 1); 15 (Phase 2); 38 (Total) (Note: All information here are based on what the map showed at Global Rail 2025. Station count MIGHT change if construction progress will be shown in Google Maps)
- Website: https://www.ad-tc.ae/

Service
- Type: Tram
- Operator(s): Abu Dhabi Transport Company
- Rolling stock: TBA
- Daily ridership: 130,000 (est.)

History
- Planned opening: 2030

Technical
- Line length: 20km (12mi) (Phase 1); 13km (8mi) (Phase 2); 33km (20mi) (Total)
- Track gauge: TBA
- Electrification: TBA
- Operating speed: 100 km/h (62 mph)

The Abu Dhabi Tram or the Line 4 Tram is a proposed tramway network by the Abu Dhabi Transport Company. The project was first announced in 2009, and was originally set to be operational by 2014, but construction never begun. In 2025, the Abu Dhabi Transport Company announced the new "Line 4," which will connect Yas Island to Al Raha, Zayed International Airport, and Etihad Plaza. The main depot of the line is located near the Etihad Airways Headquarters, with access at Al Mireef Street. Construction is expected to start by 2026, and is set to be completed by 2030.

== Construction ==
Construction will be divided into 2 phases. The first phase is the base of the project - civil construction of most of the network, starting at Yas Island, crossing to the mainland to Al Raha Mall, the airport, and Etihad Plaza. The second phase is split into 2, phase 2A and 2B. Phase 2A consists of an extension to Khalifa City from Al Raha Mall, while phase 2B will loop around Yas Island, connected at Yas Gateway Park and coming back near Yas Waterworld. Construction will begin in 2026 and will be completed by 2030.

== Network ==
A 33km network is planned, and will be built in 2 phases:

The first phase starts at Yas Gateway Park near the E12 highway. It will pass through Yas Island tourist attractions until connecting to the mainland. The line will branch off to Al Raha and Etihad Plaza, while it continues to Zayed International Airport. The total length of the first phase is 20 kilometers (12 miles).

The second phase consists of a 5.5 kilometer-extension from Al Raha to Khalifa City, and a 10.7km loop around Yas Island, passing through Disneyland Abu Dhabi and other residential areas. The whole tram network is 33 kilometers (20 miles) long. (Note: All information here are based on what the map showed at Global Rail 2025. Line length MIGHT change if construction progress will be shown in Google Maps)
