= List of Etihad Airways destinations =

Etihad Airways was established as the national airline of the United Arab Emirates in July 2003 by Royal (Amiri) Decree issued by a Sheikh Khalifa bin Zayed Al Nahyan. Services were launched with a ceremonial flight to Al Ain on 5 November 2003. On 12 November 2003, Etihad commenced commercial operations with the launch of services to Beirut. It serves 90 destinations across five of six inhabited continents as of October 2025.

== List ==
| Country | City | Airport | Notes | Refs |
|---|---|---|---|---|
| Afghanistan | Kabul | Kabul International Airport | Passenger | |
| Armenia | Yerevan | Zvartnots International Airport | Passenger | |
| Australia | Brisbane | Brisbane Airport | Terminated | |
| Australia | Melbourne | Melbourne Airport | Passenger | |
| Australia | Perth | Perth Airport | Terminated | |
| Australia | Sydney | Sydney Airport | Passenger | |
| Austria | Vienna | Vienna International Airport | Passenger | |
| Azerbaijan | Baku | Heydar Aliyev International Airport | Passenger | |
| Bahrain | Manama | Bahrain International Airport | Passenger | |
| Bangladesh | Dhaka | Hazrat Shahjalal International Airport | Seasonal | |
| Belgium | Brussels | Brussels Airport | Passenger | |
| Brazil | São Paulo | São Paulo/Guarulhos International Airport | Resuming summer 2026 | |
| Cambodia | Phnom Penh | Techo International Airport | Passenger | |
| Canada | Calgary | Calgary International Airport | Passenger | |
| Canada | Toronto | Toronto Pearson International Airport | Passenger + cargo | |
| China | Beijing | Beijing Capital International Airport | Cargo | |
| China | Beijing | Beijing Daxing International Airport | Passenger | |
| China | Chengdu | Chengdu Shuangliu International Airport | Terminated | |
| China | Chengdu | Chengdu Tianfu International Airport | Begins 5 March 2027 | |
| China | Ezhou | Ezhou Huahu International Airport | Cargo | |
| China | Guangzhou | Guangzhou Baiyun International Airport | Cargo; Passenger service begins 4 March 2027 | |
| China | Hangzhou | Hangzhou Xiaoshan International Airport | Begins 4 March 2027 | |
| China | Shanghai | Shanghai Pudong International Airport | Passenger + cargo | |
| China | Shenzhen | Shenzhen Bao'an International Airport | Begins 7 March 2027 | |
| Czech Republic | Prague | Václav Havel Airport Prague | Passenger | |
| Democratic Republic of the Congo | Kinshasa | N'djili Airport | Begins 18 March 2027 | |
| Democratic Republic of the Congo | Lubumbashi | Lubumbashi International Airport | Begins 24 March 2027 | |
| Denmark | Copenhagen | Copenhagen Airport | Passenger | |
| Egypt | Alexandria | Borg El Arab International Airport | Terminated | |
| Egypt | Cairo | Cairo International Airport | Passenger | |
| Egypt | El Alamein | El Alamein International Airport | Seasonal | |
| Eritrea | Asmara | Asmara International Airport | Begins 7 November 2026 | |
| Ethiopia | Addis Ababa | Addis Ababa Bole International Airport | Passenger | |
| France | Nice | Nice Côte d'Azur Airport | Seasonal | |
| France | Paris | Charles de Gaulle Airport | Passenger + cargo | |
| Georgia | Tbilisi | Tbilisi International Airport | Passenger | |
| Germany | Düsseldorf | Düsseldorf Airport | Passenger | |
| Germany | Frankfurt | Frankfurt Airport | Passenger + cargo | |
| Germany | Munich | Munich Airport | Passenger | |
| Ghana | Accra | Accra International Airport | Begins 17 March 2027 | |
| Greece | Athens | Athens International Airport | Passenger | |
| Greece | Mykonos | Mykonos Airport | Seasonal | |
| Greece | Santorini | Santorini (Thira) International Airport | Seasonal | |
| Hong Kong | Hong Kong | Hong Kong International Airport | Passenger + cargo | |
| India | Ahmedabad | Ahmedabad Airport | Passenger | |
| India | Bengaluru | Kempegowda International Airport | Passenger | |
| India | Chennai | Chennai International Airport | Passenger | |
| India | Delhi | Indira Gandhi International Airport | Passenger | |
| India | Hyderabad | Rajiv Gandhi International Airport | Passenger | |
| India | Jaipur | Jaipur International Airport | Passenger | |
| India | Kochi | Cochin International Airport | Passenger | |
| India | Kolkata | Netaji Subhas Chandra Bose International Airport | Passenger | |
| India | Kozhikode | Calicut International Airport | Passenger | |
| India | Mumbai | Chhatrapati Shivaji Maharaj International Airport | Passenger | |
| India | Thiruvananthapuram | Thiruvananthapuram International Airport | Passenger | |
| Indonesia | Denpasar | Ngurah Rai International Airport | Passenger | |
| Indonesia | Jakarta | Soekarno–Hatta International Airport | Passenger | |
| Indonesia | Medan | Kualanamu International Airport | Passenger | |
| Iran | Tehran | Imam Khomeini International Airport | Terminated | |
| Iraq | Erbil | Erbil International Airport | Suspended | |
| Ireland | Dublin | Dublin Airport | Passenger | |
| Israel | Tel Aviv | Ben Gurion Airport | Passenger | |
| Italy | Milan | Milan Malpensa Airport | Passenger | |
| Italy | Rome | Rome Fiumicino Airport | Passenger | |
| Italy | Venice | Venice Marco Polo Airport | Terminated | |
| Japan | Osaka | Kansai International Airport | Passenger | |
| Japan | Tokyo | Narita International Airport | Passenger | |
| Jordan | Amman | Queen Alia International Airport | Passenger | |
| Kazakhstan | Almaty | Almaty International Airport | Passenger | |
| Kazakhstan | Astana | Nursultan Nazarbayev International Airport | Terminated | |
| Kenya | Nairobi | Jomo Kenyatta International Airport | Passenger + cargo | |
| Kuwait | Kuwait City | Kuwait International Airport | Passenger | |
| Lebanon | Beirut | Beirut–Rafic Hariri International Airport | Passenger | |
| Libya | Benghazi | Benina International Airport | Terminated | |
| Libya | Tripoli | Tripoli International Airport | Airport closed | |
| Luxembourg | Luxembourg City | Luxembourg Airport | Passenger | |
| Malaysia | Kuala Lumpur | Kuala Lumpur International Airport | Passenger | |
| Maldives | Malé | Velana International Airport | Passenger | |
| Morocco | Casablanca | Mohammed V International Airport | Passenger | |
| Morocco | Rabat | Rabat–Salé Airport | Terminated | |
| Myanmar | Yangon | Yangon International Airport | Terminated | |
| Nepal | Kathmandu | Tribhuvan International Airport | Terminated | |
| Netherlands | Amsterdam | Amsterdam Airport Schiphol | Passenger + cargo | |
| Nigeria | Lagos | Murtala Muhammed International Airport | Resumes 18 March 2027 | |
| Oman | Muscat | Muscat International Airport | Passenger | |
| Oman | Salalah | Salalah International Airport | Seasonal | |
| Pakistan | Islamabad | Islamabad International Airport | Passenger | |
| Pakistan | Karachi | Jinnah International Airport | Passenger | |
| Pakistan | Lahore | Allama Iqbal International Airport | Passenger | |
| Pakistan | Peshawar | Bacha Khan International Airport | Passenger | |
| Philippines | Manila | Ninoy Aquino International Airport | Passenger | |
| Poland | Kraków | Kraków John Paul II International Airport | Seasonal | |
| Poland | Warsaw | Warsaw Chopin Airport | Passenger | |
| Portugal | Lisbon | Lisbon Airport | Passenger | |
| Qatar | Doha | Hamad International Airport | Passenger | |
| Réunion | Saint-Denis | Roland Garros Airport | Terminated | |
| Romania | Bucharest | Bucharest Henri Coandă International Airport | Passenger | |
| Russia | Moscow | Moscow Domodedovo Airport | Terminated | |
| Russia | Moscow | Sheremetyevo International Airport | Passenger | |
| Russia | Kazan | Kazan International Airport | Seasonal | |
| Russia | Saint Petersburg | Pulkovo Airport | Seasonal | |
| Russia | Sochi | Adler-Sochi International Airport | Passenger | |
| Saudi Arabia | Buraydah | Prince Naif bin Abdulaziz International Airport | Passenger | |
| Saudi Arabia | Dammam | King Fahd International Airport | Passenger | |
| Saudi Arabia | Jeddah | King Abdulaziz International Airport | Passenger | |
| Saudi Arabia | Medina | Prince Mohammad bin Abdulaziz International Airport | Passenger | |
| Saudi Arabia | Riyadh | King Khalid International Airport | Passenger + cargo | |
| Seychelles | Mahé | Seychelles International Airport | Passenger | |
| Singapore | Singapore | Changi Airport | Passenger | |
| South Africa | Cape Town | Cape Town International Airport | Terminated | |
| South Africa | Johannesburg | O. R. Tambo International Airport | Passenger + cargo | |
| South Korea | Seoul | Incheon International Airport | Passenger | |
| Spain | Barcelona | Josep Tarradellas Barcelona–El Prat Airport | Passenger | |
| Spain | Madrid | Madrid–Barajas Airport | Passenger + cargo | |
| Spain | Málaga | Málaga Airport | Seasonal | |
| Spain | Palma de Mallorca | Palma de Mallorca Airport | Seasonal | |
| Sri Lanka | Colombo | Bandaranaike International Airport | Passenger | |
| Switzerland | Geneva | Geneva Airport | Passenger | |
| Switzerland | Zurich | Zurich Airport | Passenger | |
| Syria | Damascus | Damascus International Airport | Passenger | |
| Taiwan | Taipei | Taoyuan International Airport | Passenger | |
| Tanzania | Dar es Salaam | Julius Nyerere International Airport | Terminated | |
| Tanzania | Zanzibar | Abeid Amani Karume International Airport | Seasonal | |
| Thailand | Bangkok | Suvarnabhumi International Airport | Passenger | |
| Thailand | Chiang Mai | Chiang Mai International Airport | Passenger | |
| Thailand | Krabi | Krabi International Airport | Passenger | |
| Thailand | Phuket | Phuket International Airport | Passenger | |
| Tunisia | Tunis | Tunis–Carthage International Airport | Passenger | |
| Turkey | Antalya | Antalya Airport | Seasonal | |
| Turkey | Istanbul | Istanbul Airport | Passenger | |
| Uganda | Entebbe | Entebbe International Airport | Terminated | |
| United Arab Emirates | Abu Dhabi | Zayed International Airport | Hub | |
| United Arab Emirates | Al Ain | Al Ain International Airport | Seasonal | |
| United Kingdom | Edinburgh | Edinburgh Airport | Terminated | |
| United Kingdom | London | Gatwick Airport | Terminated | |
| United Kingdom | London | Heathrow Airport | Passenger | |
| United Kingdom | Manchester | Manchester Airport | Passenger | |
| United States | Atlanta | Hartsfield–Jackson Atlanta International Airport | Passenger | |
| United States | Boston | Logan International Airport | Passenger + cargo | |
| United States | Charlotte | Charlotte Douglas International Airport | Passenger | |
| United States | Chicago | O'Hare International Airport | Passenger + cargo | |
| United States | Dallas/Fort Worth | Dallas Fort Worth International Airport | Terminated | |
| United States | Houston | George Bush Intercontinental Airport | Terminated | |
| United States | Los Angeles | Los Angeles International Airport | Terminated | |
| United States | Miami | Miami International Airport | Cargo | |
| United States | New York City | John F. Kennedy International Airport | Passenger + cargo | |
| United States | San Francisco | San Francisco International Airport | Terminated | |
| United States | Washington, D.C. | Dulles International Airport | Passenger + cargo | |
| Uzbekistan | Tashkent | Tashkent International Airport | Passenger | |
| Vietnam | Hanoi | Noi Bai International Airport | Passenger + cargo | |
| Vietnam | Ho Chi Minh City | Tan Son Nhat International Airport | Terminated | |
| Yemen | Sanaa | Sanaa International Airport | Terminated | |
| Zimbabwe | Harare | Robert Gabriel Mugabe International Airport | Begins 24 March 2027 | |
