= Abu Dhabi Metro =

Planned rapid transit system in Abu Dhabi, United Arab Emirates

Overview
- Locale: Abu Dhabi
- Transit type: Rapid transit
- Number of lines: 4
System map
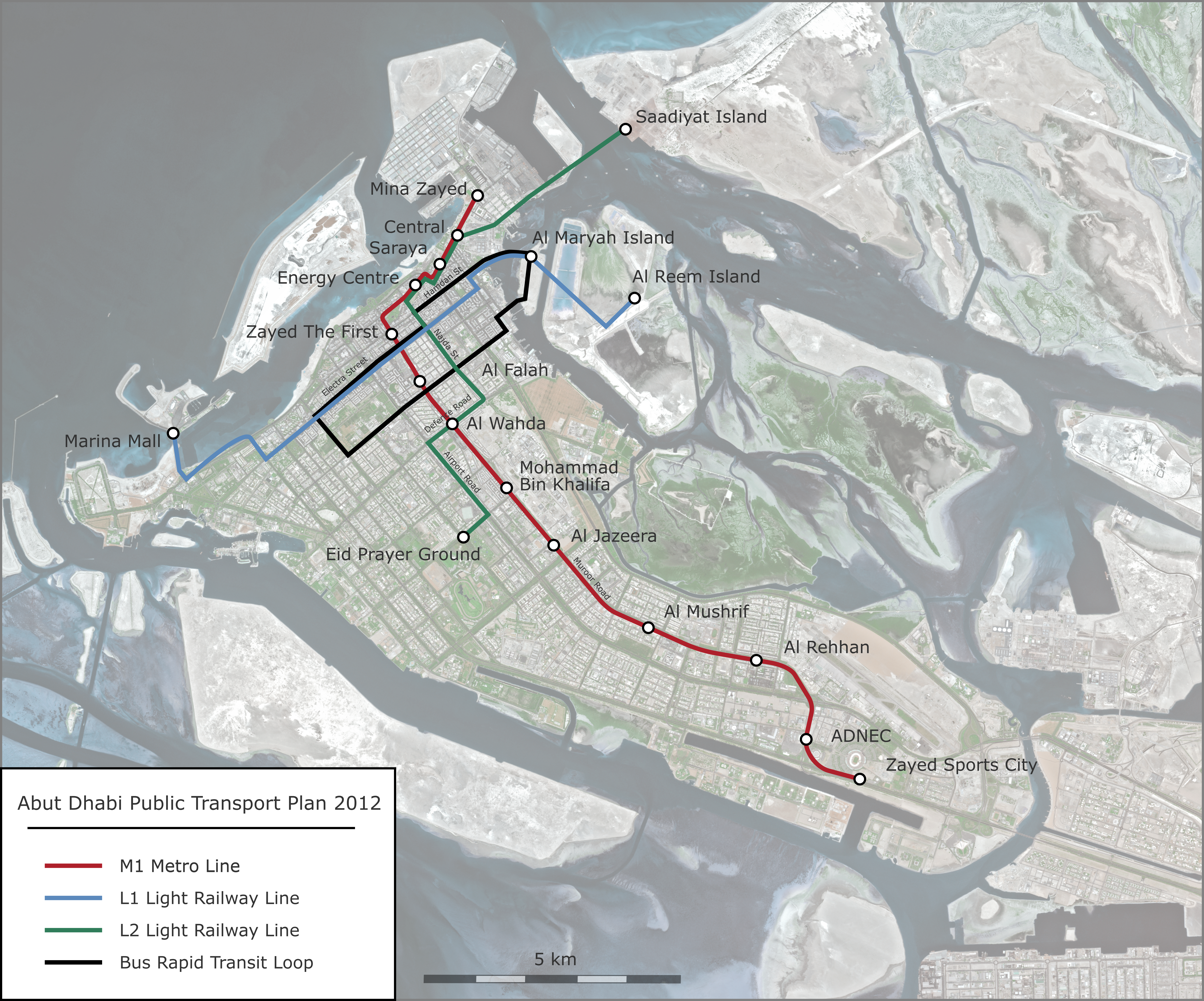

Abu Dhabi Metro is a planned metro system that would be part of a larger transit network for the city of Abu Dhabi, United Arab Emirates. First announced in 2008, as of 2024 construction has started but the completion date is unknown.

== Plan ==
The entire transit network will be 131 km long when complete, including an 18-kilometre (11 mi) partially underground metro line, two light rail lines and bus rapid transit. (Note: Some recent online discussions mention a monorail, but it does NOT seem to part of the most recent plan. There was a monorail under discussion in 2006. See: "Monorail News Briefs". Archived from the original on 2013-05-04.) It is expected to cost Dh7 billion.

Phase 1 of the network, with a length of 60 kilometres (37 mi), was intended to be completed by 2020, with a further 70 kilometres (43 mi) in later phases. However, as of August 2024, no contracts have been signed and no construction has started.

The system will be composed of four basic lines:

- Line L1 18 kilometres (11 mi) heavy rail rapid transit of which 5 kilometres (3.1 mi) will be underground
- Line L2 15 kilometres (9.3 mi) light rail with 24 stops
- Line L3 13 kilometres (8.1 mi) light rail with 21 stops
- Line L4 14 kilometres (8.7 mi) bus rapid transit loop with 25 stops

The metro will mainly connect the proposed Central Business District with Sowwah Island, Reem Island, Saadiyat Island, Yas Island, Zayed International Airport, Sheikh Zayed Grand Mosque, Masdar City, Capital City District, Emerald Gateway, Zayed Sports City and ADNEC.

== Construction ==
Firms interested in bidding for contracts on phase 1 of the project were due to submit statements of intent to the government by mid June 2013.

The Department of Transport has planned phase 1 for construction in three contracts:

1. civil works for the above-ground structures (design and build contracts.
2. underground construction work (design and build contracts.
3. the rail system, the rolling stock and the operation and maintenance for the line; (design, build, operate and maintain contracts.)

From October 2016, the project halted. In August 2018, the Abu Dhabi Department of Transport invited bids for consultancy services for the emirate's metro and light rail projects completed in 2033.

In 2026, Abu Dhabi announced a four-year transport program extending through 2030, with Dh170 billion allocated to transport and road infrastructure. The program includes further development of the proposed Abu Dhabi Metro, as well as other projects like the Abu Dhabi Tram, which will connect Zayed International Airport with Yas Island, Al Raha and Khalifa City.
