= Aldar Properties =

Real estate development, management and investment company

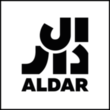
- Native name: شركة الدار العقارية
- Type: Public
- Industry: Real estate
- Founded: 12 January 2004; 22 years ago
- Headquarters: Abu Dhabi, UAE
- Area served: Abu Dhabi
- Key people: Mohammed Al Mubarak (Chairman); Talal Al Dhiyebi (CEO); Jassem Busaibe (CIO)
- Revenue: AED 8.58 billion (2021)
- Net income: AED 2.33 billion (2021)
- Total assets: AED 41.1 billion (2021)
- Total equity: AED 40 billion (2020)
- Number of employees: 500
- Website: www.aldar.com

Aldar Properties PJSC (Arabic: شركة الدار العقارية Sharikah al-Dār al-`Iqāriyyah) is a real estate development company owned by the Abu Dhabi government and with headquarters in Abu Dhabi, United Arab Emirates. The company's shares are traded on the Abu Dhabi Securities Exchange. The largest shareholder of Aldar is Mubadala, the UAE sovereign wealth fund.

Aldar's projects within the Abu Dhabi Emirate include Al Raha Beach, Al Raha Gardens, the Abu Dhabi Central Market (Souq) and Al Mamoura, as well as Yas Island which includes the Yas Marina Circuit, Ferrari World and Yas Hotel Abu Dhabi.

Al Fahid Island, owned by Aldar Properties, is being transformed into a tourist destination.

== History ==
Aldar was founded on 12 January 2004, with the shares listing in 2005.

In Astana, Kazakhstan, Aldar was a partner in the development of the Palace of Peace and Reconciliation and the Khan Shatyr Entertainment Center.

The company's credit rating was downgraded to "junk" in 2010. The company received a $5.2 billion bailout from the Abu Dhabi government in 2011. In 2012, Reuters reported on suspicious stock exchange patterns during the announcement of a state-backed merger of Aldar and Sorouh Real Estate. In 2013, the company merged with Sorouh Real Estate. The combined entity continues to operate under the Aldar name.

In December 2017, Aldar acquired the International Tower in Abu Dhabi. In March 2018, Aldar announced a partnership with Dubai-based property developer Emaar. In 2023, Aldar partnered with Dubai Holding to develop projects in Dubai.

In December 2023, Aldar Properties announced it had acquired London Square, a UK property developer, for £230m (AED 1.07bn).

Aldar Properties was ranked 30th on Forbes Middle East's Top 100 Listed Companies 2025 list.

== See also ==
- Eagle Hills Properties
- Emaar Developments
- Union Properties PJSC
