= Al Fahid Island =

Island off UAE

Coordinates: 24°30′36″N 54°32′57″E

Fahid Island is a natural island located in the Persian Gulf, just off the coast of Abu Dhabi, United Arab Emirates.

The island currently houses an Aldar Properties sales center and Fahid Beach Club by Barbossa, open to the public. It is a 3.4 million square metre mixed-purpose community with both residential, retail and commercial units, located between Yas Island and Saadiyat Island.
