= Khalifa City =

Suburb of Abu Dhabi, United Arab Emirates

Coordinates: 24.455744°N 54.626169°E

The head office of Etihad Airways.

Khalifa City is a residential suburb located in the Emirate of Abu Dhabi in the United Arab Emirates. It is popular among renters.

== Subdivisions ==
Khalifa City was subdivided into three areas: Khalifa City A, Khalifa City B, and New Khalifa City. They have since been renamed to Khalifa City, Shakhbout City, and Zayed City respectively. All of these are currently being developed into what will become three major new districts of Abu Dhabi.

=== Khalifa City ===
Khalifa City A is on the main highway to Dubai, about 25 kilometres from Abu Dhabi, and is close to Abu Dhabi International Airport and Yas Island. Etihad Airways has its head office in Khalifa City A. Khalifa City A, which already has around 600-700 houses, will be adjacent to the prestigious Al Raha Beach project. This project will include residential and commercial units, as well as many international hotels. The project is being built by Aldar properties. Emirates ID have their HQ here.

Khalifa City is a suburb in the city of Abu Dhabi, which is the capital of the United Arab Emirates (UAE). It is located about 30 kilometers southeast of the city center and is part of the larger Khalifa City complex, which includes several residential areas such as Khalifa City A, B, C, and D.

Khalifa City was originally developed as a residential area for Emirati families, and it has grown into a thriving community with a population of over 100,000 people. The area is known for its spacious villas, modern apartment buildings, and green spaces. It is also home to several international schools, making it a popular choice for expat families.

One of the main attractions in Khalifa City is the Khalifa City A Park, which features a jogging track, basketball and volleyball courts, and a children's playground. The area also has several shopping malls, including the Forsan Central Mall and the Etihad Plaza Mall, which offer a variety of retail and dining options.

Khalifa City is well connected to the rest of Abu Dhabi, with easy access to major highways such as Sheikh Zayed Road and the Abu Dhabi-Dubai Highway. It is also close to the Abu Dhabi International Airport, making it a convenient location for travelers.

Khalifa City is a modern and family-friendly community with access to amenities and attractions.

=== Shakhbout City ===
Shakhbout City is further inland and is near Bani Yas and Al Shawamekh.

Formerly known as Khalifa City B.

=== Zayed City ===
The new Zayed City is planned to be between Khalifa City and Shakhbout City. It is also known as the Capital District, and is planned to be the new city center of Abu Dhabi.
