= Al Raha =

Area in Abu Dhabi, UAE

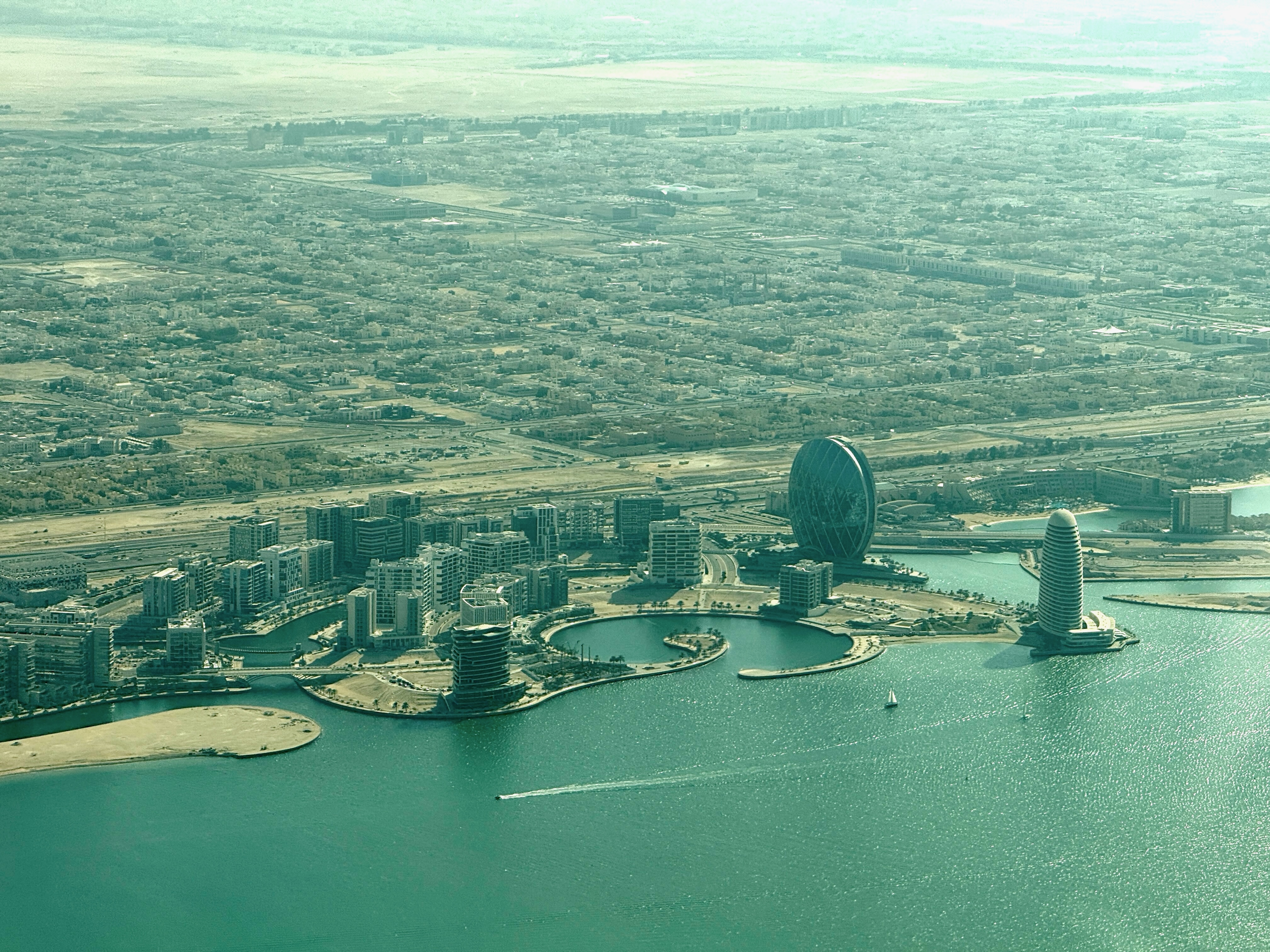
Al Raha Beach, Abu Dhabi

Al Raha is a mixed commercial, residential, and leisure area in Abu Dhabi, the United Arab Emirates, located primarily in Khalifa City A. The area is situated between Umm Al-Nar and Abu Dhabi International Airport. Al Raha includes two primary sections, Al Raha Beach and Al Raha Gardens, featuring eleven sub-precincts: Al Zeina, Khor Al Raha, Al Bandar, Al Seef, Al Dana, Al Rumaila, Al Zahiya, Al Lissayli, Al Shaleela, Al Razeen, and Al Thurayya. Spread over an area of 5.2 million square metres, Al Raha Beach can accommodate 120,000 residents.

== Beach ==
Al Raha Beach is located on a beach along the highway to Dubai, neighboring Abu Dhabi International Airport, Khalifa City and Yas Island. It is 5.2 million square meters large and planned for 120.000 residents in over 3000 properties. Among the commercial buildings are the developer's headquarters. Flagship communities are Al Bandar, Al Hadeel, Al Muneera and Al Zeina. But the beach has not been opened to the public since construction.
