= Liza Donnelly =

American cartoonist and writer

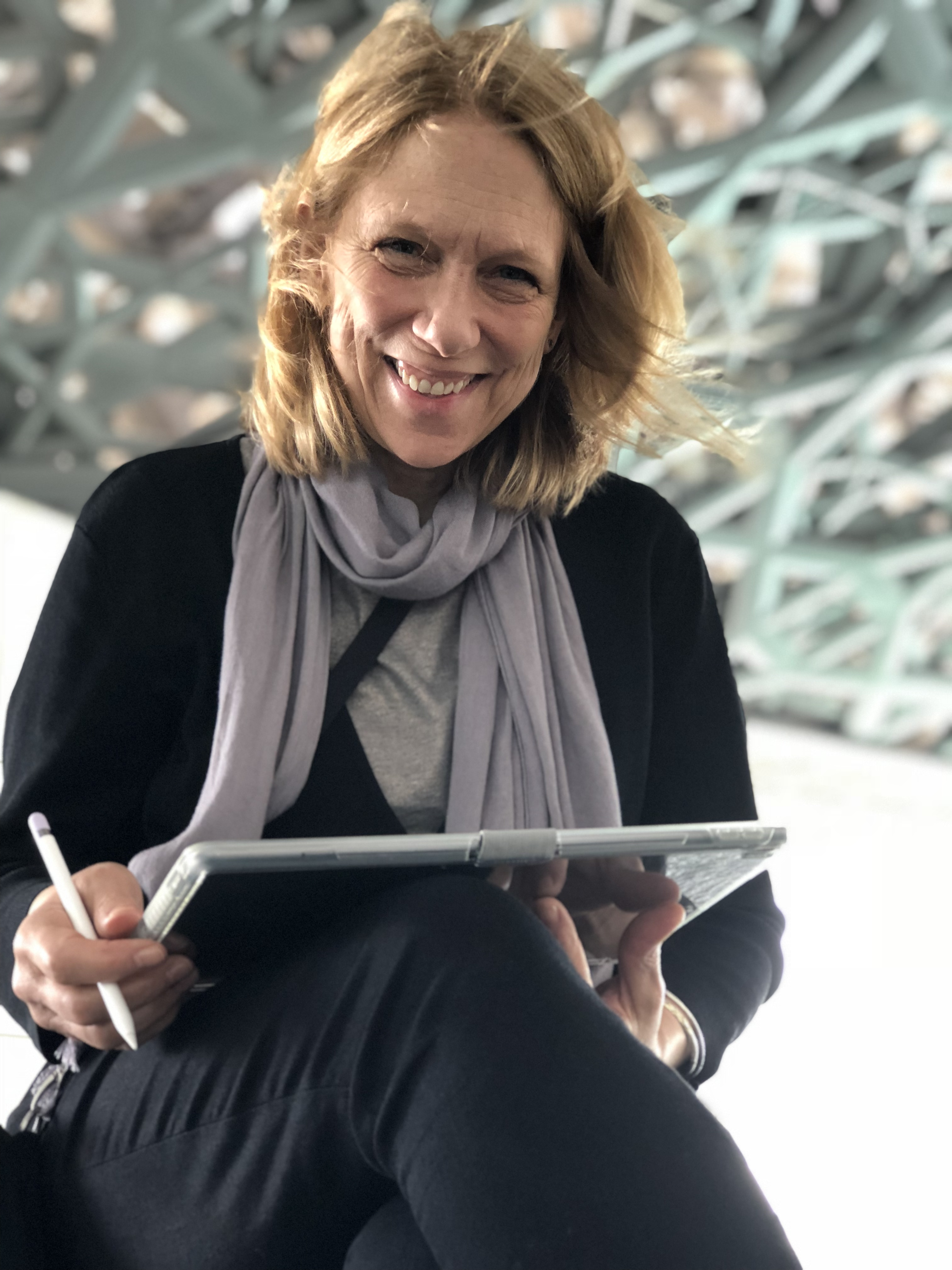
- Donnelly drawing at the Louvre Abu Dhabi in 2018
- Spouse: Michael Maslin
- Writing career
- Genre: Cartoon
- Website: lizadonnelly.com

Liza Donnelly is an American cartoonist and writer, best known for her work in The New Yorker and is resident cartoonist of CBS News. Donnelly is the creator of digital live drawing, a new form of journalism wherein she draws using a tablet, and shares impressions and visual reports of events and news instantly on social media. She has drawn this way for numerous media outlets, including CBS News, The New Yorker, Fusion, NBC and covered live the Oscars, Democratic National Convention, the 2017 Presidential Inauguration, among others. She writes a regular column for Medium on politics and global women's rights; Donnelly is the author of eighteen books.

== Career ==
She sold her first cartoon to The New Yorker in 1979, and they began to appear regularly in that magazine in 1982, at which time she was the youngest, and one of only four women cartoonists at the magazine. Donnelly's work has appeared in many other national publications, including The New York Times, The Harvard Business Review, The Nation, Audubon, Ms. Magazine, Glamour, Good Housekeeping, Cosmopolitan, National Lampoon, American Photographer, Scholastic News, Cobblestone, and Habitat.

Online publications that have published Donnelly's work include Medium, Politico, The Daily Beast, Open Salon, The New Yorker, CNN, Forbes, The Huffington Post, and Women's eNews. She is the creator and editor of World Ink.

She has been on the faculty at Vassar College, where she taught Cartoons in American Culture and Women’s Studies. A self-described feminist, in her book, Very Funny Ladies: The New Yorker's Women Cartoonists, Donnelly chronicles the history of women New Yorker cartoonists. David Remnick, senior editor of The New Yorker contributed a foreword with cartoon editor Emma Allen. In Sex & Sensibility, which Donnelly edited, cartoons from ten female cartoonists explore the female perspective on love and sex.

Donnelly is also an experienced public speaker. Shortly after the Jyllands-Posten Muhammad cartoons controversy, she spoke at the United Nations on behalf of Cartooning For Peace. She also spoke at the first TED Women conference.

She has curated numerous exhibitions, among them an exhibition of cartoons about women's rights at the annual conference of Women Deliver.

In 2012, Donnelly visited Israel and Palestine as a cultural envoy of the US State Department to discuss the political impact of cartoons, international women cartoonists and how cartoons can be used for peace. She is frequently invited to speak abroad, and has been honored by awards in Spain, France and Italy.

Donnelly's book Cartoon Marriage, written with her husband, was optioned by Jennifer Garner's production company, Vandalia Films. The script was written by Lizzie McGuire creator Terri Minsky. Donnelly's book Women On Men was a 2014 finalist for the Thurber Prize for American humor.

In October, 2016, Liza was hired by CBSNews to be their "resident cartoonist," drawing and appearing on CBS This Morning and special events. Liza is a pioneer of live drawing on a digital tablet and sharing immediately on social media. Her live drawing has been published on newyorker.com, CBS.com, Medium, NBC.com, Fusion.com, and she has attended the Oscars since 2016, and the 2016 Tonys and Grammys to live draw.

== Early life and education ==
Liza Donnelly was born in Washington DC. She learned to draw by tracing over other artists, and aspired to have work in The New Yorker from a young age. She is a graduate of Sidwell Friends School and Earlham College, and has taken cartooning classes at the School of Visual Arts and Parsons School of Design.

In May, 2014 received an honorary doctorate from The University of Connecticut, where she also delivered the commencement address to the UCONN Graduate School.

== Personal life ==
Donnelly is married to fellow New Yorker cartoonist Michael Maslin. They have two daughters.

=== Solo shows ===
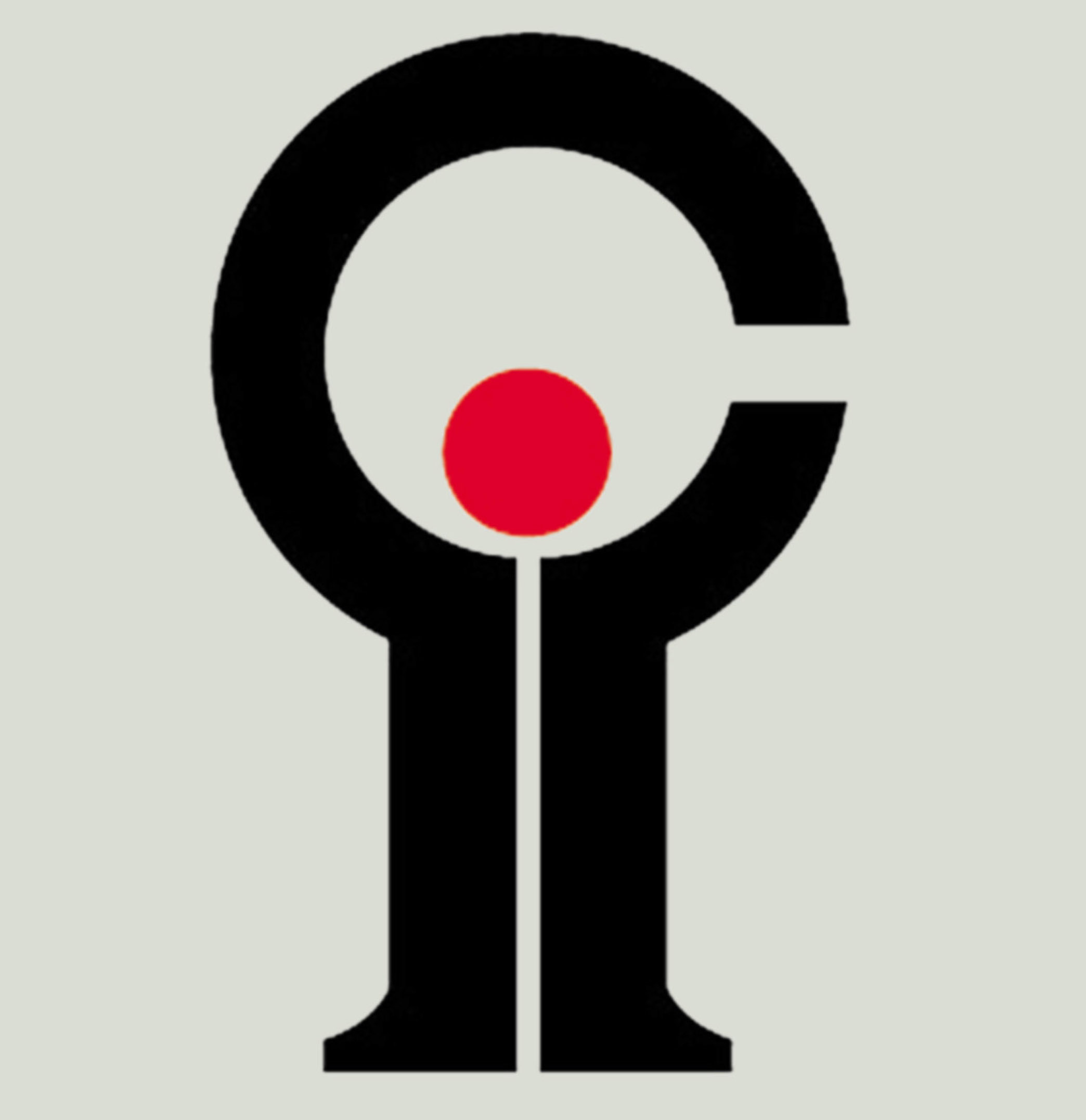
Logo of IIC

Liza Donnelly's work has appeared in a few solo shows. At Earlham college in Richmond, Indiana; at the Cartoon Museum in Holon, Israel; at the Museum of Cartoon and Comic Art in New York City. In 2018, the Indian Institute of Cartoonists organized a solo exhibition of her work at the Indian Cartoon Gallery, Bangalore (April 7–28, 2018)

In 2020, the Norman Rockwell Museum in Massachusetts assembled a solo exhibition, "Liza Donnelly: Comic Relief."

== Bibliography ==
- Dinosaur Day, Scholastic Trade (January 1987), ISBN 0-590-41800-9.
- Dinosaurs' Halloween, Scholastic Trade (October 1988), ISBN 0-590-41006-7.
- Dinousaur Garden, Scholastic (February 1991), ISBN 0-590-43172-2.
- Dinosaur Beach, Scholastic (June 1991), ISBN 0-590-42176-X.
- Mothers and Daughters, Random House (April 1993), ISBN 9780345383617
- Dinosaur Christmas, Scholastic Inc. (October 1, 1994), ISBN 0-590-44798-X.
- Dinosaur Valentine, Scholastic (January 1994), ISBN 0-590-46415-9.
- Fathers and Sons: It's a Funny Relationship! (with Michael Maslin), Random House (May, 1994), ISBN 978-0-345-38676-2.
- Dinosaurs' Thanksgiving, Scholastic (October 1995), ISBN 0-590-22195-7.
- Husbands And Wives (with Michael Maslin), Random House (1995), ISBN 978-0-345-39041-7.
- "Leading Ladies," The New Yorker, Nov. 11, 2002, pp. 164–165.
- Funny Ladies: The New Yorker's Greatest Women Cartoonists And Their Cartoons, Prometheus Books; illustrated edition (October 3, 2005), ISBN 1-59102-344-0, ISBN 978-1-59102-344-9.
- Sex and Sensibility: Ten Women Examine the Lunacy of Modern Love...in 200 Cartoons (editor), Twelve (April 2, 2008), ISBN 0-446-19815-3, ISBN 978-0-446-19815-8.
- Cartoon Marriage: Adventures in Love and Matrimony by The New Yorker's Cartooning Couple (with Michael Maslin), Random House (January 27, 2009), ISBN 1-4000-6808-8, ISBN 978-1-4000-6808-1.
- When Do They Serve the Wine?: The Folly, Flexibility, and Fun of Being a Woman, Chronicle Books (September 29, 2010), ISBN 0-8118-7116-9.
- Women On Men Narrative Library (November 2013), ASIN B00GVABUL6
- The End of the Rainbow, Holiday House (February 2016), ISBN 9780823432912
- A Hippo in Our Yard, Holiday House (February 2016), ISBN 9780823435647
