= Natural History Museum Abu Dhabi =

Museum in the United Arab Emirates

- متحف التاريخ الطبيعي أبوظبي
- Established: 22 November 2025; 9 months ago
- Location: Saadiyat Island; Abu Dhabi, United Arab Emirates
- Coordinates: 24.528601°N 54.403516°E
- Type: Natural history museum
- Founder: Abu Dhabi Department of Culture and Tourism
- Director: Dr. Peter Kjærgaard
- Website: nhmad.ae

The Natural History Museum Abu Dhabi (Arabic: متحف التاريخ الطبيعي أبوظبي) is a natural history museum located in the Saadiyat Cultural District of Abu Dhabi, United Arab Emirates. It is the largest natural history institution in the Middle East, covering the history of the universe and Earth over 13.8 billion years, and focusing particularly on the natural history of the Arabian Peninsula.

== History ==
The museum was conceived and developed by the Abu Dhabi Department of Culture and Tourism in partnership with Miral Group. The project was officially launched in March 2022. It is established not only as a public attraction but also as a scientific research, teaching institution, and educational resource. The museum officially opened its doors to the public on November 22, 2025.

For its opening, New Zealand-based studio Wētā Workshop produced more than 300 models and dioramas for the museum. Designed to illustrate natural history and prehistoric life, these educational fabrications span from small-scale fauna to large museum features, including a 15-metre-long Shastasaurus.

The Dutch architectural firm Mecanoo designed the museum's 35,000 square meter structure, which is a central part of the Saadiyat Cultural District on Saadiyat Island alongside the Louvre Abu Dhabi, the Zayed National Museum, and Guggenheim Abu Dhabi.

== Collections and exhibits ==
The museum's exhibition structure presents a continuous narrative tracing history from the Big Bang to projections for the future of the planet. While the collection includes exhibits of global significance, it emphasizes the geological past, prehistoric fauna, and unique ecosystems of the Arabian Peninsula.

=== Permanent highlights ===
The museum houses several noteworthy and rare specimens:

Stan the T. rex: A near-complete skeleton of a Tyrannosaurus rex, one of the best-preserved and most intact dinosaur specimens discovered, estimated to be 67 million years old. This specimen was acquired at auction for a reported sum of $31.8 million (approximately AED 117 million).

Murchison meteorite: A fragment of the Murchison meteorite, which fell in Australia in 1969. This specimen is approximately 7 billion years old and contains pre-solar grains and organic stardust compounds, offering insight into the early solar system.

Blue whale skeleton: A 25-meter skeleton of a female blue whale (Balaenoptera musculus).

Dinosaur displays: The main atrium features a world-first display of five towering sauropods arranged in a dynamic, lifelike formation. Another notable display features two Tyrannosauruses battling over a Triceratops.

Arabian palaeontology: Exhibits showcase local discoveries, including life-size models of animals that once inhabited the emirate, such as the extinct species of elephant known as Stegotetrabelodon.

=== Galleries ===
The main galleries are organized thematically to explore Earth's history, covering major themes such as The Story of Earth, The Evolving World, Our World, Resilient Planet, and Earth's Future. In addition to these primary sections, the museum features specialized side galleries. These include The PalaeoLab, The Life Sciences Lab, a focus on Arabia's Climate, and The Human Story exhibit.

== Research and education ==
The Natural History Museum Abu Dhabi functions as a scientific research and teaching institution. To support these roles, its research facility provides resources for extensive studies across various fields, including zoology, palaeontology, geology, marine biology, entomology, and the broader earth sciences. The facility also supports molecular research, focusing on areas such as ancient DNA (aDNA) and proteomics. Additionally, the museum seeks to engage the public with science and environmental stewardship through its collections, educational programs, and a focus on fostering collaboration at national and global levels regarding sustainable change.

== See also ==
- Guggenheim Abu Dhabi
- Louvre Abu Dhabi
- Zayed National Museum
