= Zayed National Museum =

- مَتْحَف زَايِد ٱلْوَطَنِي

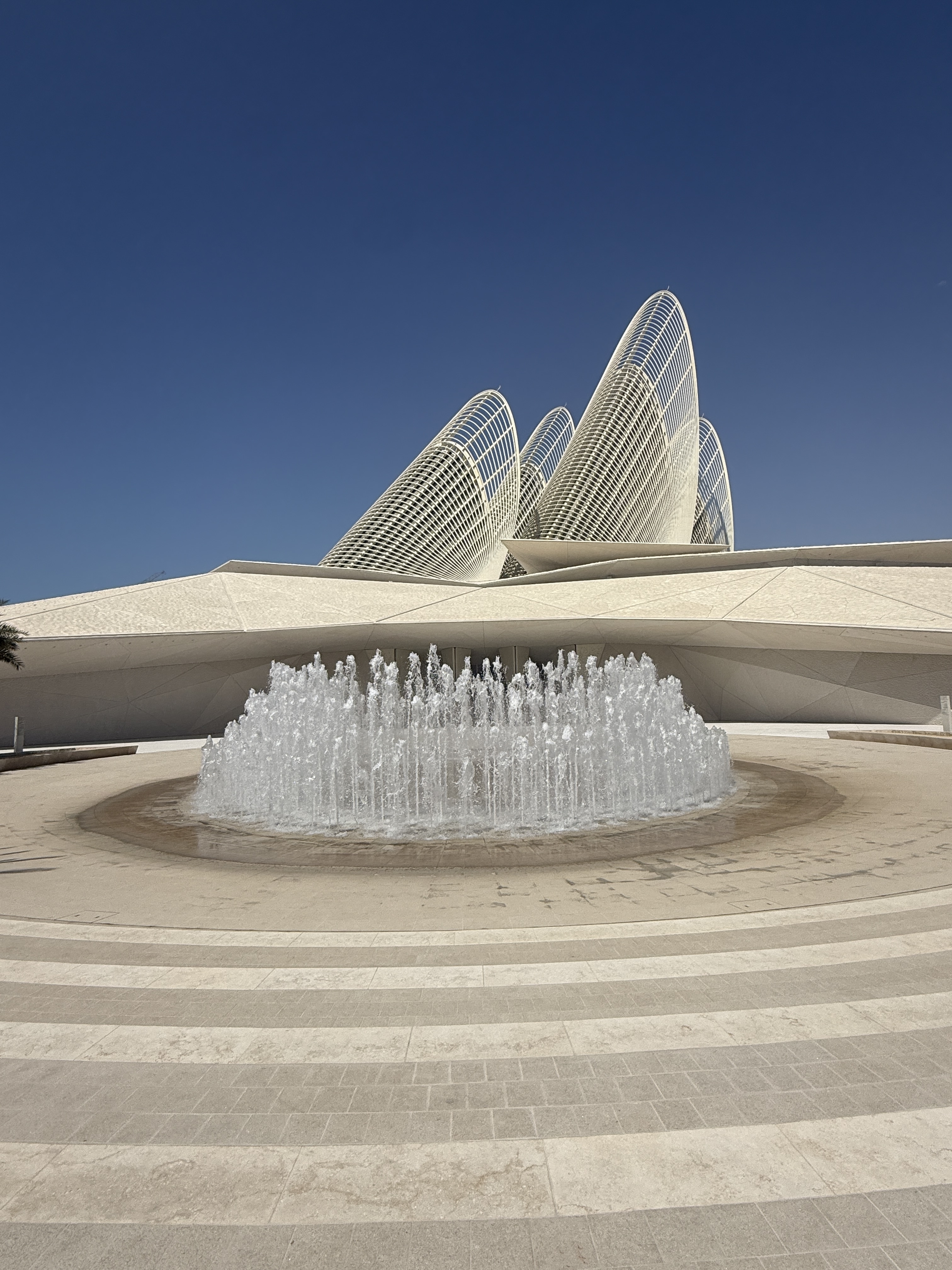
- Front entrance of the Zayed National Museum
- Established: 3 December 2025; 10 months ago
- Location: Saadiyat Island, Abu Dhabi, United Arab Emirates
- Coordinates: 24°32′4.43″N 54°25′7.69″E
- Type: National museum
- Director: Dr. Peter Magee
- Architect: Foster + Partners
- Website: zayednationalmuseum.ae

Zayed National Museum (Arabic: مَتْحَف زَايِد ٱلْوَطَنِي, romanized: Matḥaf Zāyid Al-Waṭanī) is a museum in Abu Dhabi, United Arab Emirates. It is designed as a memorial to the late Zayed bin Sultan Al Nahyan, the founding father and first president of the UAE. The museum is the centrepiece of the Saadiyat Island Cultural District, and showcases the history, culture, and economic transformation of the Emirates. Zayed National Museum, the national museum of the United Arab Emirates located in the heart of Saadiyat Cultural District, was opened to the public on 3 December 2025 and cost AED 2.5 billion or US$ 680 million to be built. An entrance ticket is around AED 70 for adults, 35 AED for university students and teachers, and free for under-18s. It is 123 m high.

== History ==
The museum was designed by Foster + Partners with five solar thermal towers that act as chimneys to draw cool air through the building. The towers are shaped like falcon wings to commemorate Zayed's love of falconry.

In 2009, the Zayed National Museum signed a ten-year contract with the British Museum. The British Museum agreed to assist with curation and to loan around 500 artifacts to the Zayed National Museum. According to The New York Times, the British Museum thinks that it is unlikely that any items would be loaned under the current contract, which ended in 2019. In June 2018, a renewed partnership was announced between the British Museum and Zayed National Museum. In July 2019, the archaeologist Dr. Peter Magee was appointed Director.

The museum's opening had been delayed several times. Its completion was scheduled in 2012, but was delayed to 2013 and later 2021.

The museum finally opened on December 3, 2025 where UAE President inaugurated the Zayed National Museum in the presence of the rulers of the Emirates as part of the 54th Eid Al Etihad celebrations. Following its inauguration, His Highness Sheikh Mohamed bin Zayed Al Nahyan, together with the rulers of the Emirates and senior sheikhs, toured the Zayed National Museum's galleries. Inside, they explored exhibits ranging from documents and archaeological artefacts to the personal belongings of the UAE's Founding Father, Sheikh Zayed bin Sultan Al Nahyan. The displays also feature audio recordings, photographs, and archival footage that capture defining moments in the nation's history.

The museum houses more than 3,000 artefacts, with 1,500 currently on display, each narrating the story of the UAE and its people. Alongside its permanent collection, the museum offers a space for temporary exhibitions and Al Masar Garden — a 600‑metre open‑air gallery showcasing the landscapes and stories that shaped the country. Inside the museum, there are two boats; an 18 m long replica of a Bronze Age Magan boat created through traditional techniques and materials. This boat was extensively documented and sailed as part of an archaeological experiment. The other boat is part of a museum display and has a tunnel inside the hull. There is also a 1966 Chrysler Newport black sedan which belonged to Sheikh Zayed. The rest of the museum holds archaeological artefacts from the UAE along with ephemera and gifts to Sheikh Zayed.

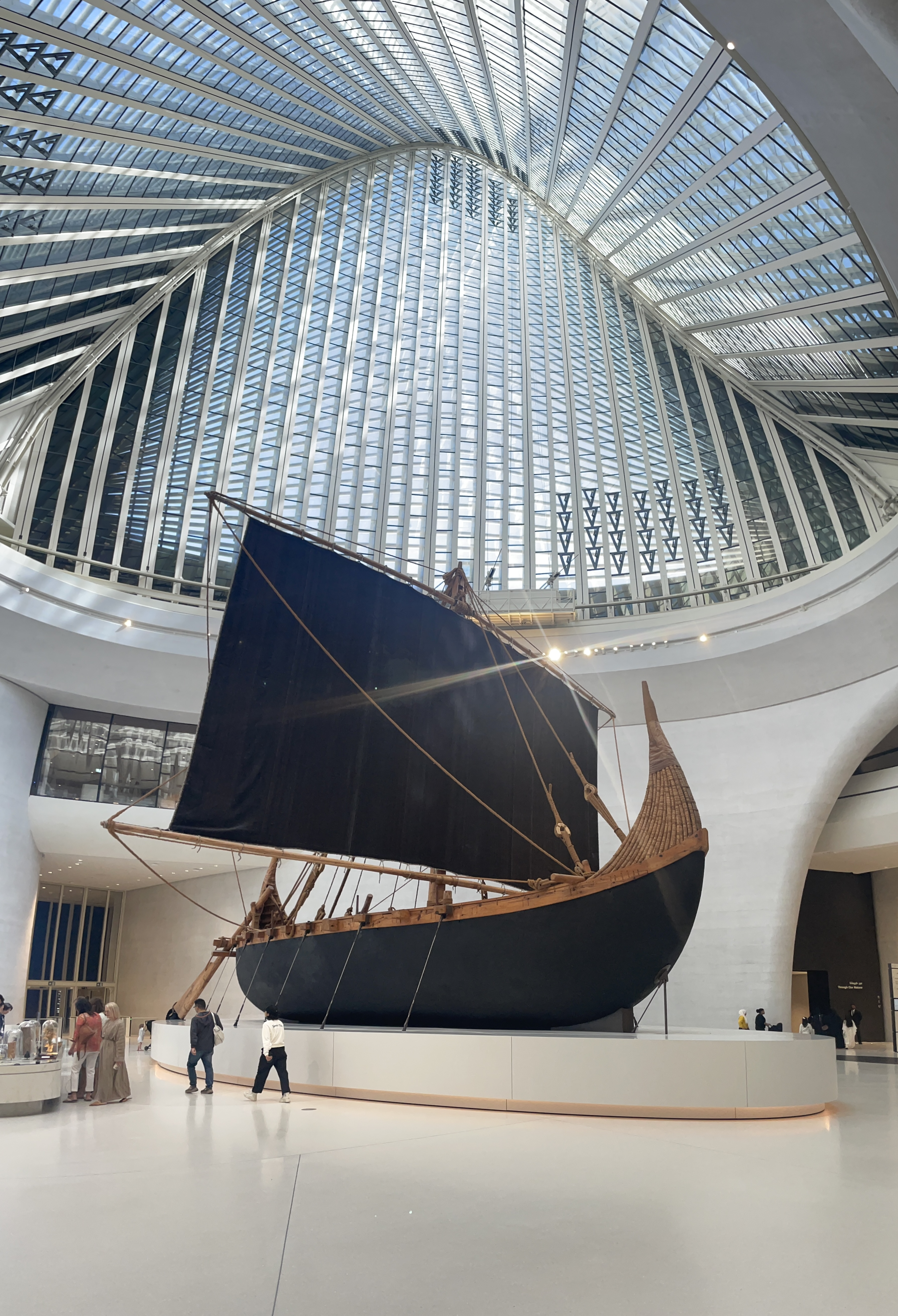
This 18m Bronze Age replica boat was created using traditional techniques and materials as part of experimental archaeology. The boat was sailed and now is on display at the Sheik Zayed Museum.

Six permanent galleries anchor the museum's narrative:

- Our Beginning: Sheikh Zayed's life, vision, and the unification of the Emirates.
- Through Our Nature: The UAE's diverse environments and sustainable traditions.
- To Our Ancestors: Archaeological finds reflecting millennia of human presence.
- Through Our Connections: Early communities, science, and shared knowledge.
- By Our Coasts: Maritime traditions and seafaring heritage.
- To Our Roots: Emirati identity, customs, and traditional livelihoods.

To celebrate its opening, the museum launched a cultural programme with live performances, workshops, guided tours, and creative activities.

== Architecture ==
The museum's design suggests that it keeps pace with the latest developments and modernity in architecture. It was designed by Pritzker Prize-winning architect Norman Foster. The museum's land area is 66,000 square metres, and consists of five towers that resemble the shape and design of a falcon's wings, inspired by their place in the cultural heritage of the United Arab Emirates. The height of these wings ranges between 83 and 123 metres. The museum has a large main lobby to welcome visitors, and two galleries on the ground floor that represent the heart of the museum. On the first floor, there are four galleries in the form of a hanging hill, each of which forms the base of one of the wings, in addition to an external hill 30 metres high, inspired by the terrain of the Emirates. Visitors can climb it and walk between the bases of the wings and get a direct view of the cultural area on Saadiyat Island.

== See also ==
- Louvre Abu Dhabi
- Guggenheim Abu Dhabi
- Natural History Museum Abu Dhabi
