= Magan boat =

Bronze Age seagoing vessels of the Persian Gulf

An 18-metre reconstruction of a Magan boat displayed at Zayed National Museum in Abu Dhabi, United Arab Emirates.

A Magan boat was a type of seagoing trading vessel used in the Persian Gulf and the northwestern Indian Ocean during the Bronze Age, particularly in the third millennium BCE. The vessels were associated with Magan, an ancient region generally identified with modern-day Oman and the United Arab Emirates. Magan was an important supplier of copper to Mesopotamia, and its boats formed part of maritime trade networks connecting Mesopotamia, Dilmun, and Meluhha.

Magan boats are documented in Sumerian cuneiform texts, including an administrative tablet from the 21st century BC recording materials needed for their construction. Archaeological finds suggest that at least some vessels used bundles of reeds, ropes, timber, and bitumen for waterproofing.

No complete Magan boat has been discovered. Knowledge of their construction derives from archaeological fragments, ancient texts, and experimental reconstructions. Several modern reconstructions were created; four boats of various lengths in Oman, and an 18-meter boat in Abu Dhabi. The latter successfully completed sea trials and is displayed at Zayed National Museum.

== Historical background ==
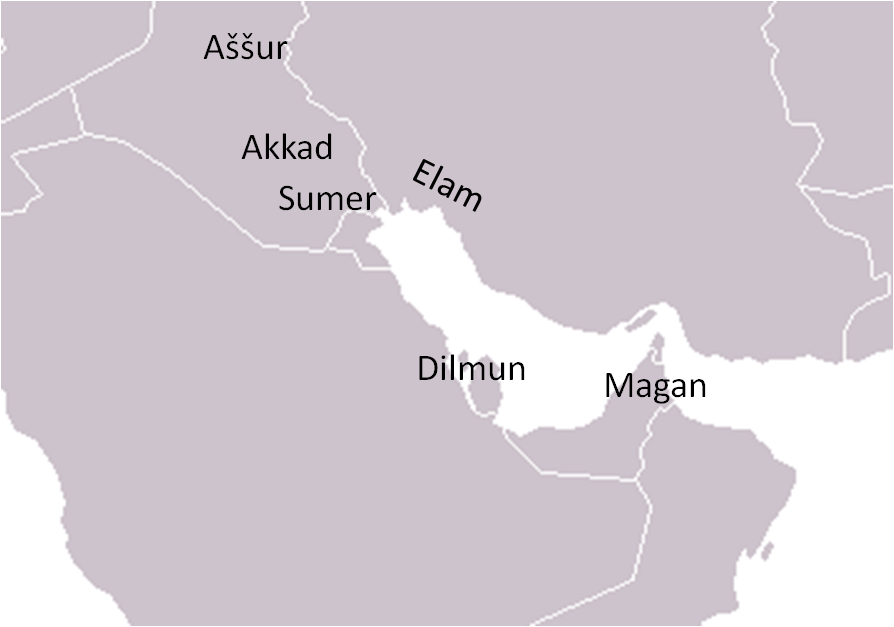
Magan on a map

During the third millennium BC, Magan was part of a network of maritime exchange linking the cities of southern Mesopotamia with communities in southeastern Arabia and the Indus Valley Civilisation. Copper extracted from the Hajar Mountains was one of Magan's principal exports to Mesopotamia. Besides copper, timber, stone, and semi-precious stones were also traded.

Mesopotamian cuneiform texts mention vessels connected with Magan. Accounts of the reign of Sargon of Akkad report ships from Magan, Dilmun, and Meluhha arriving at his capital, Akkade. Administrative tablets from the Ur III period, at the end of the third millennium BC, record the running of shipyards in the state of Lagash in 2040 BC, including the materials and the workforce used to build ships.

These texts do not describe a single standard type of Bronze Age boat. Iconography suggests that some vessels were built almost entirely of bound reeds and others of wood, and one tablet describes in detail a large wooden-planked vessel built in southern Mesopotamia. Another tablet, BM 18390, refers to both wood and reeds, which indicates that composite vessels of the two materials were used in trade between Mesopotamia and Magan.

== Archaeological evidence ==
=== Ra's al-Jinz, Oman ===
Some of the most significant archaeological evidence for Bronze Age boat construction has been recovered at Ra's al-Jinz, on the eastern coast of Oman. More than 300 fragments of bituminous material dating to approximately 2500–2100 BCE were found there; some fragments have impressions of bundled reeds, woven reed mats, timber, and rope lashings. Others have marine barnacles attached to their surfaces, indicating that they had been exposed to seawater for at least three months. The excavations were done in 1985 under the Joint Hadd Project led by Maurizio Tosi and Serge Cleuziou.

Tosi and Cleuziou interpreted these fragments as remnants of waterproof coatings from the hulls of ancient boats. They described the ships as the "black boats of Magan", a reference to their presumed bitumen-covered hulls.

A geochemical investigation published in 2005 found that the bitumen fragments found at Ra's al-Jinz originated in northern Mesopotamia.

=== Umm Al Nar, United Arab Emirates ===
Related evidence has been identified on Umm Al Nar, an island near Abu Dhabi that gave its name to the Umm Al Nar culture (c. 2600–2000 BCE). Samples of bitumen associated with ships were found there. Researchers involved in the 2024 Magan boat reconstruction reported that bitumen found on Umm Al Nar could be matched to sources in Mesopotamia.

=== Earlier evidence from the Persian Gulf ===
At the archaeological site of H3, As-Sabiyah, in Kuwait, excavations uncovered more than 50 fragments of bituminous material, some with reed impressions and marine barnacles. A ceramic boat model was also discovered. The finds date to the sixth and fifth millennia BCE, several thousand years before the principal Bronze Age references to Magan.

== Cuneiform tablet ==
Clay tablet with a list of items needed for the boats of Magan. Published in 1899.

A Sumerian cuneiform administrative tablet from the Third Dynasty of Ur (c. 2112–2004 BCE), excavated at Girsu (modern Tello, Iraq), contains a list of materials needed for the construction of a Magan boat. (Note: The tablet is preserved in the British Museum under museum number BM 18390 (registration number 1895,0329.48).) It was first published in 1899 in Cuneiform Texts from Babylonian Tablets in the British Museum, volume VII, plate 31.

=== Text ===
The following table reproduces the transliteration and English translation published by the British Museum for tablet BM 18390.

Transliteration and translation of BM 18390
| Line | Sumerian transliteration | English translation |
Obverse
| 1 | 178 gišgišnimbar-gal | 178 large palm trees |
| 2 | 1400 gišu3-suh5 gal | 1400 large pine(?) trees |
| 3 | 36 giššinig gal | 36 large tamarisk trees |
| 4 | 32 gišše-du10 gal | 32 large acacia(?)-trees |
| 5 | 10 giššinig 3 kuš3-ta | 10 tamarisk trees, each 3 cubits |
| 6 | 276 gu2 šu-sar mangaga | 276 talents of palm fibre rope |
| 7 | 34 gu2 šu-sar peš | 34 talents of palm leaf rope |
| 8 | 418 gu2 u2gamun2 | 418 talents of reeds |
| 9 | 207 gu2 A.GUGx | 207 talents of halfa-grass |
| 10 | 753(?) kuš gu4 | 753(?) ox hides |
| 11 | 44 gu2 48 ma-na sig2 ud5 | 44 talents, 48 minas of goat hair |
| 12 | 5.3.1 5 sila3 i3 ku6 gur | 1695 litres of fish oil |
Reverse
| 1 | 5 U ŠU.NI.x | … |
| 2 | 4260 sa gi-ŠID | 4260 bundles of construction-reeds |
| 3 | 12324 sa gi-NE | 12324 bundles of fuel(?)-reeds |
| 4 | 3170.0.0 esir2 luh gur | 3170 GUR-measures of purified bitumen |
| 5 | ma2 Ma2-gan du8-de3 | For making watertight the Magan-boats. |
| 6 | ki ensi2 Gir2-suki-ka | From the governor of Girsu. |

Robert Keith Englund has compared the fish oil and bitumen recorded in BM 18390 with other Ur III administrative documents concerning the sealing of boat hulls. He identified parallels suggesting that oils could be used as sealants in ancient Mesopotamian shipbuilding.

== In other texts ==
In the inscription of the myth Enki and the World Order, "the god declares that he 'moored the Dilmun-boat to the ground, loaded the Magan-boat skyhigh'". It is interpreted as either a "demonstration of the exceptional prosperity that Enki brought to both places", or to the types of boats used in maritime trade between Dilmun, Indus cities, and Sumer.

== Construction and design ==
Archaeological evidence suggests that at least some Magan boats were composite vessels constructed using reeds, timber, rope, and bitumen.

Reeds were probably gathered into bundles and bound with cordage, while wooden elements provided additional structural support. Reed mats may have been placed over parts of the hull before a waterproof bituminous coating was applied. Bitumen would have protected the reed structure from seawater.

The exact form and rigging of Magan boats remain uncertain. Ancient depictions on seals and other objects have been used to reconstruct their shape, including raised or curved ends and possible sailing arrangements. Such depictions do not establish a single standardized vessel type. In a 1981 PhD thesis, C. Qualls counted "217 boat models and 186 seals or impressions, all before 2000 BC"; some of the depictions were used to develop "a generic hull model" of a Bronze Age Magan boat. Another evidence is a bitumen boat models, which were found at the Royal Graves at Ur.

Mesopotamian texts describe boats using the unit gur, a measure of volume. Cuneiform tablets mention ships of 1 to 300 gur capacity. Modern researchers have attempted to use these records to estimate vessel capacities and dimensions, although the resulting figures depend on assumptions about cargo, displacement, and construction methods.

== Reconstructions ==
=== Reconstructions in Oman ===
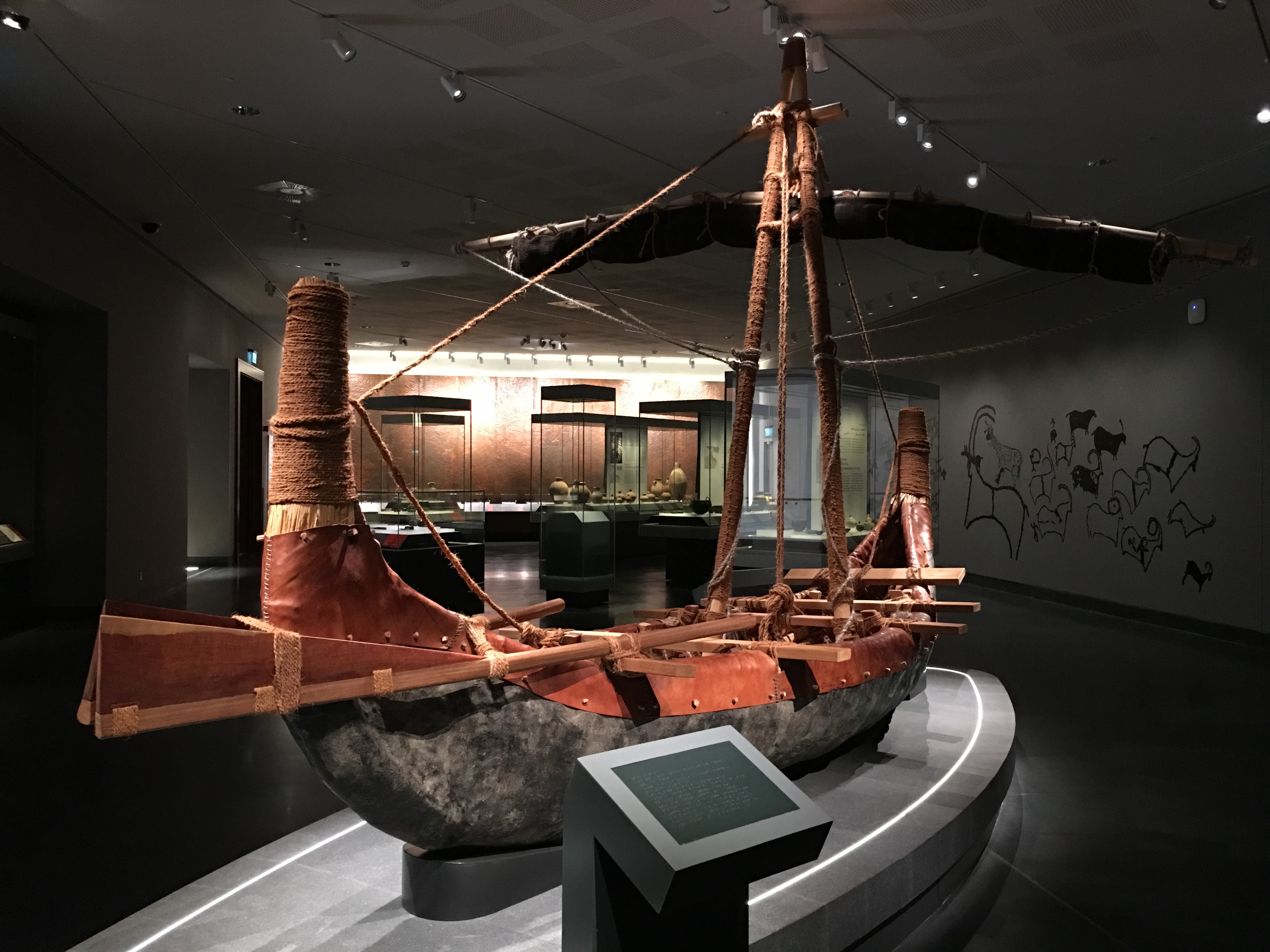
The model of a Magan boat constructed in Oman in 2012.

Maritime archaeologist Tom Vosmer directed a series of experimental reconstructions intended to investigate the construction and performance of Magan boats. The projects were based on archaeological discoveries at Ra's al-Jinz, ancient depictions, and written evidence.

The first experiments included a 1:20 scale model and a 4.5-5-meter long boat Magan I built in Oman.

A larger, 13-meter long boat Magan II, was built in Italy in 2002. It was "built frame-first, upside down, over reed frames reminiscent of the framing of the huge Iraqi Marsh Arab houses called mudhif". According to Vosmer:

To construct the vessel required nearly three tonnes of Phragmites australis reeds, approximately 12 km of hand-made Carex fibre rope, about 300 kg of Omani timber, 700 kg of pure bitumen, 800 kg of lime powder, and 20 kg of fish oil.

A third reconstruction, 12-meter long Magan III, was built at Sur, Oman, in 2005. The vessel began a planned journey from Oman towards Dwarka in western India in September 2005. However, it developed leaks and sank a few hours after departure, approximately six miles off Sur. All eight crew members were rescued, but the boat was lost.

In 2012, the National Museum of Oman commissioned a fourth boat to be built by Oman Maritime. This one had "a much stronger wooden frame" than the three earlier reconstructions. The museum requested the model to show "different layers of construction", so "the outer bitumen layer was not complete on the starboard side", and thus no sea trials were conducted. The boat is currently in the Pre-History and Ancient History Gallery in the museum.

=== Reconstruction in Abu Dhabi (2024) ===
In 2021, Zayed National Museum launched a new Magan boat project in collaboration with Zayed University and New York University Abu Dhabi. Several researchers involved in the project previously participated in reconstruction of the Jewel of Muscat ship.

The researchers designed a boat measuring 18 meters in length. Its dimensions were calculated using hydrostatic analysis, with the design based on an assumed capacity of 120 gur, equivalent to approximately 36 tonnes in the project's calculations.

The outer hull was made using approximately 15 tonnes of locally sourced reeds, which were soaked, stripped of their leaves, crushed, and bound into long bundles using ropes made from date-palm fibre. These bundles were lashed to an internal structure of timber frames and coated with bitumen to make the hull watertight.

The reconstructed boat is equipped with a large square sail made from goat hair. Traditional shipwrights, including craftsmen from Kerala in southern India, participated in its construction. Researchers also conducted experiments to test the strength of reed bundles, rope lashings, and bituminous coatings.

The boat was launched in 2024 and underwent trials off the coast of Abu Dhabi. It initially experienced leakage, requiring additional waterproofing before further testing. During two days of sea trials, the boat travelled approximately 50 nautical miles (93 kilometres), reaching a maximum speed of 5.6 knots (10.4 km/h). The trials were accompanied by the UAE Coast Guard.

The Magan boat replica at Zayed National Museum

The boat is displayed at Zayed National Museum on Saadiyat Island in Abu Dhabi. The museum opened t the public on 3 December 2025.
