= Ras al-Jinz =

Coordinates: 22.4238°N 59.8385°E

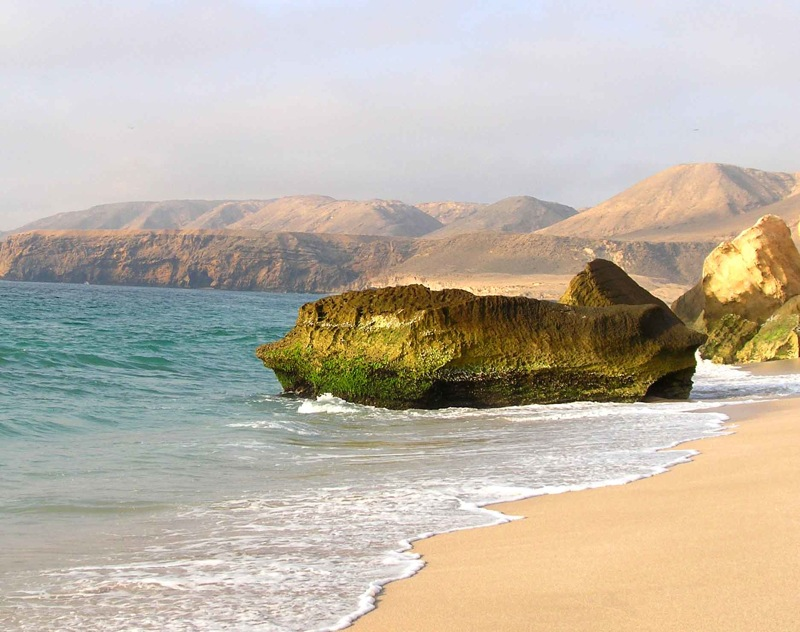
Beach with the Eastern Hajar Mountains in the background

Location of Ras al-Jinz

Raʾs al-Jinz (Arabic: رَأْس ٱلْجِنْز; formerly known as Cape Rosalgate as named by the Portuguese, a corruption of Raʾs al-Hadd; Arabic: رَأْس ٱلْحَدّ) or Raʾs al-Junayz (Arabic: رَأْس ٱلْجُنَيْز), located in Ash-Sharqiyyah South Governorate, Oman, is the easternmost point of the Arabian Peninsula. It is a nesting site for green turtles, as also is the beach at the local village of Ras al Hadd. It is home to a well-known turtle reserve. Important archaeological discoveries have also been made at this site, demonstrating connections to the Indus Valley in ancient times.

== Bronze Age harbour ==
At Ras al-Jinz, since 1985, a Bronze Age (approximately 2200 to 1900 BC) harbour site has been excavated by a Franco-Italian team. There was a large mudbrick building with seven rooms. These rooms opened onto a corridor. The building seems to have served as a manufacturing workshop. There is evidence of processing of shellfish, turtle shell, flint, and cosmetics, which were extracted from magnesium ore.

Among the finds, about 20% of the ceramics came from the Indus Valley culture. There were also ceramic fragments inscribed with the Indus script symbols.

Among the Indus wares, large ceramic jars were found in Oman. Their presence at Ras Al Jinz is seen as a clear indication of overseas trade. Thus, during the 3d millennium BCE, Oman must have been part of a great trading systems linked with the Indian Ocean. These jars are interpreted as cargo-shipment containers for dry goods being transported over water.

== Remains of boats ==
The discovery of impressed bitumen fragments and slabs at the site provides information on procedures for reed and wooden boat construction, known as Magan boats. These objects are dated to the mid-3d millennium BCE.

The bitumen pieces carry traces of ropes, reed mats, reed bundles, and other details of boat construction. Many of them are also encrusted with sea barnacles. Based on these finds, a mid-3rd-millennium 12-m-long boat replica was built and tested. These are the indications that this was a Bronze Age port serving the ships from the Indus Valley. Ras al-Jinz remains an important landmark for merchant ships coming from Pakistan and India.

== Metallurgy ==
Copper smelting and metalworking workshops dating to 3000-1200 BCE have also been discovered.

== Gallery ==
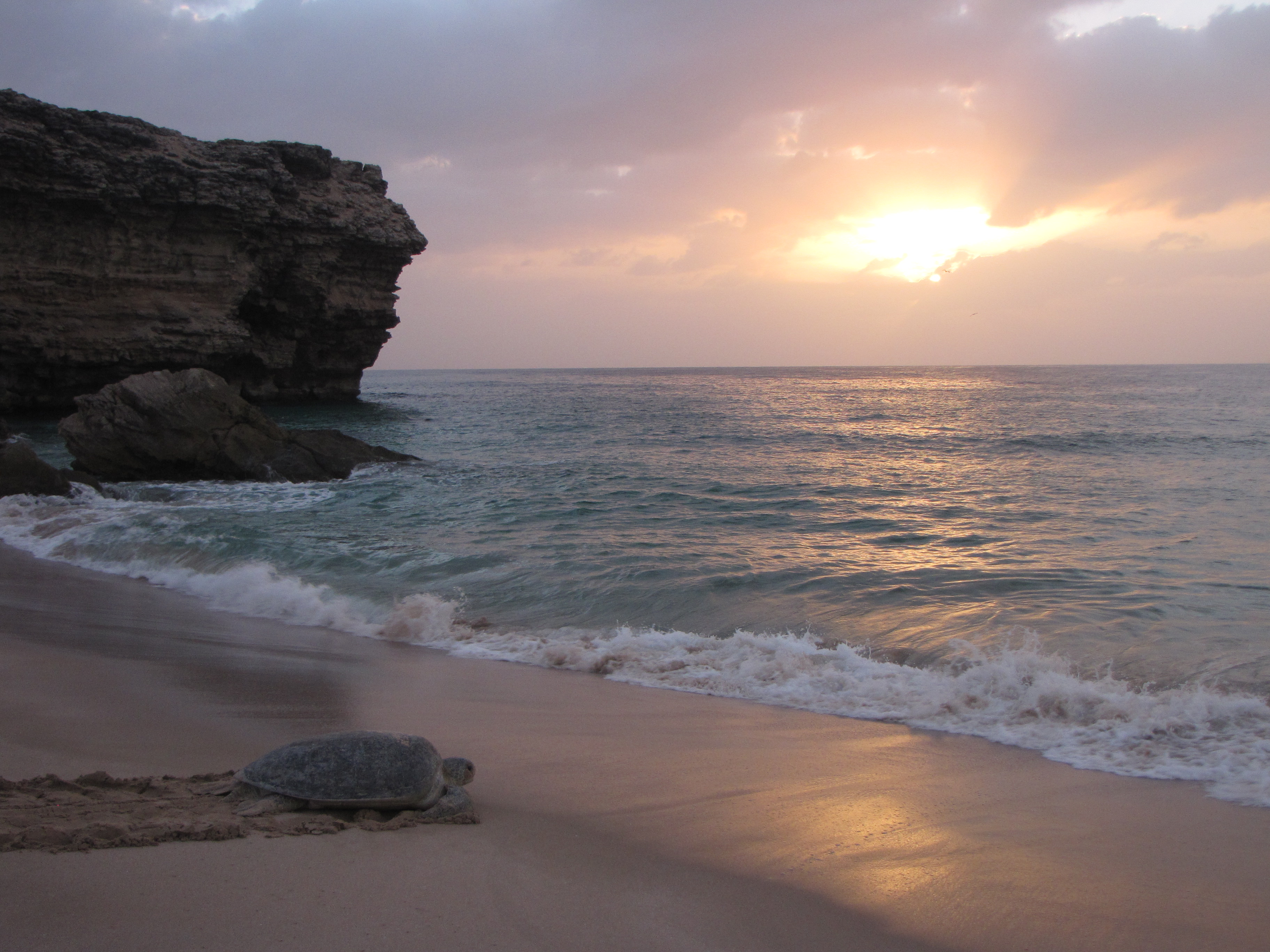
Beach

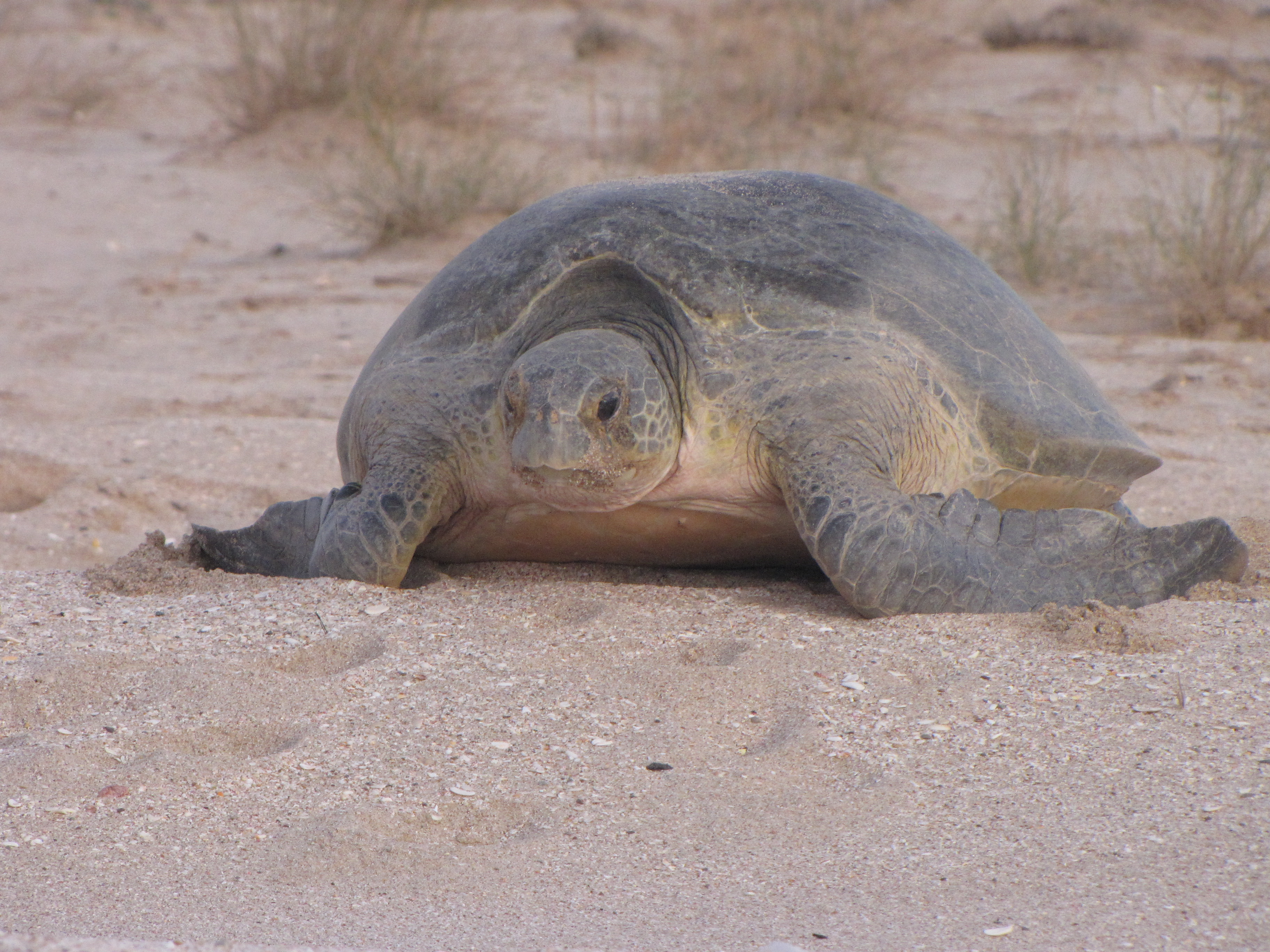
Females laying eggs

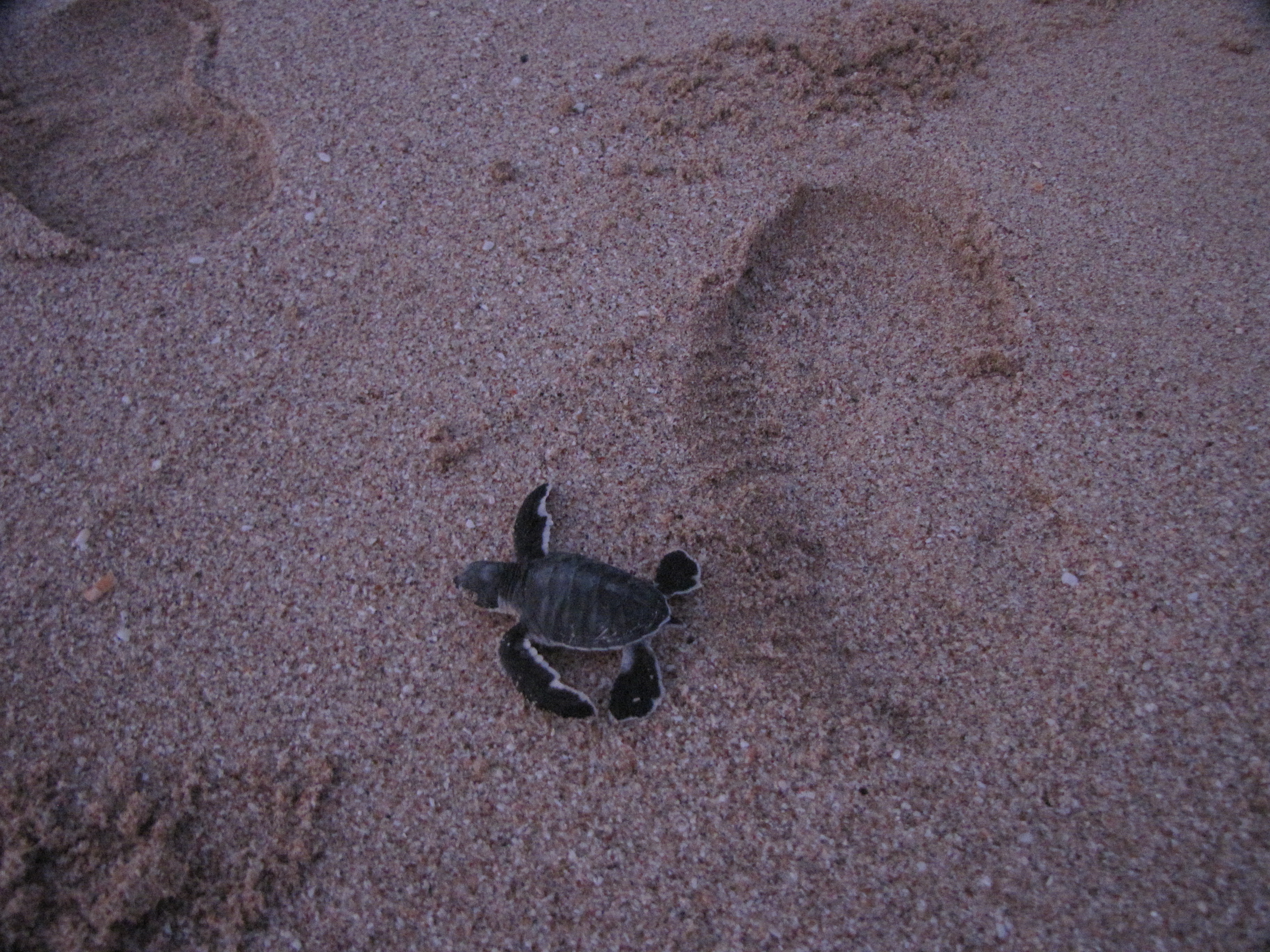
Freshly hatched young

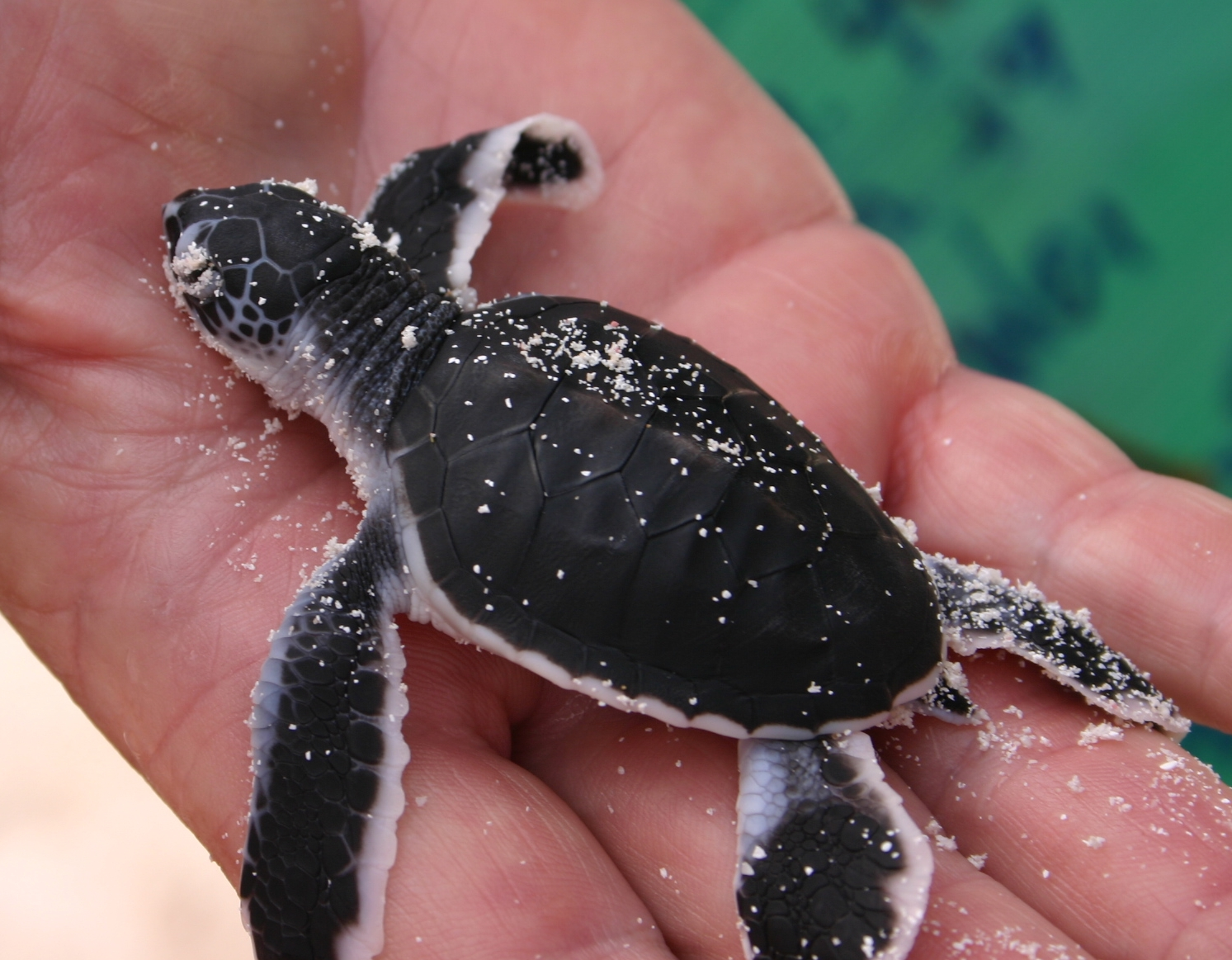
hatched Green sea turtle

== See also ==
- Magan
