= Danny Hellman =

American cartoonist

- Born: Daniel Hellman; August 2, 1964 (age 62) Wiesbaden, Germany
- Areas: Cartoonist, Artist, Editor, Publisher
- Pseudonym: Dirty Danny
- Notable works: Legal Action Comics

Danny Hellman (born August 2, 1964) is an American freelance illustrator and cartoonist. Since 1989, his illustrations have appeared in publications including Time, Fortune, Sports Illustrated, The Wall Street Journal and others, and his comic book work has appeared in DC Comics publications.

== Early life ==
Danny Hellman was raised in the Jackson Heights neighborhood of Queens, New York City, New York. He graduated from the High School of Art & Design, in Manhattan, in 1982, and took figure drawing classes throughout the 1980s at the Art Students League. After teaming with Bill Mantlo, a veteran comic book writer, on a presentation for a comic based on the Robotron: 2084 arcade video game, and being told by editor-in-chief Tom DeFalco that Hellman's artwork was not yet professional quality, Hellman briefly attended the School of Visual Arts. He soon dropped out and began working as a bicycle messenger, while drawing and distributing posters for the rock music band Floor Kiss.

== Career ==
Danny Hellman's career began in 1988. Hellman, then a self-described "stoner" who lived in his grandparents' attic in Queens, followed illustrator friends in getting freelance work from Kevin Hein, art director of the weekly New York City pornographic newspaper Screw. Hellman showed Hein a portfolio of his rock posters, and a modified version of one became Hellman's first Screw cover. He continued to contribute cover art to the magazine on a regular basis, and provide occasional interior comic-strip work parodying the likes of Superman, The Simpsons, and The Cosby Show, until Screw ceased publication in 2006.

In the early 1990s, Hellman went on to illustrate for art director Michael Gentile at New York Press — later continuing with Gentile with the art director moved to Habitat — and the local periodicals The Village Voice, and Guitar World. Hellman eventually drew for national publications including Time, Fortune, Sports Illustrated, The Wall Street Journal, and FHM.

Hellman's earliest recorded credit is penciling and inking writer Dennis Eichhorn's two-page autobiographical story "Iron Denny" in Starhead Comix's Real Schmuck #4 (April 1993).

In the early to mid 1990s, Hellman self-published a number of minicomics, which included Coffee Drinkin' Man, (written by Hellman's friend, East Village painter Geoff Gilmore); the original version of Legal Action Comics, which reprinted strips of his from Screw that parodied Superman, The Simpsons, and The Cosby Show; and Peaceful Atom and the Mystery Mice.

He went on to draw comics for a variety of alternative comics publishers, as well as an Aquaman story for DC Comics' Bizarro World, and several one-page strips for The Big Book of series of trade paperbacks for the DC imprint Paradox Press. Other comics work includes Hotwire, Mad, Last Gasp Comics & Stories #1-5 (1994–1997), and Fantagraphics' Spicecapades (Spring 1999).

== Ted Rall lawsuit ==
Hellman has been described as a "veteran prankster". Following an August 3, 1999 Village Voice cover story criticizing Maus author Art Spiegelman by editorial cartoonist Ted Rall, Hellman created an email list called "Rallsballs@onelist.com" and sent a satirically self-agrandizing letter entitled "Ted Rall's Balls", impersonating Rall, to at least 35 cartoonists and editors, including The New York Times. Rall filed a lawsuit, claiming among other things, libel, lost employment opportunities and emotional distress, and asking damages of US$ 1.5 million. Eventually four of Rall's five claims were dismissed, leaving only libel per se. The case had still not gone to trial in 2005, when Rall's attorney died.

To defray legal costs, Hellman published two charity anthologies designed to raise funds. What was to be a third issue became the summer anthology Typhon.
