= Michael Maslin =

American cartoonist

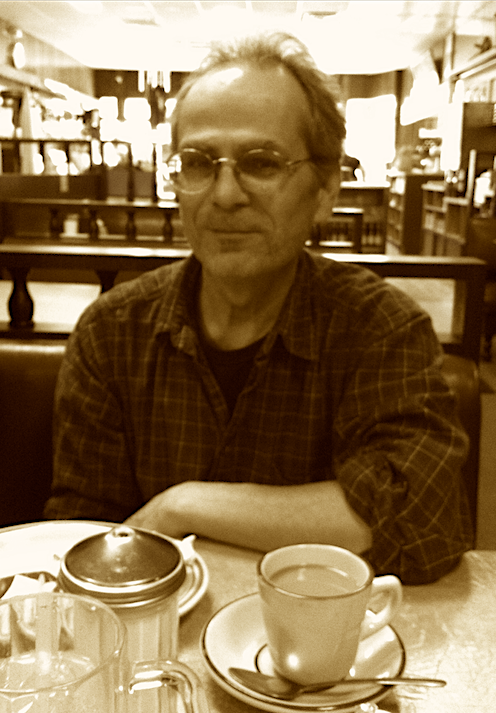
- Michael Maslin at Holsten's in Bloomfield, N.J.
- Spouse: Liza Donnelly
- Writing career
- Genre: Cartoon
- Website: michaelmaslin.com

Michael Maslin is an American cartoonist for The New Yorker magazine. He is the author of Peter Arno: The Mad Mad World of The New Yorker’s Greatest Cartoonist published in April 2016 by Regan Arts. Four collections of his work were published by Simon & Schuster. With his wife and fellow New Yorker cartoonist, Liza Donnelly, he co-edited one collection of drawings and co-authored three collections, including Cartoon Marriage: Adventures in Love and Matrimony by The New Yorker's Cartooning Couple.

== Career ==
Michael Maslin first sold an idea for a cartoon to The New Yorker in 1977, which was later executed by veteran cartoonist Whitney Darrow Jr. Maslin’s first cartoon under his own name appeared in the April 17, 1978 issue of The New Yorker. His work has appeared in numerous publications including Harper’s Magazine, The New York Times, Mother Jones, TIME, The Saturday Evening Post, Utne Reader, Harvard Business Review, The Southampton Review, and Narrative Magazine.

Maslin’s book Cartoon Marriage: Adventures in Love and Matrimony by The New Yorker's Cartooning Couple, written with his wife, Liza Donnelly, was optioned by Jennifer Garner's production company, Vandalia Films. The script was written by Lizzie McGuire creator Terri Minsky. In 2009 he began Ink Spill, a website devoted to New Yorker cartoonists news and history. Ink Spill has been cited in The New York Times on a number of occasions.

Maslin and Donnelly were the subjects of a CBS Sunday Morning segment, “Drawn Together”, which aired February 15, 2009.

== Early life and education ==
Maslin was born in Montclair, New Jersey, and was raised in Bloomfield, New Jersey. He attended Bloomfield High School, then attended Kean University before transferring to the University of Connecticut, where he graduated in 1976 with a BFA.

== Personal life ==
Maslin is married to fellow New Yorker cartoonist Liza Donnelly. They have two daughters.

== Bibliography ==
- At Wit's End: Cartoonists of The New Yorker (photographs by Alen MacWeeney, foreword by Emma Allen), Clarkson Potter (2024) ISBN 978-0593581056
- Peter Arno: The Mad Mad World of The New Yorker’s Greatest Cartoonist, Regan Arts (2016) ISBN 978-1942872610
- J. Herman's Museum Adventure, Pine Brothers Charity Press (2014) ASIN B01FJ0I0PM
- Cartoon Marriage: Adventures in Love and Matrimony by The New Yorker's Cartooning Couple (with Liza Donnelly), Random House (January 27, 2009) ISBN 1400068088
- Husbands And Wives (with Liza Donnelly), Random House (1995) ISBN 978-0-345-39041-7
- Call Me When You Reach Nirvana (with Liza Donnelly), Andrews McMeel (1995) ISBN 0836204204
- Fathers and Sons: It's a Funny Relationship! (with Liza Donnelly), Random House (May, 1994), ISBN 978-0-345-38676-2
- Mixed Company, Fireside/Simon & Schuster (1990) ISBN 0671663380
- The Crowd Goes Wild!, Fireside/Simon & Schuster (1989) ISBN 0671663372
- The Gang’s All Here!, Fireside/Simon & Schuster (1988) ISBN 0671635360
- The More The Merrier, Fireside/Simon & Schuster (1987) ISBN 0671635352
- 115 Drawings, Lawford Press (1977) ASIN B008K0ZIP4
