= Guggenheim Abu Dhabi =

Art museum in the UAE

- جوجنهايم أبوظبي
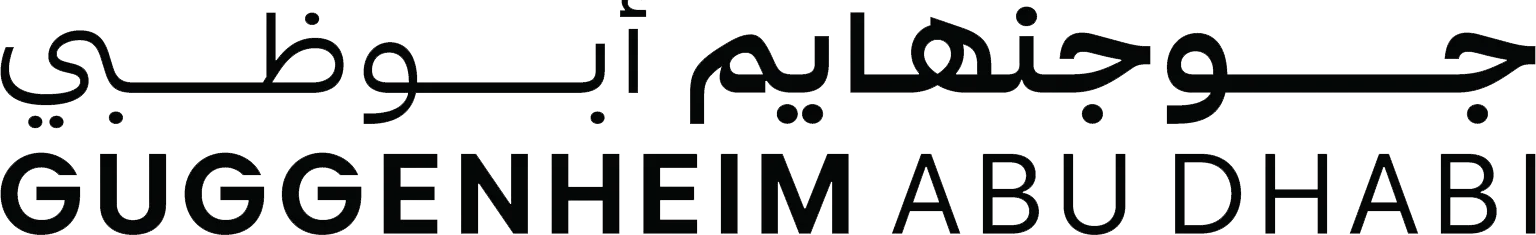

- A computer generated image of the planned Guggenheim Abu Dhabi
- Established: 11 December 2026 (Expected)
- Location: Saadiyat Island; Abu Dhabi, United Arab Emirates
- Coordinates: 24°32′22.25″N 54°23′56.25″E
- Type: Art museum
- Website: guggenheimabudhabi.ae

The Guggenheim Abu Dhabi (Arabic: جوجنهايم أبوظبي) is a planned art museum under construction in the Saadiyat Island cultural district in Abu Dhabi, United Arab Emirates. Upon completion, it is planned to be the largest of the Guggenheim museums. Architect Frank Gehry designed the building. After announcing the museum project in 2006, work on the site began in 2011 but was soon suspended. A series of construction delays have followed. The opening date is expected to be 11 December 2026.

The museum is part of a larger complex of arts and cultural institutions on Saadiyat Island intended to appeal to international tourists. The museum's collection is expected to focus on modern and contemporary art from West Asia, North Africa and South Asia.

== Early history ==
On 8 July 2006, the city of Abu Dhabi, capital of the United Arab Emirates, announced it had signed an agreement with the Solomon R. Guggenheim Foundation in New York City to build a 30,000-square-metre (320,000 ft^{2}) Guggenheim Museum on Saadiyat Island.

The Guggenheim stated in 2008 that "Abu Dhabi's Tourism Development & Investment Company ... will own the museum", while "[t]he Guggenheim Foundation will establish and manage" its program. William Mack, Chair of the Solomon R. Guggenheim Foundation, said: "It is with a keen sense of historical precedent and with an abiding commitment to cultural exchange as a bridge to international understanding that the foundation enters into this agreement to establish a Guggenheim museum in Abu Dhabi." Abu Dhabi's then crown prince, later president of the UAE and ruler of Abu Dhabi, Mohammed bin Zayed Al Nahyan, indicated that the "signing represents the determination of the Abu Dhabi Government to create a world-class cultural destination for its residents and visitors.

== Location in Saadiyat cultural district ==
The museum is planned to be located on Saadiyat Island, just offshore of the city of Abu Dhabi. The island's cultural district is planned to house the largest cluster of world-class cultural assets in Abu Dhabi. The Guggenheim building is part of a massive project to "create an exhibition space intended to turn this once-sleepy desert city along the Persian Gulf into an international arts capital and tourist destination." Former Guggenheim director Thomas Krens indicated that "The Middle East is one of the world's most important emerging regions in terms of contemporary culture."

The facilities at the island include the Louvre Abu Dhabi art museum designed by Jean Nouvel, which opened in 2017. Additional planned facilities include the Zayed National Museum, designed by United Kingdom-based construction company Foster and Partners under the direction of Lord Norman Foster; a performing arts centre designed by Zaha Hadid; a New York University campus, a maritime museum with concept design by Tadao Ando and a number of arts pavilions.

== Design and construction ==
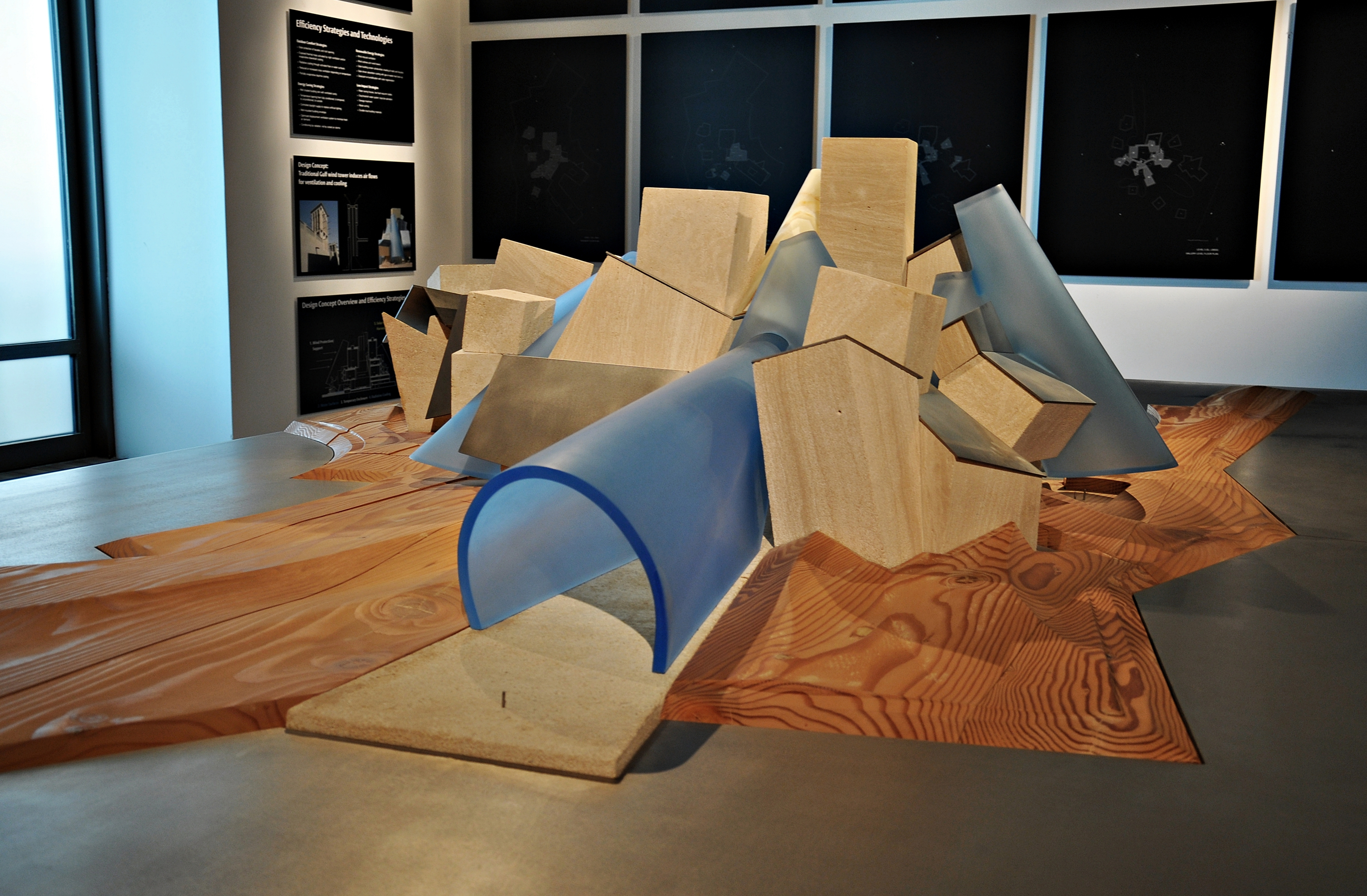
Guggenheim Abu Dhabi model design

The Guggenheim museum's design is by architect Frank Gehry. The lighting was designed by L'Observatoire International. Flanked on three sides by the Arabian Gulf, the site also acts as a manmade breakwater that protects the island's northern beaches. Gehry noted, "The site itself, virtually on the water or close to the water on all sides, in a desert landscape with the beautiful sea and the light quality of the place suggested some of the direction."

The museum is planned, at 320,000 square feet (30,000 m^{2}), to be the Solomon R. Guggenheim Foundation's largest facility. It is designed to accommodate approximately 130,000 square feet (12,000 m^{2}) of exhibition space. Gehry's design features exhibition galleries, education and research space, a conservation laboratory, a center for contemporary Arab, Islamic and Middle Eastern culture, and a center for "art and technology". Inspired by traditional middle-eastern covered courtyards and wind towers, used to cool structures exposed to the desert sun, the museum's clusters of horizontal and vertical galleries of various sizes are connected by catwalks and planned around a central, covered courtyard, incorporating natural features intended to maximize the energy efficiency of the building. The largest galleries will offer a grand scale for the display of large contemporary art installations. Parts of the building will be four stories tall with galleries stacked atop each other. The museum is intended to be a centerpiece in the island's plan for contemporary art and culture".

In 2011, the museum began site and structural work on a peninsula at the northwestern tip of Saadiyat Island adjacent to Abu Dhabi, but construction was suspended the same year. The completion date was first pushed back from 2011 to 2013 then to 2015, after the emirate cancelled contracts with concrete suppliers, and again to 2017. Continued progress awaited the approval of construction applications and contracts by the Tourism Development & Investment Company (TDIC). In 2019, The Guggenheim Foundation expected construction of the museum to be completed around 2023 and that the museum would include a center for art and technology, a children's education facility, archives, library and research center and a conservation laboratory.

In October 2021, the construction of the museum was awarded to BESIX Group subsidiary Six Construct and Trojan Contracting. Abu Dhabi Department of Culture & Tourism then expected the museum to be completed in 2025. As of July 2026, the Department of Culture & Tourism expects the museum's opening to be held on 11 December 2026.

== Artwork ==
The Guggenheim Foundation has said that the artworks to be displayed at the museum will "respect Abu Dhabi's culture and national and Islamic heritage. Our objective is not to be confrontational, but to be engaged in a cultural exchange," to reconcile the boldness of contemporary art with conservative Muslim values. The Foundation also stated that it "regards all contemporary cultures and their traditions as potential partners in the field of aesthetic discourse ... the Middle East is one of the world's most important emerging regions in terms of contemporary culture."

Guggenheim curators began collecting an international representation of art in 2009. The museum showed a preview of these works as "Seeing Through Light: Selections from the Guggenheim Abu Dhabi Collection" at the island's visitor center at Saadiyat from November 2014 through January 2015. It presented another exhibition in Abu Dhabi in 2017 and has continued to build its collection, focusing on modern and contemporary art from West Asia, North Africa and South Asia. The collection is expected to include, initially, 970 works of artists from around the world "with a specific focus on West Asia and the wider region" and "in a variety of mediums. The emphasis will be on modern and contemporary art" created since 1960.

== Reports of worker abuse ==
In 2011, over 130 international artists urged a boycott of the new Guggenheim museum (as well as Louvre Abu Dhabi), citing reports, since 2009, of abuses of foreign construction workers on Saadiyat Island, including the arbitrary withholding of wages, unsafe working conditions, and failure of companies to pay or reimburse the steep recruitment fees being charged to laborers. According to Architectural Record, Abu Dhabi has comprehensive labor laws to protect the workers, but they are not consistently enforced. In 2010, the Guggenheim Foundation placed on its website a joint statement with TDIC committing to minimum standards for workers.

In 2013, The Observer reported that conditions for the workers at the Louvre and New York University construction sites on Saadiyat amounted to "modern-day slavery". In 2014, the Guggenheim's Director, Richard Armstrong, said that he believed that living conditions for the workers at the Louvre project were now good and that "many fewer" of them were having their passports confiscated. He stated that the main issue then remaining was the recruitment fees charged to workers by agents who recruit them. Later in 2014, the Guggenheim's architect, Gehry, commented that working with the Abu Dhabi officials to implement the law to improve the labor conditions at the museum's site is "a moral responsibility." He encouraged the TDIC to build additional worker housing and proposed that the contractor cover the cost of the recruitment fees. In 2012, TDIC engaged PricewaterhouseCoopers as an independent monitor required to issue reports every quarter. Labor lawyer Scott Horton told Architectural Record that he hoped the Guggenheim project will influence the treatment of workers on other Saadiyat sites and will "serve as a model for doing things right."

== See also ==
- List of Guggenheim Museums
- List of works by Frank Gehry
- Louvre Abu Dhabi
- Zayed National Museum
- Natural History Museum Abu Dhabi
