= Legal Action Comics =

Legal Action Comics is a series of comics anthologies edited by illustrator Danny Hellman which features work from many alternative comics artists.

The first volume in the series was published in 2001, and the second followed in 2003. The Legal Action Comics series was initially conceived as a means to raise money for Hellman's legal fees after fellow cartoonist Ted Rall filed a 1.5 million dollar lawsuit against him.

Cartoonists featured in the Legal Action Comics series include Hellman, R. Crumb, Art Spiegelman, Kim Deitch, Skip Williamson, Robert Williams, Tony Millionaire, Michael Kupperman, R. Sikoryak, Mike Diana, Johnny Ryan, Sam Henderson, Spain Rodriguez, John Linton Roberson, Lauren Weinstein and more.
