= Habitat (magazine) =

Habitat is an American real estate magazine founded in 1982 and aimed at co-op boards, condominium associations, and related professionals such as attorneys and managing agents. The print magazine concentrates on the greater New York City metropolitan area while its Web site contains features for general-interest co-op/condo directors, residents, and buyers/sellers.

== Publication history ==
Journalist Carol J. Ott founded what was then titled N.Y. Habitat in New York City in 1982, for a primary audience of co-op and loft owners/renters. The magazine had evolved from Ott's 1980-82 newspaper, The Loft Letter. Originally bimonthly, in 1997 the publication schedule increased to 11 times yearly, with one double-issue. As of 2016, Ott remains publisher and editor-in-chief. The Associate Publisher is Bill Fink and the Operations Manager is Leslie Strauss.

== Editorial and art ==
Habitat publishes both human-interest feature stories, such as how a co-op board avoided a financial collapse, and how a motivated board put through an environmentally friendly initiative; service articles, such as those detailing guidelines for hiring a property management firm, illuminating group decision-making dynamics, studying implementation of solar or geothermal power, and reviewing methods of increasing building revenue; and advocacy journalism, such as stories about shoddy new construction and poor enforcement of building codes. Shorter pieces provide updates on co-op/condo legislation, judicial decisions, and policy trends.

Art contributors include illustrators Danny Hellman, Jane Sanders, Liza Donnelly, and Marcellus Hall. Regular contributing writers include Bill Morris, Jennifer V. Hughes, Mathew Hall and Frank Lovece. Tom Soter, who joined the magazine with its second issue in 1982, was editorial director until his death in 2020. The current editorial director is Paula Chin and the art director is Chad Townsend.
