= Louvre Abu Dhabi =

Art museum in Abu Dhabi, United Arab Emirates

Coordinates: 24°31′59″N 54°24′00″E

- اللوفر أبوظبي

- The Louvre Abu Dhabi
- Established: 8 November 2017; 9 years ago
- Location: Saadiyat Island, Abu Dhabi, United Arab Emirates
- Type: Art Museum
- Director: Manuel Rabaté
- Architect: Jean Nouvel
- Owner: Abu Dhabi Department of Culture & Tourism
- Website: www.louvreabudhabi.ae

The Louvre Abu Dhabi (Arabic: اللوفر أبوظبي, romanized: al-lūfr ʔabū ẓaby; French: Louvre Abou Dabi) is an art museum located on Saadiyat Island in Abu Dhabi, United Arab Emirates. It runs under an agreement between the UAE and France, signed in March 2007, that allows it to use the Louvre's name until 2047, (Note: In 2023, the term of the March 2007 agreement was extended from 2037 to 2047.) and has been described by the Louvre as "France's largest cultural project abroad." It is approximately 24,000 square metres (260,000 ft^{2}) in size, with 8,000 square metres (86,000 ft^{2}) of galleries, making it the largest art museum in the Arabian Peninsula. Artworks from around the world are showcased at the museum, with stated intent to bridge the gap between Eastern and Western art. Louvre Abu Dhabi is one of the first completed projects of the Saadiyat Cultural District, which Abu Dhabi intends to develop into "a leading destination for art, history and culture."

By 2019, the Louvre Abu Dhabi had already attracted 2 million visitors, making it the most visited museum in the Arab world.

== Location ==
The museum is part of a US$27 billion tourist and cultural development for Saadiyat Island, planned to house a cluster of world-class cultural assets.

In addition to the Louvre Abu Dhabi, these are to include: the Zayed National Museum, on a design by Foster and Partners; the Guggenheim Abu Dhabi contemporary arts museum by Frank Gehry, expected to be the world's largest Guggenheim; a performing arts centre designed by Dame Zaha Hadid; a maritime museum with concept design by Tadao Ando; and a number of arts pavilions. The Abrahamic Family House was later added to the cluster, with completion expected in 2022.

== History ==
=== Project development ===
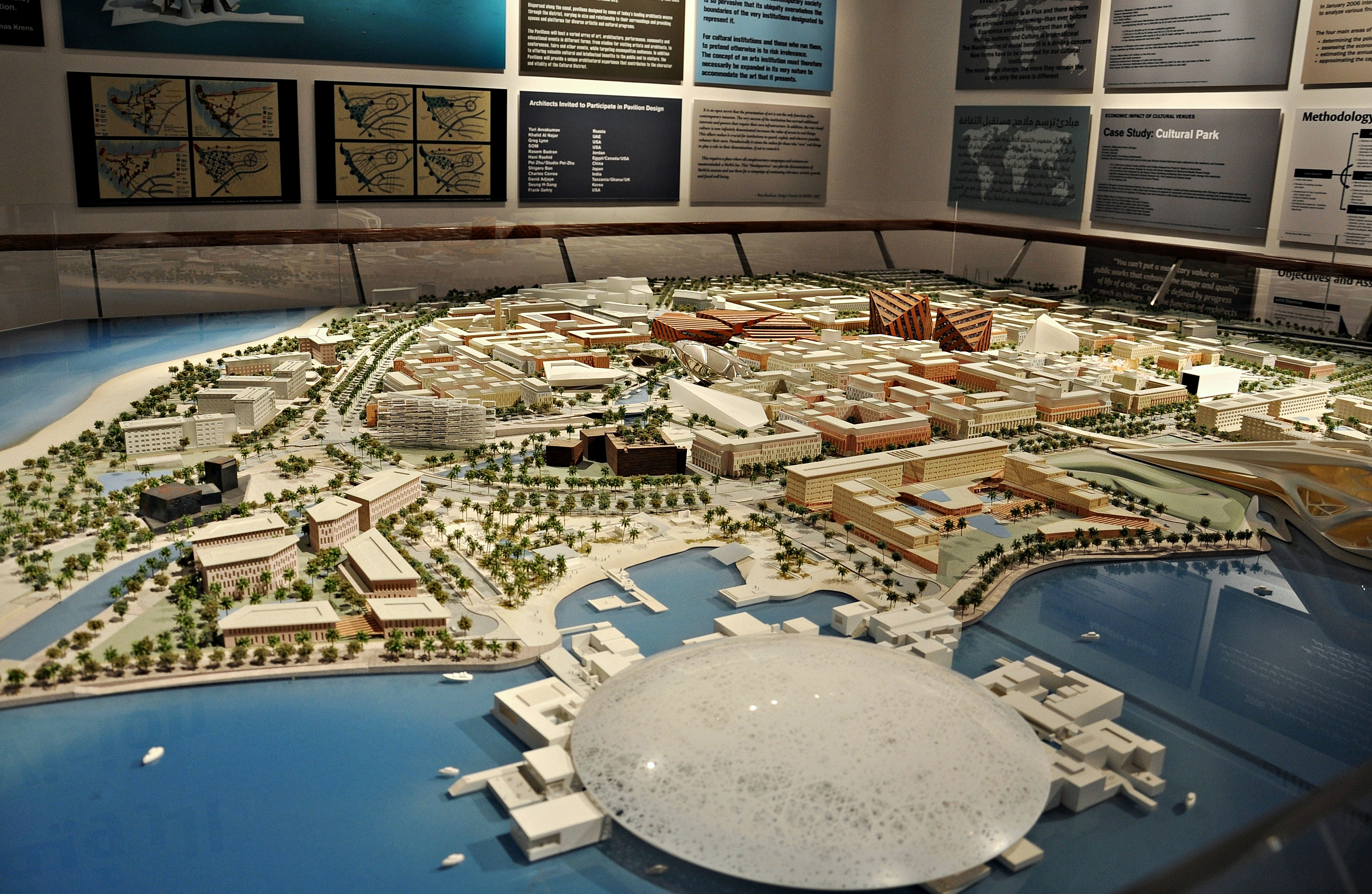
Model of the Louvre project and its surroundings, 2011

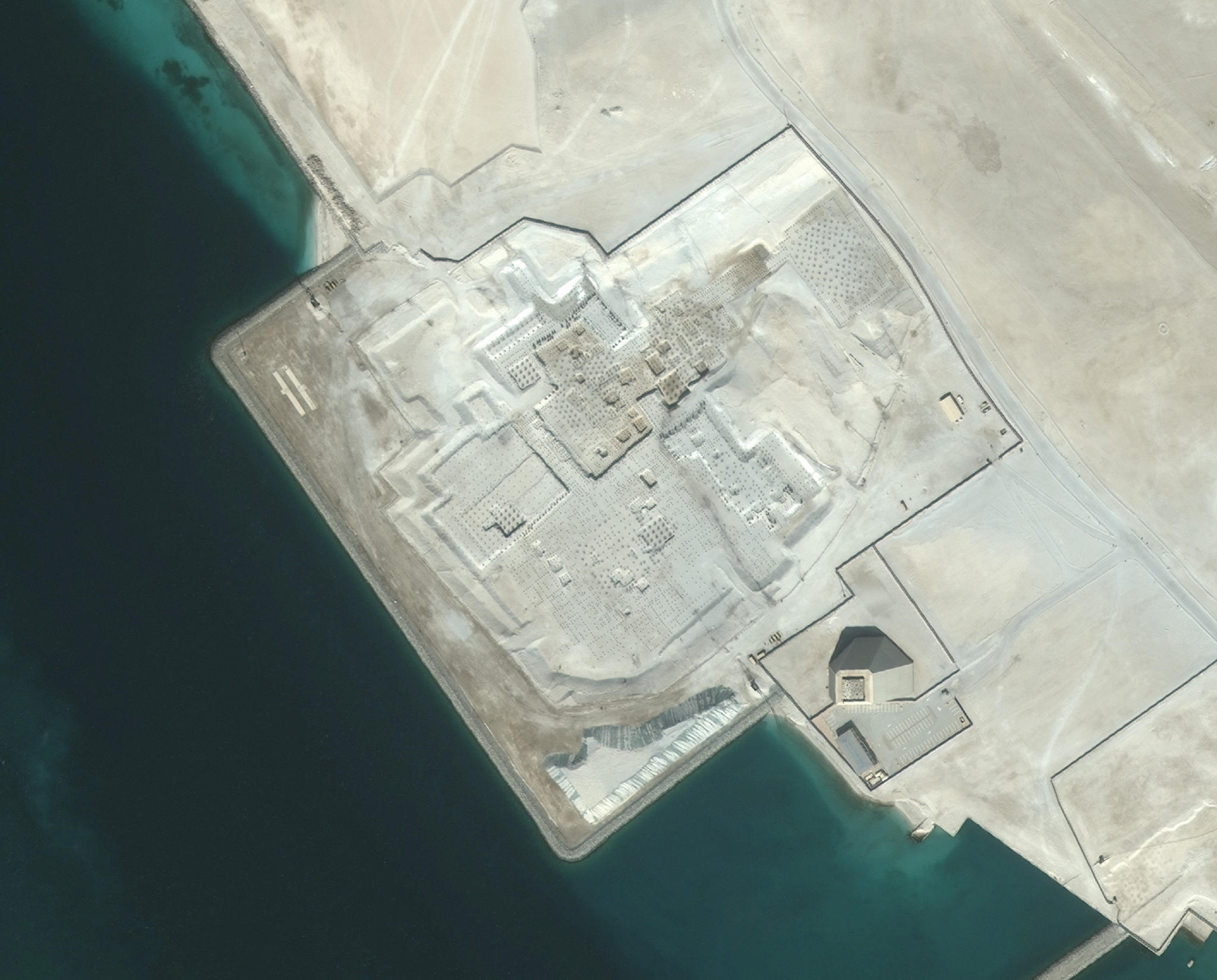
Aerial view of the museum location, early 2010s

In 2005 the United Arab Emirates put forward to the French government the idea of creating a museum in the Emirates bearing the name of the Louvre. Discussions were initiated in June 2005, when an Abu Dhabi delegation led by Sultan bin Tahnoon Al Nahyan, chairman of the Abu Dhabi Authority for Culture & Heritage visited Paris and met counterparts at the Louvre. A month later, another delegation including Abdullah bin Zayed Al Nahyan, then Minister of Information and Culture of the United Arab Emirates, discussed the project with interlocutors in the French government, including Foreign Minister Philippe Douste-Blazy and Culture Minister Renaud Donnedieu de Vabres. Also in the summer of 2005, Abu Dhabi Crown Prince Mohamed bin Zayed Al Nahyan sent a letter about the project to France's president Jacques Chirac. Formal negotiations on the project between the two countries started in the summer of 2006.

Meanwhile, the Abu Dhabi authorities in 2006 selected Jean Nouvel, known among other projects for having designed the Arab World Institute in Paris, as the building's architect. They initially commissioned his firm to design a generic museum of classical art or civilisation, without specific reference to the Louvre while discussions with the French authorities were still ongoing. The choice of Nouvel had been first suggested by Thomas Krens, then the director of the Solomon R. Guggenheim Foundation and adviser to Abu Dhabi on the development of Saadiyat Island.

The negotiations and the project itself were publicly revealed by French daily Le Monde in September 2006. The project initially generated controversy, including an op-ed and petition against it by curators Françoise Cachin, Jean Clair and Roland Recht.

Louvre director Henri Loyrette was also reported to have initially opposed the project, which in the early phase he did not defend or promote publicly. But the Louvre's position became more favorable in the course of the contract negotiation, as it managed to secure significant benefits for itself.

The agreement detailing the partnership and licensing arrangements was signed on 6 March 2007 by respective representatives of the French and UAE governments. That agreement was ratified by the French Parliament on 9 October 2007, after Jacques Chirac had been replaced as French President by Nicolas Sarkozy. Even after leaving the presidency, Chirac remained a major supporter of the project.

When announced in 2007, the museum was expected to open in 2012. On 29 October 2011, the project managing agency, Tourism Development & Investment Company (TDIC), announced that the museum's opening would be delayed but gave no new date.

According to the UAE newspapers Gulf News and The National, the delay came from a review of the emirate's economic strategy. In January 2012 it was announced that the Louvre Abu Dhabi's opening date would be 2015.

=== Construction ===
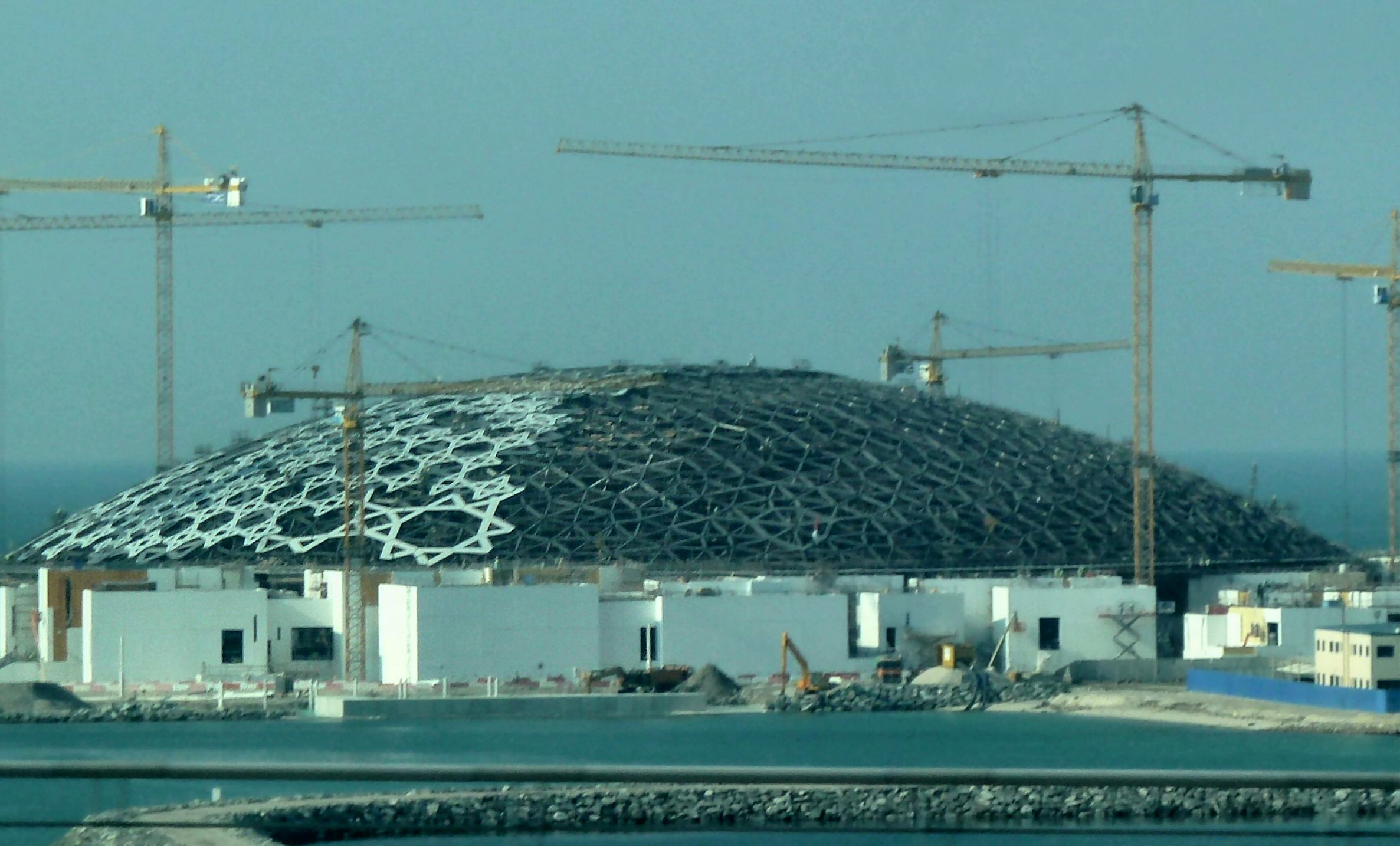
The dome under construction in January 2015

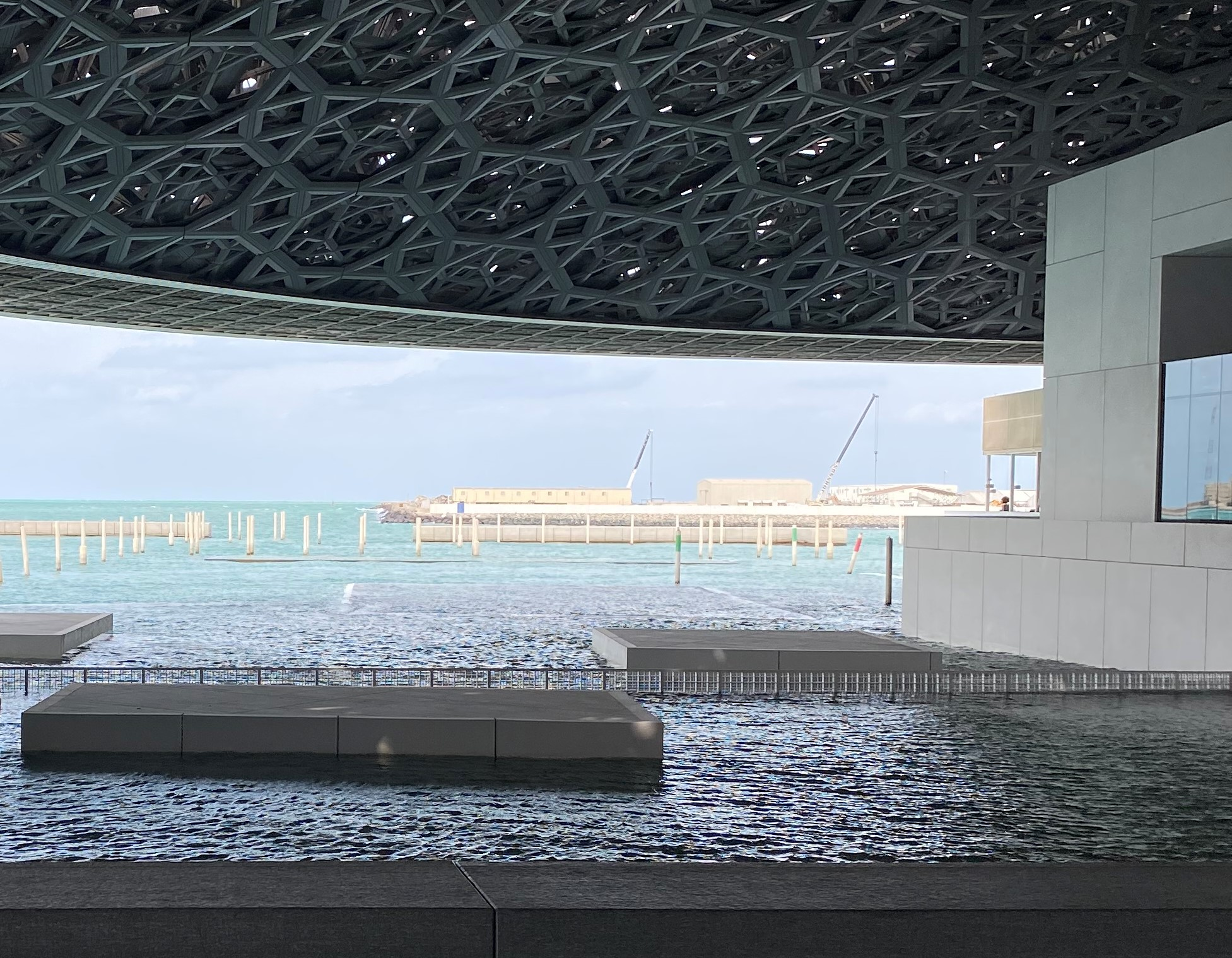
Platforms in the sea water under the Louvre's dome

Construction works at Louvre Abu Dhabi officially started on 26 May 2009. The piling and enabling works package was awarded to the German specialized company Bauer International FZE; the total of 4,536 piles in steel and reinforced concrete were completed on 3 August 2010.

Construction on the main phase of the museum began in early 2013 by a consortium headed by Arabtec, Constructora San José and Oger Abu Dhabi, under a $653 million contract. This stage included waterproofing and the two basement levels, along with four concrete pillars that will support the 7,000-tonne dome. Work on the construction of the gallery spaces and initial preparation for the dome began in the fourth quarter of 2013. On 5 December 2013, the first element of the museum's canopy was lifted into place. On 17 March 2014 TDIC announced the completion of the first permanent gallery structure to mark the first anniversary of the start of construction. At this time, it was claimed that a total of ten million man hours had been worked and 120,538 cubic meters of concrete used. On 22 September 2014, the final super-sized element in the canopy was fitted in place, marking a significant milestone in the museum's construction phase. In October, The Tourism & Development Investment Company announced that the Louvre Abu Dhabi was more than 50 percent complete.

=== Prefiguration exhibitions ===
The Louvre Abu Dhabi first started sharing its collection with the public through an exhibition at the Gallery One of the Emirates Palace, entitled "Talking Art: Louvre Abu Dhabi." It was inaugurated by Mohammed bin Zayed Al Nahyan and Nicolas Sarkozy on 26 May 2009, the same day as the construction work officially started on Saadiyat Island. The exhibition presented the first 19 acquisitions for the institution, including a Mamluk Quran from the 14th century, a 5th-century Fibula from Domagnano, a Virgin and Child by Bellini, and Mondrian's Composition with blue, red, yellow and black from 1922.

A second exhibition, "Birth of a Museum", opened at the exhibition space Manarat Al Saadiyat in May 2013, ending in August that year. The first large-scale preview of the collection, it featured 130 works acquired by the government of Abu Dhabi for the permanent collection. They included a never-before-seen work by Picasso, a Bronze Age terracotta statue from Cyprus, along with artifacts from Greece, Turkey, Japan and Syria.

In May 2014, the Birth of a Museum exhibition, featuring works shown in Abu Dhabi and a number of new acquisitions, opened at the Louvre in Paris. A number of new works were presented, including Chirisei Kyubiki by the Japanese artist Kazuo Shiraga and painted in 1960.

=== Inauguration and aftermath ===
The museum was eventually inaugurated on 8 November 2017 by French President Emmanuel Macron, Abu Dhabi Crown Prince (and de facto ruler) Mohammed bin Zayed Al Nahyan and UAE Prime Minister and Emir of Dubai Mohammed bin Rashid Al Maktoum. Other personalities present at the inauguration included Mohammed VI of Morocco and President of Afghanistan Ashraf Ghani. The museum was opened to the public three days later. It welcomed more than one million visitors in its first full year of operations, of which 30-40 percent were UAE residents and 60-70 percent from abroad (mainly France, Germany, China, the UK, the US, India and the GCC countries); this made it the 77th most visited museum worldwide in 2018.

In November 2019, the waterfront boulevard on which the museum is located on the eastern end of Saadiyat Island was named after former French President Jacques Chirac, in recognition of his role in the project and more generally in the development of links between France and the UAE.

In February 2020, a Fouquet's restaurant opened as the main catering amenity inside the museum, with a menu created in partnership with celebrity chef Pierre Gagnaire.

== Design ==
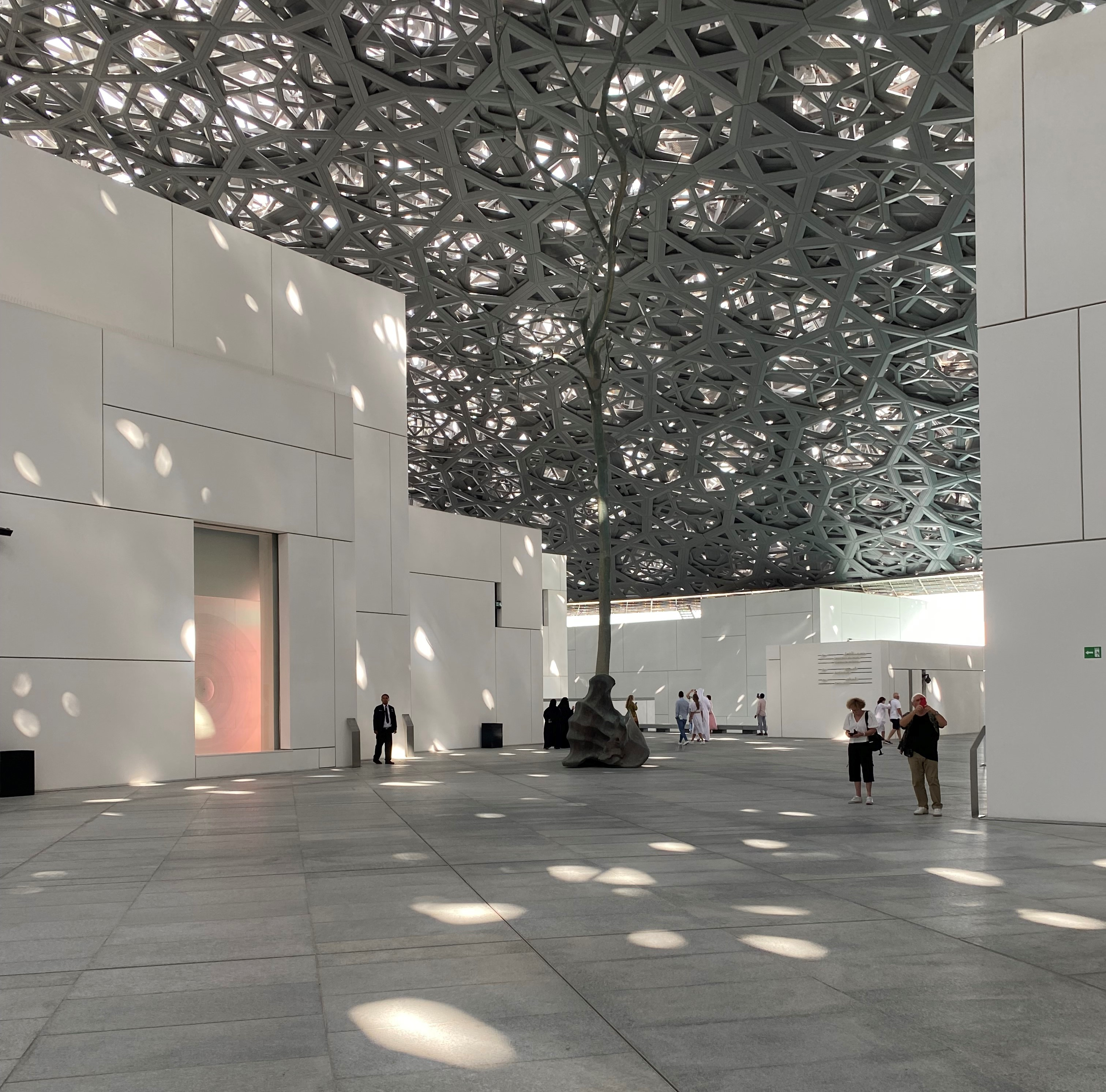
The central space under the building's dome, with Giuseppe Penone's Leaves of Light

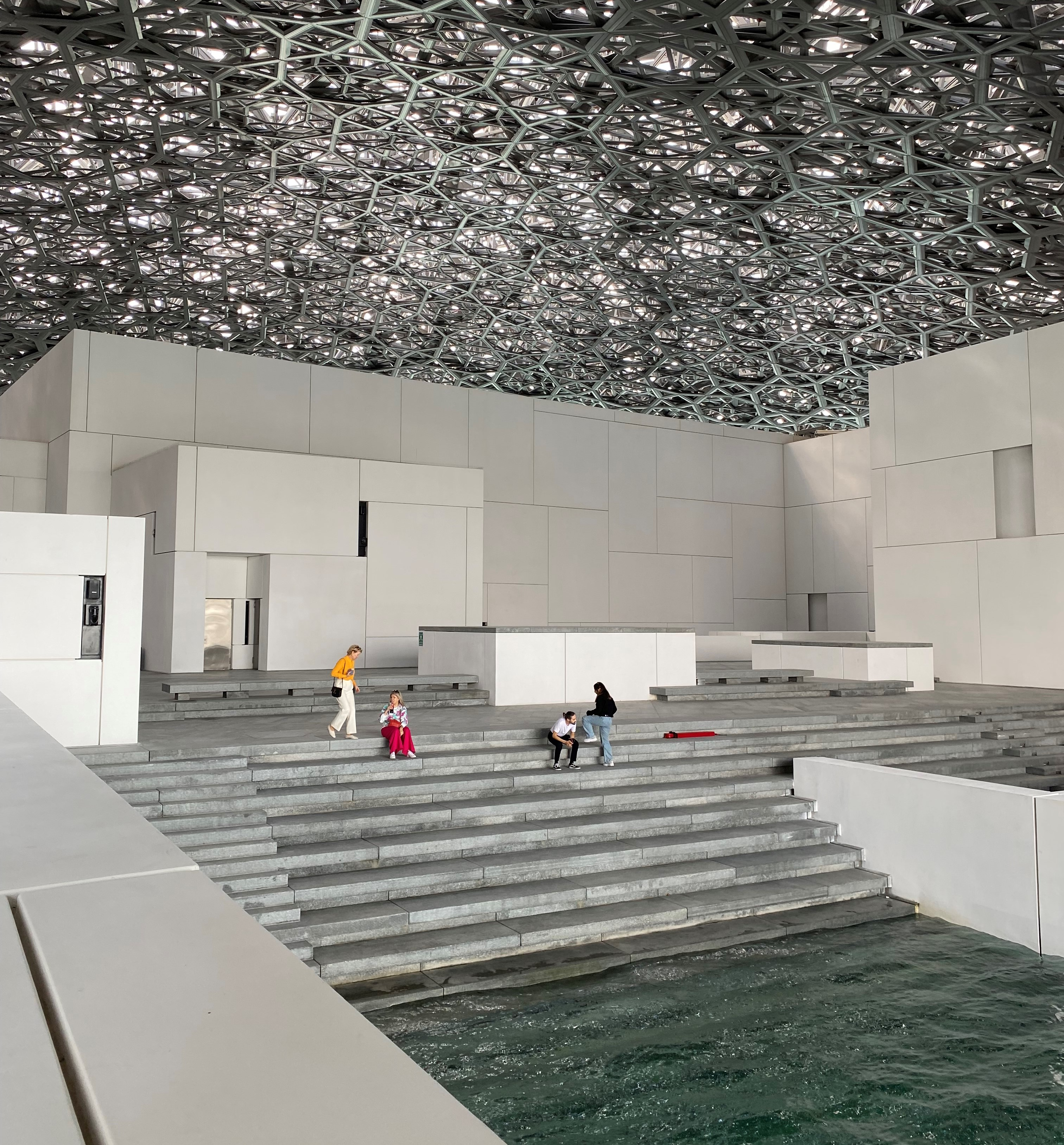
Water and light under the dome

=== Architecture ===
During the initial Concept Design phase in 2006–2007, Jean Nouvel and his team designed the museum as a "seemingly floating dome structure"; its web-patterned dome allowing the sun to filter through. The overall effect is meant to represent "rays of sunlight passing through date palm fronds in an oasis." The total area of the museum will be approximately 24,000 square metres (260,000 ft^{2}). The permanent collection will occupy 6,000 square metres (65,000 ft^{2}), and the temporary exhibitions will take place over 2,000 square metres (22,000 ft^{2}).

=== Engineering ===
The engineers were BuroHappold Engineering, who provided multidisciplinary engineering services across the project. Their structural engineers realised the "floating dome" from 7,850 aluminium stars of varying sizes, which tessellate over eight layers to create a perforated roof structure that allows sunlight through to the spaces below. A team of specialist geotechnical and water engineers designed a watertight basement and tidal pools within the galleries to give the illusion of a "museum in the sea" while protecting artwork, artefacts and visitors from the corrosive marine environment. Guests who visit the museum can discover the 55 buildings of which 23 are art galleries and are constructed to look like the low-rise home of the region.

=== Wayfinding ===
The three-languages wayfinding system for the Louvre Abu Dhabi was designed by Philippe Apeloig, and is implemented in both Arabic and Roman script. Frutiger LT typeface has been chosen for the Roman texts for its perfect readability for signage; while Lebanese designer Kristyan Sarkis created an Arabic bespoke typeface, the LAD Arabic, based on the classic Naskh style and his Colvert Arabic font. The design of the pictograms was inspired by the museum's architecture, and particularly by the abstract shapes created by the rain of light filtering through the dome. Each pictogram is a combination of several of these shapes, creating silhouettes and objects.

=== Public art ===
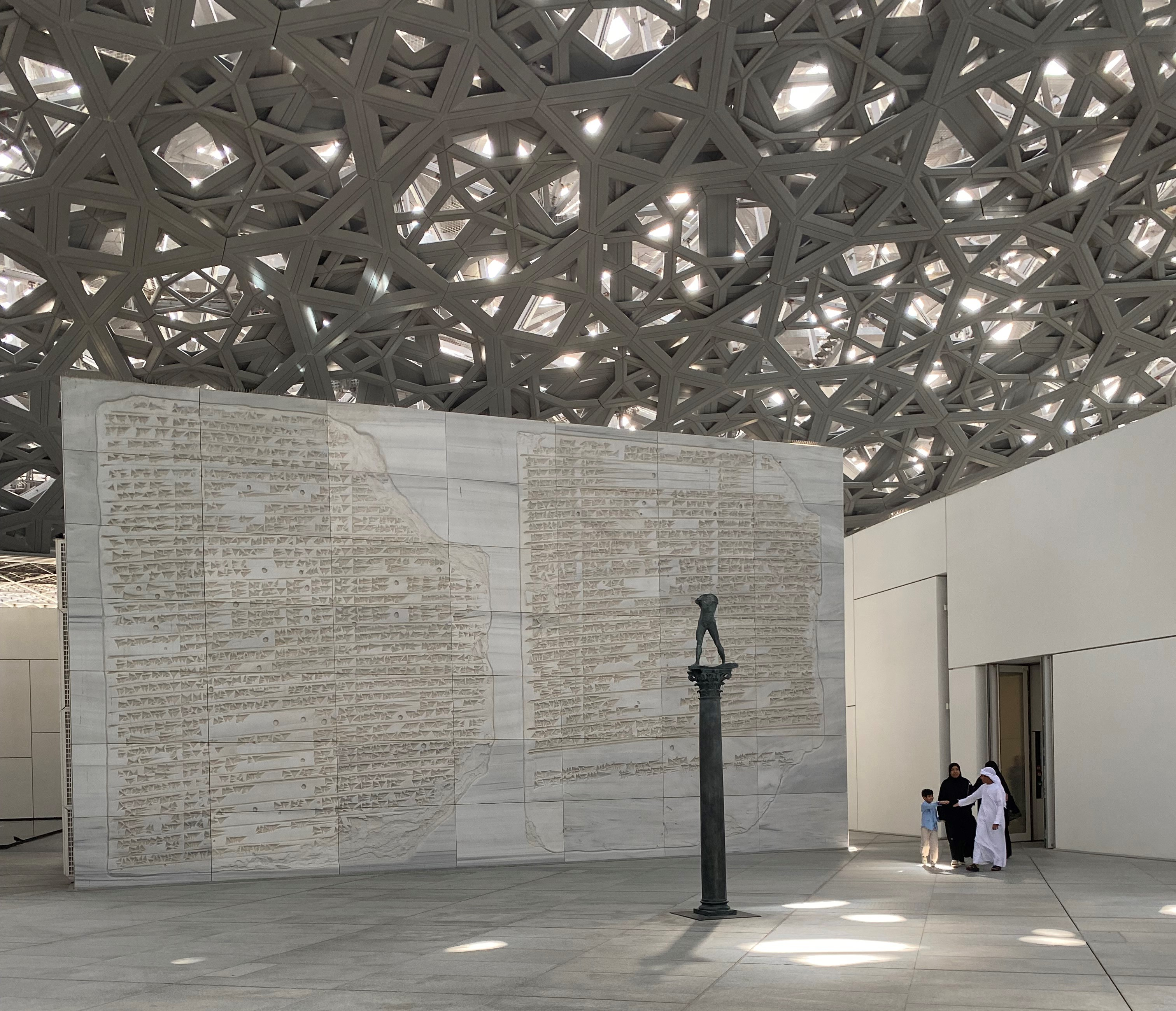
Detail of For Louvre Abu Dhabi, sculpture by Jenny Holzer: Cuneiform script, with a cast of Auguste Rodin's The Walking Man in front

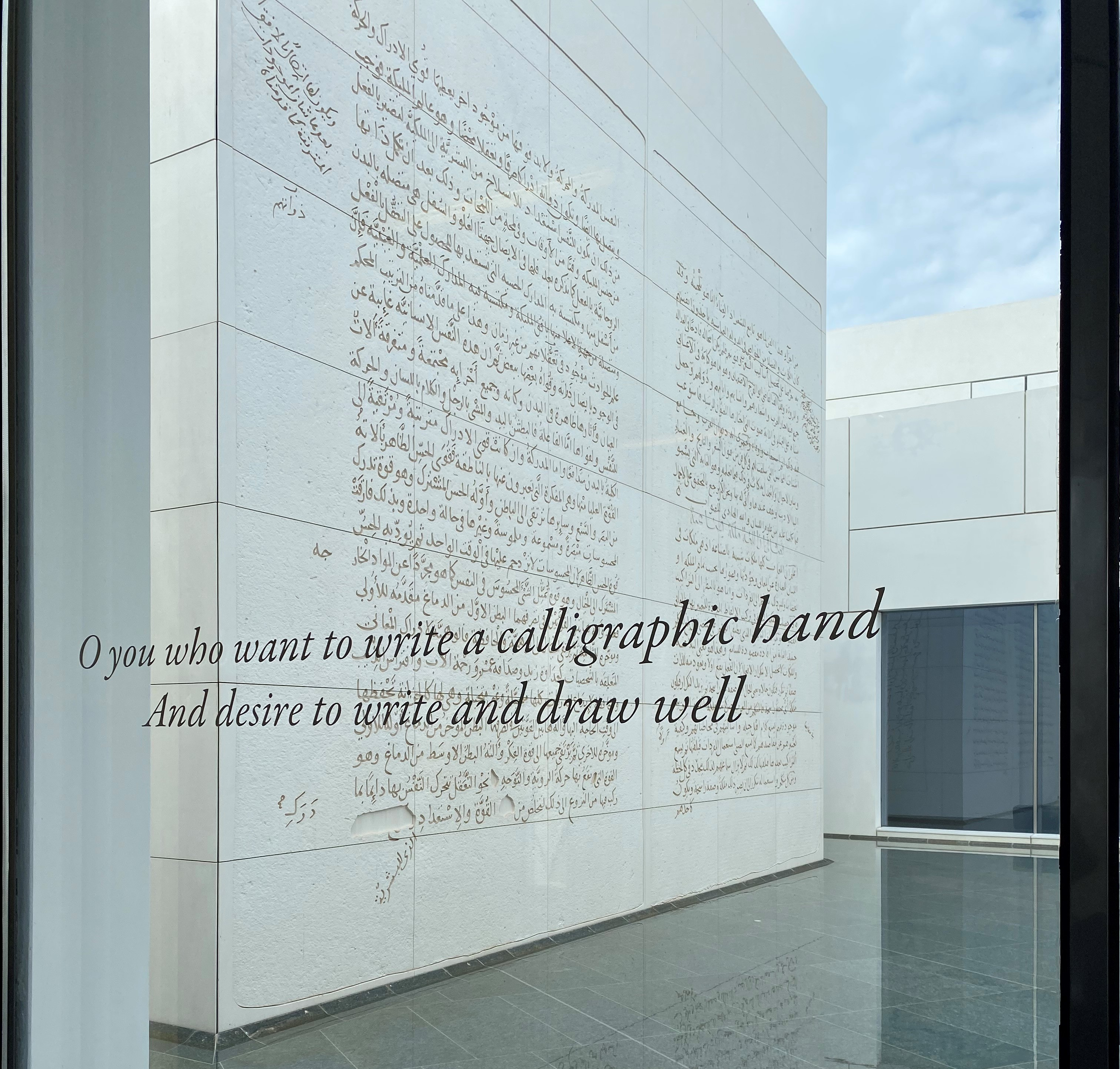
Detail of For Louvre Abu Dhabi: Arabic script

Two works of public art have been commissioned for the building's opening:

- A monumental sculpture in white limestone from Marbella by American artist Jenny Holzer, in one of the building courtyards covered by the dome, with large-scale engraved facsimiles of excerpts from texts in three different scripts: a bilingual Sumerian and Akkadian creation myth (ca. 2000 BCE), in Cuneiform, from a clay tablet held at the Vorderasiatisches Museum Berlin; Muqaddimah, by Ibn Khaldun (14th century), in Arabic and Arabic script, from a manuscript held at the Atif Efendi Library in Istanbul; and Michel de Montaigne's Essays in French (16th century), in Latin script, from a printed version held at the Bordeaux municipal library with handwritten annotations by the author.
- Germination, an installation by Giuseppe Penone in three parts: Leaves of Light, a tall bronze tree under the dome; Propagation, a panel of concentric circles in porcelain that is based on the fingerprint of UAE founding father Zayed bin Sultan Al Nahyan; and Earth of the World, a composition in pottery using various clays all sourced in the UAE.

== Permanent collections ==
Questions have been raised as to the nature of the artworks to be displayed at the museum. However, according to The National: "the type and nature of the exhibits planned for the Louvre Abu Dhabi have been affected to no extent by the fact the new museum would be in a Muslim country, said Mr. Loyrette."

Subjects and themes have been freely discussed with our partners in Abu Dhabi and no request to avoid such subjects has been made. The exhibition policy will be set up regarding excellence and high-standard quality. As a new museum we hope the Louvre Abu Dhabi will be part of the international community.

— Henri Loyrette

It has been noted that the museum will showcase work from multiple French museums, including the Louvre, the Centre Georges Pompidou, the Musée d'Orsay and Palace of Versailles. However, Renaud Donnedieu de Vabres, the French Minister of Culture, stated at the announcement that the Paris Louvre "would not sell any of its 35,000-piece collection currently on display".

It will not be dedicated to occidental art but will show all kinds of artistic creations. It will set up a dialogue between west and east, between north and south. As such, art from the Middle East will be shown within the Louvre Abu Dhabi.

— Henri Loyrette

In 2012, the Louvre Abu Dhabi started collecting photography, making its first acquisitions in the field, including works by Joseph-Philibert Girault de Prangey, Roger Fenton and George Wilson Bridges. The museum also acquired a sculpture of a Bactrian princess dating from the third millennium BC, a pavement and fountain set from the early Ottoman period, as well as the paintings Breton Boys Wrestling (1888) by Paul Gauguin and The Subjugated Reader (1928) by René Magritte.

Further details of the museum's collection on opening were revealed in October 2014, with a number of important works to be loaned including Leonardo da Vinci's La Belle Ferronnière and works by Henri Matisse, a self-portrait by Vincent van Gogh, Jacques-Louis David's Napoleon Crossing the Alps and Claude Monet's Gare Saint-Lazare.

The Museum tweeted 8 December 2017 that it was looking forward to displaying the Salvator Mundi by Leonardo da Vinci. The work was acquired, at a record price for a painting, by the Department of Culture & Tourism of Abu Dhabi for the museum. No date was set for the display of this work but in September 2018, the unveiling was indefinitely postponed and a January 2019 news report indicated that "no one knows where it is, and there are grave concerns for its physical safety".

=== Selected exhibits from the Louvre Abu Dhabi's permanent collection ===
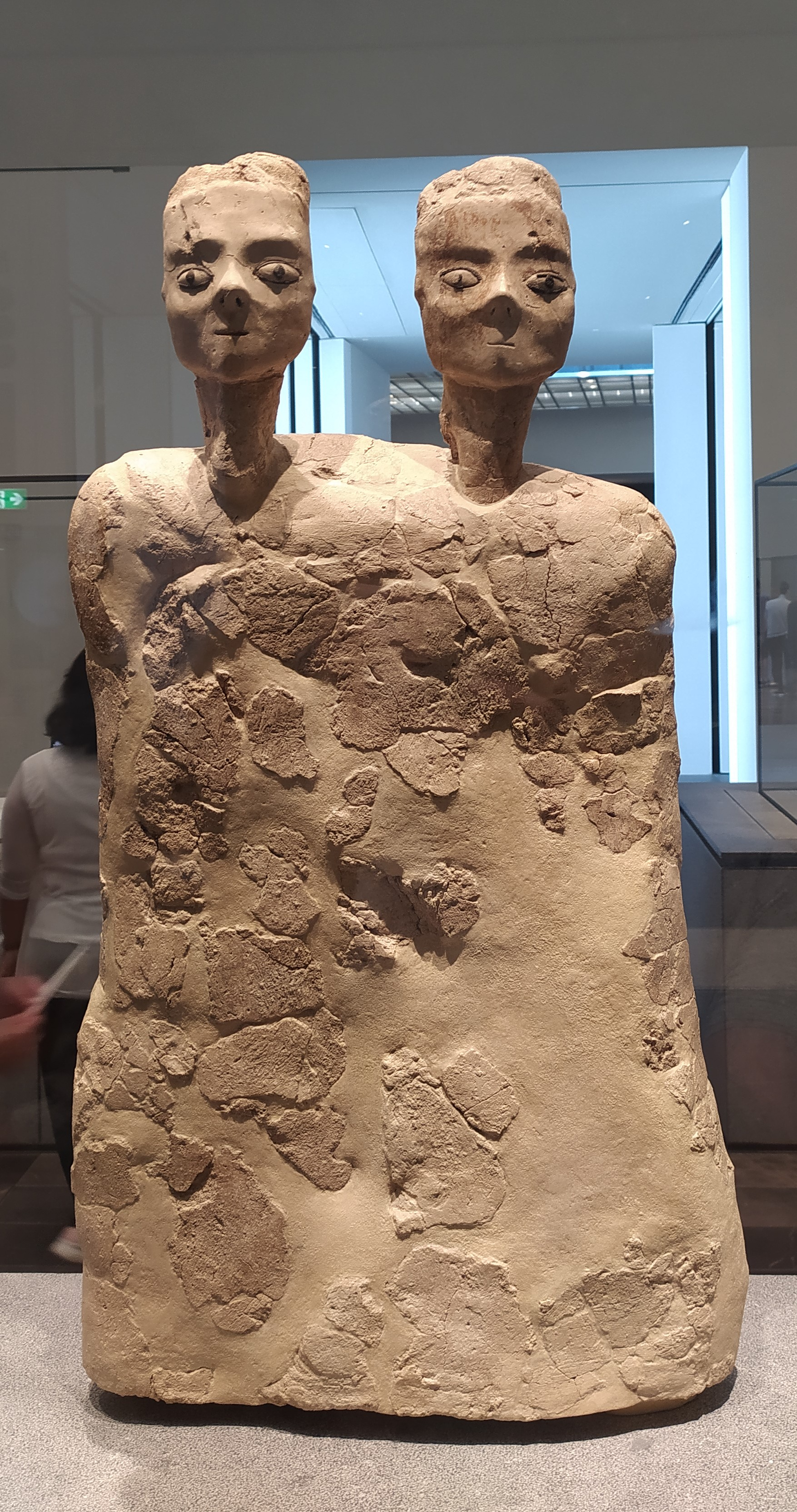
8,000-year-old statues from ʿAin Ghazal, Jordan

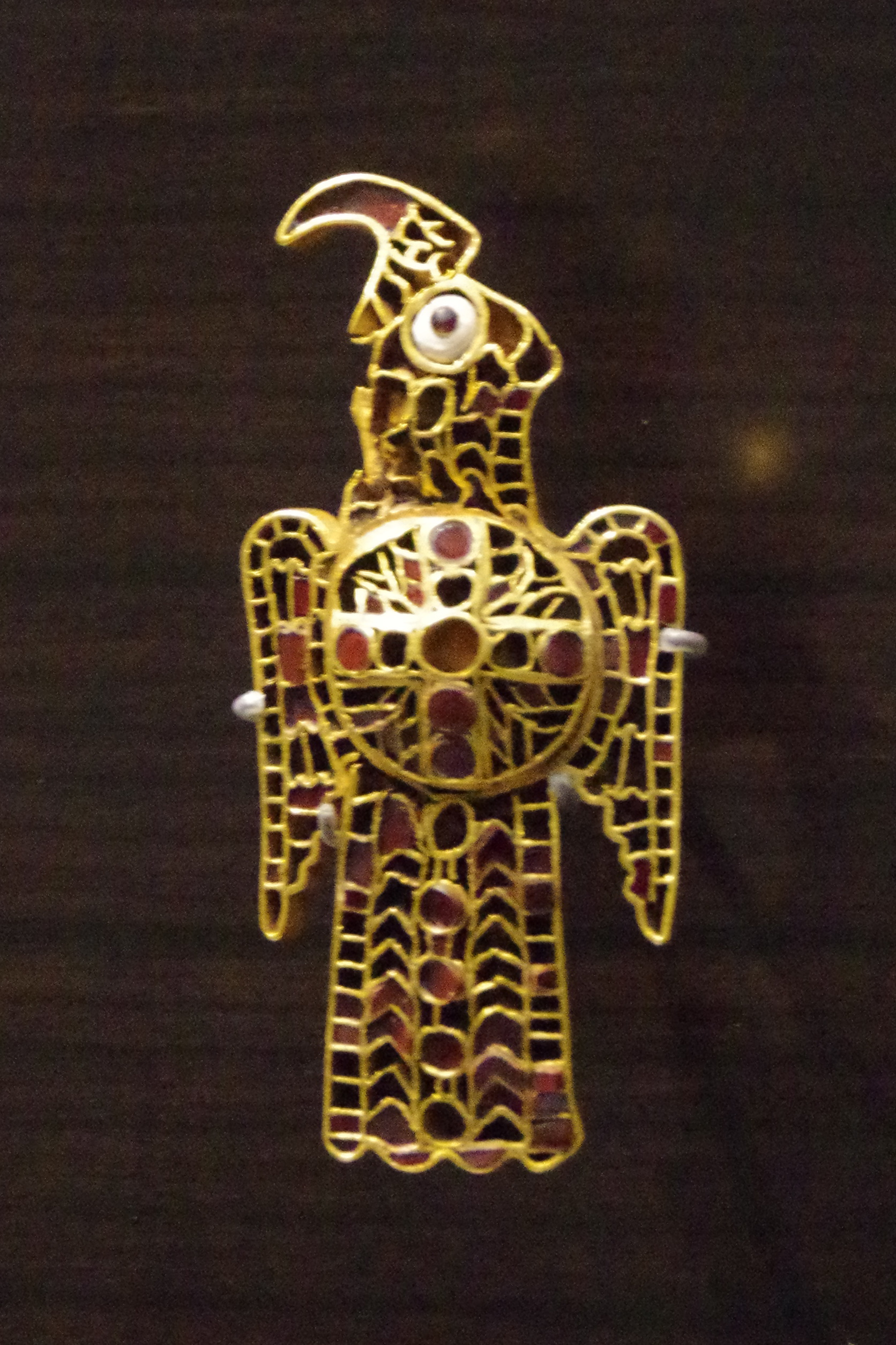
Fibula from Domagnano Treasure, San Marino, 5th century

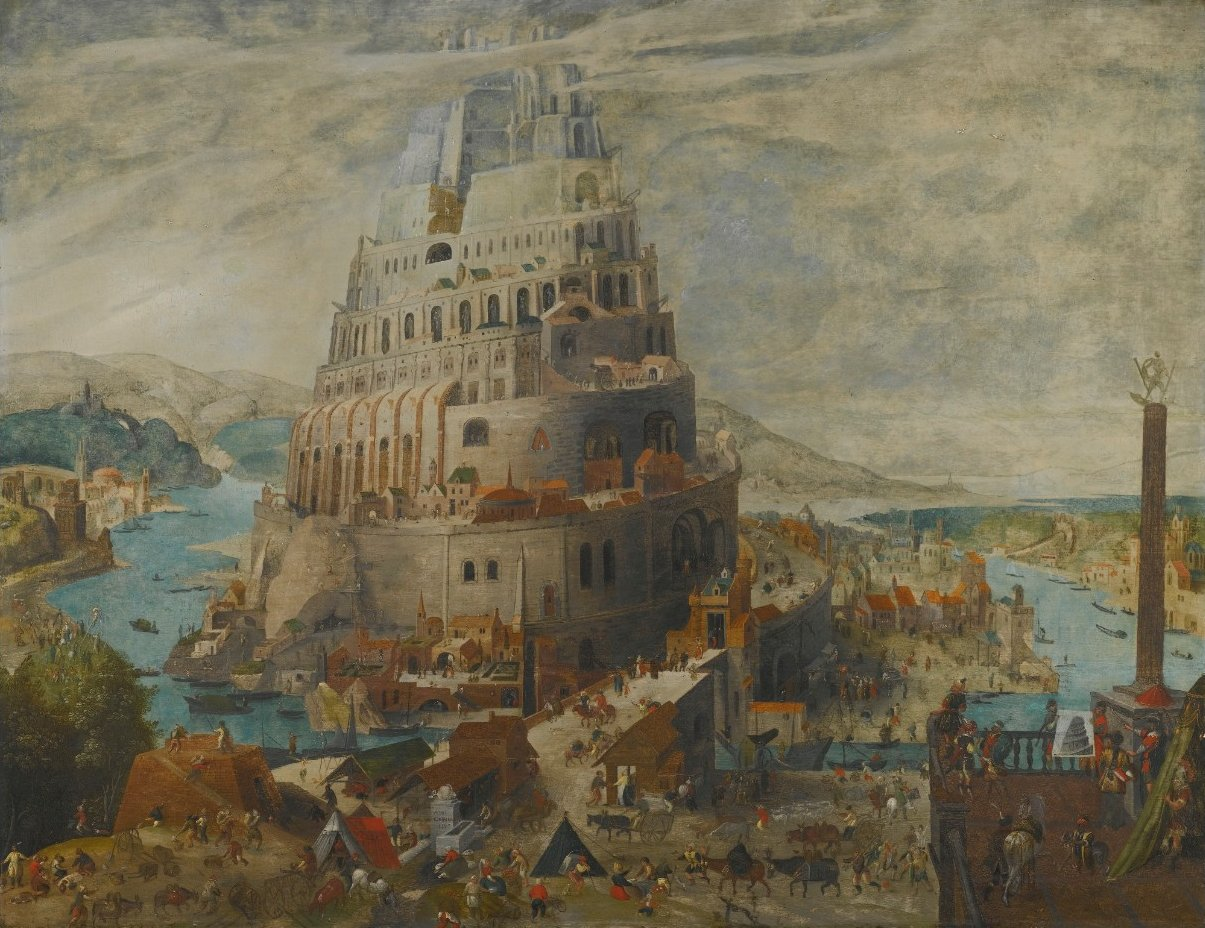
The Tower of Babel, by Abel Grimmer (1595)

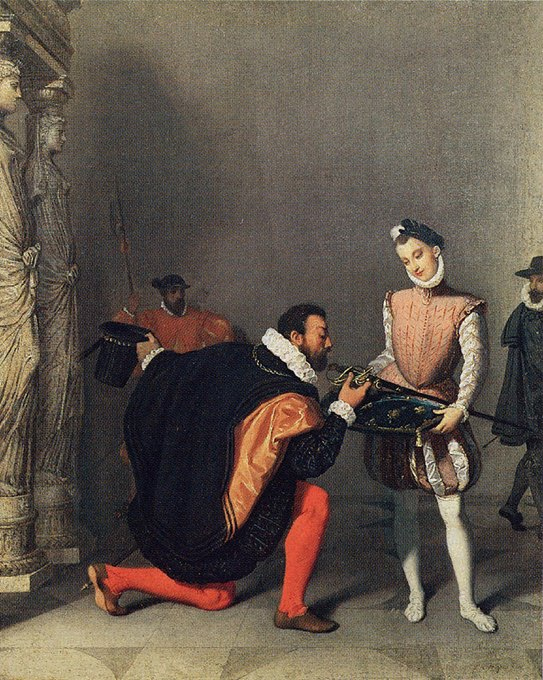
Don Pedro de Tolède kissing the sword of Henry IV (1820), by Jean-Auguste-Dominique Ingres

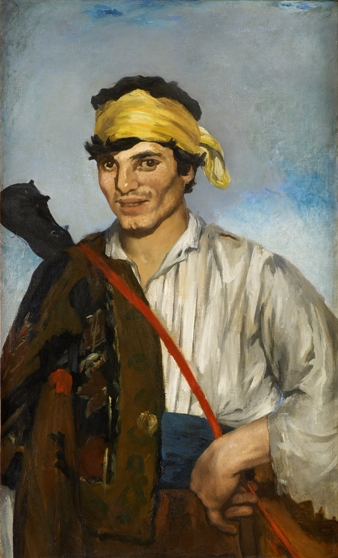
Le Bohémien (1861–62), by Édouard Manet

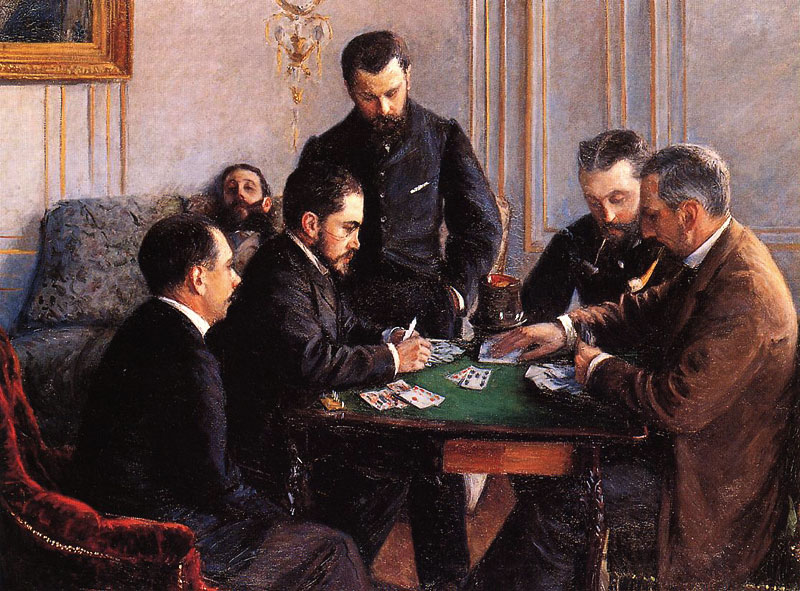
The Bezique Game, Gustave Caillebotte

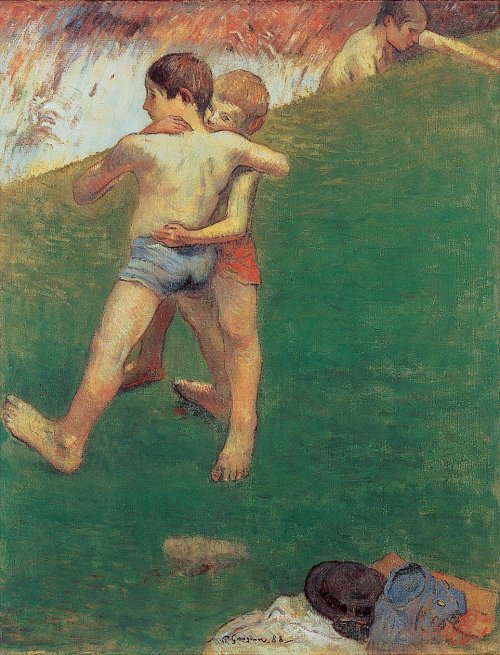
Young boys fighting, by Paul Gauguin

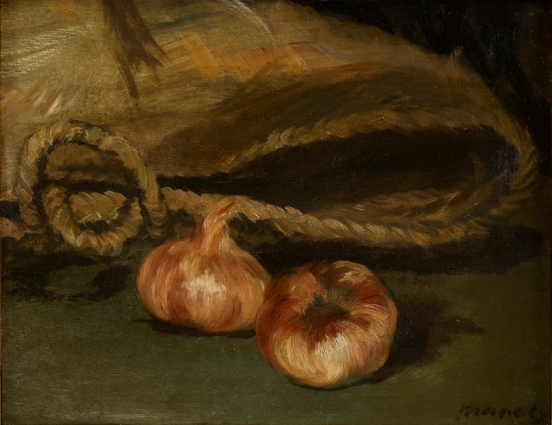
Still life with tote bag and garlic, by Édouard Manet

== Legal basis, management and programs ==
The Louvre Abu Dhabi is a national museum of the UAE, overseen by the Abu Dhabi Department of Culture & Tourism. As of 2019, half of the museum's staff were UAE nationals.

Whereas the Louvre Abu Dhabi is an Emirati entity separate from the Louvre in Paris, the two are linked by a thirty-year agreement that was signed in March 2007 by the two governments and covers a number of areas, including the license of the Louvre name until 2037. The text of the agreement was published by the French authorities for its parliamentary ratification. That agreement foresaw the establishment by the French side of a private-sector project entity, which was subsequently incorporated on 23 August 2007 and named Agence France-Muséums (AFM). AFM's shareholders include the Louvre, with over a third of equity capital, and a number of other French cultural institutions: the Musée du Quai Branly, Centre Pompidou, Musée d'Orsay, National Estate of Versailles, Guimet Museum, Musée Rodin, Château de Chambord, Réunion des Musées Nationaux, Opérateur du patrimoine et des projets immobiliers de la culture, École du Louvre and Bibliothèque nationale de France. The Musée de Cluny and Palace of Fontainebleau, while not shareholders of AFM, have also been among the project's beneficiaries.

AFM was initially chaired by French financier and philanthropist Marc Ladreit de Lacharrière and led by Bruno Maquart, former head of the Centre Georges Pompidou, as its executive director. In January 2008, AFM and Ministry of Culture Christine Albanel signed another agreement with Sultan bin Tahnoon al-Nahyan, chairman of the Abu Dhabi Authority for Culture & Heritage.

Under the March 2007 agreement, Abu Dhabi is to pay the following: €400 million for the use of the Louvre name, €190 million for art loans (ending in 2027), €75 million for special exhibitions (ending in 2032), €165 million for management advice and support, and €25 million for naming a space inside the Louvre in Paris after UAE founding father Zayed bin Sultan Al Nahyan. With inflation taken into account, a French Senate report in 2017 estimated the total amount of payments over the duration of the contract (2007–2037) at €974.5 million. As of 2017 (included), according to the French Senate, the cumulated payments had reached €477 million, broadly in line with the initial agreement's provisions despite the delays in project execution.

The March 2007 agreement prohibits the creation of any similar operation with the name of the Louvre in any of the other emirates of the UAE, Saudi Arabia, Kuwait, Oman, Bahrain, Qatar, Egypt, Jordan, Syria, Lebanon, Iran, or Iraq.

The space to be named after the UAE founding father was initially expected to be in a refurbished part of the Pavillon de Flore that was to display international art, but that project was later abandoned and the Sheikh Zayed Center eventually opened in 2016 as a set of three rooms in the Pavillon de l'Horloge dedicated to the history of the Louvre Palace.

In the project's early years, frictions appeared between the various French stakeholders, partly over the sharing of roughly half of total payments (€420 million in total) that were not unambiguously directed at the Louvre. The conflicts led to the departure of AFM's first director Bruno Maquart in 2010, who was not immediately replaced. Manuel Rabaté, formerly a senior administrator at the Musée du Quai Branly in Paris, was the agency's general secretary from 2010 to 2013, then chief executive from 2013 to 2016, and in September 2016 was appointed the Louvre Abu Dhabi's first director. Also in September 2016, Hissa Al Dhaheri, a UAE national, was appointed the museum's deputy director; she had joined the project team in 2010.

The Louvre Abu Dhabi has also been working with the Paris Sorbonne University Abu Dhabi to set up a master's program for museum professionals to train them and help them respond to local needs. It also runs an ambassadors programme, where representatives include poet Shamma Al Bastaki. It has developed a number of outreach initiatives to engage with new publics, including a Children's Museum, a roadside "Highway Gallery" on the Dubai-Abu Dhabi expressway, and kayaking tours around the museum building.

In 2023, the term of the March 2007 agreement was extended from 2037 to 2047, for an additional pay of €165 million.

== Influence ==
In a late-2021 joint interview, Louvre President-Director Laurence des Cars and Centre Pompidou President Laurent Le Bon, both recently appointed to their positions, cited the Louvre Abu Dhabi as "the great model" for their planned endeavor to develop more initiatives in common between their respective institutions and the Musée d'Orsay, taking inspiration from the Abu Dhabi museum's seamless chronological approach across geographies, and moving away from the ring-fencing of different eras between the Louvre (pre-1848), Orsay (1848–1914) and Pompidou (after 1914).

== Controversies ==
=== Motivations for the project ===
The museum has sparked opposition to the expansion of the Louvre name in both artistic and academic circles in France. The opposition that has surfaced in France is led by art historian Didier Rykner, who is considered one of the most outspoken critics of the French–Emirati museum deal. An online petition against the deal, signed by 4,650 curators, archaeologists and art historians, has insisted that French museums are not for sale. Klaus-Dieter Lehmann, the president of the Prussian Cultural Heritage Foundation, characterized the Louvre as behaving "like a corporation with a clearly-defined strategy: profit maximization."

According to the New York Times, Henri Loyrette, the president and director of the Louvre, responded to the criticism of the museum's policy of establishing footholds abroad, arguing that the Louvre cannot ignore the "internationalization" of museums. French minister of culture, Renaud Donnedieu de Vabres, defended the French government's decision to expand the Louvre to Abu Dhabi, explaining that it helps to enhance the image of France abroad while investing in French culture through revenues generated by the deal. The United Arab Emirates president Sheikh Khalifa bin Zayed Al Nahyan stated that the museum is a milestone in international cooperation and strengthens longstanding friendly ties between France and the United Arab Emirates.

=== Treatment of construction workers ===
Human Rights Watch reported issues during construction of Louvre Abu Dhabi including the confiscation of workers passports resulting in forced labour conditions. High "recruitment loans" paid by migrant workers to construction companies still had not been repaid as of 2019, according to government-paid monitors. 86% of these fees were over $2,000. The Human Rights Watch report welcomed improvements in the law made by the UAE since their previous report in 2009 such as the introduction of minimum standards for workers accommodation. Amid these reports, Jean Nouvel, the architect of Louvre Abu Dhabi defended the treatment of the construction workers, claiming that the conditions of construction workers were better than some European countries.

=== Western curatorial bias ===
The museum has been criticized for not fulfilling its stated intent of balancing western and eastern cultural and artistic perspectives, particularly in its collections of modern and contemporary art which exhibit a marked European focus. This bias, however, may erode over time as loans from French museums are gradually replaced by purchases made by the Louvre Abu Dhabi on its own.

== See also ==
- Guggenheim Abu Dhabi
- Zayed National Museum
- Natural History Museum Abu Dhabi
- List of largest art museums
- Louvre-Lens
