= Cityscape (disambiguation) =

A cityscape is the urban equivalent of a landscape.

Cityscape may also refer to:

- Cityscape (Claus Ogerman and Michael Brecker album), 1982
- Cityscape (David "Fathead" Newman album), 2006
- Cityscape Abu Dhabi, a real estate event
- CityScape (Phoenix), a development in Downtown Phoenix
- Cityscape (Dungeons & Dragons)
- Cityscape (horse) (born 2006), Thoroughbred racehorse
- 4D Cityscape, a series of jigsaw puzzles
- Cityscape (2019 film), a Canadian experimental short documentary film
- Scenes of City Life, a 1935 Chinese film also referred to as Cityscape in English
- Cityscape, an academic journal published by the Office of Policy Development and Research
