= ADNEC Group =

ADNEC Group مجموعة أدنيك
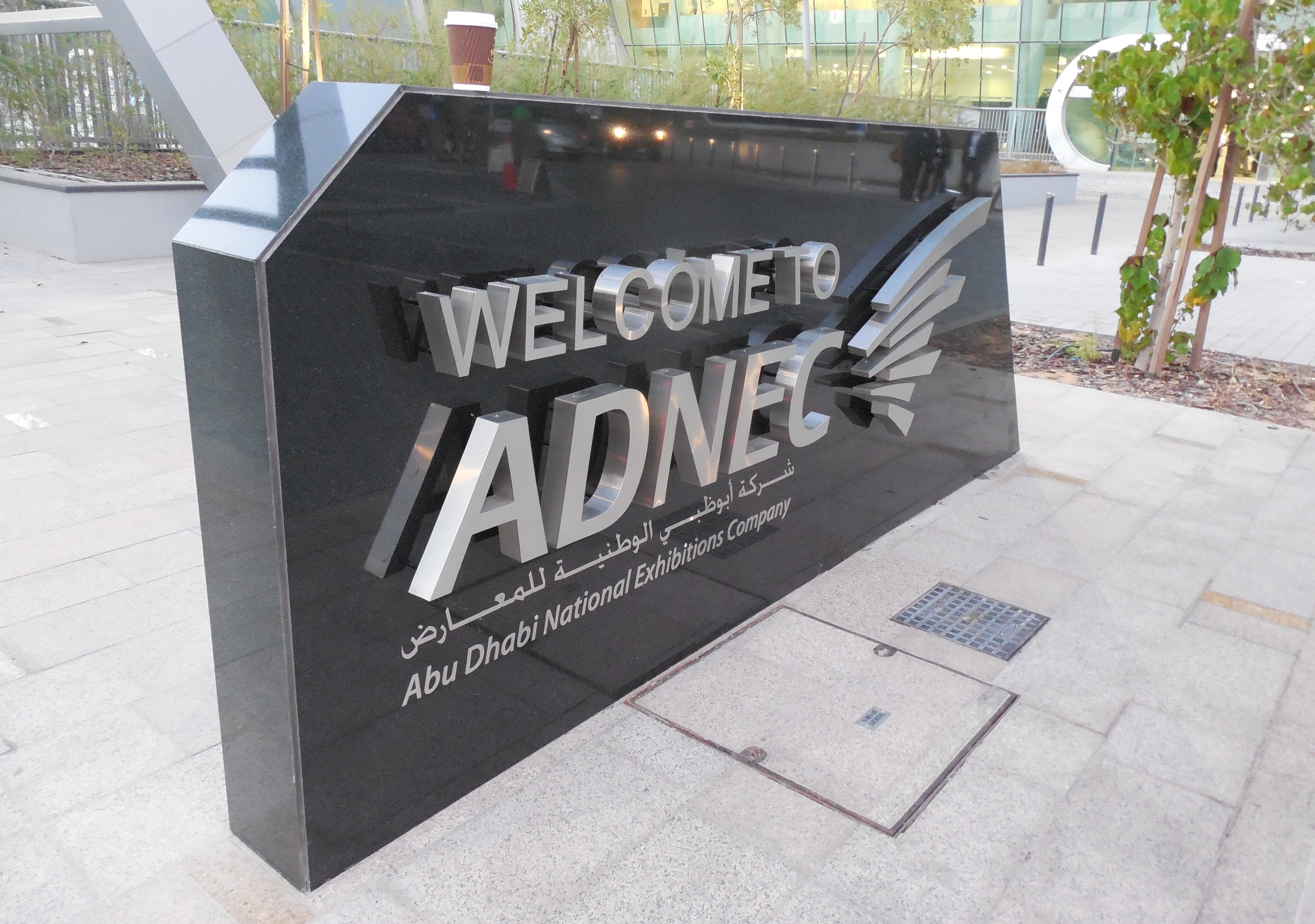
- Company type: Private
- Founded: August 2005
- Headquarters: Abu Dhabi, UAE
- Key people: H.E. Noura Mohammed Helal Al Kaabi (Chairwoman); Humaid Al Dhaheri(Acting Group CEO)
- Website: www.adnecgroup.ae

ADNEC Group is a company which owns and operates the ADNEC Centre Abu Dhabi, the largest exhibition venue in the Middle East. It is an international venue development and business management company, overseeing the ADNEC Centre Abu Dhabi, ExCeL London, the ADNEC Centre Al Ain, Capital Gate, Aloft Abu Dhabi, Aloft London ExCeL, DoubleTree By Hilton London ExCel, Anantara Sir Bani Yas Island Abu Dhabi Resort, Qasr Al Sarab Desert Resort by Anantara, Tourism 365, Capital Events, Capital Hospitality and ADNEC Services.

ADNEC is part of ADQ, a sovereign wealth fund and one of the MENA region's largest holding companies.

== History ==
ADNEC was established in August 2005 under a decree issued by His Highness Sheikh Khalifa Bin Zayed Al Nahyan, President of the UAE and Ruler of Abu Dhabi. ADNEC's initial task was to develop a venue that would replace the old Abu Dhabi International Exhibition Center and attract more meetings, incentives, conferences and events into the emirate.

== Foundation partners ==
Four international exhibition organizing companies, IIR Middle East, Reed Exhibitions, CMP Information, and dmg world media, have signed up for long-term agreements for shows at ADNEC's Exhibition Centre.

== Venue portfolio ==
ADNEC's venue portfolio includes the following:

=== Abu Dhabi National Exhibition Centre ===
Located in the UAE's capital city, the Abu Dhabi National Exhibition Centre was inaugurated in February 2007 by His Highness Sheikh Khalifa Bin Zayed Al Nahyan, President of the UAE and Ruler of Abu Dhabi. The venue has a diverse yearly calendar of over 100 events, such as the International Defense Exhibition & Conference (IDEX) and the World Future Energy Summit (WFES), the Abu Dhabi International Petroleum Exhibition & Conference (ADIPEC), Cityscape Abu Dhabi, and the Abu Dhabi International Hunting and Equestrian Exhibition.

In October 2009, the 7,920 m^{2} (85,300 sq ft) multi-purpose Hall 12 was fitted with a retractable tiered seating system, which when activated can seat almost 6,000 spectators and transforms the area into the UAE's largest indoor auditorium.

==== Capacity and usage figures ====
The Abu Dhabi National Exhibition Centre has a 73,000 m^{2} (790,000 sq ft) of live event space where more than 100 events are staged every year which are visited by 1.8 million annual visitors. The number of visitors increases by approximately 20% per year. Parking capacity for up to 6,000 vehicles is provided. There are 12 interconnected Halls totaling 55,000 m^{2} (590,000 sq ft) of exhibition space with a 18,000 m^{2} (190,000 sq ft) Visitor Concourse and a 3,000 m^{2} (32,000 sq ft) Atrium. There are 10 fully furnished Capital Suites which can each accommodate meetings of up to 30 people.

=== ExCeL London ===
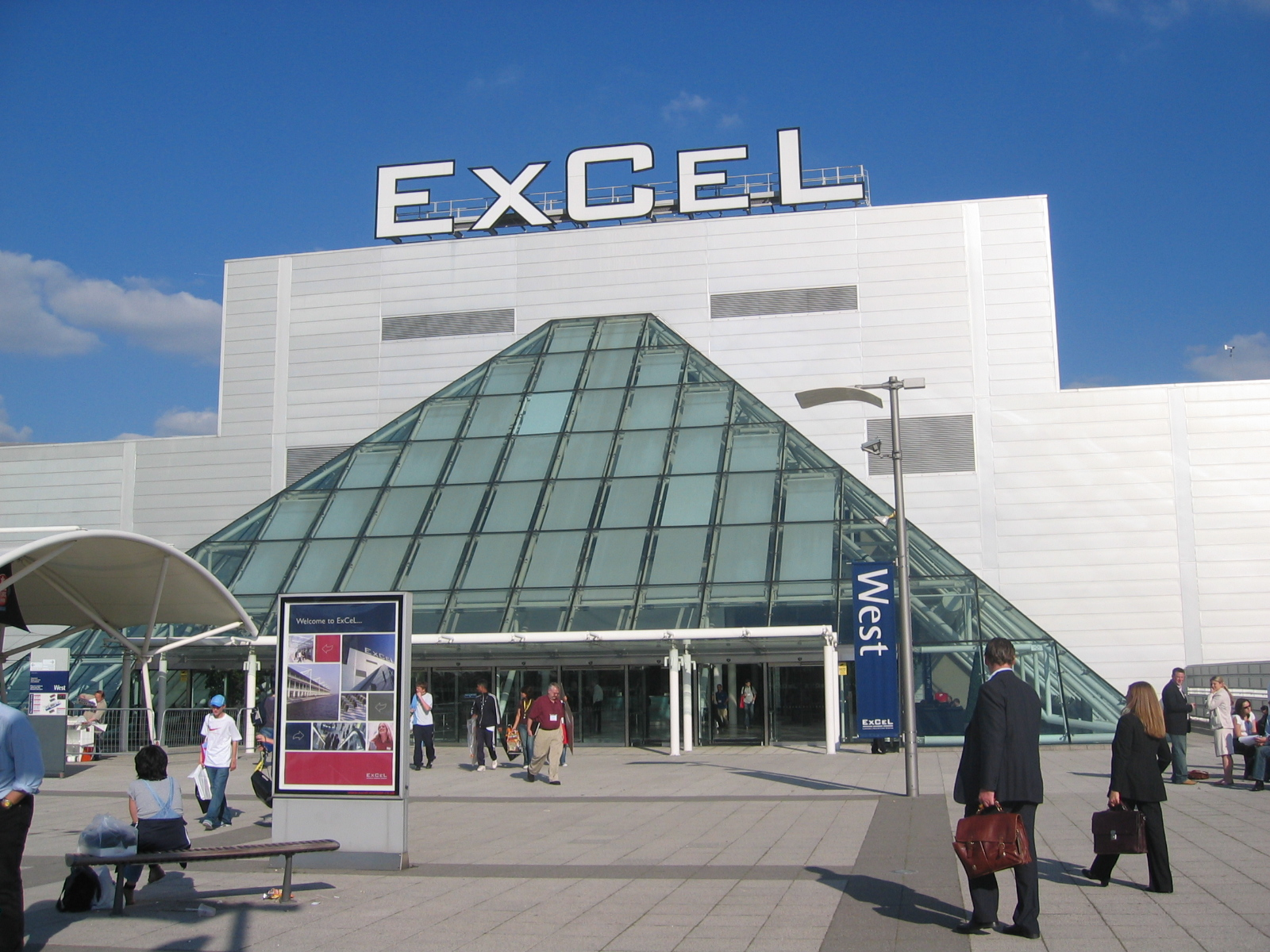
The ExCeL Centre

In May 2008, ADNEC invested AED 960 million (US$261.36 million) to acquire ExCeL London, the UK capital's largest exhibition centre, as part of its international expansion strategy. Situated at London's Royal Docks, the venue's event halls provide 65,000 m^{2} (700,000 sq ft) of total hall space and 45 meeting rooms that can fit 50 to 200 delegates. It is part of a 100-acre (0.40 km^{2}) campus that includes five on-site hotels. The centre's event area will be extended by 50 per cent and include a 5,000-seat, purpose-built convention center, ICC London ExCeL, by spring of 2010. Since 2000, ExCeL London has hosted more than 2,000 events and received over 5 million visitors from over 200 countries. In 2020, ExCel was the site of NHS Nightingale Hospital London, a temporary hospital used to treat COVID-19 patients. It was reported that ADNEC charged the health service £2–3 million per month for use of the site.

=== ADNEC Centre Al Ain ===
Enabling works to double the capacity of the existing venue to 12,000 m^{2} (130,000 sq ft) are ongoing and construction will commence in late 2009 or early 2010. It is part of the Al Ain Convention Centre district, which covers an area of 275,000 m^{2} (2.96 million ft^{2}), and is estimated to cost AED 3.5 billion. The project will feature three main public parks, a cultural centre, a four star hotel and conference centre, with a retail link to the existing venue. Work is also underway to link the overall development to the Al Ain road grid, via a boulevard.

=== Capital Centre ===
Capital Centre is a mixed-use business and residential micro-city being masterplanned by ADNEC and constructed around the Abu Dhabi National Exhibition Centre. Upon its completion, Capital Centre will comprise twenty-three towers, including six branded hotels, four commercial buildings, eight residential and serviced apartment complexes, and 5 mixed-use developments.

In October 2009, the 408-room Aloft Abu Dhabi opened, which is connected to the Abu Dhabi National Exhibition Centre and part of the Capital Centre development. It is the first Aloft in Europe, Africa and the Middle East. Aloft is owned by ADNEC and operated by Starwood Hotels and Resorts Worldwide. A total of 560 solar panels, covering a total area of 2,300 m^{2} (25,000 sq ft), have been installed on the roof of ADNEC Car Park A, to provide 90 per cent of the hot water at Aloft Abu Dhabi. These panels heat water for the hotel's 408 bedrooms, 2 production kitchens, food & beverage outlets, hotel offices and the swimming pool saving an estimated 870 mega watt hours of electricity every year by making use of the infra-red component of sun light to generate energy. Aloft is the first hotel in Abu Dhabi to make use of such solar energy panels.

=== Capital Gate ===
Capital Gate, part of the Capital Centre complex, is a 160-metre, 35-storey tower that's built next to the Abu Dhabi National Exhibition Centre which incorporates a slanting-core concept to feature an 18-degree westward lean. It includes 20,000 m^{2} (220,000 sq ft) of office space and house Abu Dhabi's first Hyatt hotel. The tower is linked directly to the exhibition venue as well as a 2.4 km Marina Zone currently under development.

In November 2009, the tower topped out its central core and reached its final height of 160 metres (520 ft). Capital Gate is the house of Abu Dhabi's second Hyatt hotel, Hyatt at Capital Centre, a presidential style luxury five-star hotel, which has 189 rooms.

In June 2010, the Guinness World Records certified Capital Gate as the "World's furthest leaning man-made tower." The new record shows that the Capital Gate tower has been built to lean 18 degrees westwards; more than four times that of the world-famous Leaning Tower of Pisa. Investigation and evaluation, which was made by a Guinness appointed awards committee, started in January 2010, when the exterior of the 160-metre (524.9 ft), 35-storey tower was completed.

The Capital Gate project was able to achieve its record inclination through a special engineering breakthrough that allows floor plates to be stacked vertically up to the 12th storey and staggered over each other by between 300 mm and 1,400 mm, which allows for the tower's dramatic lean.

The tower features other innovative construction techniques including the world's first known use of a 'pre-cambered' core. The technique utilizes 15,000 m^{2} (160,000 sq ft) of concrete reinforced with 10,000 tons of steel. The core, deliberately built slightly off centre, has straightened as the building has risen, compressing the concrete and giving it strength, and moving into (vertical) position as the weight of the floors has been added.

Capital Gate was designed by international architectural firm RMJM. Capital Gate houses the 5-star Hyatt Capital Gate hotel as well as approximately 20,000 m^{2} of premium office space. Project management and handover of all the restaurants, show kitchens and foodservice areas were overseen by a Dubai-based hospitality foodservice design firm.
