= Bloom Holding =

Emirati real estate development company

- Industry: real estate, education, services, hospitality
- Founded: 2008
- Headquarters: Abu Dhabi, United Arab Emirates
- Subsidiaries: Bloom Holding include Bloom Properties, Bloom Education, Bloom Hospitality, Bloom Facilities Management (bfm), Bloom Landscape
- Website: bloomholding.com

Bloom Holding is a development company headquartered in Abu Dhabi, United Arab Emirates. The company was established in 2008 as a subsidiary of National Holding and engaged in real estate, education, services, and hospitality. The entities that are being operated under the umbrella of Bloom Holding include Bloom Properties, Bloom Education, Bloom Hospitality, Bloom Facilities Management (bfm), and Bloom Landscape.

== Projects ==
In April 2015, during the Cityscape Abu Dhabi exhibition, Bloom Holding launched Park View in Saadiyat Island, a residential and hotel apartment building consisting of 234 units. In 2016, the company started the development of Soho Square, a 10 storeys building on Saadiyat Island and next to New York University's Saadiyat campus.

In 2022, Bloom Holding launched Bloom Living, a AED 9 billion gated, development that includes more than 4500 villas, townhouses, and apartments built over an area of 2.2 million square meters close to Zayed International Airport. As of 2024, six phases of Bloom Living have been launched, which include Cordoba, Toledo, Casares, Granada, Seville, and Olvera.

Bloom Holding's hospitality offerings include a combination of guest rooms and executive hotel apartments across Marriott Downtown, the Abu Dhabi EDITION and the upcoming Bloom Arjaan by Rotana.

Bloom Holding manages and operates 18 schools and one nursery with over 21,000 students, including Brighton College in Abu Dhabi, Al Ain, and Dubai ADEK Charter Schools, ESE "Ajyal" Schools, Bloom Nurseries at Bloom Gardens, Bloom Holding's own brand IB School Bloom World Academy, and two international schools to be located within Bloom Living.

=== Outside UAE ===
In May 2016, Bloom Holding announced the South Broadway project in downtown Rochester, Minnesota, a renovated building that provides office space available up to 20,000 square feet.

In 2022, Bloom Holding entered into a joint venture with New Era Education and New Giza Real Estate Development to launch Uppingham Cairo, a K12 co-educational international school located in New Giza, west of Cairo, Egypt.

In 2024, Bloom Holding and LEAD Development announced a joint venture agreement with Spanish developer, Mabel Real Estate, a division of Mabel Capital, to co-develop a luxury residential project in Spain, “Mabel Marbella Residences”. The project will span over 100,000 sqm of land in the coveted Golden Mile, a premier residential area in the Spanish city, Marbella.
