= INTERMAT Middle East =

- Location: Abu Dhabi National Exhibition Centre
- Inaugurated: 2011
- Most recent: 2012
- Next event: January 2014
- Participants: 250 exhibitors
- Attendance: 7,000 visitors
- Organiser: Comexposium & Clarion Events Middle East
- Website: www.intermat-middleeast.com

INTERMAT Middle East is an annual international trade show for the construction and materials industries. It is currently held at the Abu Dhabi National Exhibition Centre (ADNEC) where the last show was held in October 2012. The next show is scheduled for January 14–16, 2014.

INTERMAT Middle East is an event showing the equipment and techniques used in the international building and civil engineering sectors to contractors and public authorities, all companies involved in building road, highway, railway, bridges, tunnels, ports and airports, marine and oil & gas infrastructures in the Middle East region. This trade exhibition is organised by Clarion Events Middle East and Comexposium, the leading European trade show organiser.

Under the patronage of:

- Hamdan bin Zayed bin Sultan Al Nahyan, UAE Federal Minister of Public Works

== 2012 event ==
- 213 exhibitors
- 5,523 visitors from 23 countries
- 49 visiting countries
- 8 national pavillons

== Key information ==
- Creation : 2011
- Frequency: Every year
- Next exhibition: January 14–16, 2014
- Opening times: 10.00 to 18.00
- Venue: Abu Dhabi National Exhibition Centre – Abu Dhabi - UAE
- Exhibition area: 20,000 sqm area dedicated to construction equipment, components and accessories for the civil engineering, building and materials industries
- Exhibitors: 250 exhibitors
