= Capital Gate =

Skyscraper in Abu Dhabi

- Capital Gate in 2013
- Interactive map of the Capital Gate area

General information
- Type: commercial, hotel
- Architectural style: Deconstructivism
- Location: Abu Dhabi, United Arab Emirates
- Coordinates: 24.418637°N 54.434692°E
- Construction started: September 2007
- Topped-out: 2010
- Completed: 2011
- Owner: Abu Dhabi National Exhibitions Company

Height
- Roof: 160 m (520 ft)

Technical details
- Floor count: 35
- Floor area: 53,100 m^{2} (572,000 sq ft)

Design and construction
- Architect: RMJM
- Structural engineer: TJEG
- Main contractor: Al Habtoor Engineering Enterprises

References
- "Emporis building ID 322929". Emporis. Archived from the original on April 21, 2016. "Capital Gate". SkyscraperPage.

Capital Gate, also known as the Leaning Tower of Abu Dhabi, is a skyscraper in Abu Dhabi that is over 160 meters (520 ft) tall, 35 stories high, with over 16,000 square meters (170,000 sq ft) of usable office space. Capital Gate is one of the tallest buildings in the city and was designed to incline 18° west, more than three times the lean of the Leaning Tower of Pisa. The building is owned and was developed by the Abu Dhabi National Exhibitions Company. The tower is the focal point of Capital Centre.

== Construction ==
=== Project timeline ===
- September 2007: The start.
- November 2007: Started drilling foundations.
- April 2008: Construction of core wall.
- February 2009: Facade erected.
- May 2009: Building reached a height of 100 meters (330 ft).
- June 2009: Incline started to take shape.
- October 2009: Building reached final height of 160 meters (520 ft).
- December 2009: Exterior core structure completed.
- January 2010: First phase of splash completed.
- February 2010: Interior construction started.
- March 2010: Started building the bridge to Abu Dhabi National Exhibition Centre.
- April 2010: Started building the atrium roof.
- 2011: Construction completed.
- December 21, 2011: Opening.

=== Foundation ===
The structure rests on a foundation of 490 pilings that have been drilled 30 meters (98 ft) below ground. The deep pilings provide stability against strong winds, gravitational pull, and seismic pressures that arise due to the incline of the building. Of the 490 pilings, 287 are 1 meter (3 ft 3 in) in diameter and 20 to 30 meters (66 to 98 ft) deep, and 203 are 60 centimeters (24 in) in diameter and 20 meters (66 ft) deep. All 490 piles are capped together using a densely reinforced concrete mat footing nearly 2 meters (6.6 ft) deep. Some of the piles were only initially compressed during construction to support the lower floors of the building. Now they are in tension as additional stress caused by the overhang has been applied.

=== Core of the structure ===
The core of the Capital Gate was built using jumping formwork, also known as climbing formwork. The center concrete core had to be specially designed to account for the immense forces created by the building's angle of elevation, or camber. The core contains 15,000 cubic meters (20,000 cu yd) of concrete reinforced with 10,000 metric tons of steel and uses vertical post-tension and was constructed with a vertical pre-camber. This pre-camber means the core was constructed with a slight opposite lean. As each floor was installed, the weight of the floors and diagonal grid, or diagrid, system pulled the core and slowly straightened it out. The core contains 146 vertical steel tendons, each 20 meters (66 ft) long, which are used for post-tension.

=== Superstructure ===
Given the 18° lean of the building, the construction required two diagrid systems: an external diagrid defining the tower's shape and an internal diagrid linked to the central core by eight unique, pin-jointed structural members. The external diagrid comprises 720 sections of varying shapes, as it is based on the direction in which the tower leans. The external grid carries the weight of the floor while the internal diagrid connects with the external and transfers the load to the core, thereby eliminating the need for columns in the floor.

== World record ==
In June 2010, Guinness World Records recognized Capital Gate tower as the world's "farthest manmade leaning building". The new record shows that the Capital Gate tower has been built to lean 18° west, which is more than four times that of the Leaning Tower of Suurhusen. The recognition was given following a thorough evaluation by a Guinness-appointed awards committee, which began in January 2010, when the exterior was completed.

== Architecture and design ==
The building has a diagrid specially designed to absorb and channel the forces created by wind and seismic loading, as well as the gradient of Capital Gate. Capital Gate is one of only a handful of diagrid buildings in the world. Others include London's 30 St Mary Axe (Gherkin), New York's Hearst Tower, and Beijing's National Stadium.

Capital Gate was designed by architectural firm RMJM and was completed in 2011. The tower includes 16,000 square meters (170,000 sq ft) of office space and the Andaz Hotel on floors 18 through 33.

== See also ==
- List of tallest buildings in Abu Dhabi
- Inclined building
- List of twisted buildings
