= Itz Valley Autobahn Bridge (Coburg) =

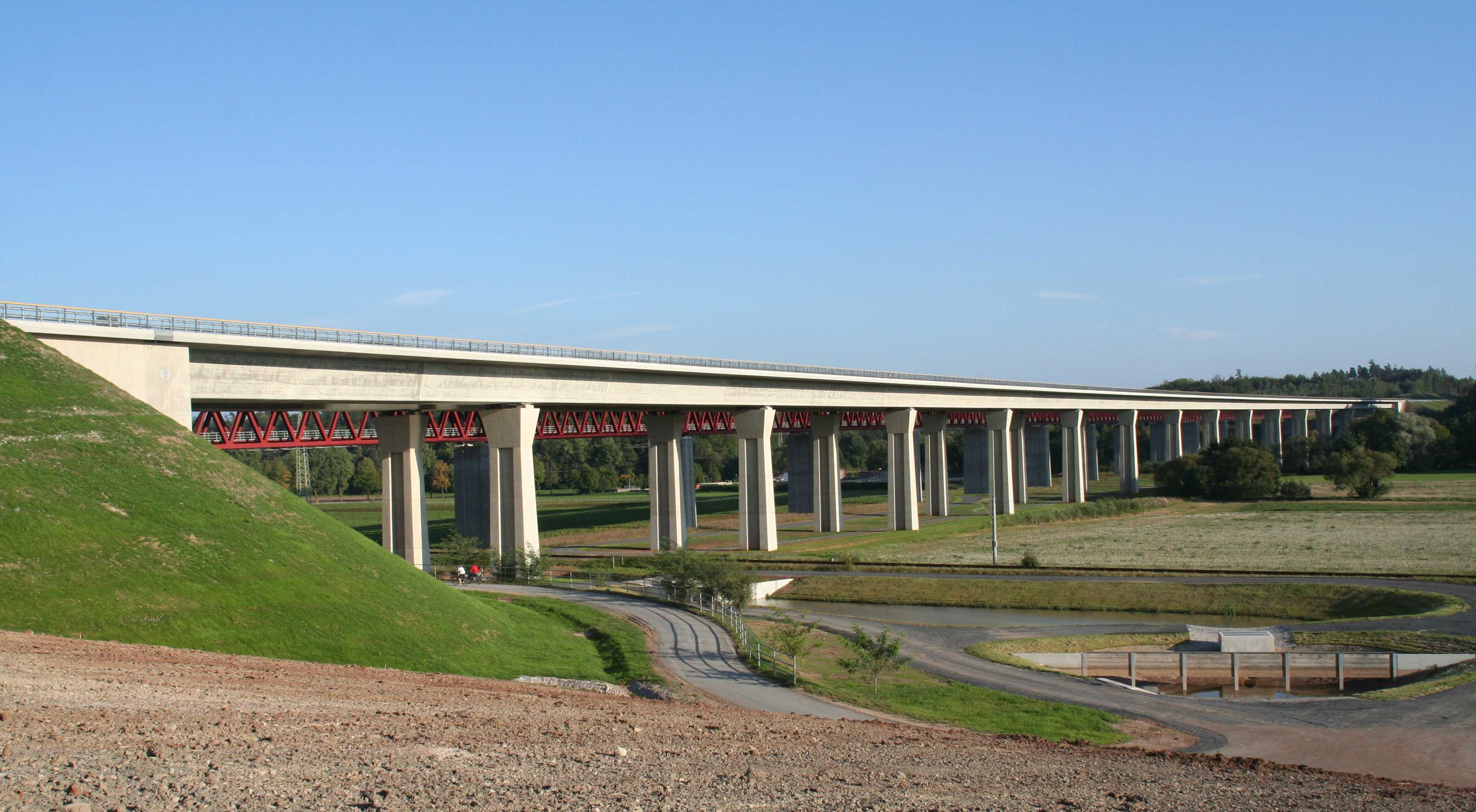
- Itz Valley Autobahn Bridge (2007)
- Coordinates: 50°16′50″N 11°0′50″E
- Carries: A73 Autobahn
- Crosses: Itz valley

Characteristics
- Material: Steel and concrete
- Total length: 852 metres (2,795 ft)

The Itz Valley Autobahn Bridge (German: Itztalbrücke) is a twin Autobahn bridge carrying the Autobahn A73 across the Itz Valley directly to the south of Autobahn Junction 9 (Rödental exit), and close to Coburg on the northern edge of Bavaria in Germany. The Autobahn bridge, which has an approximately north-south axis, has been built approximately 25 meters to the west of the Itz Valley Railway Bridge. However, whereas the Autobahn bridge has been in use since 2007, the railway bridge has been unused since its completion in 2005 because the high speed line of which the railway bridge is part, though started in 1996, has been deprioritised and is not expected to be completed for some time.

Constructed between 2004 and 2007 for a total cost of around €31.5 million, the Autobahn bridge is constructed of pre-stressed steel-concrete box girder sections. It is the longest bridge on the Autobahn A73, having a total length of 852 metres (2,795 ft) and a maximum height above the valley floor of 34 metres (112 ft).

== Groundwork and substructure ==
The abutments and pillars supporting the bridge are themselves supported by piles each of which has a diameter of 1.3 metres (4.3 ft) and a depth of between 15 metres (49 ft) and 31 metres (102 ft)

== Superstructure ==
The bridge comprises two carriageways each of which as its own concrete pillars and each of which is constructed as a continuous beam with a hollow box-section with a constant height of 4.2 metres (13.8 ft). The concrete beams incorporate 22 internal and 4 external steel reinforcement tendon-supports.

The overall length between abutments is 852 metres (2,795 ft). The total width of the two carriageways from one side to the other is 49 metres (161 ft), but that includes a gap between the two parallel bridges which is 13 metres (43 ft) wide.
