= 4D Cityscape =

Series of puzzles created by Shaun Sakdinan in 2010

4D Cityscape is a series of jigsaw puzzles, which include elements from a city's past, present and future. The puzzles contain many of the city's famous landmarks. The puzzles were created by Shaun Sakdinan in 2010.

The first 4D Cityscape puzzle released was for New York City. The puzzles were awarded the Gift of the Year 1st Place Prize in 2010.

== Puzzles ==
Puzzles available include:

- Paris landmarks including the Eiffel Tower, the Louvre and Notre Dame.
- London landmarks, including Tower Bridge, The Gherkin and the Shard London Bridge.
- New York City landmarks including the Empire State Building, the Statue of Liberty and One World Trade Center. New York was the first city to be released in the series.
- Chicago landmarks include the Willis Tower, Trump International Hotel and Tower and the Chicago Spire.
- Washington D.C. landmarks include the Pentagon, the United States Capitol and the Washington Monument.
- Las Vegas landmarks include Luxor, MGM Grand and Stratosphere.
- Macau's puzzle comes in a regular version and in a special Grand Prix gold in the dark version.
