= Cityscape Abu Dhabi =

Real estate event in the United Arab Emirates

Coordinates: 24.4857°N 54.3596°E

- Status: Active
- Genre: Real estate, Conferences, Seminars, Exhibition, Trade show
- Venue: Abu Dhabi National Exhibition Centre
- Location: Abu Dhabi
- Country: United Arab Emirates
- Inaugurated: 2007
- Most recent: 2013
- Attendance: 40000+ (2011)
- Organizer: Informa Exhibitions
- Website: www.cityscapeabudhabi.com

Cityscape Abu Dhabi is a real estate event, taking place in Abu Dhabi every year since 2007. It include real estate exhibition, seminars and conferences, and is attended by real estate developers, investors, government representatives, consultants and architects. It is organised by Informa Exhibitions. Sister events of Cityscape Abu Dhabi are Cityscape Global, Cityscape Egypt, Cityscape Riyadh, Cityscape Jeddah, Cityscape Qatar, Latin America and Cityscape Asia.

== History ==
Cityscape Abu Dhabi 2007 was the first major real estate event in Abu Dhabi. The exhibition received more than 15,670 industry professionals and covered 24,000 square meters of exhibition space. 187 developers participated in the exhibition by putting different projects on display.

The second edition in 2008 had 297 developers from different countries displaying their projects. The exhibition received more than 48,354 visitors including investors and real estate professionals from 107 countries.

Cityscape Abu Dhabi 2009 opened on April 19, 2009 and the recorded number of attendees reached 30,000, including regional and international investors, real estate developers, architects and property consultants, coming from 34 different countries. A total of 317 developers took part in the exhibition.

Cityscape Abu Dhabi 2010 was held at Abu Dhabi National Exhibition Centre (ADNEC). The exhibition featured a life-size model of Abu Dhabi's 2030 plan.

Over 70 companies took part in Cityscape 2013, exhibiting more than 500 projects. Abu Dhabi's 2030 vision was also discussed at the show.

12th Cityscape Abu Dhabi in 2018, launched by Hamed bin Zayed Al Nahyan, attracted over 100 exhibitors and included discussions on trends like artificial intelligence and blockchain in real estate at the accompanying conference.
