= ADNEC Centre Abu Dhabi =

Exhibition centre in Abu Dhabi, UAE

Coordinates: 24.419814°N 54.437269°E

- Interactive map of ADNEC Centre Abu Dhabi
- Former names: Abu Dhabi National Exhibition Centre
- Address: Al Khaleej Al Arabi St - Al Rawdah - Al Ma'arid - Abu Dhabi
- Location: Abu Dhabi, United Arab Emirates

Construction
- Built: 2007
- Opened: February 18, 2007; 19 years ago
- Architect: RMJM

Website
- www.adnec.ae

The ADNEC Centre Abu Dhabi is an exhibition centre in Abu Dhabi. It was opened by Sheikh Khalifa bin Zayed bin Sultan Al Nahyan, President of the United Arab Emirates on February 18, 2007. It was designed by the international architecture firm, RMJM. The venue is the largest exhibition centre in the Middle East with a total space of 153,678m^{2} indoor and outdoor space. ADNEC Centre Abu Dhabi has a large seating capacity in its several locations in the venue. This includes 13 interconnected exhibition halls, an atrium, concourse space, a 6000 capacity ICC, two conference halls as well 21 meeting rooms. Marina Hall, due to open in 2022, will be the largest hall of its kind in the region, a 10,000sqm space that enables organisers to create showcases both on and off the water. The hall will be connected to ADNEC via a footbridge and easily accessible from Khaleej Al Arabi Street.

The exhibition centre also provides halls that range within the sizes of 3,167 to 7,919 square meters and a total of 38 vehicle entry points.

The exhibition centre has stimulated development around it, most notable the Capital Centre and Capital Gate projects.

== International agents for exhibitions held at ADNEC Centre ==
- EXPO HUNTING is the official agent for Abu Dhabi International Hunting and Equestrian Exhibition in Turkey.
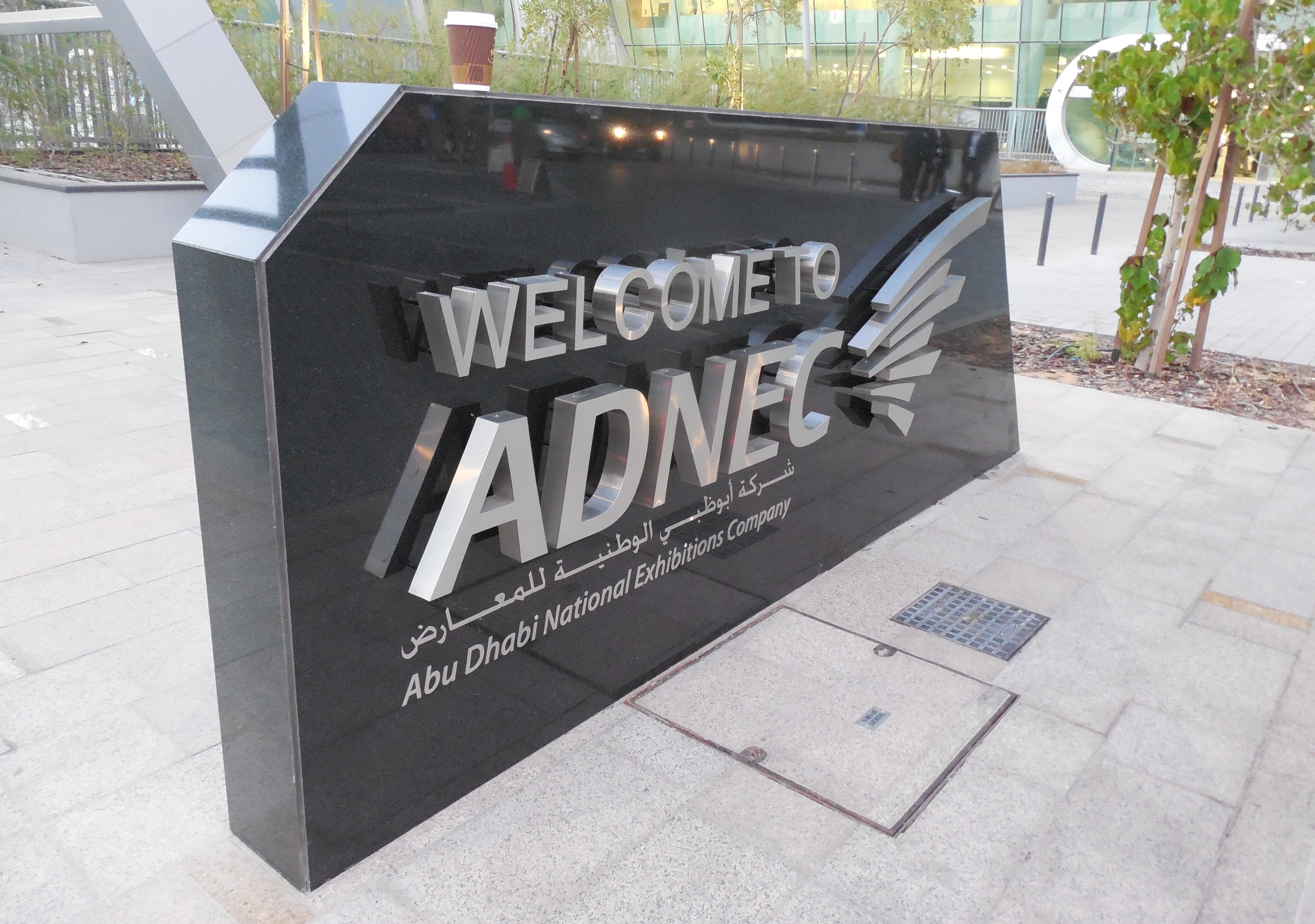
- Abu Dhabi National Exhibitions Company (ADNEC), Abu Dhabi
  EXPO HUNTING is the official agent for Abu Dhabi International Boat Show in Turkey.
