= Cultural policy in Abu Dhabi =

Cultural policy in Abu Dhabi, a city within the United Arab Emirates, refers to any initiative undertaken by the Emirate government aimed at achieving goals to contribute to or shape culture. Abu Dhabi's government aims to develop a cultural infrastructure that will allow it to establish itself as a reference point for culture on three levels:

- Locally, Abu Dhabi would preserve and sustain local traditions and heritage, promoting itself as the custodian of true Emirati and Arab identity.;
- Regionally, the focus on culture is meant to help the city and the Emirate compete against traditional centers of power in the Arab world (e.g. Egypt, Lebanon, pre-conflict Syria, etc.) for a leading role in Middle Eastern politics;
- Globally, Particular focus on the service sector and innovation.

Cultural Investment in Abu Dhabi. Source: SCAD
Name of Institution	Building Cost	Extended Investments
Guggenheim	400 mill USD	3 bill USD
Louvre	110 mill USD	562 mill USD
Zayed National Museum	/	/
Maritime Museum	/	/
NYU Abu Dhabi	/	/
Sorbonne Abu Dhabi	/	435.7 mill USD
Zayed University	/	1.116 bill USD
Ferrari Theme Park	/	2.97 bill USD

Since 2004, the Abu Dhabi government has invested resources to attain these goals. It has done so by developing local cultural districts, promoting education, and engaging in grand scale plans of urban transformation within the conceptual framework of "cultural infrastructure". Under the blueprint of the Abu Dhabi Vision 2030 plan, as these efforts have been branded, the main government body responsible for cultural development in the Emirate today is the Department of Culture and Tourism Abu Dhabi (DCTAD).

== History ==
The Emirate of Abu Dhabi has a diverse cultural history. Settlements of different tribal groups in the prehistoric era granted the region with a rich heritage of traditions and customs. However, the city did not engage in any serious urban development strategy until the discovery of oil in 1962. Thereafter, economic prosperity in the 60s and 70s has resulted in exposure to foreign influxes that jeopardized the integrity of local heritage. The Emirate's leadership has since then understood the importance of preserving its roots. Ruler's initiative is key in understanding cultural policymaking in Abu Dhabi. Official publications such as the Vision 2030 Master Plan stress the inspirational role played by UAE's first ruler, Zayed bin Sultan Al Nahyan, in investing oil and gas profits for the development and benefit of the Emirate and its people: "Sheikh Zayed recognized the assets of the UAE, not just its oil, but its true wealth - its people and heritage, its sustainable approach to life and the rich natural assets of the sea and the ‘sweet sands' of the desert". In the years, the Government of Abu Dhabi has established various institutions and agencies to develop this vision.

Founded in 1981, the Abu Dhabi Cultural Foundation (ADCF) has for long been the prominent institution in developing and implementing cultural programs in the Emirate. The Arts Workshop, for instance, was aimed at making activities such as ceramics, calligraphy and photography accessible to the general public. The declared mission of the ADCF has been to "promote culture, enrich intellectual thought, encouraging fine arts and highlighting the national, Arab and Islamic cultural heritage". When Sheikh Zayed died in 2004, his son Sheikh Khalifa took over and the Emirate's cultural ambitions were redefined in scope, with Abu Dhabi to become a truly global player: "Abu Dhabi will become an international cultural hub for the middle east on par with the best in the world", he declared. The Abu Dhabi Cultural Heritage Management Strategy was then developed in collaboration with UNESCO to investigate critical issues and design optimal policy responses over a five years' horizon. As a result of these studies, in 2005, operations of the ADCF were taken over by the Abu Dhabi Authority for Culture and Heritage (ADACH), which was established with the aim of harmonizing the planning and managing of numerous cultural efforts: education, media, literature and arts, archaeological sites, research, intangible heritage and oral traditions, natural landscape. It incorporated several cultural establishments such as the Abu Dhabi National Library, the Abu Dhabi National Archives, the Al Ain National Museum and the Abu Dhabi Islands Archaeological Survey. A sister company, the Abu Dhabi Tourism Authority (ADTA) was established in 2004 for the promotion and development of the tourism sector in the Emirate.

== Institutional Framework ==
In opposition to the laissez-faire approach adopted by the neighboring Dubai, which allows for greater flexibility in private initiative, Abu Dhabi still adopts a top-down planning policy and the institutional framework, direct emanation of the Government and of the ruling family, is a key component of the Emirate's cultural policy. Governmental institutions, advisory bodies and financing funds are invariably chaired by members of the ruling family and consultations with the local population are rare. Following bodies perform today a critical role in cultural policymaking in Abu Dhabi:

=== The Abu Dhabi Tourism and Culture Authority (TCA) ===
Established in February 2012 by Sheikh Khalifa bin Zayed Al Nahyan, the president of Abu Dhabi, this 'super-agency' combines the existing authorities for tourism, culture and heritage and retains all assets, mandates and staff of the previous organizations.

Mission: Its declared mission is "to promote the heritage, culture and traditions of Abu Dhabi emirate worldwide, […] to support the emirate's evolution into a world-class, sustainable destination which makes a unique contribution to the global cultural landscape while conserving its singular character and ecosystem".

Cultural Mandate: Its mandate is directly related to the Abu Dhabi Vision 2030 Master Plan, which dictates guidelines for policy-making and offers a coherent strategic framework within which cultural policy in Abu Dhabi must be interpreted.

Operations and Responsibilities: Activities of the TCA are conducted in accordance to its given remit and include:

- The management of Abu Dhabi's growing tourism sector and its promotion internationally, by marketing it to culturally aware visitors and by facilitating international investments.
- the preservation and protection of Abu Dhabi's cultural heritage, with particular attention to its historic and archaeological sites, among which UNESCO World Heritage sites.
- the management of both existing and new museums, including the overseeing of operations in developing the Saadiyat Island Cultural District
- reaching new local and international audiences by nurturing a lively cultural environment and by sustaining and promoting cultural events, artistic programs, and other intellectual activities
- sponsoring education programs and broaden appreciation of Abu Dhabi's traditions and legacy, as well as preserving collective memory and intangible heritage of the Emirate
- fostering a future class of leaders and professionals in the field of culture and education
- promoting the development of human and cultural capital in light with the challenges posed by the knowledge economy.

=== The Tourist Development and Investment Company (TDIC) ===
Established in 2006, the TDIC is an independent publicly listed company of which the TCA is the only shareholder. It is directly involved in developing the Saadiyat Island project by managing estates and propriety rights on the island, allocating it to private investors and ensuring the sites are developed according to the Master Plan regulations and guidelines.

=== The Abu Dhabi Council for Economic Development (ADCED) and the Urban Planning Council (UPC) ===
Respectively established in 2007 and 2006, the UPC and the ADCED are government agencies responsible for the planning of urban development strategies and for economic policy advisory in Abu Dhabi. The agencies cooperate in light of the complementary role they play in the developments of the emirate. Their partnership ensures successful completion of the government's long-term vision, by integrating knowledge to inform policymakers in the outlining of individual policies, plans and blueprints that account for the multidisciplinary facets underlying the pursue of a truly sustainable future for Abu Dhabi. Their workings resulted in the definition and publication of the Abu Dhabi Vision 2030 Master Plan, which is the foremost inspiring document behind cultural policymaking in the emirate.

== The Abu Dhabi Vision 2030 Master Plan ==
Cultural policy in Abu Dhabi is largely subsumed to the so-called Abu Dhabi Vision 2030 Master Plan. The plan, a comprehensive set of strategic policies for the development of the Emirate in the next 20 years, has been sponsored since 2006 by Their Highnesses Sheikh Khalifa bin Zayed Al Nahyan, the late UAE President and Ruler of Abu Dhabi, and Sheikh Mohammed bin Zayed Al Nahyan, the current UAE President and Ruler of Abu Dhabi. The Plan aims at coordinating the political efforts of all agencies and authorities of the Emirate's government. It relies on two main pillars: the Abu Dhabi Economic Vision 2030 and the Abu Dhabi Urban Planning Vision 2030. Culture constitutes an important premise for both plans.

=== Economic Vision 2030 ===
The Abu Dhabi Economic Vision 2030 has been outlined by the Abu Dhabi Council for Economic Development (ADCED) and its foremost declared aim is to promote "Abu Dhabi as a sustainable, diversified, high-value-added economy that encourages enterprises and entrepreneurships and is well integrated in the global economy leading to better opportunities for all".

=== Urban Planning Vision 2030 ===
The Abu Dhabi Urban Planning Vision 2030 addresses new challenges brought about by demographic shifts in the Emirate aiming at "Developing physical plans and policies to shape Abu Dhabi Emirate as the leading global 21st century Arab capital and ensuring factors such as sustainability, infrastructure capacity, economic growth and community planning are integrated to provide a high- quality of life for all." The main authority responsible for its implementation is the Abu Dhabi Urban Planning Council (UPC).

=== Estidama ===
In particular, the conceptual guidelines underlying the Vision 2030 Master Plan are outlined in Estidama. Originally designed in 2008 by the UPC as a policy program, Estidama, which means "sustainability" in Arabic, has since then rather become an inspirational vision for political governance. Aiming at achieving a more balanced society and enhancing well-being of future generations, it is grounded on four main pillars: economic, environmental, social, and cultural sustainability.

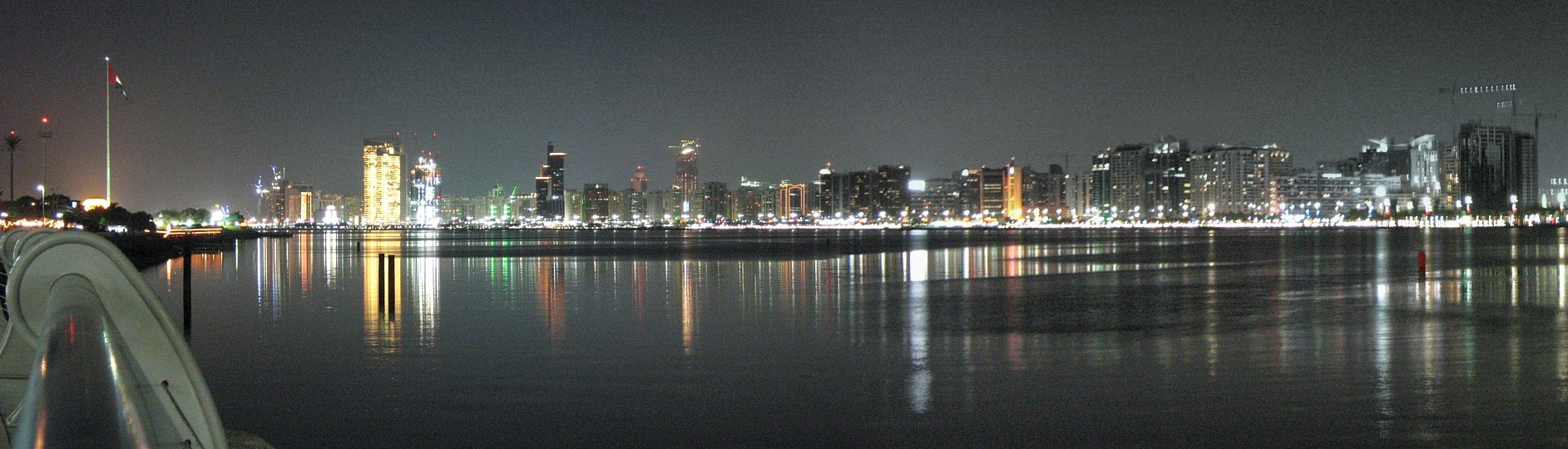
A panoramic view of modern Abu Dhabi, as seen from the Marina

== Long Term Objectives for Cultural Policy ==
=== Economic Sustainability: Diversification through Tourism ===
The cultural policy in Abu Dhabi is functional to various goals. In the wording of the Economic Vision 2030 Policy Plan: "to diversify the Emirate's economy away from oil while developing ambitious plans to become a genuinely sustainable world-class capital city ". Accounting for about 87% of the UAE's territory and for an estimated 90% of its total oil exports (10% of world's known oilfield deposits), Abu Dhabi not only is the largest, but also the wealthiest of the UAE. Indeed, its natural resources have granted it with consistent returns over the years. Today, Abu Dhabi's sovereign wealth fund, the Abu Dhabi Investment Authority (ADIA), boasts the highest capitalization in the world and is estimated at about 300 to 875 billion dollars. However, the Emirate is faced with issues of sustainability of its national economy. Oil is a perishable resource: the neighboring Dubai has depleted its reserves and was forced into high risk, fast-tracked strategies of diversification as oil-related industries have gradually winded down. Furthermore, oil dependent economies are heavily exposed to fluctuations in global oil prices. Hedging against the risk of unexpected downward pressure has been another important driving force behind diversification to non-oil industrial and service sectors. Under this respect, cultural policy aims at sustaining Abu Dhabi's growing tourism industry both by capitalizing on existing cultural and natural heritage as well as by developing new offers and attractions for global touring.

=== Social Sustainability: the Ruling Bargain ===
As the economy diversifies and exposes to a global environment, equilibria are upset and jeopardize social security and political stability. Many have argued that political power in UAE's constitutional monarchies relies upon a 'ruling bargain' with the local population, that is, a delicate balance of elements of legitimacy strictly dependent on local culture and religion, as well as on how the wealth is redistributed within the country.

=== Cultural Sustainability: Abu Dhabi as an Authentic Arab Capital ===
Developing local culture is functional for the Emirate to express the capital role of the UAE, seat of the national Government: Abu Dhabi as an authentic Arab Capital, addressed in the Abu Dhabi Capital 2030 Plan. Rulers in Abu Dhabi pursue a demanding role for the Emirate in the regional and world politics. The aim is to promote Abu Dhabi as a global capital, world cultural hub and reference point for middle east-politics.

== Events, Ongoing Projects and Developments ==
The following list enumerates the main artistic and cultural events, institutions or projects that take place or are currently being developed in the framework of cultural life in Abu Dhabi.

=== Saadiyat Island ===
Saadiyat Island, which literally translates into "island of happiness", probably represents the most significant and ambitious initiative within the Emirate's cultural policy. Developed by the Tourism Development and Investment Company, the Saadiyat project aims at creating a cultural district for the Emirate. It will be host to following museums and institutions:

- Guggenheim Abu Dhabi
- Louvre Abu Dhabi
- Performing Arts Center
- Zayed National Museum
- Maritime Museum

Within the framework of Abu Dhabi's cultural policy, the project will sustain two main goals. Politically, it will be functional to "cultural enlightment" in the Emirate; economically, in a rather profit-making perspective, it will allow for diversification into cultural tourism.

=== Main Museums and Cultural Landmarks ===
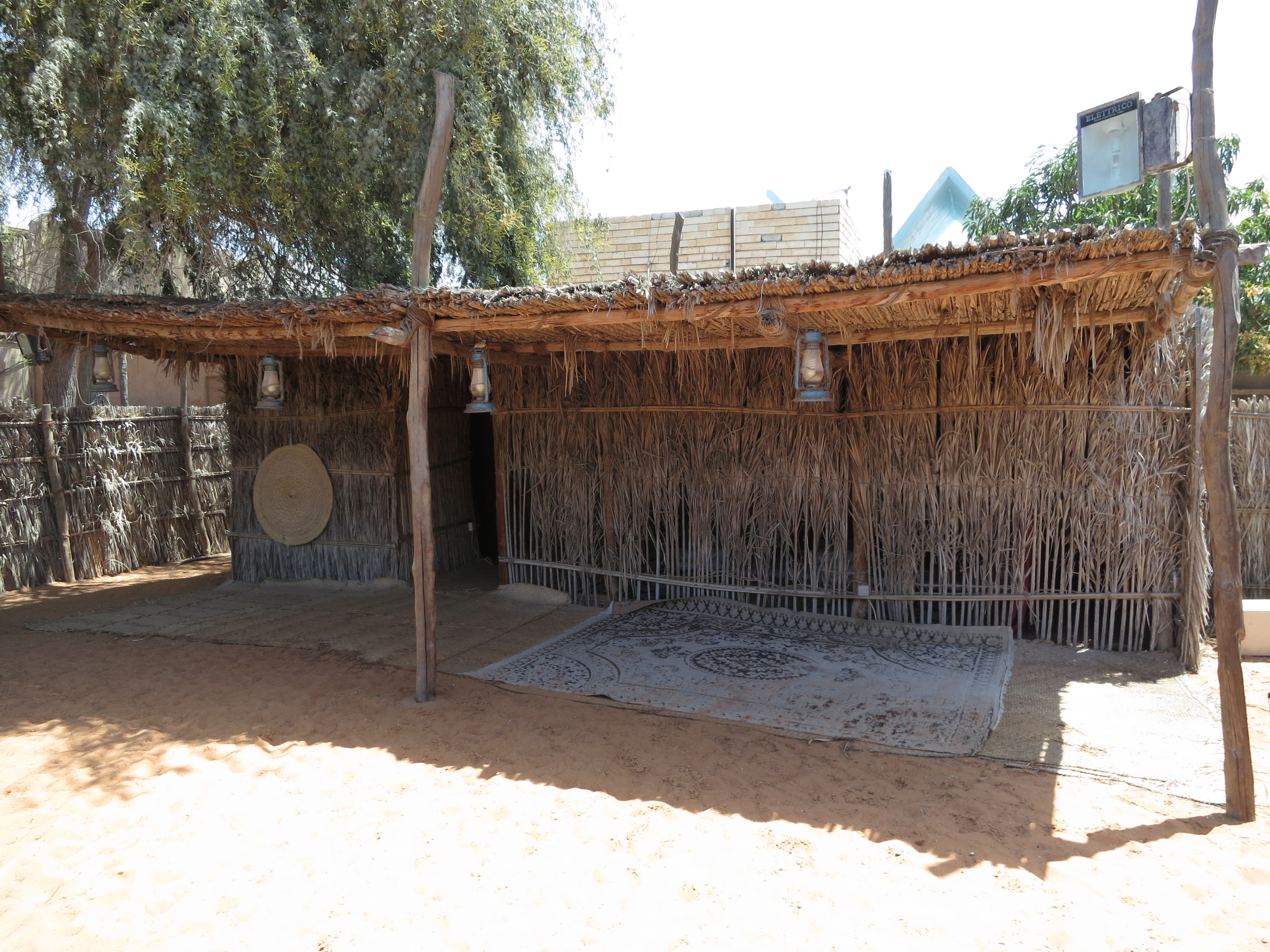
Typical Arabic house displayed at the Heritage Village in Abu Dhabi

- Heritage Heartland
- Al Ain National Museum
- Al Ain Palace Museum
- Al Jahili Fort
- Heritage Village
- Sheik Zayed Grand Mosque Library
- Zayed Centre
- Al Maqtaa Fort
- Saluki Centre
- Al Qattara Arts Centre
- Hili Archeological Garden
- Heritage Theme Park
- Miraj Islamic Centre
- Manarat
- UAE Pavilion
- Archeological Site on Sir Bani Yas

=== Private Art Galleries ===
- The Salwa Zeidan Gallery
- The Ghaf Gallery
- The Barakat Gallery
- The Abu Dhabi Art Hub
- The Genuine Gallery

=== Main Festivals and Fairs ===
- Abu Dhabi Festival
- Abu Dhabi Art Fair
- Abu Dhabi International Book Fair
- Abu Dhabi Film Festival
- Tropfest Arabia Short-film Festival
- Abu Dhabi Classics
- Mother of the Nation Festival

=== Education ===
As part of its cultural policy planning, the government of Abu Dhabi has recently signed agreements with top universities and business schools around the world with the aim of attracting and fostering students, researchers and future professionals in the field of culture. The Emirate is host, among others, to following higher education institutions: New York University Abu Dhabi, Paris-Sorbonne University Abu Dhabi, INSEAD, New York Film Academy.

== Controversies and Future Challenges ==
Several commentators have been skeptical about the ambitions of Abu Dhabi's cultural policy. Following criticisms have been raised:

- Cultural Commodification and Colonialism. Some critics have argued that cultural policy in Abu Dhabi represents the epitome of a paradigmatic shift in our understanding of culture today, that is, its redefinition as a commodity within a business-based, transnational setting. In other words, the critique recites, the Emirate is not investing enough in the development of a genuinely local culture but is simply purchasing, or better, leasing, a "ready-made" cultural package from western institutions such as the Louvre or the Guggenheim. In doing so, furthermore, it voluntarily replicates the dynamic of colonialism and succumbs to western influences. Art historian Poulin, however, is sceptic about this latter view. He argues that these developments are not being imposed on the Rulers and that, rather, it could be a strategy aimed at attracting best practices with the hope for knowledge spillovers. Nonetheless, he continues, the dynamic indeed introduces a new form of domination: that of money over culture. Financial resources are invested in culture functionally to acquire dominance in the regional context. On the other hand, former director of the Guggenheim Museum Thomas Krens disagrees. In his view, projects like Saadiyat island are not about "exporting a commodity" or "setting up a franchise" but rather engage with the aim of establishing communication, interaction and cooperation, so to foster innovation and local talents.
- Abu Dhabi still adopts a conservative approach towards culture and does not promote a truly open discussion nor innovative research in the field of arts. Censorship and religious-driven conservatism still represent major challenges to artistic freedom and creativity in an Islamic country.
- The Emirate will not be able to successfully develop or attract future audience for its cultural offerings, as it lacks an autonomous art scene, which cannot easily be imposed top-down. The question is raised by some, whether "a truly local culture can take hold in a society dominated by rampant materialism".
- Within the development of the Saadyiat Island project, Human Rights Watch has filed a report in 2009 declaring that the UAE Government has abused of migrant workers and did not ensure protection of fundamental rights.

== See also ==
- Culture of the United Arab Emirates
- List of cultural property of national significance in the United Arab Emirates
- List of museums in the United Arab Emirates
- List of tourist attractions in the United Arab Emirates
