= National Book Trust =

Indian Publishing House

National Book Trust, India
- Logo of the National Book Trust, India
- Abbreviation: NBT
- Formation: 1 August 1957; 69 years ago
- Type: Governmental organisation
- Headquarters: Vasant Kunj, Delhi, India
- Region served: India
- Official language: English, Hindi
- Chairman: Prof. Milind Sudhakar Marathe
- Publication: NBT Newsletter
- Parent organisation: Ministry of Education; Government of India
- Website: nbtindia.gov.in

National Book Trust (NBT) is an Indian state-owned publishing house, headquartered in Delhi, India, founded in 1957 as an autonomous body under the Ministry of Education of the Government of India. NBT publishes reading material in several Indian languages for all age-groups, including books for children and Neo-literates. They publish NBT Newsletter, a monthly newsletter about recent publications.

The activities of the Trust include publishing, promotion of books and reading, promotion of Indian books abroad, assistance to authors and publishers, and promotion of children's literature.

== Objective ==
The National Book Trust (NBT), India is an apex body established by the Government of India (Department of Higher Education, Ministry of Human Resource Development) in the year 1957. India's first Prime Minister Pt. Jawaharlal Nehru envisioned that NBT would be a bureaucracy-free structure that would publish low-cost books. The objectives of the NBT are to produce and encourage the production of good literature in English, Hindi and other Indian languages and to make such literature available at moderate prices to the public and to bring out book catalogues, arrange book fairs/exhibitions and seminars and take all necessary steps to make the people book minded.

== Major initiatives ==
To widen readership base across the country, various programmes have been recently initiated by National Book Trust, India. Some of the new outreach programmes are detailed below:

=== Samagra Shiksha Abhiyaan ===
Under this initiative, age-group wise books of the Trust have been provided to school children in more than 50 Indian languages including tribal languages. The highlights of the programme are: around 1.5 lakh schools covered; 2 crore books of different genres printed; 16 States and Union Territories covered; 25,000 Readers’ Clubs established; 200+ Braille books in 5 languages; and 300+ illustrated books, chapter books, tactile, silent, e-books etc.

=== Guest of Honor presentations ===
India was the Guest of Honor Country at Abu Dhabi International Book Fair (24-30 April 2019) and at the Guadalajara Book Fair (30 Nov-8 Dec 2019). National Book Trust, India was designated by the Ministry of HRD, Government of India as the nodal agency to coordinate the Guest Country Presentations at the international book fairs. A 100+ strong delegation composed of authors, science communicators, children writers, storytellers, artists, publishing professionals participated in each of the two Guest Country Presentations.

=== Promotion of books and reading ===
NBT plays an important role in promoting books and the habit of reading by organizing book fairs and exhibitions throughout the country. As the nodal body for the promotion of books both in India and abroad, NBT:

- Organizes book fairs/exhibitions throughout the country at various levels. It also organizes the prestigious annual New Delhi World Book Fairs at New Delhi.
- Participates in major international book fairs annually and showcases books from India.
- Makes books available at the doorsteps of the people through mobile exhibitions and on-line sales through its website.
- Has enrolled more than 72,000 Book Club Members throughout the country.
- Provides financial assistance to authors and publishers.
- Organizes seminars and workshops.
- Organizes special book fairs and literary programmes in the north-east to promote books and book reading in the region.
- The Trust also publishes monthly newsletter, "NBT Newsletter", in English and also brings out yearly calendar.

=== Mobile book exhibitions ===
The NBT also operates on innovative scheme of exhibition of books through mobile vans, ‘Pustak Parikramas’ across the country to make books accessible to the public at large in remote, rural and difficult areas. Since its launch in 1992, about 15,000 such exhibitions have been organized across all the states in the country including north-eastern states.

=== New Delhi World Book Fair ===
The NBT organizes the prestigious annual New Delhi World Book Fair, which is the largest book event in the Afro-Asian region. Over the last four decades the New Delhi World Book Fair has earned itself a high reputation among international publishers. The 28th NDWBF was held from 4 to 12 January 2020 at Pragati Maidan, New Delhi. To mark the 150th Birth Anniversary of Mahatma Gandhi, the theme of NDWBF is ‘Gandhi: The Writers’ Writer’. In 2018, European Union and in 2019 Sharjah was the Guest of Honor Country at NDWBF.

=== National readership survey ===
The NBT conducted a National Action Plan for Readership Development Among the Youth (NAPRDY) with a vision to make all youth in the age-group of 15-25 an active reader by the year 2025. The first major step under the NAPRDY has been the undertaking of the first ever National Youth Readership Survey among rural and urban youth across the country, which was undertaken by the National Council of Applied Economic Research (NCAER), to assess the readership patterns as well as the reading needs of the youth. The Survey has since been published as a Report by the NBT.

The follow-up study in the form of a second Report on the Youth of North-East India: Demographics and Readership, giving an analytical and detailed account of the reading habits of the literate youth in the north-eastern states and their exposure to different forms of media, was also published by the NBT.

=== Promotion of Indian books abroad ===
As the nodal agency for the promotion of books overseas, the NBT participates in various international book fairs and puts up exhibitions to display select titles brought out by various Indian publishers. Since 1970, NBT has participated in various international book fairs including Frankfurt, Bologna, Jerusalem, Seoul, Sharjah, Beijing, Colombo, Tokyo, Bangkok, Minsk, Kuala Lumpur, Singapore, Warsaw, Nigeria, Kathmandu, Manila, London, Karachi, Dhaka, Lahore, Abu Dhabi and Jakarta. India’s Guest of Honor Presentations at Frankfurt (2006), Moscow (2009), Beijing (2010), Seoul (2013), Singapore (2014), Abu Dhabi (2019) and Guadalajara, Mexico (2019) were organized by NBT. As part of the presentations, the NBT coordinated many literary programmes, including seminars, discussions, reading sessions, and authors’ presentations. In addition, a special exhibit of books from India was also put up.

=== Promotion of children's literature ===
NBT's children's books are known for their illustrations, by illustrators such as Pulak Biswas, Jagdish Joshi, Mrinal Mitra, Subir Roy, Atanu Roy, Manjula Padmanabhan, Mickey Patel and Suddhasattwa Basu. Painters Jatin Das and Krishen Khanna have also illustrated books for the Trust.

In 1993 NBT established the National Center for Children’s Literature (NCCL) to monitor, coordinate, plan and aid the publication of children’s literature in various Indian languages. The NCCL is engaged in organizing workshops, exhibitions and promoting the habit of reading at the school level by encouraging the setting up of Readers’ Clubs. Till date over 33,000 (approx.) Readers’ Clubs have been established across various schools in the country. The Center is mandated to conduct surveys and research work related to children’s literature. It also publishes a quarterly bilingual magazine ‘Reader’s Club Bulletin’ for children. The NCCL’s library-cum-documentation center for children’s literature at New Delhi is now connected with the library network across the country and members can access the books online. This library is open for general public and researchers.

=== Assistance to authors and publishers ===
To promote the publication of reasonably priced books for higher education, NBT gives financial assistance to authors and publishers of textbooks and reference material. Under this scheme for the subsidized publication of books, only such books are subsidized for which a definite need is felt and which relate to subject areas where books of an acceptable standard are either not available or are so expensive as to be beyond the means of the students. So far, NBT has subsidized the publication of more than a thousand titles, mostly in English. The scope of the scheme has been widened to provide assistance for such publications in Indian languages.

=== National Book Week ===
Launched in the year 1982 the National Book Week is an initiative of the NBT to promote books and the habit of reading in the country. During the National Book Week, held from 14 to 20 November every year, the NBT organizes a number of book promotional activities and literary programmes throughout the country, like book exhibitions, seminars, discussions, meet-the-author programmes, workshops and other literary events.

=== Grant-in-aid scheme ===
NBT has been mandated by the Government of India to administer a Financial Assistance scheme for voluntary and literary bodies.

The Financial Assistance is given on ad-hoc basis for organizing book promotional activities. Up to 75 per cent of approved expenditure for any or more purposes namely:

1. To organize seminars of Indian Authors/ Publishers/ Booksellers on subjects which have direct bearing on Book Promotion in India.
2. To organize Training Course on a subject directly related to Book Promotion.
3. To organize Annual Conventions / Conferences of Writers/ Publishers/Booksellers.
4. Any other activity which may be found to be conducive to the development of Book Industry etc is provided.

=== NBT Book Club ===
The Trust also has a scheme of NBT Book Club. The members of this Club can avail a special discount on purchase of NBT books and also a discount on postal charges on the receipt of books through VPP. The life membership fee for the Club is only Rs. 100/- for individuals and Rs. 500/- for institutions. Now book lovers and institutions can enroll themselves online through NBT ReadersBook Club.

=== Training course in book publishing ===
To create a pool of trained professionals for the publishing industry, NBT conducts a month-long Training Course in Book Publishing in Delhi. Besides, NBT organizes short-term training courses in publishing in other parts of the country. In addition, NBT has now collaborated with select universities to offer one year post-graduate diploma in publishing studies. With this course NBT has been able to create more skilled human resource for publishing industry. Besides special publishing courses are also held in languages across India.

=== E-books ===
The NBT is into e-publishing, with more than 100 of its titles available in the e-format (EPUB 3.0), mainly intended to cater to the demands of Indian Diaspora and tech-savvy youth. The e-books are available in English, Hindi as well as in other Indian languages and can be accessed through Android enabled devices such as mobiles, tables, etc.

=== Promotion of books at Delhi Metro Station ===
The NBT, India and the Delhi Metro Rail Corporation (DMRC) entered into an MoU to open select NBT bookshops at major metro stations. These bookshops will attract thousands of students and other commuters who travel by the Metro daily. Two such bookshops have been opened at the Kashmere Gate and Vishwavidyalaya Metro Stations. DMRC will also identify and allot space at prominent Metro Stations to publicize the various book promotional activities of NBT. The effort is part of NBT’s initiative to collaborate with similar organizations to promote books and reading in the country.

=== Promotion of Indian books in foreign languages ===
To promote Indian writings abroad, NBT has initiated a ‘Financial Assistance Programme’ where NBT provides suitable incentive to foreign publishers in the form of financial assistance for translation of original Indian writings published by Indian publishers in English, Hindi and other Indian languages into foreign languages. The programme covers broad categories of fiction, non-fiction, science & technology, and books for children, except dictionaries, magazines, journals, textbooks for schools/ colleges and professional courses like medicine, pure & applied sciences, engineering, business administration, etc.

=== Pustak Sanskriti ===
National Book Trust, India is bringing out a quarterly magazine in Hindi titled Pustak Sanskriti. The magazine aims to not only update readers about the current literary and publishing events being organized across the country but to connect readers of all age groups especially youth with the rich tradition of Indian writings. Besides the activities of the Trust, the magazine also carries unpublished, original writings (short story, essays, poems, travelogues, etc.) of emerging new writers, book reviews, etc.

=== Scheme for promotion of young women writers ===
National Book Trust, India has introduced a new scheme to encourage young women writers ‘Mahila Lekhan Protsahan Yojana’. As per the scheme, the Trust has invited proposals from young women writers below 40 years from across the country writing in any of the 22 Indian languages recognized by the Constitution and in English. The manuscript submitted should be the writer’s first, original and unpublished. The genres may include novel, travelogue, memoirs, diary, short stories, plays and satire. The manuscripts selected by the jury will be published by NBT.

=== Shodh Yatri Programme ===
The Shodh Yatri Programme is a unique programme initiated to encourage students to do research on India’s contributions and influences as well as areas of contacts between India and other countries in the neighborhood. In the process, the research findings will also trace the Indian roots in the evolution of their culture and heritage. In pursuing this programme the Ministry of Human Resource Development in association with Indian Council of Historical Research, Central Board of Secondary Education and National Book Trust, India organized an all India Online Contest to select students who could be part of the Programme. The contest was open to students of classes X and XI, across all Boards of School Education and schools in the country. The contest included writing an essay on the theme at the MyGov.in website. Forty students (20 boys and 20 girls) were shortlisted for the interview which was conducted through Skype, in which ten students were selected as winners. A felicitation ceremony for the winners of the online Shodh Yatri contest was held at the New Delhi World Book Fair 2017. The winners were felicitated with a certificate, wooden replica of Ashoka Stambh, and Rs. 10,000/-.

=== India-China translation programme ===
In a significant initiative in cultural diplomacy, the Government of India and the Government of People’s Republic of China have put forward an ambitious translation programme that includes translation of select 25 classical and contemporary literary works from Chinese into Hindi and Indian literary works into Chinese. To give effect to this initiative a Memorandum of Understanding was signed between the Ministry of External Affairs, Government of India and the State Administration of Press, Publication, Radio, Film and Television of the People’s Republic of China on Cooperation in Mutual Translation and Publication of classic and contemporary works. It was signed during the visit of Premier Li Keqiang to India.

The project of taking forward the programme was given to National Book Trust, India. To implement this project the External Publicity and Public Diplomacy Division of Ministry of External Affairs, Government of India and the National Book Trust, India signed an MoU, to translate the 25 Chinese works into Hindi. In the first phase of translation books titled Analects of Confucius, Camel Xiangzi, Looks Beautiful and Selected Works of Bing Xin have been published.

=== 550th birth anniversary of Guru Nanak Dev ===
The year 2019 marked 550th birth anniversary of Guru Nanak Dev, the first Sikh Guru and founder of Sikhism. As part of the year-long celebrations, NBT India published four books on the teachings and philosophy of Guru Nanak Dev, viz. Guru Nanak Vani by Bhai Jodh Singh; Nanak Vani by Manjeet Singh; Baramah by renowned artist Siddharth, a coffee table book based on the poetic composition of Guru Nanak Dev; and Sakhian by Jagtaarjeet and illustrated by Gurdeep Singh. These books will be published in different Indian languages including Hindi, Punjabi, Marathi, Sindhi, Kashmiri, Sanskrit and English.
