= Abu Dhabi Art =

Art fair

Abu Dhabi Art is an art fair that takes place every November in Abu Dhabi, United Arab Emirates, featuring art galleries, art and design foundations, as well as additional educational programming and talks.

== History ==
Organized by Abu Dhabi Department of Culture and Tourism ( then known as Abu Dhabi Authority for Culture and Heritage (ADACH) ), the first edition took place in 2007 at the Emirates Palace in Abu Dhabi, under the name ArtParis Abu Dhabi. The fair is considered the first for modern and contemporary in the United Arab Emirates, under the patronage of Mohammed Bin Zayed Al Nahyan, Crown Prince of Abu Dhabi and Deputy Supreme Commander of the UAE Armed Forces.

2008: The second edition of the fair took place at Emirates Palace between 17–21 November and included 57 galleries exhibiting several hundred artists.

2009: Rebranded as Abu Dhabi Art (ADA), held between 19–22 November. The fair was organized for the first time by Tourism Development and Investment Company (TDIC) and Abu Dhabi Authority for Culture and Heritage (ADACH) under the patronage of General Mohammad Bin Zayed Al Nahyan.

2010: Opened by Salama Bint Hamdan Al Nahyan and held between 6–10 November.

2011: The third edition of the rebranded fair changed its location between Manarat Al Saadiyat and the newly shifted UAE pavilion, that housed the UAE’s participation at the 2010 Shanghai World Expo, at the Saadiyat Island Cultural district.

2012: The first edition to be organized by the newly formed Abu Dhabi Tourism and Culture Authority replacing the Abu Dhabi Authority for Culture and Heritage (ADACH) and the Abu Dhabi Tourism Authority (ADTA), held between 7–10 November 2012.

2013: Held between 20–23 November with 50 participating galleries divided into five sections including Beyond, for large-scale installations and sculptures; Bidaya, for emerging galleries; Signature, which featured solo exhibitions; Artists' Waves, an artist-led exhibition of work from within the galleries showing at the fair and the final category, Modern, Contemporary and Design.

2014: Organized by Abu Dhabi Tourism & Culture Authority and held between 5-8 Nov, included over 50 galleries showcasing over 600 works.

2025: Frieze has announced that it will debut a new art fair in Abu Dhabi in November 2026, replacing the Emirate’s existing Abu Dhabi Art fair, through a partnership with the Abu Dhabi Department of Culture and Tourism (DCT. This marks Frieze’s first expansion into the Middle East.

== See also ==
- Abu Dhabi Tourism and Cultural Authority
- Art Dubai
