= Ahom rebellion =

1828 anti-British rebellion in Assam

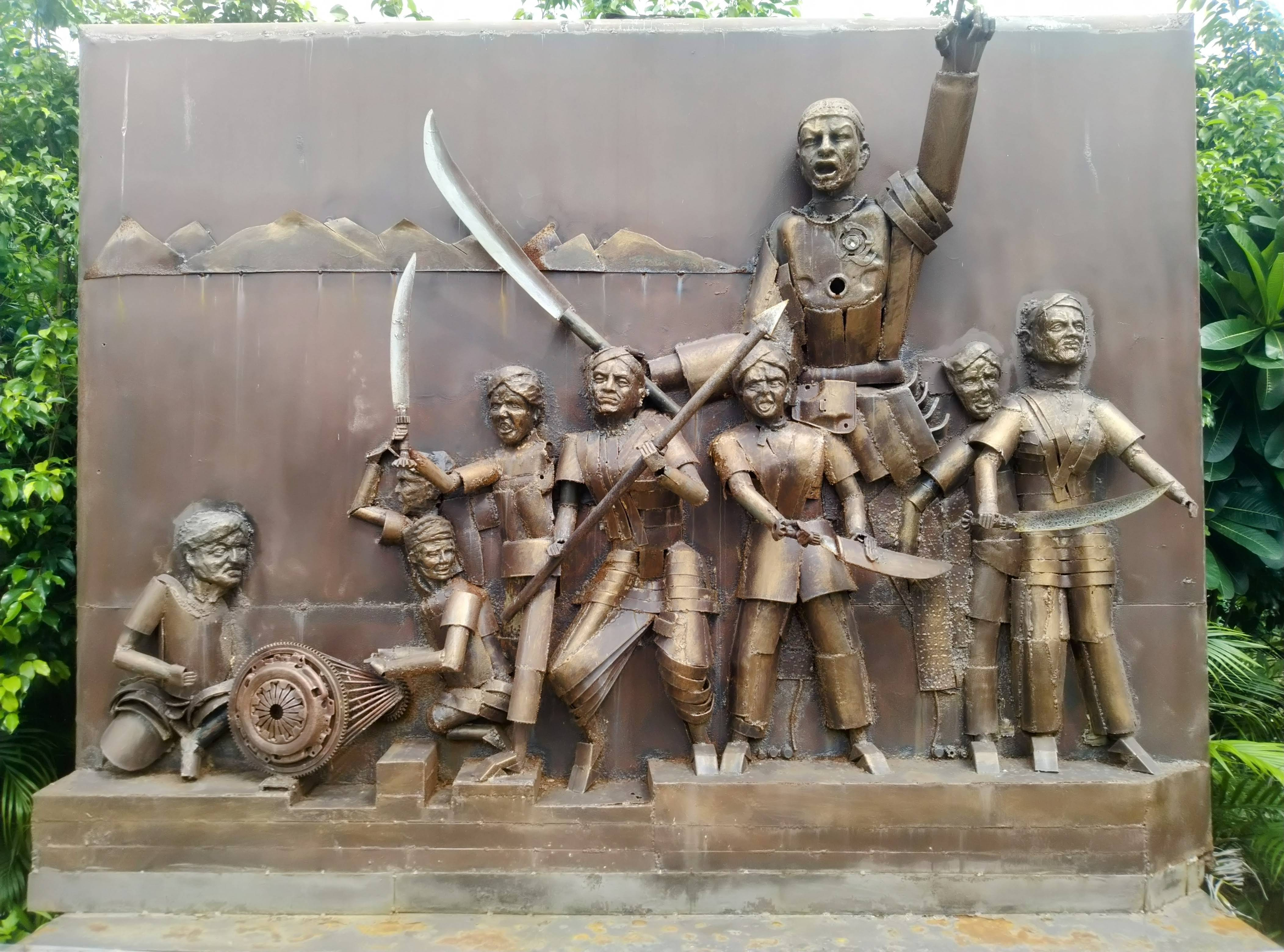
- Sculpture of the Ahom Rebellion in Shaheedi Park, Delhi.
- Date: 1828; 198 years ago
- Location: Deberapar Marangial Namghar, Toratoli, British India (present-day Jorhat, Assam, India)
- Goals: Withdrawal of British troops from Ahom territories
- Result: East India Company (British) victory

Parties
Gomdhar Konwar and his followers	East India Company

Lead figures
Gomdhar Konwar; Dhanjoi Borgohain; Jayram Kharagoria Phukan; Doha Konwar Phukan	Captain Neufville; Lieutenant Rutherforth

Casualties
- Arrested: Gomdhar Konwar
- Charged: Treason

Ahom Rebellion was an attempted uprising against the British East India Company in 1828 in Rangpur in present-day Assam. The rebellion was led by Gondhar Konwar, a prince of the Ahom dynasty, along with his followers. This is considered to be the first instance of a demand for independence from the British rule in Assam.

== Background ==
At the end of the first Anglo-Burmese War, the East India Company signed the treaty of Yandabo in 1826. According to this treaty, Burma was to give the land of Assam to the British. The British had previously promised the Ahom king and local chiefs that following the war, the British troops shall withdraw from their territory.

== The revolt and aftermath ==
Konwar, with the support of his counterparts Dhanjoi Borgohain and Jayram Kharagoria Phukan, charged at the British fort in Rangpur. The British, however, found out about the incoming ambush and were already prepared for it. The rebellion was suppressed near Deberapar Marangial Namghar, although the three leaders were able to escape and hide in the Naga Hills.

The East India Company pressured the kingdom to surrender Konwar to them, which they eventually did. Konwar was charged with treason and was sentenced to death. However, to maintain peaceful relations with the Ahom people, they reduced his sentence to seven years in exile. They also withdrew from the land as they had promised, and ceded it to the then Ahom king Purandar Singha.
