= Pulak Biswas =

Pulak Biswas (1941—29 August 2013) was a leading artist and children's book illustrator from India.

== Biography ==
Biswas was born in Dhaka, British India. After training at the Government College of Art, Kolkata, he worked for many years in the advertising industry. He was the recipient of an UNESCO fellowship for advanced studies in Graphic Design and Illustration. He also studied at Hornsey College, London, and the Rietvald Academy, Amsterdam.

He has also held several solo and group exhibitions in India and Europe.

== Children's literature ==
In the 80s, Biswas left advertising graphics and joined the cartoonist K. Shankar Pillai at the Children's Book Trust, New Delhi. In 1992–93, he won the National Award for Children's Literature in for Ashok's New Friend (written by Deepa Agarwal). Some of his other remarkable books are: Mahagiri and Amma Pyari Amma, A Day in the Life of Maya of Mohenjo-Daro, published by Children's Book Trust, Very busy ants (wordless classic) published by National Book Trust, Hen Sparrow Turns Purple" (winning the Grand Prix at the Biennale of Illustrations, Bratislava) and Catch that crocodile by Tara Publishers.

In 1999, his Tiger on a Tree written by Anushka Ravishankar, won the Biennial of Illustration Bratislava, and in 2005 was listed in the American Library Association's List of Notable Books.

== Death ==
Biswas spent last several years immersed in painting. He died on 29 August 2013.
