= Scharada Dubey =

Scharada Dubey (born 14 February 1961) is an Indian author of children's books and Creative non-fiction.

== Early life ==
Dubey was born in Jabalpur, Madhya Pradesh, to Ganesh Dutt Dubey and Madhu Dubey. Her father worked for the government-owned telecom department, and this job resulted in frequent transfers to different parts of the country as she was growing up, from Jammu to Nagpur, Calcutta and Hyderabad. The family finally settled in Mumbai in 1971, after which she completed school at Kendriya Vidyalaya, Colaba, and graduated from St. Xavier's College, Mumbai in 1980. During this time she was also the winner of the Annual Essay Competition held by the Royal Commonwealth Society in 1973.

== Career ==
Dubey married in 1984 and moved to Chennai. Subsequently, her work was published under the name Scharada Bail until her divorce in 2008. During this time she authored children's stories for the children's edition of The Hindu, won successive awards from the Children's Book Trust, as also published a number of children's books. Some of the books written by her at this time were Malwa on my Mind, a travelogue set in Central India, A Necessary Journey, about a fictional adventure and The Hanuman Heart, a book with stories for children about the Hindu deity Hanuman, among others.

In 2008, following her divorce, she reverted to her maiden name after being published for many years as Scharada Bail. She also relocated to Faizabad, Uttar Pradesh, where she lived for three years alongside the temple town of Ayodhya. This was how she wrote the book Portraits from Ayodhya: Living India’s Contradictions. Following this, she spent another two years in Uttar Pradesh in the capital city of Lucknow, before relocating once more. She presently lives and works in Pune, Maharashtra.

Dubey's children's books are described as introducing children to contemporary realities in an accessible and endearing manner. Her non-fiction work focuses on the lived experiences of ordinary people, and has been described as "humanising" the debate over the disputed site at Ayodhya through this method.

Dubey's most recent work Bol Bam (2013) is an account of the various spiritual journeys (yatras) made by devotees of Lord Shiva every year. Written as a travelogue, this book explores the various sites of Shiva pilgrimage across India through the author's own eyes as well as those of the many pilgrims who make these journeys. This book has been well received and commended for its honest style and portrayal of the human side of faith in modern India.

== Bibliography ==
=== Non-fiction ===
- The Toymakers: Light from India's Urban Poor, New Horizon Media (2008).
- Portraits from Ayodhya: Living India's Contradictions, Tranquebar-Westland (2012).
- Anna and Us: The Lokpal Story, Amazon Kindle e-book (2012)
- BOL BAM: Approaches to Shiva, Tranquebar-Westland (2013).

=== Children's books ===
- Footloose on the West Coast, Children's Book Trust (as Scharada Bail) (1998)
- Malwa on My Mind, Children's Book Trust (as Scharada Bail) (1999)
- A Necessary Journey, Children's Book Trust (as Scharada Bail) (2001)
- Icons of Social Change, Puffin/Scholastic (as Scharada Bail) (2004)
- The Hanuman Heart, Rupa (as Scharada Bail) (2005)
- Growing Up: Dealing with Picky Parents, Tiresome Teachers and Foul Friends, Scholastic (2006)
- The Best Days of My Life, Scholastic (2008)
- Movers and Shakers, Westland (2009)
- First Among Equals, Westland (2009)
- Monkeys in My Backyard: Living in Harmony with Animals, Scholastic (2011)
- I've Got it in Me: Words of Wisdom for Everyday Situations in School and at Home, Scholastic (2015)

=== Poetry ===
- Seeking Sanjeevani and Other Poems, Prakriti Foundation (2005)
