= Children's World =

Children's World may refer to:

- Children's World (charity), a United Kingdom-based charity focusing on special needs children
- Children's World (magazine), an Indian children's magazine
- Children's World (retailer), a former United Kingdom retail chain
- Detsky Mir, a Russian retail chain
- Jabłkowski Brothers#Vilnius store, a former name and later nickname of the universal shopping center in Vilnius, Lithuania

== See also ==
- Kids World (disambiguation)
