= Al Qattara Arts Centre =

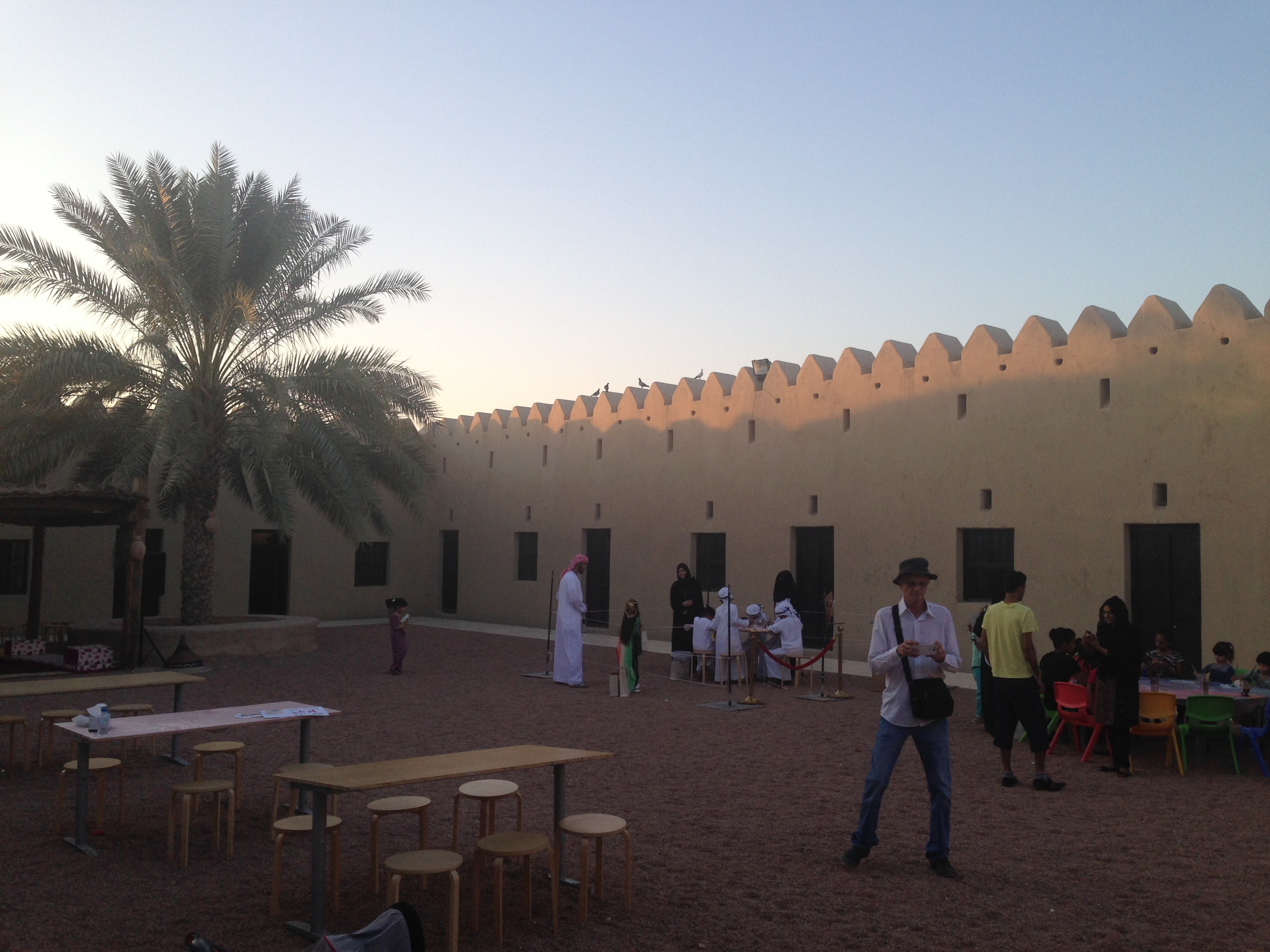
- Established: 2011
- Location: Al Ain, United Arab Emirates
- Coordinates: 24.260136°N 55.749095°E
- Type: Art gallery

The Al Qattara Arts Centre (Arabic: مركز القطارة للفنون) is an arts centre located in Al Ain, United Arab Emirates. The arts centre is dedicated to the art of the United Arab Emirates.

== History ==
The construction of the fort where the arts centre is located dates from the Iron Age. In 2007, the Abu Dhabi Authority for Culture & Heritage assigned Cultural Innovations to create an arts centre in the Al Qattara Fort complex. In 2011, the arts centre was inaugurated. In July 2019, the Department of Culture and Tourism launched a program for children at the arts centre. In August 2021, Bait Al Oud offered music classes at the arts centre. The excavations during the building of the Al Qattara Arts centre uncovered a five metre long sequence of archaeological layers, from the last Islamic period to the Iron Age, 3000 years ago.

== Collections ==
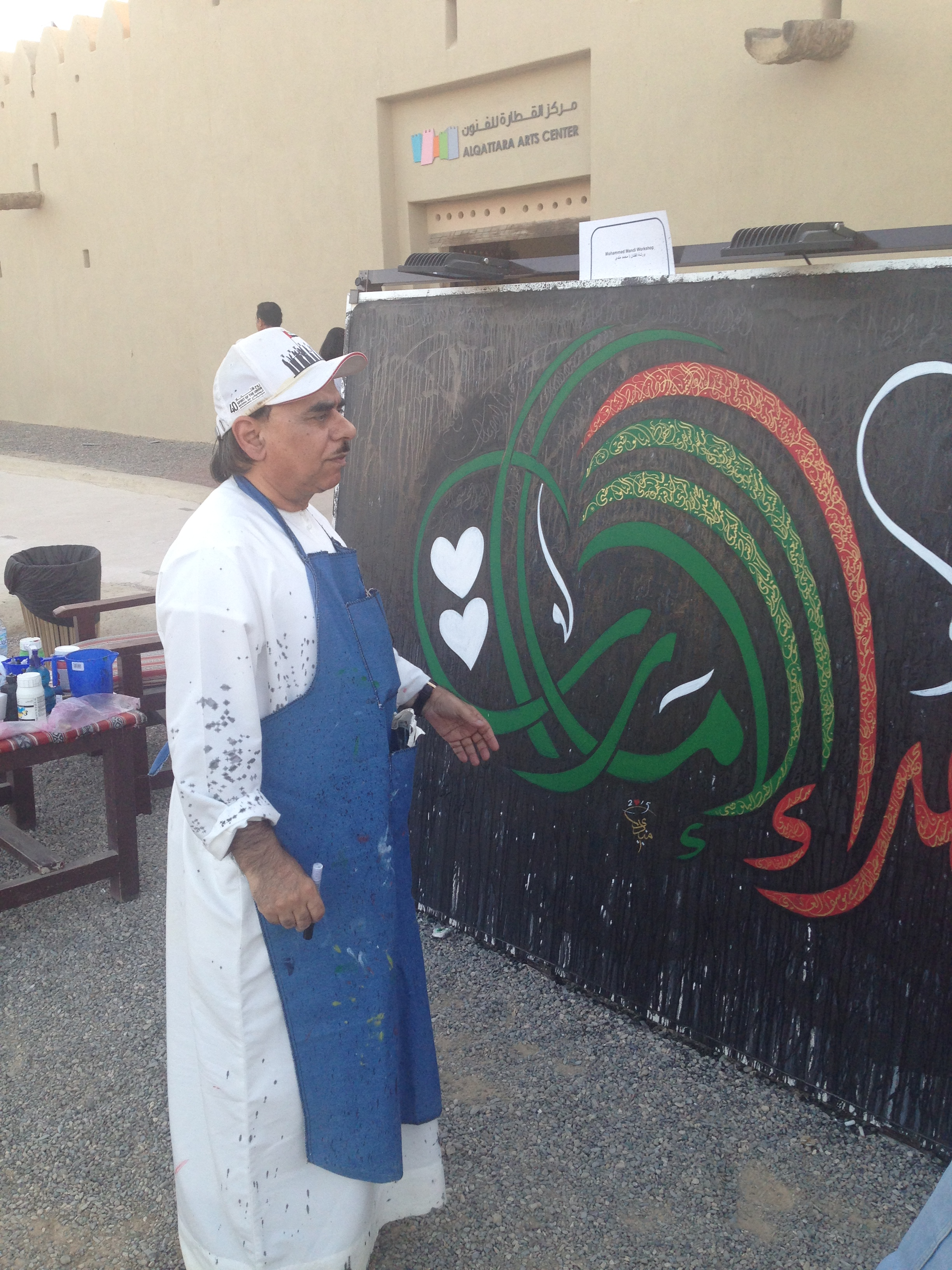
Calligrapher at Al Qattara Arts Center

The arts centre contains a small museum in which archaeological artefacts are stored. The archaeological exhibits contain relics found at sites and oases in Al Ain. The arts centre also has a music room, a calligraphy room, a computer room, a photography room and a pottery room. The arts center includes performance spaces. The arts centre contains works by Emirati artists such as Roudha Al Shamsi, Ghanem Younes, Saoud Al Dhaheri, Khalid Al Tamimi, Ahmad Saeed Al Areef Al Dhaheri, Sarah Aladayleh and Maryam Al Suwaidi. In 2018, the arts centre presented an exhibition about fashion illustration, in which it covers the variety of styles used by different designers. During 2021, the cultural centre presented an exhibition with themes on the commonalities between the United Arab Emirates and Saudi Arabia, as well as an exhibition on contemporary life in the Emirates. The arts centre also features murals by 12 artists from the United Arab Emirates. The arts centre has presented exhibits on traditional Arabic calligraphy, the history of the country and the Emirates Mars Mission.
