= Children's World (magazine) =

Children's magazine

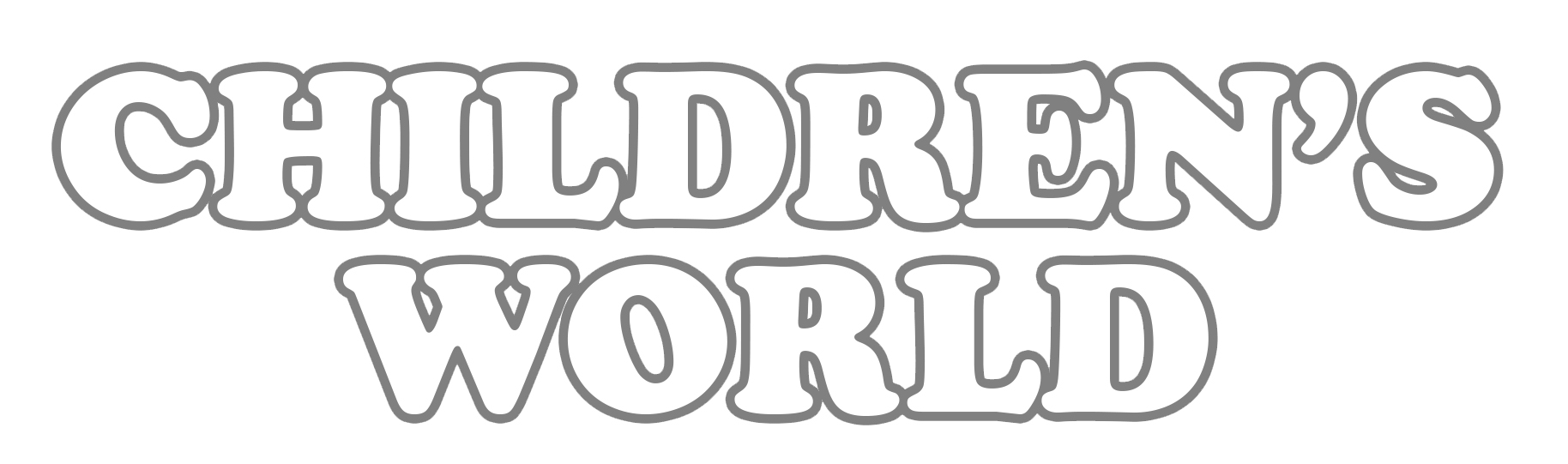
- Editor: Geeta Menon
- Categories: Children's Magazine, Education, Science, Reading, History, Nature
- Frequency: Monthly
- Founder: K. Shankar Pillai
- Founded: 1968
- Company: Children's Book Trust
- Country: India
- Based in: New Delhi
- Language: English
- Website: https://www.childrensbooktrust.com/childrens-magazine.html

Children's World is an India-based illustrated monthly children's magazine in English brought out by the house of Children's Book Trust, New Delhi. It was founded by K. Shankar Pillai, in 1968.The magazine was launched to encourage creative talent in children and provide a training ground for upcoming writers and illustrators enthusiastic to enter the field of children's literature. Children's World is the oldest English-language magazine for kids in India. The magazine contains stories, poems, comics, features and activities for children on a variety of themes including science, history, nature, space, sports, news and views, with an intent to broaden horizons and encourage creativity, imagination, empathy, skills and knowledge among children and enhance their logical and lateral thinking abilities. The current Editor of the magazine is Geeta Menon.

== History ==
The magazine has its beginnings in 1968 when Shankar decided to publish the spillover entries that came in Shankar's International Children's Competition, an annual international painting competition conducted by K.Shankar Pillai since 1949, in a weekly illustrated periodical to promote the spirit of creativity, scientific enquiry and patriotism among children. The inaugural issue was formally released on January 23, 1968 1968, by the then Union Finance Minister, Morarji Desai. The magazine switched to become a monthly in March 1972. The magazine was started and is owned by Children's Book Trust. The first monthly issue was published as the Annual Number in March 1972 and the magazine has since remained a monthly publication carrying features, stories, poems, book reviews, contests, and child-related activities sent in by child contributors and grown-ups who write for children.

== Editions ==
Children's World brings out two special issues each year, in April and in November. The April issue is the magazine's Annual Number, an issue with story contributions on a designated theme by writers, 18 years and above, of children literature. The selected theme each year pertains to contemporary discourse ideas relevant to children.

The November issue comprises prizewinning entries from the annual Your Pages Competition for children. School-going children are invited to send in their self-composed, original stories, poems, features, artworks, activities and more on any topic that interests them. The shortlisted entries are then thoughtfully illustrated and are published in the November special issue every year. The November edition exclusively carries content created by children. It is published to coincide with the celebration of Children's Day (November 14) in India.

== Content ==
Apart from the contributions from children and authors in children's literature in one-off stories/ features, Children's World also features a variety of series and columns that run in the magazine through the years. These include Book Reviews, Folk Tales, Fables, Historical Cities, Origins of Life on Earth, Engineering Marvels in History, Animal Stories, Endangered Species, Career Cues, War Memorials, Unconventional Sports, Adventure Tales from Around the World to name a few. In-Class Blog, another regular column, publishes contributions sent in by schools, under respective school's name.
