= Mickey Patel =

Indian cartoonist & illustrator (1941–1994)

- Born: 1941; Lahore, Pakistan
- Died: 1994 (aged 52–53)
- Education: Economics
- Alma mater: St. Stephen's College, Delhi
- Occupations: cartoonist, painter, designer, illustrator

Mickey Patel (1941–1994) was an Indian cartoonist and illustrator of books and magazines, as well as a painter and designer. He was born in 1941 in Lahore, currently Pakistan, and studied economics at St. Stephen's College, Delhi. In a tribute to Mickey Patel in Outlook magazine, Shobhita Punjia wrote that Mickey "only made it to evening art classes", but was soon drawing cartoons for Shankar's Weekly and Yojana. He later tried to make a living by working with advertising firms — Lintas, Thompson, ASP and Clarion". According to Punjia, besides the illustrations he was best known for, Patel also worked as a visualiser and animated film-maker. His work was shown in international exhibitions and he won many awards, including the Noma Concours awarded by UNESCO for picture book illustrations, which he was nominated for three times (1978, 1984, 1986).

As a freelance illustrator and cartoonist, Patel worked for newspapers and magazines such as India Today, Reader's Digest, Business Standard, Hindustan Times, Illustrated Weekly of India, as well as clients such as Air India, UNICEF, Oxford University Press (OUP), India Tourism Development Corporation (ITDC), and National Council of Educational Research and Training (NCERT), among others. He also did humorous greeting cards for Vakils in the 1960s, and cartoons for the Patriot, some of which can be seen in the Penguin Book of Indian Cartoons (1988).

Patel illustrated several children's books by Indian authors such as Ruskin Bond (Snake Trouble) and Sigrun Srivastava (The Ghost Rider of Darbhanga), as well as his own The Story of a Panther, published posthumously. Patel, as well as several other New Delhi illustrators, produced work for the National Book Trust. His titles for the National Book Trust include 1 to 10, The Best Thirteen, Stories From Bapu's Life, Rupa the Elephant, which were published in English, Hindi and other translated editions.

== Work ==
=== Written and illustrated ===
- 1 to 10 Procession: A Number Book by Mickey Patel (author, illustrator) (National Book Trust, 1985)
- Rupa the Elephant by Mickey Patel (author, illustrator) (National Book Trust, 1974)
- The Story of a Panther by Mickey Patel (author, illustrator) (Puffin Books, Ravi Dayal)

=== Illustrated ===
- Culture Shock! India by Gitanjali Kolanad, illustrated by Mickey Patel
- Dhammak Dham - Bachchon ke Geet by Kamla Bhasin, illustrated by Mickey Patel (Jagori)
- Let's Do a Play by Uma Anand, illustrated by Mickey Patel (National Book Trust)
- Mahatma Gandhi: A Story of Our Time and For All Time by Maurice David Japheth, illustrated by Mickey Patel. (Pearl Publications, 1968)
- Putki on Her Way to China by Sigrun Srivastava, illustrated by Mickey Patel
- Snake trouble by Ruskin Bond, illustrated by Mickey Patel (National Book Trust)
- Sona's Adventures by Tara Tiwari, illustrated by Mickey Patel (National Book Trust)
- Stories from Bapu's life by Uma Shankar Joshi, illustrated by Mickey Patel (National Book Trust, 1973)
- Story of the Road, by Poile Sengupta, illustrated by Mickey Patel
- The Best Thirteen, short story anthology, illustrated by Mickey Patel (National Book Trust)
- The Royal Journey to Heaven by Manoj Das, illustrated by Mickey Patel (Asian Cultural Centre for UNESCO)
- The Secret of Sickle-Moon Mountain by Margaret R. Bhatty, illustrated by Mickey Patel
- The Ghost Rider of Darbhanga and Other Stories by Sigrun Srivastav, illustrated by Mickey Patel
- Titbits for Tiki by Pratibha Nath, illustrated by Mickey Patel (Children's Book Trust)
- Ped by Safdar Hashmi, illustrated by Mickey Patel (Sahmat Prakashan, 1996)
- Nanhi pari ka janmdin, by Jayanti Adhikari, illustrated by Mickey Patel (Children's Book Trust, 1994)
