= Lahore International Book Fair =

Annual book fair in Lahore, Pakistan

Lahore International Book Fair is one of the largest and annually international book fair held in Lahore, Pakistan. It is held in Expo Center, Johar Town, Lahore for five days and receives thousands of people from different walks of life. It is a significant educational and cultural event in the city.

Lahore has been a centre for publications and to date holds that distinction as more than 80 percent of books in Pakistan and remains the centre of literary, educational and cultural activity in Pakistan. Around 165 local and foreign publishers and education-related organisations have set up stalls in the book fair on a variety of topics, including Islam, history, education, computer and information technology, engineering, business management, medical sciences, agriculture, literature, law and children literature. Foreign publishers represented in the book fair hail from regions such as Middle East, UK, United States and India. This year's book fair would be the first one in the spring (there was one in May, 2022) after a hiatus of 3 years due to COVID, and will run from March 1st to 5th.

== See also ==
- Karachi International Book Fair
- Abu Dhabi International Book Fair
- Cairo International Book Fair
- Sharjah International Book Fair
- Tehran International Book Fair
