= Tug Wilson (British Army officer) =

Edward "Tug" Wilson
- Born: 18 January 1921; West Hartlepool, Yorkshire
- Died: 2 January 2009 (aged 87); Abu Dhabi
- Burial place: St Andrew's Church, Abu Dhabi
- Military career
- Allegiance: United Kingdom
- Branch: British Army
- Service years: 1945—1971
- Rank: Colonel
- Nickname: "Tug"
- Service number: 360755
- Unit: Worcestershire Regiment
- Commands: Commander – Abu Dhabi Defence Force, Major – Worcestershire Regiment
- Awards: Order of the Star of Jordan; Mentioned in dispatches Abu Dhabi Award

Colonel Edward Bearby "Tug" Wilson (18 January 1921 – 2 January 2009) was the founder and first commander of the Abu Dhabi Defence Force, the forerunner of the current UAE Armed Forces. He was a personal friend of Sheikh Zayed, with whom he shared interests in falconry and horseback riding, establishing the United Arab Emirates (UAE) Royal Stables in 1974.

== Early life ==
Edward Bearby Wilson was born at West Hartlepool, County Durham, on 18 January 1921 and educated at Ayton Friends' School, North Riding then Constantine College, Middlesbrough. Always known as "Tug", he trained as a wireless operator and was selected for officer training at Royal Military Academy Sandhurst in 1945.

== Military career ==
On being commissioned into the Worcestershire Regiment, he was posted to the 1st Battalion in BAOR, then seconded to the 2nd Division Signal Regiment, taking part in the Berlin airlift, before serving in Malaya during the Emergency, where he was mentioned in dispatches.

In 1952, after spending the winter in Korea, Wilson was posted to the Battle School at Hara Mura, Japan, in order to train the British contingent. During this time, he dislocated both his shoulders when a grenade exploded during a training accident.

In 1961 and now a major back with the Worcestershire Regiment, he volunteered for service with the Trucial Oman Scouts, commanding "A" Squadron in an old fort at the Buraimi Oasis, Al Ain. The area was then part of a British protectorate in the Persian Gulf and now forms part of the United Arab Emirates (UAE).

After Sheikh Zayed bin Sultan Al Nahyan became the UAE's ruler in 1966, Colonel Wilson established the Abu Dhabi Defence Force, the forerunner of the UAE's current Armed Forces and was appointed its first commander, a post he held until 1968. Wilson was a good friend of Sheikh Zayed; indeed he was instrumental in placing Sheikh Zayed as Ruler of Abu Dhabi after the overthrow of his elder brother Sheikh Shakhbut bin Sultan on 6 August 1966.

== Retirement and death ==
After being recalled from Abu Dhabi in 1969, he was an instructor at the Royal Naval College, Greenwich, and then at the Staff College, Camberley, before retiring from the Army in 1971. He moved to Devon and established a successful trout farm business.

In 1974, he accepted an invitation from Sheikh Zayed to return to Abu Dhabi as director of the royal stables. Over the next 30 years, and until Sheikh Zayed's death, Wilson developed the stables into one of the world's top centres for Arabian horses.

In 1990, he took part in the London-Beijing Motor Challenge, driving almost 10,000 miles.

In 2005, Wilson was awarded the annual Abu Dhabi Award for his services to the country.

After a brief illness, he died on 2 January 2009, two weeks short of his 88th birthday.

He married Patricia Valentine (née McLeary) in 1971. She predeceased him. They had one son.

== Legacy ==
Wilson's photographs of Abu Dhabi, the Colonel Edward "Tug" Bearby Wilson Collection, are now held in the collection of the Abu Dhabi Authority for Culture & Heritage.
