= Atanu Roy =

Atanu Roy (born 1952) is an Indian illustrator and cartoonist from New Delhi, who has illustrated more than a hundred books for children. Roy studied at the Delhi College of Art, and illustrated his first book while he was still a student, a black and white book about the history of transportation. After graduating, he worked with publishers Rajpal & Sons, where he did book covers and illustrated the works of writers such as Amrita Pritam and Agyeya. He then worked with the India Today group as art director of the children's magazine Target, where he also illustrated the joke pages. He has received many international awards and prizes for cartooning and illustration.

== Career ==
As a children's book illustrator, Roy's first real picture book was a book on Tails for the National Book Trust (NBT). He went on to create several other titles for NBT, adopting a bold style with strong black outlines and vivid colors to compensate for the low-grade paper on which NBT titles were printed. Roy has also worked on books and associated educational aids for pre-school children, including games and puzzles, with various publishers in New Delhi. In an interview to the newspaper DNA, Roy described the requirements for his job in these words: "The most important skill is not to be condescending towards children and to have a good sense of humour. It is also very important to feel for the needs of each age group and create a style. A lot of background work for the right references to be visually accurate and use of detail and action to grab the child's attention is essential. A child is more interested in the content and not your name or fame."

Some of Roy's best work as an illustrator appears in The Puffin Book of Magical Indian Myths, where his illustrations draw on various Indian art styles. "My idea was to make the book essentially Indian so I tried to use mostly earthy colours and occasionally demonstrate the influence of our painting traditions", Roy said in an interview. Describing the thought process behind his dark illustrations, Roy told Time Out Mumbai that he did not think of his audience as children, but "more as my equals, perfectly capable of understanding adult matters”. This is why he did not hesitate in depicting the dark, violent aspects of Indian mythology.

== Work ==
=== As illustrator ===
- The Puffin Book of Magical Indian Myths by Anita Nair, illustrated by Atanu Roy (Puffin, 2008)
- Wingless, a fairy tale by Paro Anand, with illustrations by Atanu Roy (IndiaInk, 2003)
