= Shankar Memorial National Cartoon Museum and Art Gallery =

- Shankar Smaraka Cartoon museum
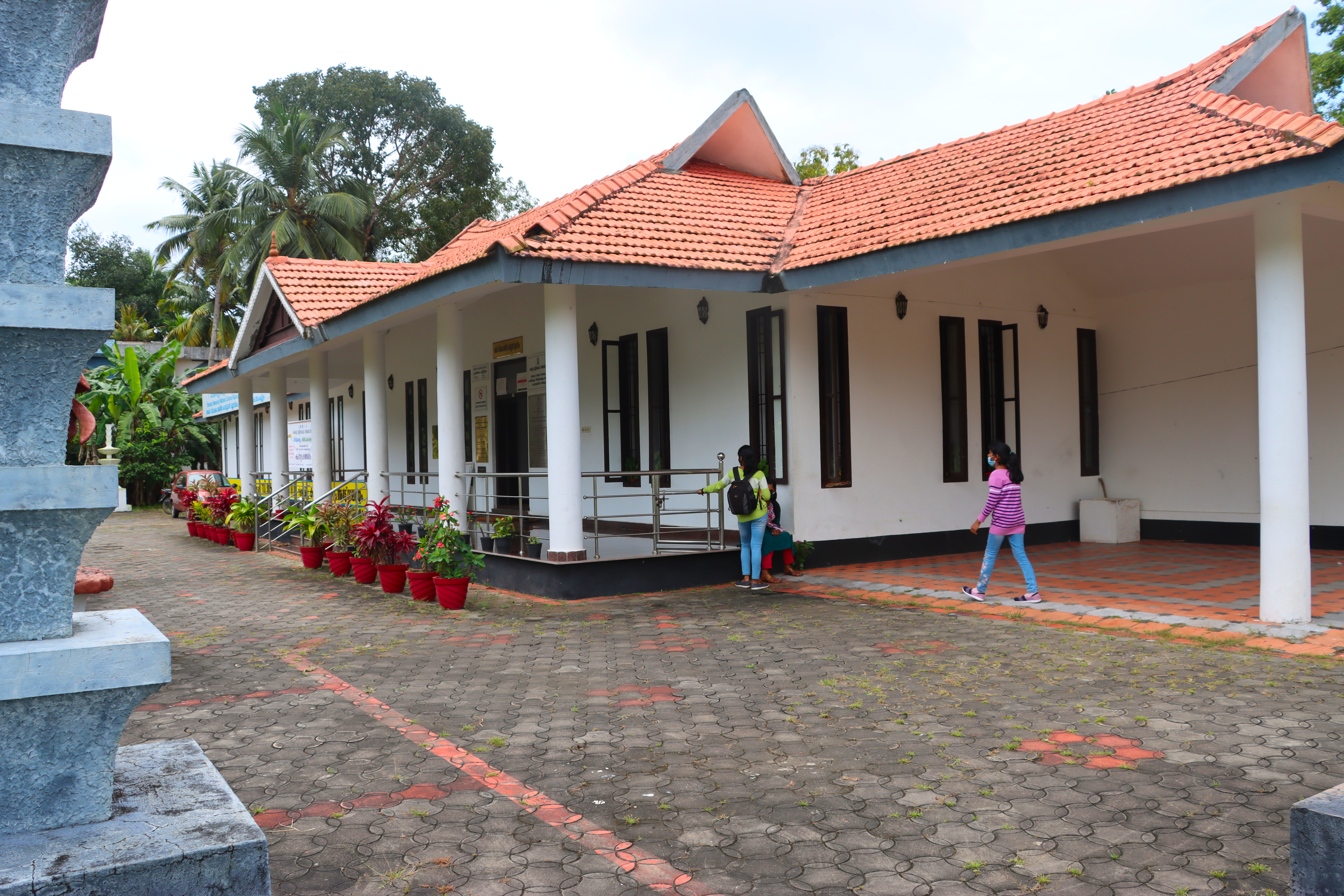
- Shankar Memorial National Cartoon Museum and Art Gallery
- Established: 2014
- Location: Krishnapuram, Kayamkulam, Kerala
- Coordinates: 09.15°N 76.531°E
- Type: Art museum
- Directors: Kerala Lalithakala Akademi, Kerala Government

Shankar Memorial National Cartoon Museum and Art Gallery is an art museum established by the Kerala Lalithakala Akademi under the Government of Kerala, India, in 2014, as a tribute to the renowned Indian cartoonist Shankar. The institution is situated at Krishnapuram in Kayamkulam which is the home town of Shankar, in Kerala.
