= Shankar's International Dolls Museum =

Museum in India

Coordinates: 28°37′49″N 77°14′30″E

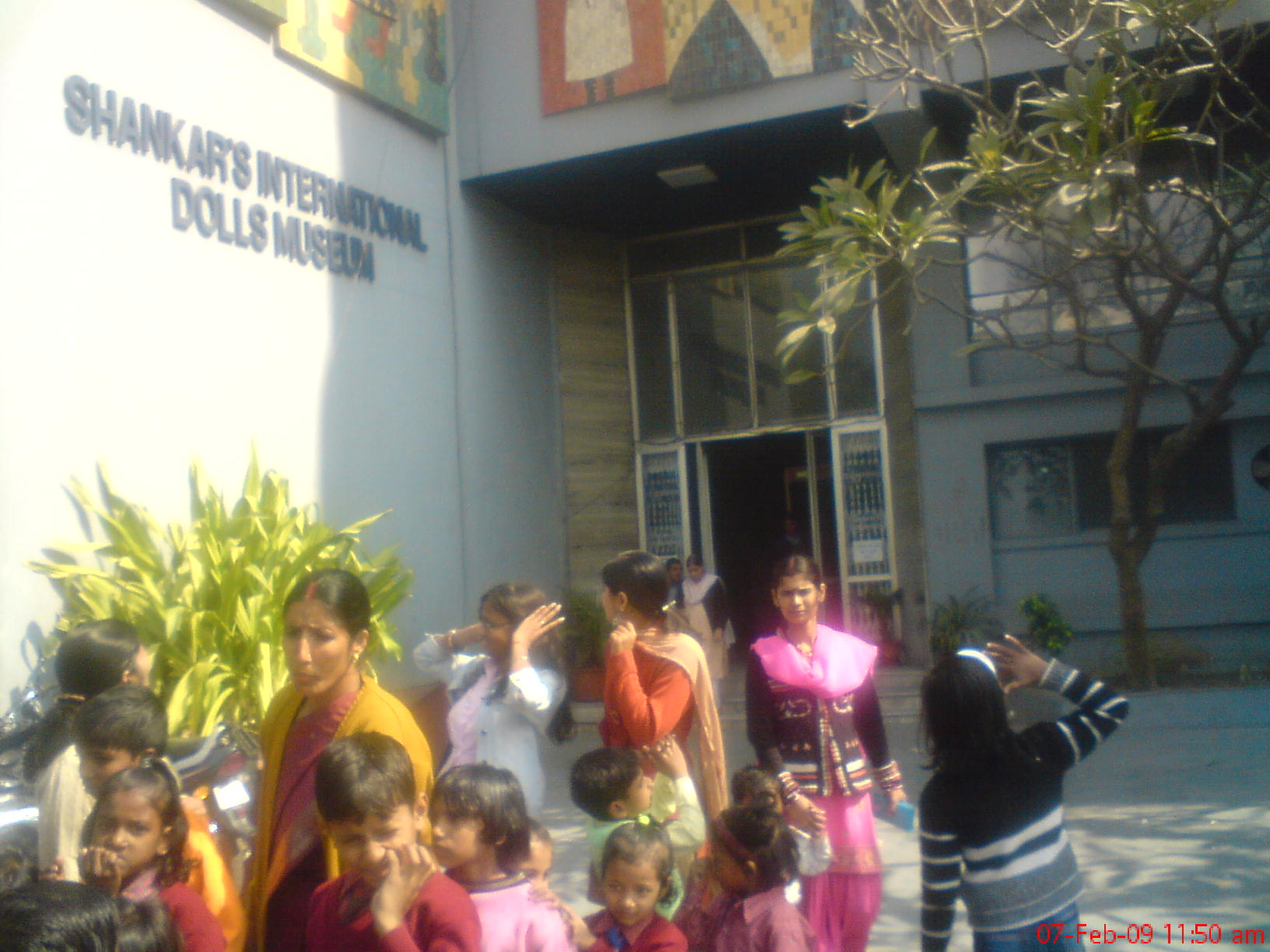
- Established: 30 November 1965
- Location: Nehru House, 4 Bahadur Shah Zafar Marg, New Delhi-110002
- Collection size: 6,500 Dolls
- Website: Children's Book Trust - Doll Museum

The International Dolls Museum is a large collection of dolls in New Delhi, though part of Central Delhi, Delhi, India. It was set up by K. Shankar Pillai, a political cartoonist. Housed in the Children's Book Trust building on Bahadur Shah Zafar Marg, accessed through a separate entrance, a winding staircase, leading up to a foyer. The museum has a floor area of 5,184.5 sq ft (481.66 m^{2}) and occupies a portion of the first floor.

== History ==
K. Shankar Pillai (1902–1989), noted cartoonist, set up Children's Book Trust, a pioneering work in the field of children's literature in India, in 1957. Later, a gift of a doll from a Hungarian diplomat gave Shankar the idea of collecting dolls from countries he visited. He often held exhibitions for poor children, and at one exhibition in Delhi, among the hundreds of visitors were the then Prime Minister Jawaharlal Nehru accompanied by his daughter Indira Gandhi. Indira was inspired and together with Shankar set up an international museum for dolls, eventually materializing on 30 November 1965.

The principal collection consists of gifts from Prime Minister, Jawaharlal Nehru, and many subsequent Prime Ministers, including Indira Gandhi and Rajiv Gandhi. Also several embassies and diplomatic missions in Delhi gifted dolls to the museum. Visiting dignitaries like Madame Tito, Queen Frederika of Greece, the Queen of Thailand, the sister of Shah of Iran, the wives of Presidents of Mexico and Indonesia and many others gifted dolls representing their respective nations

Dolls Museum is one of the most renowned museums in New Delhi which has a huge collections of dolls from across the globe. The renowned political cartoonist, K. Shankar Pillai (1902–1989) founded this museum in 1965 with thousand dolls. The museum covers an area of 5,184.5 square feet (481.66 m^{2}). The former President of India, Dr. S. Radhakrishnan inaugurated the Dolls Museum and at the inauguration time the number of dolls was only 500. In between 1965 and in 1987, the number of dolls has risen to 5,000, a vast majority coming as gifts. Shankar Pillai was honoured with the Padma Vibhushan, India's second highest civilian award by Government of India in 1976.

Today the volume has increased to 6,500 exhibits from almost 85 countries, adding to its international character.

== The location ==
The museum is located in the Children's Book Trust building on Bahadur Shah Zafar Marg, New Delhi near Ram Charan Agrawal Chowk. It occupies a floor area of 5,184.5 square feet (481.66 m^{2}) on the first floor. A separate entrance with a winding staircase leads up to a foyer.

== Layout ==
Inside, the Museum is divided into two equal halves. The two sections have over 160 glass cases, 1,000 ft long (300 m), mounted on the walls. One section has exhibits from Europe, the U.S., Australia, New Zealand, Common Wealth of Independent States and the other from Asian countries, the Middle East, Africa and India.

== The collection ==
The collections of dolls are classified into two parts. One part consists of the dolls collected from western countries such as UK, USA, Australia, New Zealand, Commonwealth of Independent States and the other section consists of dolls collected from other Asian and African countries including India.

The main collections of Dolls Museum are of 150 types of Indian costume dolls created at the own workshop of the museum which is located inside the museum. The craftsmen create the dolls with utmost perfection to create a symphony of the physical features, costumes and ornaments. In the pageant are characters from India's unique classical dance, Kathakali, with its lavish costumes. Other dolls of special interest are Boys and Girls Festival dolls from Japan, replica Dolls of the Queen's collection (UK), Maypole Dance from Hungary, Kabuki and Samurai dolls from Japan, Flamenco dancers from Spain, Women's Orchestra from Thailand, and Kandy Pehara from Sri Lanka.

The dolls of Dolls Museum even was awarded first prize namely Golden Peacock Feather at the Dolls Biennale that was held in Cracow, Poland in 1980. The major attractions of this museum are Kabuki and Samurai dolls from Japan, Maypole dance replica dolls of Hungary, UK's Queen collections, Orchestra of women from Thailand, etc.

Besides, dolls representing various countries, there is also a special display of a representative collection of over 150 dolls in Indian costume dolls. There are dolls showing various Indian dances and cultures, regional costumes, pairs of bride and grooms of various states, a group of dolls showing how to wear a saree. These were made at the Dolls Workshop attached to the Museum. Indian dolls made at the workshop are exchanged for gifts received from abroad as well as sold to collectors and museums in India and abroad. Each doll is handcrafted after meticulous research into the physical attributes, dress and jewellery of individual characters. The museum also runs a "clinic" for "sick" dolls, where rare deteriorating dolls are restored.

== Business hours ==
The museum is open from 10 a.m. to 6.00 p.m. without any lunch break. The ticket counter closes at 5.30 p.m. Remains closed on Monday and other gazetted holidays.

== See also ==
- Rajkot - doll museum
