= Kids World =

Kids World or Kid's World may refer to:

- Kid's World, a former themed area at the Dreamworld theme park, Gold Coast, Australia
- Kid's World (amusement park), Long Branch, New Jersey, USA
- KidsWorld, a Canadian magazine
- Kids World (film), a 2001 children's film

== See also ==
- Children's World (disambiguation)
- Child World, an American chain of toy stores
