= Shaheedi Park =

Open air museum in Delhi, India

- Śahīdī Pārka
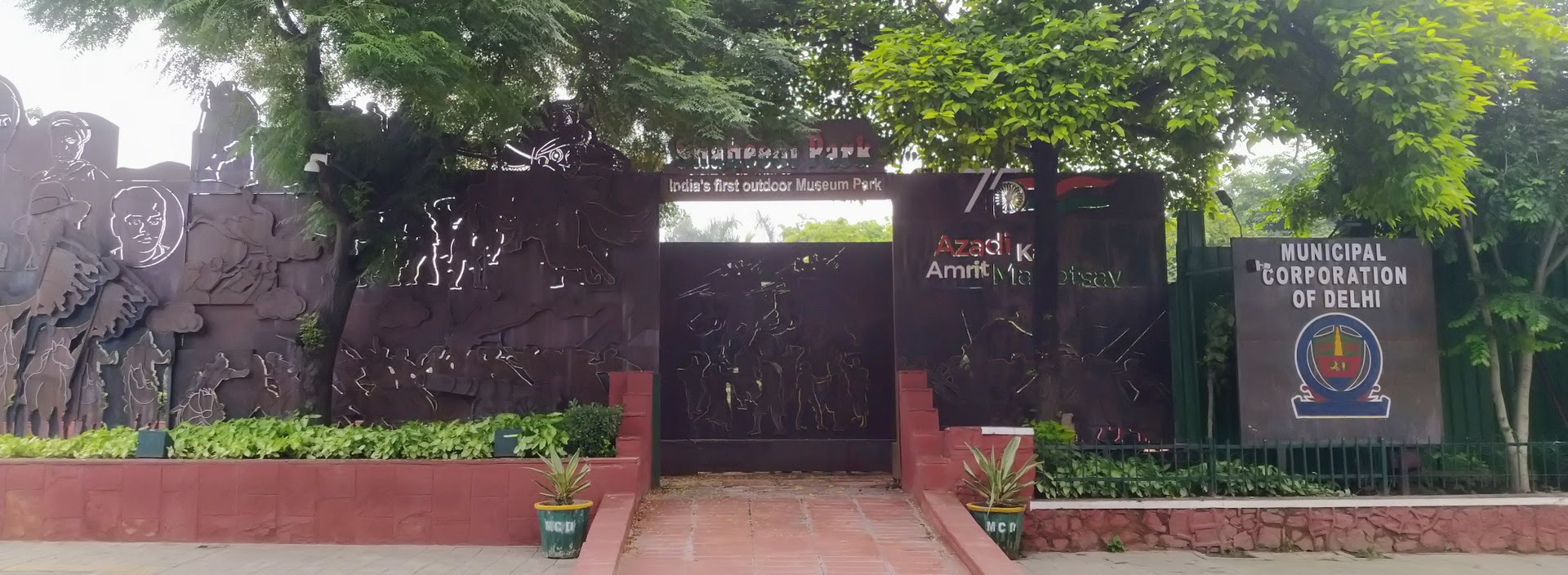
- Shaheedi Park from the outside

- Location of Shaheedi Park in Delhi
- Former name: Shaheed Bhagat Singh Park
- Established: 9 August 2023; 2 years ago
- Location: Bahadur Shah Zafar Marg, Central Delhi, India
- Coordinates: 28°38′03.7″N 77°14′0.8″E
- Type: Biographical museum
- Key holdings: Establishment site of Hindustan Socialist Republican Association by Sachindranath Sanyal
- Collections: Upcycling
- Collection size: 106
- Founders: Vinai Kumar Saxena (lieutenant governor); Arvind Kejriwal (chief minister)
- Owner: Municipal Corporation of Delhi
- Public transit access: ITO metro station
- Parking: Yes

Shaheedi Park (ISO: Śahīdī Pārka, transl. Martyrdom Park) is an outdoor museum park located on Bahadur Shah Zafar Marg in Delhi, India. Covering an area of 4.5 acres (18,000 m^{2}), displaying sculptures, memorials and installations that portray prominent figures and historical eras from Indian history. The park was developed by the Municipal Corporation of Delhi (MCD) as a part of its Waste to Art initiative.

The collections of the museum have been made using various parts such as old trucks, cars, electricity poles, pipes, angle irons and rickshaws collected by the MCD. It is the first outdoor museum of India, and the third Waste to Art park of Delhi.

== History ==
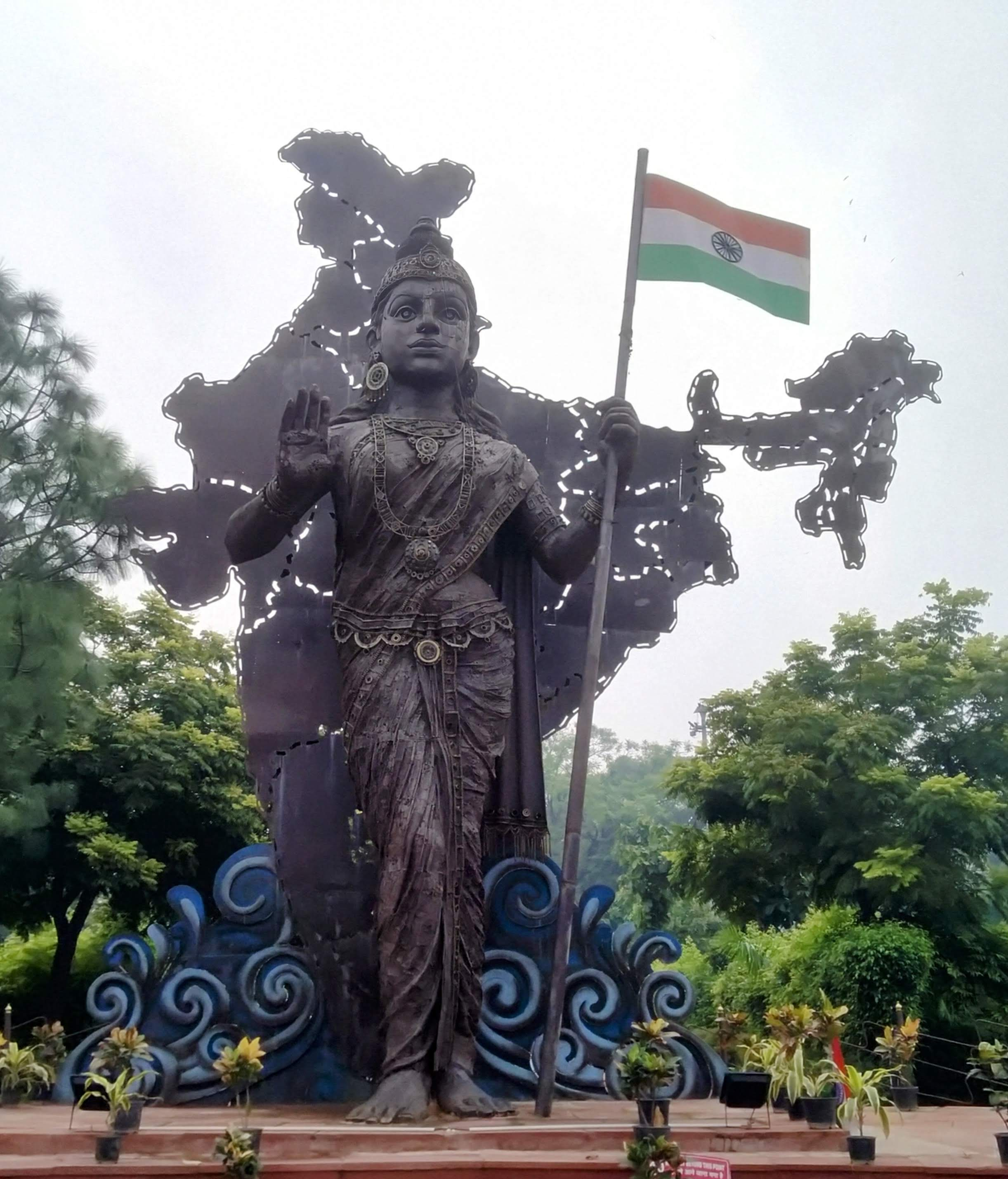
Statue of Bharat Mata in the middle of the park.

Shaheedi Park was inaugurated by the lieutenant governor of Delhi, Vinai Kumar Saxena, and the chief minister of Delhi, Arvind Kejriwal, on a land of 4.5 acres (1.8 ha). The project was estimated to be at around a cost of ₹16.5 crore (US$1.7 million). The park was planned to be opened to the public to commemorate the death anniversary of Bhagat Singh, Sukhdev and Rajguru.

On the inauguration of the park, Kejriwal stated, "all of us together have to make our Delhi clean as well. The MCD is launching many projects to make Delhi clean. We hope to see the results soon." A film was also screened on the day of the inauguration, during which the mayor of Delhi, Shelly Oberoi and the deputy mayor Aaley Mohammad Iqbal were also present. Later, Kejriwal also stated that visiting the park should be made compulsory for all the schools in Delhi.

In the first month of its inauguration, the park received only 4,500 visitors, generating a mere ₹3.37 lakh (US$3,500) of revenue. This poor reception was attributed to it being an open air museum, discouraging tourists from visiting the park in the summer. Moreover, the location of the park being close to the busy Bahadur Shah Zafar Marg road and its small size also contributed to the lack of appeal to visit the museum. Even after 2.5 months of the inauguration, the park only received 10,000 visitors. The expensive tickets were also believed to be one of the reasons behind the poor response.

On 19 November 2023, to increase the footfall, the entrance fee for the park during weekdays was reduced from ₹100 (US$1.00) to ₹50 (52¢ US), whereas the entry for children studying in schools managed by the Municipal Corporation of Delhi was made free.

On 23 March 2024, upon the arrest of Arvind Kejriwal, the Aam Aadmi Party called for a protest at Shaheedi Park. The park is located close to Deendayal Upadhyaya Marg, near which the headquarter of the Bharatiya Janata Party is located. The party workers were stopped by the Delhi Police at ITO Chowk. The protest was also joined by the Indian National Congress. Bhagwant Mann, the chief minister of Punjab, stated,

"When the country became independent in 1947, we got the right to vote and began electing leaders for the country ourselves. But today, the souls of Bhagat Singh, Rajguru, and Sukhdev must be agonizing to see that the democracy for which sacrifices were made is no longer alive in that country."

== Exhibits ==
The sculptures in the park were designed by 10 artists and 700 artisans over a period of six months. It was reported that 250 tonnes of scrap was recycled to create these sculptures. The park displays the sculptures and information on many martyrs, sages and freedom fighters of India. These include notable leaders from the golden age of India, the Indian Rebellion of 1857, the Maratha Confederacy, the Indian independence movement, Social reformers of India, the Swadeshi movement and the Constituent Assembly of India among others. In the centre of the park, a statue of Bharat Mata has been installed, holding the flag of India. Out of all the sculptures made in the park, 22 of them are 3D while the rest are 2D.
