= Pearl Rating System (Abu Dhabi) =

The Pearl Rating System is the green building rating system developed by the Abu Dhabi Urban Planning Council as part of their sustainable development initiative, Estidama. The system can be applied to communities, buildings and villas, with different requirements for each.

The pearl rating system is divided into buildings, villas, and communities, each with a scale of one to three pearls.

Similar to LEED, the Pearl Rating System has various levels of certification. ranging from one to three pearls. For all new development projects within the emirate of Abu Dhabi, a minimum certification of one pearl is required (two pearls for government buildings). This certification requirement was mandated by the Executive Council of Abu Dhabi and went into effect in Autumn of 2010.

There are three stages of certification associated with the Pearl Rating System. The first stage is the Pearl Design Rating that requires the building permit for its success. The second stage is the Pearl Construction Rating that needs the certificate of completion. The third, and yet to be developed stage, is the Pearl Operations Rating.

Training seminars of various lengths and technical depths are available for all of the Pearl Rating Systems. Training seminars are currently being delivered by the WSP Group and Oger International on behalf of the Urban Planning Council, Abu Dhabi.

Individuals interested in working on Pearl Rated projects should look into becoming Pearl Qualified Professionals (PQPs); The PQP test was developed by Prometric due to the requirement that at least one Pearl Qualified Professional must be on the project planned for development within the emirate of Abu Dhabi. Those interested in the PQP test should contact the CERT center in Abu Dhabi and the AMIDEAST testing center in Dubai.

Based on a review by Abu Dhabi’s Urban Planning Council (UPC), up to five pearls can be awarded. One pearl is mandatory for all developments and is based on the building code. As per Information Bulletins No. 1 dated 6 December 2010 all Abu Dhabi government projects are required to achieve two pearls. Two pearls include all the mandatory requirements as well as additional optional credits.

To date the only projects to achieve three pearls include the Abu Dhabi Midfield Terminable Building and ten unspecified Abu Dhabi Education Council (ADEC) schools.
