= Abu Dhabi Tourism Authority =

Defunct tourism agency in the UAE

Abu Dhabi Tourism Authority (ADTA)
Agency overview
- Formed: 2004
- Dissolved: 2 October 2012
- Superseding agency: Abu Dhabi Department of Culture and Tourism
- Jurisdiction: Emirate of Abu Dhabi
- Agency executives: Sultan bin Tahnoon Al Nahyan, Chairman; Ahmed Al Mazrouei, Vice Chairman; Mubarak Hamad Al Muhairi, Director General
- Website: www.abudhabitourism.ae

Abu Dhabi Tourism Authority (ADTA) was a statutory body in the United Arab Emirates established in 2004 under the Government of Abu Dhabi’s economic diversification strategy. The authority had wide-ranging responsibilities for the promotion and development of the emirate’s tourism industry and international positioning as a destination of distinction.

ADTA worked closely with all the emirate's tourism industry stakeholders in the private and public sectors. These bodies included aviation infrastructure and transport suppliers, airlines, destination management companies, accommodation providers and meetings organisers. Together they adopted a collaborative approach to promoting the emirate as an up-market destination with a focus on sustaining and preserving its natural environment and heritage.

ADTA's activities included destination marketing, infrastructure and product development and regulation and classification. The authority had built up an expansive portfolio of major events including the annual European Tour-based Abu Dhabi Golf Championship; the Abu Dhabi Junior Golf Championship; the Al Ain Aerobatics Show; Gourmet Abu Dhabi; the Abu Dhabi Desert Challenge, the Abu Dhabi Red Bull Air Race and the six-weeks long 'Summer in Abu Dhabi' family carnival. It is also a headline sponsor of the Abu Dhabi Yacht Show and actively supports the World Rally Championship through its BP-Ford Team Abu Dhabi alliance, which also extended to sponsorship of reigning Red Bull Air Race champion Hannes Arch and international powerboat and triathlon squads.

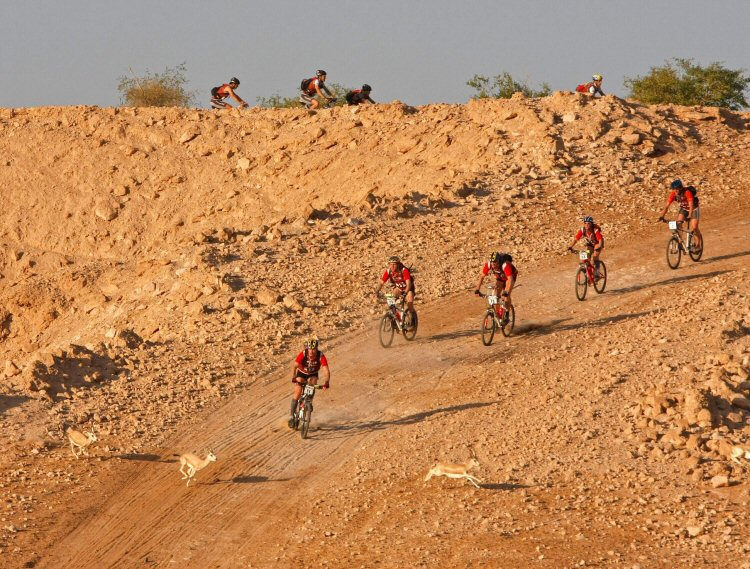
Maountainbiking at Abu Dhabi Adventure Challenge 2008 - ADTA

ADTA also served as a catalyst in driving inward tourism investment, growth and development. A key initiative in its inward investment strategy was the creation, in 2006 of the Tourism Development and Investment Company (TDIC), the authority's tourism asset management and development arm.

The Abu Dhabi Tourism and Culture Authority (TCA) was established in February 2012 replacing the Abu Dhabi Authority for Culture & Heritage (ADACH) and the Abu Dhabi Tourism Authority.
