= Metro Now =

Newspaper in Delhi, India

Metro Now is a joint venture of The Times of India and the Hindustan Times, and is published by the Metropolitan Media Co Ltd. It was set up by Bennett & Coleman and HT Media. Launched on 5 February 2006, it is edited by Mr. Kamlesh Singh. Brought out in tabloid format, Metro Now will target the metro commuters in Delhi, a growing population.

Metro Now is the first morning tabloid. After a decade-long battle between The Times of India and the Hindustan Times, it was a surprise when they set up a joint venture, and came up with this colourful tabloid, which is targeted at readers who don't have sufficient time to read lengthy stories. It is said that the move is to counter the launch of the Delhi edition of Mumbai's DNA [Daily News & Analysis].

Sameer Kapoor, the CEO of Metropolitan Media Co Ltd, said "This product will set new benchmarks in the compact newspaper segment in India. It is aimed at the youth, age no bar. It's the newspaper for the young at heart. It has a fresh new look and a new content mix that will revive the newspaper-reading habit among the youth." 'It's fun, friendly and essentially Delhi,' added Metro Now editor Kamlesh Singh. 'Though the newspaper is city-centric, it will also have extensive coverage of India and the world. But always with a twist. It will be Delhi's perfectly balanced newspaper to go with the perfectly balanced coffee.'

Metro Now has been described as the compact, international style newspaper.

Metro Now published its last edition on 22 January 2009. The media house plans to print Metro Now as a weekly from January 24. It will be distributed free along with The Times of India and Hindustan Times every Saturday in Gurgaon.
