= Gomdhar Konwar =

Prince of Ahom royal family of Assam

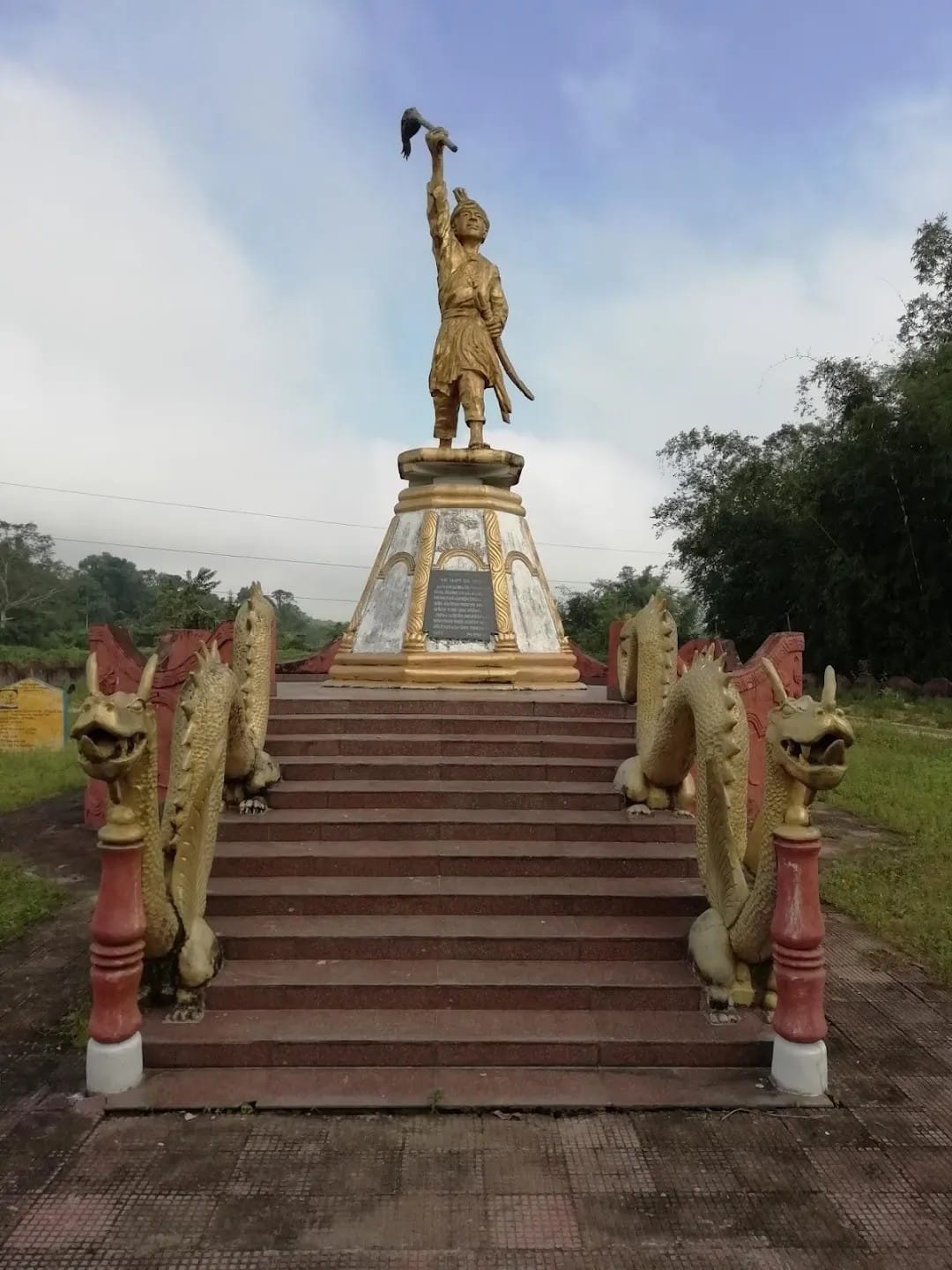
- Born: c.1807 Lakwa, Assam, British India
- Died: c.1849 Toratali, Assam, British India
- Occupation: Ahom royal prince
- Known for: Indian independence activist
- Parent: Phena Konwar (father)

Gomdhar Konwar (Assamese: গোমধৰ কোঁৱৰ; c. 1807 – c. 1849) was an Ahom prince known for having led one of the first revolts against the British in India. Konwar was declared the last King of Assam.

== Ancestry ==
Gomdhar Konwar was the son of Phena Konwar, a descendant of the Ahom dynasty.

== 1828 rebellion ==
=== Prelude ===
By end of 1828 the process extension of British dominion into Assam was completed. With the assumption of the political power by the officers of the East India Company, the ruling Ahom monarchy lost not only their political authority but social privileges too. The feudal structure of the society began to crumble as new measures were adopted by the colonial rulers to strip the nobility of their rights and privileges. Their enthusiasm for their new friend, who aided them in driving out the Burmese from Assam, soon disappeared and supporters of monarchy began to organize themselves to restore the old Ahom monarchy and oust the British.

=== Declaration as King ===
A group of former Ahom nobles led by Dhanajoy Borgohain rallied around Ahom Prince Gomdhar Konwar of Assam. He was formally declared the King of Assam in the presence of priests and enthroned at Toratoli Bosa bahor near Jorhat according to Ahom rites.

Gomdhar Konwar recruited soldiers, gathered arms and ammunitions and began preparing for an armed struggle against the British. The aim was to capture Rangpur, the erstwhile capital of the Ahom Kingdom.

=== Downfall and imprisonment ===
But before he could make much headway a counter offensive was made by the British led by Lieutenant Rutherford near Deberapar Marangial Namghar. The rebels lost and Gomdhar fled to the Naga Hills. But, soon he and his associates were arrested by the British. Gomdhar was found guilty of “illegally assuming the Insignia of Royalty” and sentenced to death. This sentence was subsequently commuted to seven years of imprisonment in banishment and was deported to an unknown location to die in ignominy.

== Descendants ==
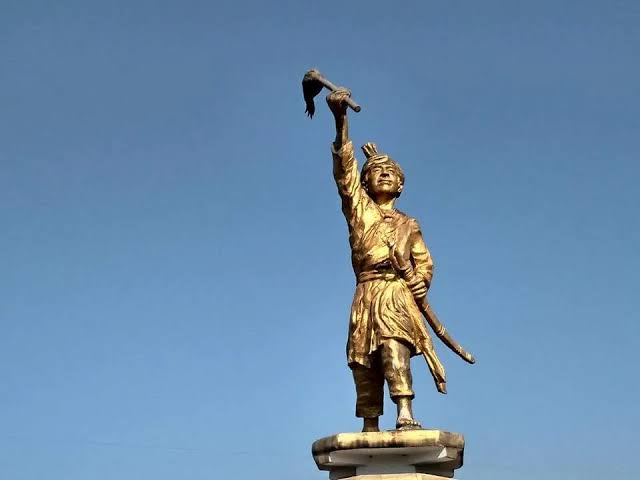
Statue of Gomdhar Konwar, India's first Freedom Fighter and Assam's last King of Ahom Dynasty.

Purneshwar Rajkonwar, a freedom fighter from Assam, was the descendant of the Ahom King Gomdhar Konwar who rebelled against British rule.
