= K. Shankar Pillai =

Indian cartoonist

Kesava Shankar Pillai
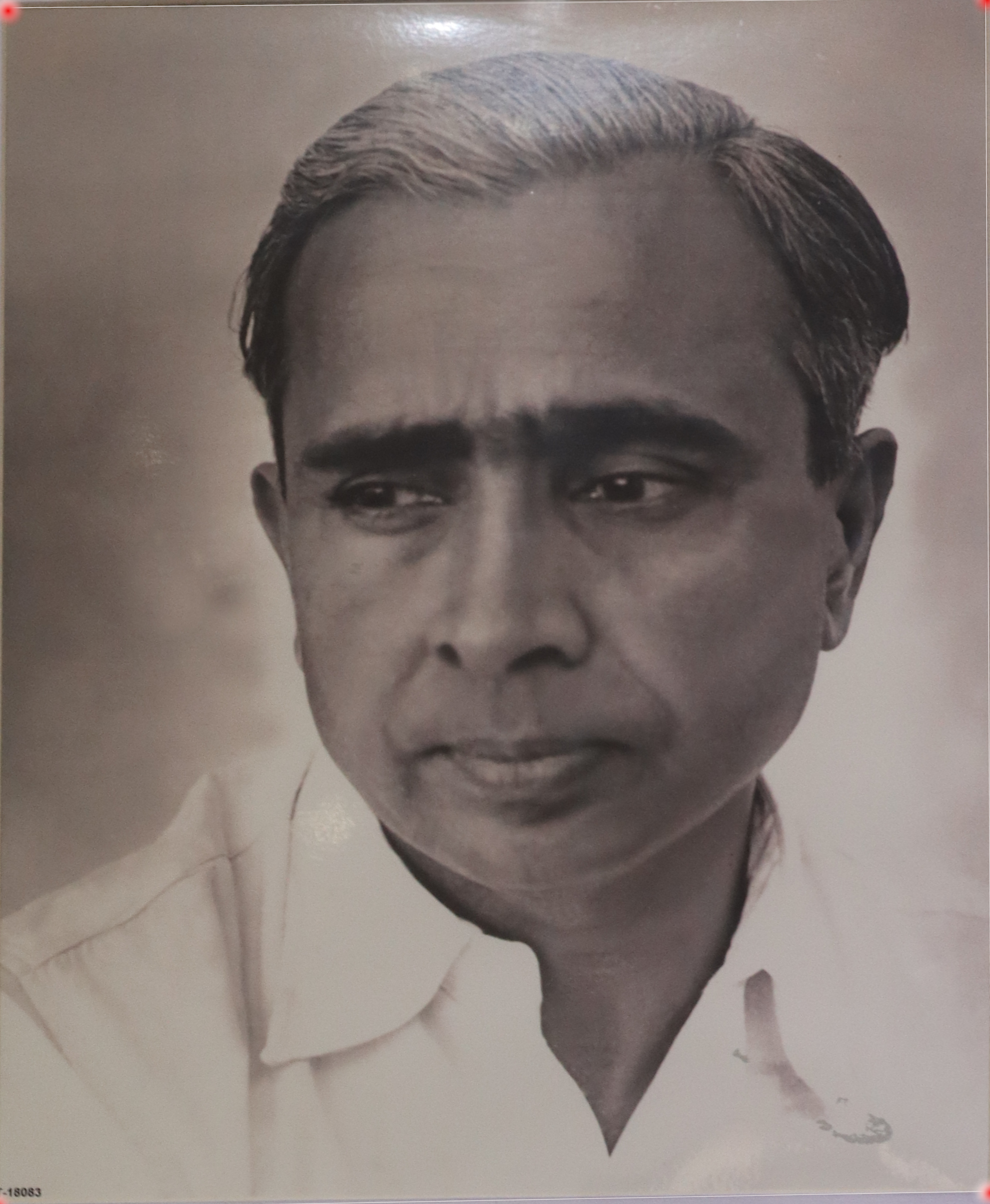
- Born: 31 July 1902; Kayamkulam, British India
- Died: 26 December 1989 (aged 87)
- Education: University Science College, Trivandrum
- Occupations: cartoonist, writer
- Years active: 1932–1986
- Known for: Shankar's Weekly; Children's Book Trust; Shankar's International Dolls Museum
- Awards: Padma Vibhushan (1976)

Kesava Shankar Pillai (31 July 1902 – 26 December 1989), better known as Shankar, was an Indian cartoonist. He is considered the father of political cartooning in India. He founded Shankar's Weekly, India's Punch in 1948. Shankar's Weekly also produced cartoonists like Abu Abraham, Ranga and Kutty, he closed down the magazine during the Emergency of 25 June 1975. From then on he turned to making children laugh and enjoy life.

He was awarded the Padma Vibhushan in 1976, the second highest civilian honour given by the Govt. of India. Today he is most remembered for setting up Children's Book Trust established 1957 and Shankar's International Dolls Museum in 1965.

== Early life and education ==
Shankar was born in 1902 at Kayamkulam, Kerala. He attended schools in Kayamkulam and Mavelikkara. The sleeping posture of one of his teachers in the classroom was his first cartoon which got him into trouble. He was encouraged by his uncle who saw in him a great potential as a cartoonist. After schooling, he studied painting at Ravi Varma School of Painting at Mavelikara (Raja Ravi Varma College of Fine Arts).

Shankar took keen interest in dramas, scouting, literary activities etc. He amazingly did good campaign for the collection of funds towards flood relief. This concern for the poor and the distressed people continued all through his life and reflected in his cartoons.

After graduating from the Maharaja's College of Science (now University College), Trivandrum, in 1927, he left for Bombay (now Mumbai) for higher studies and joined the Law College, but quit his law studies midway and started working.

== Career ==
Shankar's cartoons were published in The Free Press Journal and The Bombay Chronicle. Pothan Joseph, the editor of the Hindustan Times brought him to Delhi as a staff cartoonist, in 1932 and he continued as its staff cartoonist till 1946. Thus he and his family settled in Delhi finally.

Shankar's cartoons attracted even Viceroys like Lord Willington and Lord Linlithgow. Gandhi wrote a postcard to Shankar questioning one of his cartoons on Jinnah. There were other occasions too when Congress leaders disputed Shankar's cartoons. During this time, Shankar had a chance of training in London for about 14 months. He spent the period in various Art schools, using the opportunity to study the advanced techniques in cartooning. He also visited Berlin, Rome, Vienna, Geneva and Paris. When he returned to India, the country was in the thick of freedom struggle. The dawn of independence also favoured Shankar's dreams for a separate periodical. The idea came true when Pandit Jawaharlal Nehru released Shankar's Weekly, edited by Shankar himself. However his cartoon also remained neutral often critical to his work, notable a cartoon published on 17 May 1964, just 10 days before Pandit Nehru death, showed an emaciated and exhausted Pandit Jawaharlal Nehru, with a torch in hand, running the final leg of a race, with party leaders Gulzari Lal Nanda, Lal Bahadur Shastri, Morarji Desai, Krishna Menon and Indira Gandhi in tow, to which Nehru remarked, "Don't spare me, Shankar".

Shankar loved kids and organised Shankar started the Shankar's International Children's Competition in 1949, and as a part of it, the Shankar's On-the-Spot Painting Competition for Children in 1952. He instituted an annual Competition for Writers of Children's Books in 1978. Beginning with English this competition is now held in Hindi too. It later began drawing children from all over the world. Annual awards from Shankar's Weekly were presented by prime ministers.

He also founded the Children's Book Trust in Nehru House on Bahadur Shah Zafar Marg in New Delhi in 1957. Later in 1965, the International Dolls Museum too came to be located here. Thus Nehru House became a 'must visit' item for kids going to New Delhi. It has now a children's library and reading room, known as Dr. B.C. Roy Memorial Children's Library and Reading Room and Library and a Doll development and production centre.

== Personal life ==
The name of Shankar's wife was Thankam. He had two sons and three daughters. The Government of India released two postal stamps in 1991, depicting two of his cartoons. He was a member of Kerala Lalit Kala Academy. He also published an autobiographical work, 'Life with my Grandfather' in 1965, a Children's Book Trust publication.

== Legacy ==
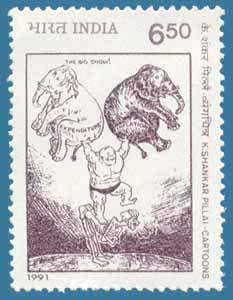
Pillai Cartoon on Indian Postage stamp, 1991

In 2002, 'A Symphony of Dreams', an exhibition to commemorate his birth centenary year, was organised at the Lalit Kala Academy, Delhi. In May 2012, a cartoon of Bhimrao Ambedkar sketched by him in 1949 caused "furor" in Indian Parliament, in reaction to its inclusion in NCERT education material, resulting in resignation of concerned NCERT personnel. Individuals claiming to belong to "Republican Panthers" protested against the cartoon. Shankar Memorial National Cartoon Museum and Art Gallery was established by the Kerala Lalithakala Akademi in 2014, as a tribute to the renowned Indian cartoonist in his hometown.

== Honors and awards ==
- Padma Shri, 1956
- Padma Bhushan, 1966
- Padma Vibhushan, 1976
- Order of the Smile (1977), an honour from a committee of Polish children
- D. Litt. (honoris causa) by the University of Delhi.

== Bibliography ==
- Shankar (1937), 101 Cartoons from the Hindustan Times. Delhi: Printed at the Hindustan Times Press. One hundred and one cartoons from the Hindustan Times; With a foreword by Jawaharlal Nehru.
- Shankar (1965), Life with grandfather. New Delhi, Children's Book Trust. Written and illustrated by Shankar: An orphan Indian boy being raised by his grandparents tells stories about his life.
- Shankar (1983), Don't spare me Shankar: Jawaharlal Nehru. New Delhi: Children's Book Trust. Reproduction of 400 selected cartoons from the Shankar's weekly, 20 June 1948 – 17 May 1964.
- Khanduri. 2014. Caricaturing Culture in India: Cartoons and History of the Modern World. Cambridge: Cambridge University Press. http://www.cambridge.org/us/academic/authors/246935
