= Bahadur Shah Zafar Marg =

Road in Delhi, India

Bahadur Shah Zafar Marg (Hindi: बहादुर शाह ज़फर मार्ग, Urdu: بهادر شاہ ظفر مارگ) is a road in Delhi, India. This road is sometimes also referred to as the (Mountain grass) Fleet Street of India, due to the presence of the newspaper offices of The Times of India, The Economic Times, The Indian Express, The Financial Express, Business Standard, The Pioneer, Metro Now amongst several others.

This road connects ITO Crossing to Daryaganj.

== Institutions and sites on & around this road ==
- Bureau of Indian Standards
- Communist Party of India has its office off Bahadur Shah Zafar Marg
- Comptroller and Auditor General of India
- Arun Jaitley Cricket Stadium
- Feroz Shah Kotla Fort
- Feroz Shah Kotla, Delhi's fifth city, founded as Ferozabad by Feroz Shah
- Jamiat Ulama-e-Hind
- Khooni Darwaza
- Maulana Azad Medical College
- Shankar's International Dolls Museum
- National Herald (Associated Journals)
- Times Group
- Children's Book Trust, Nehru House
- Shankar's International Dolls Museum, Nehru House
- University Grants Commission (India)
- Indian National Science Academy (INAS)
