= Estidama =

Building design methodology

Estidama is a building design methodology for constructing and operating buildings and communities more sustainably. The program is a key aspect of the "Abu Dhabi Vision 2030" drive to build the Abu Dhabi emirate according to innovative green standards. "Estidama" is the Arabic word for sustainability. The program is not itself a green building rating system like LEED or BREEAM, but rather a collection of ideals that are imposed in an elective building code type of format.

Within Estidama, however is a green building rating system called the Pearl Rating System that is utilized to evaluate sustainable building development practices in Abu Dhabi.

The Estidama program is mandatory in Abu Dhabi, United Arab Emirates - all buildings must achieve a minimum 1 Pearl Rating, and all government-funded buildings must achieve a minimum 2 Pearl Rating.
