= Abu Dhabi International Book Fair =

Annual book fair in Abu Dhabi, UAE

Abu Dhabi International Book Fair logo

The Abu Dhabi International Book Fair is an annual book fair held in Abu Dhabi. It provides a platform where publishers, booksellers, agents, cultural organisations and press can meet, exchange ideas and identify business opportunities. Since 2007 it has been organised by KITAB, a joint venture between the Abu Dhabi Authority for Culture and Heritage and the Frankfurt Book Fair.

The ADIBF forms part of KITAB's strategy to transform Abu Dhabi into a major centre in the publishing world. The 2009 fair hosted 637 publishing houses from 52 countries with a record number of visitors, with 200,000 attending over the six days. 2010: 840 exhibitors from 63 countries.

The ADIBF brings together the Arab and International publishing communities. The fair provides access to publishers in the entire MENA region, and as such is an important event in the negotiation and sale of book rights and licensing. In 2009/10 KITAB and ADACH launched the Spotlight on Rights Programme, which awards a subsidy of $1000 towards costs to encourage the negotiation of licenses to and from the Arabic language. The fair also hosts events as part of its ongoing Cultural (KITAB Sofa) and Professional Programme.

== History ==
The fair was first launched in 1981 under the name "Islamic Book Fair" before being renamed the Abu Dhabi International Book Fair (ADIBF) in 1986. Since its inception, the main objectives of the fair have been to encourage reading, foster cultural exchange, and highlight the cultural development within the United Arab Emirates. It also aims to transform Abu Dhabi into a significant hub for the publishing industry in the Arab region.

The ADIBF is held annually, having become a fixed annual event since 1993. In the same year, its venue moved to the Abu Dhabi National Exhibition Centre. The fair brings together leading publishing houses from the UAE and worldwide, alongside libraries, agencies, cultural institutions, and press clubs. The events of the Abu Dhabi Book Fair attract all those interested in cultural circles, regardless of their diverse intellectual backgrounds.

In its 33rd edition, the Abu Dhabi International Book Fair welcomed over 200,000 visitors and featured 1,350 publishing houses from 90 countries.

== Abu Dhabi International Book Fair Awards ==
Ceremonies will be held to honor the winners of the list of awards given within the exhibition, the most prominent of which are:

- Sheikh Zayed Book Award
- International Prize for Arabic Fiction
- Narration of Gold
- Treasure of the Generation
- Asma Siddiq Award for First Novel
- World Book Organization WOW Award
- Ibn Battuta Award for Travel Literature

== 2010 Fair ==
The 2010 fair was the 20th ADIBF from 2 – 7 March at the Abu Dhabi National Exhibition Centre, UAE. 7th IPA Copyright Symposium was hosted by KITAB on the eve of the 2010 fair. The Symposium took place in Abu Dhabi from 28 February to 1 March 2010, before the Abu Dhabi International Book Fair commenced on 2 March. It aimed to “provide a talking shop for representatives of all aspects of the publishing world to discuss issues at the forefront of copyright protection and enforcement globally today.”

Matchmakings for international und Arabic publishing: „Many of them in the USA and in Europe have not realised, how interested the Arabic colleagues are..." (Mark Linz, American University in Cairo Press).

== 2011 Fair ==
22. - 27. March.

== 2022 Fair ==
Abu Dhabi hosted the 31st edition of the Abu Dhabi International Book Fair 2022 for 7 days at ADNEC Exhibition Grounds. The exhibition was organized by the Abu Dhabi Arabic Language Center, affiliated with the Department of Culture and Tourism. After the cultural scene was affected by the pandemic, the new session came with many events and activities and a large group of publishers, numbering 1,130 from more than 80 countries around the world. The exhibition area extended to cover 5 halls between participating publishing houses, 5 programs and 6 corners with the media section. Germany was the “guest of honor” at the exhibition with the participation of 34 publishers and an accompanying cultural program showcasing the most prominent German cultural scenes. The central figure of the exhibition was the Arab writer “Taha Hussein”, as he had a special platform to display his most important writings.

== 2023 Fair ==
The 32nd edition of the Abu Dhabi International Book Fair was held from May 22, 2023, to May 28. There are more than 2,000 diverse events and more than 1,300 exhibitors from 90 countries.

The fair host a number of writers, historians and thinkers, including Tunisian historian and archaeologist Dr. Ibrahim Shabouh, who is interested in verifying the works of Ibn Khaldun, thinker Dr. Ahmed Barqawi, and British writer Anthony Sattin.

The fair will announce the winner of the International Prize for Arabic Fiction and honor the shortlisted candidates in conjunction with the celebration of the 15th anniversary of Abu Dhabi hosting the award.

== 2024 Fair ==
The 33rd edition was held from April 29 to May 4, 2024, organized by the Abu Dhabi Arabic Language Center, with the participation of 1,350 publishers from 90 countries, including 140 publishing houses participating for the first time. The exhibition attracted 231,168 visitors, with 160,152 books sold.

This edition celebrated the Arab Republic of Egypt as the guest of honor, and the Egyptian novelist Naguib Mahfouz as the "Pivotal Figure" of 2024 through a series of seminars, with the participation of intellectuals and researchers from Egypt and the Arab world, who discussed his human and creative experience.

The fair featured five main programs, with a new addition this year: the "World Book" focus. This new segment highlights a literary work that has significantly impacted global literature, with its influence spanning across years and cultures. It debuted with Kalīlah wa-Dimnah by Abdullah ibn al-Muqaffaʿ. This initiative was coordinated with an art exhibition organized by the Louvre Abu Dhabi, titled "Fables from Kalīlah wa-Dimnah to La Fontaine," which ran concurrently with the fair.

== See also ==
- Abu Dhabi Authority for Culture & Heritage
- Frankfurt Book Fair
- Sharjah International Book Fair
