= Karachi International Book Fair =

Annual book fair held in Karachi, Pakistan

- Status: Active
- Genre: Multi-genre
- Venue: Karachi
- Location: Expo Centre
- Country: Pakistan
- Inaugurated: 2005
- Website: http://www.kibf.com.pk

The Karachi International Book Fair (KIBF) is an annual book fair held in Karachi, Pakistan, since 2005, organised by the Pakistan Publishers and Booksellers Association. It is the largest book fair and trade show in the country. It is a platform for domestic and international publishers, booksellers, agents, cultural organisations, and the press to exhibit their work and identify business opportunities.

It is held annually at the Karachi Expo Centre grounds in Karachi. It is usually held in December (with the exception of 2015). The fair was not held in 2020 due to COVID-19 lockdown restrictions.
