= Abu Dhabi Department of Culture and Tourism =

Agency of the Government of Abu Dhabi

- دائرة الثقافة والسياحة

Department overview
- Formed: 2 October 2012
- Preceding agencies: Abu Dhabi Tourism Authority; Abu Dhabi Authority for Culture and Heritage
- Jurisdiction: Emirate of Abu Dhabi
- Website: dct.gov.ae

The Abu Dhabi Department of Culture and Tourism (Arabic: دائرة الثقافة والسياحة) is an agency of the Government of Abu Dhabi established in February 2012 by Sheikh Khalifa bin Zayed Al Nahyan, then president of the United Arab Emirates and ruler of Abu Dhabi, to replace Abu Dhabi's two main tourism and culture agencies, the Abu Dhabi Tourism Authority and the Abu Dhabi Authority for Culture and Heritage.

== About ==
The new authority's objective is to preserve and manage the art and cultural heritage of the emirate and develop tourism and museum projects such as Zayed National Museum, Guggenheim Abu Dhabi, Natural History Museum Abu Dhabi and Louvre Abu Dhabi Museums.

In September 2017, Sheikh Khalifa issued a decree to reshape the Executive Council of Abu Dhabi, which included renaming the Abu Dhabi Tourism and Culture Authority as the Department of Culture and Tourism.

== Merger ==
The authority results from a merger between three organizations: Abu Dhabi Authority for Culture and Heritage, an institution which was responsible for the preservation of cultural heritage; the Abu Dhabi Tourism Authority; and the cultural department of Tourism Development & Investment Company (TDIC), one of the private developers of cultural tourism in the emirate. The merger was ordered by executive council and Sultan bin Tahnoon Al Nahyan was appointed as chairman to oversee the emergence of the new authority leveraging his experience as chairman of former TDIC's Cultural Department.

Abu Dhabi Gaming was later integrated into Abu Dhabi Department of Culture and Tourism to develop gaming and esports industries: this integration was undertaken in November 2023.

== See also ==
- Abu Dhabi Art
- Cultural policy in Abu Dhabi
- List of tourist attractions in the United Arab Emirates
