= Children's Book Trust =

Indian publishing house

- Abbreviation: CBT
- Formation: 1957
- Headquarters: Nehru House, 4 Bahadur Shah Zafar Marg, New Delhi - 2
- Website: Official website

Children's Book Trust (CBT) is an Indian children and young adult book publisher. It was founded by cartoonist K. Shankar Pillai, popularly known as Shankar, in 1957 and was inaugurated by the President of India Dr. S. Radhakrishnan. It is housed in Nehru House along with the Shankar's International Dolls Museum. Today, CBT comprises the Shankar's International Dolls Museum, the Dolls Designing and Production Center, Dr. B.C. Roy Memorial Children's Library and Reading Room and Library, and the Indraprastha Press.

== History ==
Initially Shankar was the only story writer published by CBT but soon expanded to include others. CBT brought out its first set of illustrated books in 1961: Kings Choice (English) written by K. Shiv Kumar and illustrated by Reboti Bhushan, and Varsha Ki Boond (Hindi) by Kusmawati Deshpande and illustrated by K. K. Hebbar. Its first picture book Home (English) written by Kamla Nair and illustrated by K.S. Kulkarni was published in 1965. The first picture book for pre-school children Three Fish written by Dolat Doongaji and A.K.Lavangia, and illustrated by Pulak Biswas was published in 1966.

In 1978, CBT started an annual Competition for Writers of Children's Books, and today most of its publishing is sourced from the winning entries. Its books are printed at its own 'Indraprastha Press', and sent out to international book fairs through the National Book Trust and its network of 1500 distributors.
