= Abu Dhabi Authority for Culture & Heritage =

Abu Dhabi Authority for Culture and Heritage
Agency overview
- Formed: 4 October 2005
- Dissolved: 2 October 2012
- Superseding agency: Abu Dhabi Department of Culture and Tourism
- Jurisdiction: Emirate of Abu Dhabi
- Website: www.abudhabitourism.ae

The Abu Dhabi Authority for Culture and Heritage (known colloquially as the ADACH) was a statutory body in the United Arab Emirates that administered cultural heritage in the Emirate of Abu Dhabi. In 2012, it merged into the Abu Dhabi Tourism and Culture Authority.

== History ==
The ADACH was founded on 4 October 2005 by local decree (Law 28/2005), in order to be the Abu Dhabi's solitary governing body for cultural heritage protection. Both the Historic Buildings Division and the Archaeology Division were governed by the ADACH. The organization's headquarters was located in one of the oldest cultural heritage buildings in the city, near the Qasr al-Hosn. It had a theater, amphitheater, and gallery.

=== Initiatives ===
It organized the representation of UAE at the 53rd Venice Biennale in 2009. ADACH also organized arts events in Abu Dhabi. They partnered with British Council in 2010 to present dancer Akram Khan. That same year, ADACH partnered with the Western Region Development Council, the Union Defence Force, and the UAE Civil Services Department to offer scholarships to people interested in knowledge-based economies. As of 2010, the organization was suffering from "organizational and financial problems."

In 2011 it launched a preservation project to inventory and research the cultural heritage and life of those living in the region prior to modernization in the 1960s. ADACH also started a GIS database for cultural heritage sites. It also maintained a historic preservation program for historic buildings in rural areas of the country. The organization also hosted the first WOMAD festival in the Middle East. It also held the first Abu Dhabi International Book Fair and Abu Dhabi Film Festivals. It founded the Al Qattara Arts Center.

In February 2012, ADACH announced the creation of an extension location of the Al Ain National Museum and the preservation of the Hili Archaeological Park in Al Ain. The project aimed to show the cultural history of Al Ain outside the central city, and closer to the oasis' borders. The preservation of the park, included an interpretive center about the people and history of the site.

=== Merger and status today ===
The Abu Dhabi Tourism and Culture Authority was established and the ADACH was merged into it, in February 2012. The ordered by Khalifa bin Zayed Al Nahyan, with the goal of having one organization govern all aspects of tourism.

Upon merger, the WOMAD and Sounds of Arabia festivals, along with the Abu Dhabi Classics concerts were canceled. The organization's name is still representing the Abu Dhabi International Book Fair and the Beit Al Oud Arabic Music Academy. The organization was a partner with the World Digital Library, and their content continues to be represented via the website. It was a partner with the New York Film Academy, which continues today.

== Collections ==
Collections included the photography collection of Edward "Tug" Wilson.

== See also ==
- Sheikh Zayed Palace Museum
