= Jagadish Chandra Bose: The Reluctant Scientist =

2023 book by Sudipto Das

Jagadish Chandra Bose: The Reluctant Physicist (ISBN 978-93-89136-99-9) is a contemporary biography of the Indian polymath Sir Jagadish Chandra Bose, a pioneer of radio science who is sometimes considered the father of plant neurobiology, by Indian author Sudipto Das. The book is Das's debut in non-fiction after three novels. It was published in November 2023 by Niyogi Books and launched in Bangalore at the Bangalore Literature Festival on December 3, 2023, and in Calcutta on January 11, 2024.

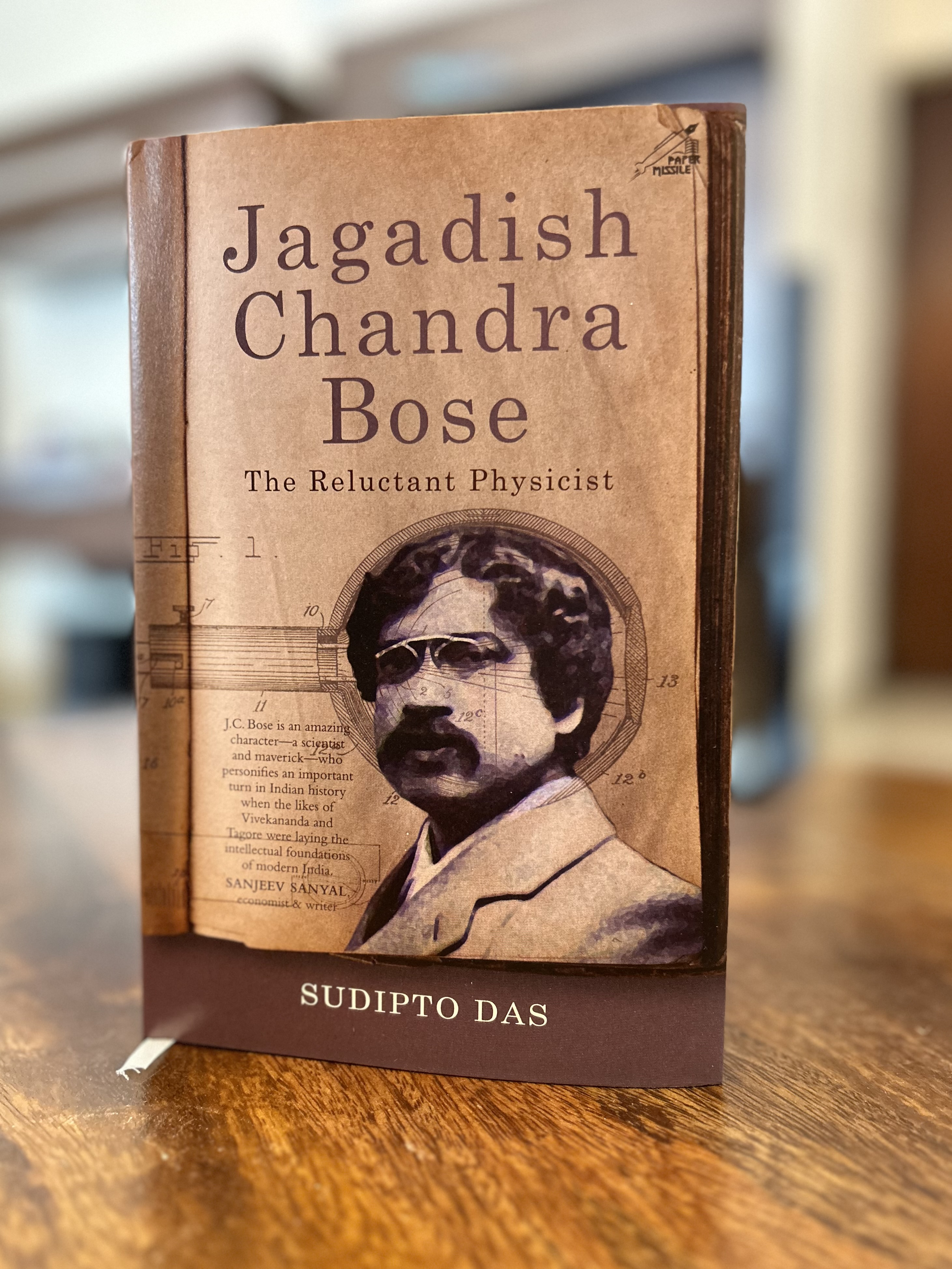
Cover of Jagadish Chandra Bose: The Reluctant Physicist

The book poignantly chronicles Bose's championing of India’s self-reliance through scientific research despite British racism and prejudice against Indian science. Bose designed innovative instruments for his experiments, prioritising open sharing over patents, and in the process becoming a forerunner of today’s open innovation. Already a poster boy of the India Semiconductor Mission and hailed as a trailblazer in the technology that was a precursor to semiconductors, Bose’s depiction in the book resonates well with the government’s emphasis on self-reliance in the Science, Technology, and Innovation (STI) ecosystems in the country.

== Author ==
Sudipto Das is an IIT Kharagpur alumnus and a veteran in the semiconductor industry, as well as an entrepreneur, musician, social worker, columnist, and speaker at TED events. Born in Calcutta in 1973 to a family that fled Bangladesh during the partition riots of 1947, Sudipto grew up listening to horrid stories of the partition, something he extensively used later in his debut novel, The Ekkos Clan, published in 2013. A violinist trained in Western classical music, Sudipto debuted as a music composer in 2014 when he recreated Eastern European melodies of the 1940s for the war musical Schweyk in the Second World War by Bertolt Brecht.

== Summary ==
Sir J. C. Bose defied norms in science and life. A co-inventor of radio technologies and a pioneer in semiconductors and wireless communication. Das's book delves into Bose's remarkable life, intertwined with India's struggle for freedom, and explores his complex relationships, especially with Sister Nivedita and Sara Chapman Bull, which defied easy definition.

=== Narrative ===
Praised for its captivating narrative, the book transcends the boundaries of a conventional scientific chronicle by exploring India’s socio-political milieu. The poetic eloquence that makes the book read more like a novelistic story bridges the gap between science writing and a broader readership.

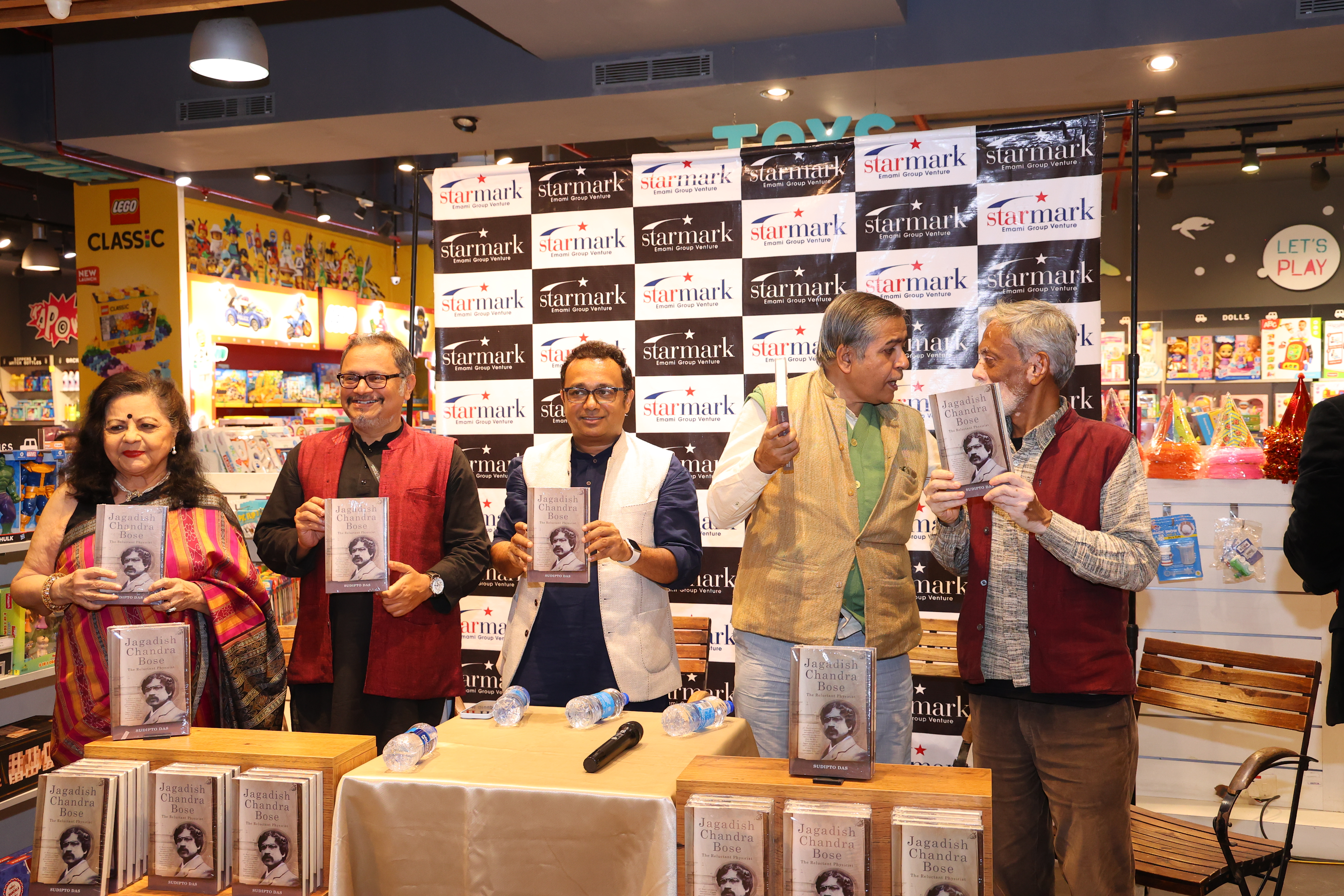
Calcutta launch of The Reluctant Physicist

=== Historical context ===
Bose lived during the high noon of the British Empire, a defining time for great science and innovation, yet major European powers battled for global dominance and hurtled unwittingly towards devastating wars. Bose’s story unfurls against this backdrop and the rising ferment of Indian nationalism. On the one hand, we see glimpses of a young Rabindranath Tagore leading the first non-violent mass resistance against the imperial decree of partitioning Bengal, and, on the other hand, the enigmatic figure of Sister Nivedita, aka Margaret Noble, an Irish-Scottish social activist who, inspired by the firebrand monk Swami Vivekananda, converts to the cause of Hindu nationalism and sparks an armed revolution against British rule. At the same time, Nivedita is liaising with the Unitarian and pacifist Bose, often acting as his scientific secretary and editing his papers.

The book explores this odd partnership of very antipodal characters, collaborating and influencing each other in unseeming ways, not always in mutual agreement, yet in ways that, nevertheless, transcend their differences in a grand and unified vision to make India independent and self-reliant. The book contextualises Bose’s life within the broader canvas of India’s struggle for independence.

=== Spirituality ===
The book is divided into four parts, each exploring the theme of unity.

Bose belonged to the Unitarian Brahmo fraternity, like Rabindranath Tagore, Raja Rammohan Roy, and other eminent Bengalis. Brahmoism was founded on the principles of Advaita Vedanta, the genesis of which is in these words from a verse in the Rig Veda: "Ekam sat, vipra vahudha vadanti”, there exists only One, the wise call it variously. Das gives vivid records of how, driven by this idea of universal unity, Bose explored similarities in plant and human life. He even predicted plant sentience, paving the way for plant neurobiology and cognition.

=== "Boseian" Myth ===
Das delves deep into the controversy surrounding the invention of radio or wireless, which, for a very long time, was attributed solely to the genius of Italian inventor Guglielmo Marconi. The Institute of Electrical and Electronics Engineers (IEEE) has formally acknowledged that Bose is the father of wireless communication with millimetre-waves, used again in 5G. It is his work, done in the late 19th century, that forms the foundation of technologies that power devices ranging from cellphones to microwave ovens, radios to radar, satellite television to the world’s most powerful space telescopes.

=== Role in Bengal Renaissance ===
At a lit-fest, Das highlighted that Jagadish Bose embodied the pinnacle of Bengal Renaissance, championing India's scientific revival and putting it on par with Western science. Culturally, the book suggests, Bose collaborated with Sister Nivedita in resurrecting ancient Indian art, organising the first Ajanta painting exhibition at his home.

== Reception ==
Times of India journalist, Jug Suraiya said:

“An insightful and illuminating exploration of the life and thought of one of the greatest scientific minds that India has ever produced,”

Economist and writer Sanjeev Sanyal said:

“Truly delighted that Sudipto has resurrected an amazing character—a scientist and maverick—who personifies an important turn in Indian history when the likes of Vivekananda and Tagore were laying the intellectual foundations of modern India,”.

“[The] book on Jagadish Chandra Bose looks beyond his scientific contribution, providing a vivid portraiture of the legend’s life. Jagadish Bose comes alive in flesh and blood. [...] Reads like a novel,” reported The Times of India. "More interesting was [Bose’s] personal relationship with Rabindranath Tagore and Sister Nivedita, and how he helped resurrect literature and art while simultaneously indulging in science during the Bengal Renaissance,” reported The Telegraph (Calcutta).

[Getting] under the skin of the person... naturally brought out [Bose's] multiple facades, from a hunter chasing tigers in the Terai jungles to sculling in the freezing waters of the Cam River in Cambridge, [from] writing the first Himalayan travelogue in any language, [to] influencing Tagore to write poems inspired by stories of love and sacrifice from Indian history and mythologies, or even surreptitiously keeping quiet when, he perhaps knew, lab aides planted by Sister Nivedita in Presidency College were regularly taking out explosive materials from the laboratory to make bombs,” Das informed in a conversation with The Hindu. “In the riveting biography,... readers are treated to a comprehensive exploration of the life and times of a man who stood at the crossroads of science, philosophy, and India’s history,... favoured and disfavoured by the English, loved and hated by his peers, and mythified and forgotten by his compatriots. The scientist emerges as a contronym, a figure whose identity is paradoxical and enigmatic," observed the Deccan Herald in a critique.

"Bose, much before Gandhi, had his own moment of ‘Satyagraha,’” said the Press Trust of India. “The book’s true worth lies in its exposition of Bose’s ‘inner life’," commented the Business Standard in a review of the book. “Sudipto Das bridges the gap between science writing and a broader readership to provide a very accessible story about one of the greatest sons of our nation," said the Firstpost. "Sir JC Bose is being resurrected, [...] book after book," observed The Tribune. "When the British found the idea of Indians engaging in science unacceptable, Bose stood firm, advocating that both Indian and Western science should progress together," said the Bangladeshi newspaper Daily Sun. "Das digs deep into Bose’s life to demystify the 'Boseian' myth," reported financialsamachar.com.

Scroll.in published an excerpt from the book with the title, "From the biography: When Jagadish Chandra Bose’s father put his young son under an ex-pirate’s care." ThePrint published another excerpt with the comment, "Sudipto... delves into the life of a reluctant, forgotten physicist." It had an ambiguous title, though: "JC Bose didn’t invent the radio. But Bengalis think he did, way before Marconi."

Some readers have critiqued factual liberties in the book in the form of creative licence, and some academics have criticized a dearth of scientific references.
