= The Broken Amoretti =

Novel by Sudipto Das and Aparajita Dutta

First edition

The Broken Amoretti (ISBN 9789386906830) is a literary novel written by Sudipto Das and Aparajita Dutta. It's the third novel by Sudipto, published by Niyogi Books and formally released at an event in IIT Kharagpur in July 2019.

The novel deals with a number of unconventional and apparently unnatural relationships. It pans across two generations, across two different cultures and societies, while the world awakens and matures to deal with such tabooed relationships in humane ways.

Set against the backdrop of IIT Kharagpur, popularly known as KGP, its surroundings and the "life" that goes around it, the novel delves "deep into the many fascinating and unique aspects of the KGP ethos, culture and traditions. It's the story of an unprecedented pursuit of identities, overcoming societal norms and taboos, and realizing the true essence of relationships that can't be chained by stereotypes".

== Authors ==
The author of three novels, Sudipto is an alumnus of IIT Kharagpur. A columnist, musician, speaker at TEDx events and a successful entrepreneur, having co-founded two startups in the recent past, Sudipto currently serves as the General Secretary of the Sarathi Socio Cultural Trust, which has been successfully involved in various socio-cultural activities in Bangalore for fifteen years. Trained in Western Classical Music, Sudipto is a founding member of the band Kohal, and a composer too.

Co-author of The Broken Amoretti and an contributor author of two anthologies, Aparajita is a social activist. An M.Phil in Comparative Literature from Jadavpur University, she is currently pursuing her PhD from Louisiana State University.

== Plot ==
The novel is a retelling, in flashback, of the story of the topsy-turvy life of Parush, and his obsessive love for Bitasta, the daughter of Panchali, a very close friend of his mother. Sairandhri, his mother, vehemently opposes his relationship with Bitasta and forces her to suddenly breakup with him. Subsequently, Parush’s life is on the path of self-destruction.

The story is narrated through the voice of Saoli, who, after a spate of broken relationships and a dysfunctional marriage, has recently returned to India and is trying to come in terms with her sexual inclination and preferences. Set against the backdrop of IIT Kharagpur and a nondescript place called Prembajar, adjoining the IIT campus, the novel is apparently a story of self destructive and unrequited love. But, the undercurrent is the various tabooed and unconventional relationships which have been brushed under the carpet since ages. Both threads run concurrently without upsetting the rhythm of the other, finally revealing many unsettling truths about the main protagonists through a cryptic poem written in dactylic hexameter, the ancient Homeric meter of the Greek mythologies. Incidentally, classical and ancient poetry and meters play important roles in novel, which uses them very efficiently as props. The name "The Broken Amoretti" derives from Spenser's 16th century epic poem Amoretti.

The authors have clarified that the novel, although set against the backdrop of a college, is universal enough to alleviate it from being yet another glossy, candy-floss college romcom story.

=== Chronology ===
Many of the characters in The Broken Amoretti also appear in Sudipto's previous novels, The Ekkos Clan and The Aryabhata Clan. There's an unbroken continuity of the chronology of the various key events across all the three novels, but The Broken Amoretti, like the other two, stands as an independent and complete story. Chronologically, The Broken Amoretti falls in between the timelines of The Ekkos Clan and The Aryabhata Clan.

== Reviews ==
1. "An unusually bold narrative... Almost lyrical in nature," said the Times of India about The Broken Amoretti.
2. "Story of an unprecedented pursuit of identities...," said an official post by IIT Kharagpur.
3. "The Broken Amoretti blends mystery and adventure to break stereotypes and talk about taboo topics," said The Asian Age in a feature.
4. "A quirky, valiant, and goose bumps-raising queer love story," commented Deccan Chronicle.
5. "An intriguing love story... Reflection of relationships today," said Eastern Chronicle.
6. "Captivating tale of highs and lows," said The Statesman.
7. "Romance, romanticisation, mystery, pathos - The Broken Amoretti has it all," observed The New Indian Express in its review.

=== Criticism ===
Few from the queer fraternity have termed the book a failure as a queer novel, "unable to embrace lesbian love and look it in the eye."
