= Animation industry in India =

Separated field for animation films

The Indian Animation Industry encompasses traditional 2D animation, 3D animation and visual effects for feature films. In 1956, Disney Studios animator Clair Weeks, who had worked on Bambi, was invited to Films Division of India in Mumbai to establish and train the country's first animation studio as part of the American technical co-operation mission. He trained a core group of Indian animators, whose first production was a film called The Banyan Deer (1957). Veteran animator Ram Mohan started his career at Films Division's Cartoon Unit.

Another landmark animated film from Films Division is Ek Anek Aur Ekta, a short traditionally animated educational film released in 1974. The film is presented as a fable meant to teach children the value of unity, and was frequently broadcast on India's state-run television station, Doordarshan. The first Indian animated television series was Ghayab Aaya, which aired in 1986 and was directed by Suddhasattwa Basu. The first Indian 3D and VFX were done for the television series Captain Vyom by animation.

The first Indian 3D animated film was Roadside Romeo, a joint venture between Yash Raj Films and the Indian division of the Walt Disney Company. It was written and directed by Jugal Hansraj.

== History ==
The history of animation in India can be traced to the early 20th century. Precursors to modern animation such as shadow puppets and slide shows entertained audiences before the advent of the cinema. Pioneers such as Dadasaheb Phalke, Gunamoy Banerjee, K.S. Gupte and G.K. Ghokle kept the tradition of animation alive during the first half of the 20th century. Such individuals were usually self-taught and were inspired by foreign cartoons.

=== Pre-Independence ===
Even before the birth of animation, shadow-puppet traditions used images to tell stories. A notable example is tholu bommalata ("the dance of the leather puppets") from the state of Andhra Pradesh. The puppets used were large, had multiple joints, and were coloured on both sides. This meant that coloured shadows were projected onto the screen. Performances were accompanied by music. Folk tales and various epics such as the Mahabharata and Ramayana were dramatized.

The Shambharik Kharolika was another means of entertainment that pre-dated the age of cinema. A series of hand-painted glass slides were projected using an apparatus called the "magic lantern". Mahadeo Gopal Patwardhan and his sons were responsible for popularising the medium across parts of India in the late 19th century. Patwardhan initially took it up as a hobby after being inspired by his friend Madan Madhav Rao Vitale, who was an engineer. Eventually, elements such as dialogue, narration, lyrics and background music were added. The first public show was held on 20 February 1892 in Kalyan, Mumbai. The first grand tour ended on 27 December 1895 at the 11th session of the Indian National Congress in Pune. The slides depicted various tales from the Ramayana, Sita Swayamvar, Mahabharata, Sati Anasuya, Raja Harishchandra, Shekhar Dashratha, and the circus. The circus slides were sponsored by the proprietors of the Chhatre's Grand Circus. Works by painters Raja Ravi Verma and Madhavrao Dhurandhar were also recreated.

It is said that Raja Harishchandra's story in the form of an animated slide show was an influence behind prolific filmmaker Dadasaheb Phalke's first movie Raja Harishchandra, produced in 1913. Raja Harishchandra is notable for being India's first indigenous silent feature film.

Often referred to as the father of Indian cinema, Phalke dabbled in animation as well. His 1912 short The Growth of a Pea Plant introduced the concept of time-lapse photography, with one frame shot per day. In 1915 he produced the animated short Agkadyanchi Mouj (Matchsticks' Fun). He had probably been inspired by Émile Cohl’s matchstick film. This was followed by Laxmicha Galicha (animated coins), and Vichitra Shilpa (inanimate animation). Phalke was forced into making shorter works such as cartoons and documentaries since the war in Europe had slowed imports, including film. Unfortunately, animated works such as Agkadyanchi Mouj and Vichitra Shilpa have not survived the ravages of time. However, Phalke’s craftsmanship can still be seen in the title sequence of his last silent film, Setu Bandhan, made in 1932.

In 1934, the first Indian animated film with a soundtrack, On a Moonlit Night, was released. The film is often credited to composer and orchestra leader R.C. Boral, but this attribution may be erroneous.

The Pea Brothers, directed by Gunamoy Banerjee and produced by New Theatres Limited, was released in Calcutta on 23 June 1934, making it the first Indian animated work to be released in theatres. The film was between 3 and 4 minutes long and used drawn black and white images. The plot consists of a pea-pod that opens up to release 5 peas, and from these peas emerge five small toy-like figures that play with one another. The film was basically an experimental attempt and hence lacked a proper storyline. It resembled the tradition of Disney and other foreign animators, whose films were released quite often in Calcutta.

Pune-based Prabhat Film Company's Jambu Kaka was released in Bombay on 15 November 1934. The short features a jackal and was animated by Raghunath K. Kelkar. Around the same time, K.S. Gupte and G.K. Gokhle were teaching themselves animation by watching American cartoons. Their first experiment in animation was called Shikaar ("The Hunt").

Other shorts from the period include Bakam Bhatt by Kolapur Cinetoons, Lafanga Langoor (1935) by Mohan Bhavani, Superman's Myth (1939) by G.K. Ghokhle, and Akash Pataal (1939) by Mandar Malik.

The shortage of raw film stock due to the Second World War may have caused filmmakers to choose animation as a medium.

=== Modern day ===
From the early 2000s into the 2010s, many Indian cartoon channels started producing their own animated shows instead of completely being dependent on American and Japanese animated shows.

For example, the Indian-produced series Chhota Bheem is not only famous in India but is also aired in Sri Lanka and Pakistan.

== Awards and festivals ==
Awards and conventions for the Indian animation industry include:

- National Film Award for Best Non-Feature Animation Film
- National Film Award for Best Animated Film
- Animation Masters Summit, Toonz India Ltd, Trivandrum
- 24FPS Animation Awards, organized by Maya Academy of Advanced Cinematics (MAAC)
- TASI Viewers Choice Awards (TVCA)
- Anifest India
- Annual Graphics and Animation Film Awards (AGAFA) from the Society for Animation in Delhi (SAID) [Not Functioning Anymore]
- Orbit Live and Kalakari, organised by Arena Animation
- Flying Elephant Trophies

== Societies and organizations ==
Confederation of Indian Industry (CII) framed The National AVGC Policy to help Transform Indian M&E to a US$100 billion Industry.

The Animation Society of India (TASI) is a non-profit organization with its head office in Mumbai. It hosts Anifest India, the biggest annual animation festival in the Indian subcontinent.

ASIFA (Association Internationale du Film d’Animation) is UNESCO supported nonprofit organization doing CG Meet up & International Animation day celebrations each year.

The ABAI (Association of Bangalore Animation Industry), with its head office in Bangalore, focuses on the AVGC markets (Animation, Visual Effects, Gaming and Comics).

The Society for Animation in Delhi (SAID) is a non-profit body for animation and related arts. It has now been closed.

Media & Entertainment Association of India (MEAI) is an active body promoting the Indian AVGC industry. MEAI is also noticeable for high-powered delegations to international markets and festivals.

MESC, Media & Entertainment Skills Council by FICCI is working with NSDC to promote Indian animation, VFX, and other skills.

== Industry ==
The Indian animation industry is being tapped largely by North American film and television producers. There are many reasons behind this increasing demand for Indian studios worldwide. The North American and European countries, from the beginning, show immense readiness to outsource their animation content to companies based in the Asian and Pacific Rim countries. The bulk of the animation in the earlier years included 2D animation content, along with 3D content. But now, the scenario has changed a lot. When compared to the past, the Indian animation industry has gained its foothold in the international space by investing more in technology, moulding eminent artists and developing better infrastructure in film-making. Currently, there are numerous animation studios, VFX, game development, and film-making institutes providing several high-end educational programmes all over India. Students are also interested in overseas education because of the increasing opportunities and decent pay scale.

Japanese animation and production houses have expressed their interest in an alliance in India for the co-production of animated content.

Mumbai, Chennai, Trivandrum, Pune, Hyderabad, Kolkata and Bangalore are major hubs for animation studios in the country.

== List of noted Indian animated films ==
Since The Banyan Deer was released in 1957, over 130 animated movies have been produced in India.

== See also ==
- Animation industry
