= Sudipto Das =

Indian author and entrepreneur

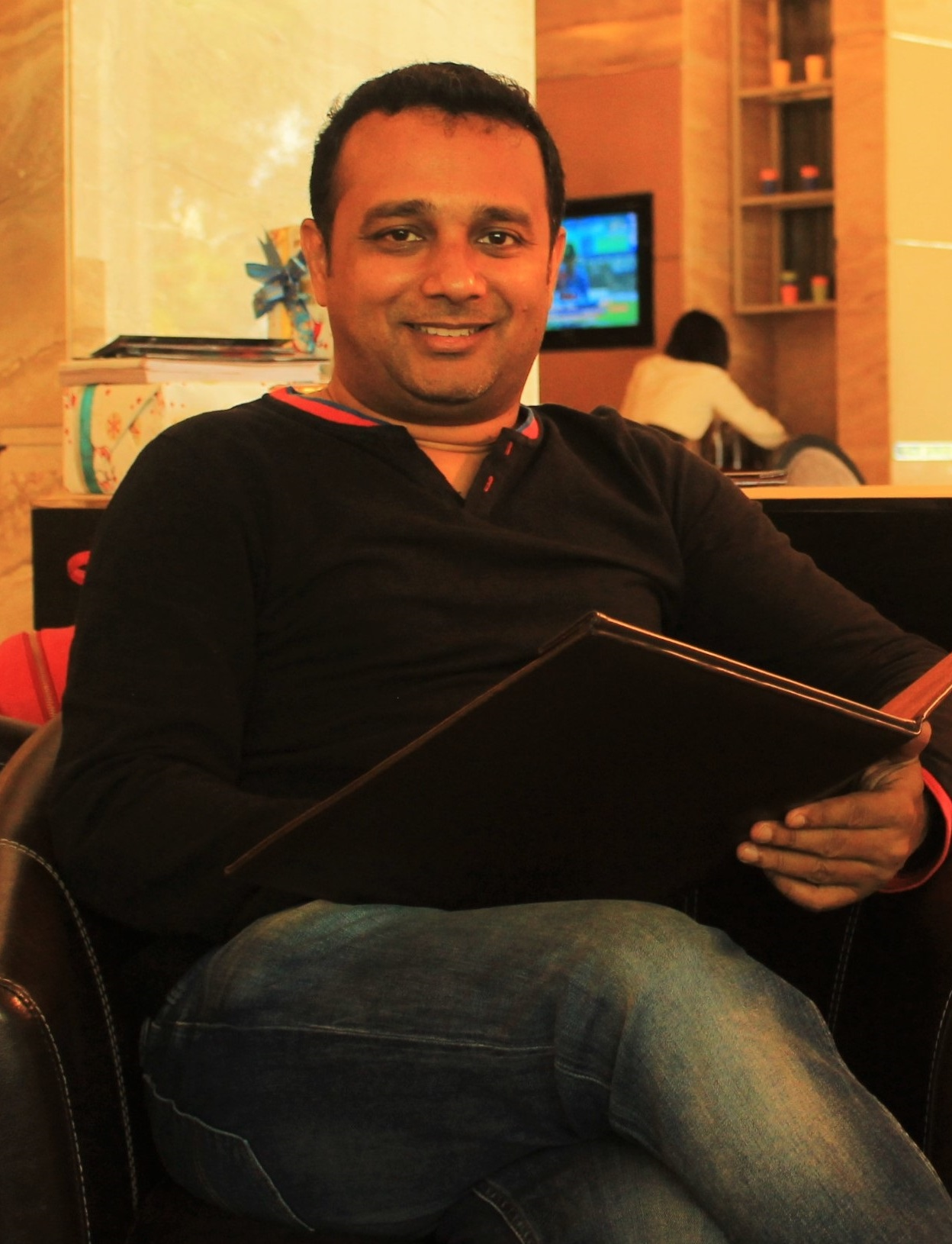
- Sudipto Das in 2017
- Born: 12 July 1973 (age 53)
- Education: IIT Kharagpur
- Occupations: Author, Musician, Columnist, Entrepreneur
- Writing career
- Notable works: Novels The Ekkos Clan, The Aryabhata Clan, The Broken Amoretti; Biography Jagadish Chandra Bose - The Reluctant Physicist; Music of Schweyk in the Second World War, Blooming Orchard
- Website: www.sudiptodas.com

Sudipto Das (born 12 July 1973) is an Indian author, social worker and musician. He is also a speaker at TED events and a veteran in the semiconductor industry, having co-chaired the Industry Forum at VLSID 2020. He has been the co-founder of two startups. In 2020 he spearheaded a country wide initiative to deliver daily groceries to people stranded due to lockdowns in the wake of the breakout of COVID-19.

Das has written three novels—The Ekkos Clan (2013), The Aryabhata Clan (2018) and The Broken Amoretti (2019) - and a biography, Jagadish Chandra Bose: The Reluctant Physicist (2023). He has also published the coffee table book Myths & Truths Behind The Ekkos Clan (2014). Within a fortnight of its release The Ekkos Clan reached third place in the best seller list in Flipkart in the Literature and Fiction section.

Sudipto, an alumnus of IIT Kharagpur, has been a secretary at the Sarathi Socio Cultural Trust for many years, looking after their cultural initiatives in Bangalore. He also served as the General Secretary of Sarathi.

== Early days ==
Sudipto was born in Calcutta to a family which fled Bangladesh during the partition riots of 1947.

== Music ==
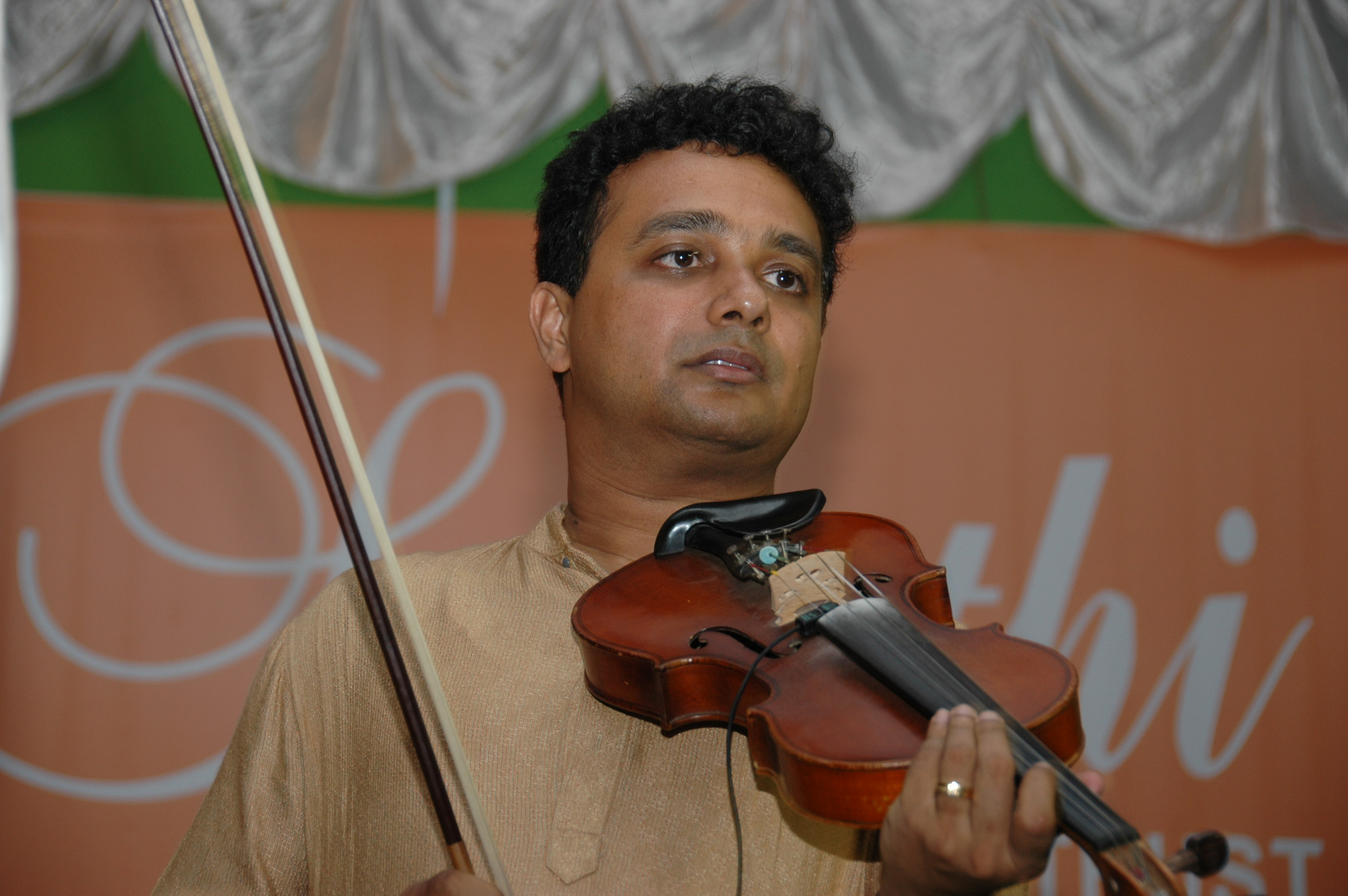
Sudipto performing in Kohal, 2008

Sudipto started the music band Kohal in Bangalore in 2007 with some of the members of ETMS.

In May 2014 he tried his hand at creating background scores for a play, directed by Sharmin Ali, where he used only Mozart's compositions for the entire score. In the same year, he composed original scores recreating the Balkan music of the 1940s for a Forum Three musical, an adaptation of Schweyk in the Second World War by Bertolt Brecht, which was staged many times in Bangalore and once in Auroville for an international audience.

In 2018 he composed the theme music of Blooming Orchard, the English adaptation of Manoj Mitra's Bengali play Sajano Bagan.

Kohal have performed some of Sudipto's original compositions in their shows.

== Entrepreneurship ==
Sudipto played key roles in creating three startups in VLSI Design Services in the past ten years. In June 2017 he co-founded a company, which was adjudged one of the Top 10 most disruptive and potentially game-changing startups in the electrical and electronics sector by the "ELECRAMA Startup Awards 2018", for its AI enabled IoT based Smart Lighting solution.

== Novels ==
=== The Ekkos Clan ===
Das began working on his first novel, The Ekkos Clan, in 2008, and it was launched in Bangalore on August 3, 2013. A contemporary mystery novel set against the backdrop of ancient Indian history and delving deep into the behind-the-scenes stories of the Rig Veda, the oldest book of mankind, the book deals extensively with linguistic palaeontology, Astronomy, Archaeology, music, and poetry.

The Ekkos Clan is one of very few literary works in any Indian language to have touched based on the horrors of the Bengal side of the Indian Partition. Sudipto talked about his research into the Bengal Partition and its sparse representation in Indian literature at a panel on Borderland Narratives of the Bengal Partition, held at the UIUC in April 2019.

Another book, The Myths & Truths Behind The Ekkos Clan, is a compilation of historical and linguistic facts and figures which loosely form the background of Sudipto Das' debut novel, The Ekkos Clan. Das presents a series of discoveries and theories, espoused by a particular school of historians and linguists, which are used as the historical background in the novel.

=== The Aryabhata Clan ===
Das plans a trilogy with Afsar-Kratu-Tista and linguistic palaeontology. In The Aryabhata Clan, the sequel to The Ekkos Clan, he uses a verse composed by the Indian mathematician Aryabhata to decipher a riddle which lies at the center of a mysterious and sinister plan to create an apocalypse in India. The Aryabhata Clan was released in December 2017.

=== The Broken Amoretti ===
In various interviews, given between September and December 2013, Sudipto mentioned that he had already completed the first draft of a book, Prembajar (working title), which wouldn't be a sequel of The Ekkos Clan. "My yearning to make my alma mater IIT Kharagpur (KGP) a part of my literary creation is so strong that I want to write a KGP trilogy too, a set of three unusual love stories, all originating in KGP," he said. Later, Prembajar was rechristened The Broken Amoretti, Sudipto's third novel. Set against the backdrop of IIT Kharagpur and a nondescript place called Prembajar, which lies just outside the IIT campus, it was published by Niyogi Books and released in May 2019. Totally different from Sudipto's earlier two thrillers, this one, co-written with Aparajita Dutta, "has a bold theme, a much-needed voice to the many unconventional relationships that have been silenced since ages".

=== Jagadish Chandra Bose: The Reluctant Physicist ===
Jagadish Chandra Bose: The Reluctant Physicist is a contemporary biography of the Indian polymath, Sir Jagadish Chandra Bose, modern India’s first scientist, an eclectic pioneer in radio science, and the father of plant neurobiology. This marks Das's debut in non-fiction. Published by Niyogi Books, it was released in November 2023.

In this book, Das delves deep into the controversy surrounding the invention of radio or wireless, which, for a very long time, was attributed solely to the genius of Marconi, but not any more. Praised especially for its captivating narrative, the book transcends the boundaries of a conventional scientific chronicle by exploring India’s socio-political milieu.

== Community service ==
In 2020, Sudipto Das led a campaign to help the poor and the needy during the prolonged lockdown due to the COVID-19 Pandemic. The campaign provided daily rations to nearly 10,000 people across India, mostly migrant labourers, daily wage earners and poor people.
