= The Aryabhata Clan =

Novel by the Indian author Sudipto Das

First edition

The Aryabhata Clan (ISBN 978-9386906137) is the second novel by the Indian author Sudipto Das, published by Niyogi Books in December 2017. It was officially launched at the New Delhi World Book Fair, on 10 January 2018. Set against the backdrop of the Islamic State spreading its tentacles in India, it is a historical thriller and mystery novel where a 1,500-year-old verse composed by the Indian mathematician Aryabhata plays a crucial role in the deciphering of innumerable cryptic symbols, ancient signs, mysterious carpet motifs and a sinister plan to destabilize India.

The story is "set in a time period which is very similar to ours but with conspiratorial and complicated mysteries sprinkled into the ancestry of the main characters that have profound implications in shaping the history of mankind".

It's an independent sequel to Sudipto's previous novel, The Ekkos Clan.

== Plot ==
The Aryabhata Clan is set in 2010, nearly two decades after The Ekkos Clan that unfolded in the 1990s. The Islamic State is slowly but surely making forays into the spheres of academia, media and politics in India. Shamsur Ali, a physicist from Bangladesh, wants to destabilize India by creating a sort of apocalypse. Both the Islamic State and a right wing Hindu group plot to destroy the Taj Mahal. Afsar Fareedi, a linguistic paleontologist and the main protagonist of The Ekkos Clan, catches the fraud. Amid all this mayhem, there are three gruesome murders, including that of her father, perhaps to eliminate all traces of a carpet, which Afsar discovers, has a lot hidden in its mysterious motifs, and which incidentally her father had a hand in making. These events are connected by a riddle composed by the mathematician Aryabhata 1,500 years ago. But, "the central crisis that needs to be averted in the present is far more intricate than the historic riddle that needs to be resolved".

=== Background ===
Sudipto "pulls together the mysteries found in Iranian carpet motifs, a 1500-year-old verse by Indian mathematician Aryabhata, and cryptic symbols from ancient languages, and manuscripts to come up with a compelling argument about the inherent falseness of any kind of cultural demolition based on exclusion."

In a blog Sudipto has mentioned that one of the inspirations behind writing The Aryabhata Clan was to "talk about some of [the] unusual ways and media which play a big role in informally chronicling" the history of our country.

Sudipto has argued that the dominance of the leftist narrative for many years, since the independence of India, on academia and many aspects of art and culture has resulted in a serious problem in writing, teaching and learning history in India. Disastrously, it has suppressed the rightist narrative for too long, resulting in the recent times in the latter's sudden outburst and drastic efforts at creating a counter narrative, which more often than not is also not very authentic. Sudipto feels The Aryabhata Clan was an "attempt at retelling history as authentically as possible, without being driven by any agenda, either the leftist or rightist".

The mathematician Aryabhata plays a pivotal role in the novel. Sudipto wanted to write about the enigmatic Aryabhata because he believes "in many ways Aryabhata is perhaps one of the earliest and greatest Indian exports to the world."

The Aryabhata Clan also deals with Linguistics, Linguistic Paleontology, Digital Paleography, Epigraphy, Archaeology, Music, and many other diverse disciplines.

== Reviews ==
1. “A very readable sequel to The Ekkos Clan. Sudipto Das is a gifted storyteller,” said the reputed columnist Jug Suraiya.
2. "An ambitious piece of fiction... Designed a lot like The Da Vinci Code," said The Times of India.
3. “Intelligent narration and mindful suspense," said the Deccan Chronicle.
4. "The author rehashes his ability to spin extravagant plots that originate in the infancy of civilization with a winding path to an explosive resolution in the modern day," commented The Hans India in its review.
5. "A spirited 20-year-old woman... and the onus is on her to save India from an impending apocalypse," said Asian Age about the main protagonist Kubha. In a separate review, it said, The Aryabhata Clan "unearths, layer by layer through controlled suspense, a narrative of its own."
6. "A woman Indiana Jones or a Bond, working through a Da Vinci Code-like theme with history deeply woven into a contemporary thriller," pointed out The Hindu.
7. "The author spins a thrilling yarn... sends chills down your spine," extolled The New Indian Express.
8. "Gory, frightening and lunatic, the terror protagonist of the author will make you tremble at the sheer thought of waging a brutal war against the world in the name of fighting for peace," said Business Standard, in a review.
9. "This twisted tale of terror and violence lays bare the failure of extreme religious ideology in the face of false superiority," said Millennium Post, in a review.
10. "Born out of the experiences derived from the various lanes and by-lanes of his life, this novel of Sudipto's would definitely give unadulterated happiness to the readers," asserted the Bengali fortnightly Unish-Kuri.
11. "Full of excitement, The Aryabhata Clan is taut in building the story and the selection of its characters," said the Bengali daily Bartaman in its review of the novel.

== Criticism ==
Almost everyone has unanimously acknowledged that Sudipto's "familiarity with linguistics, linguistic paleontology, archetypes, digital paleography, epigraphy, archaeology, symbolism and music [is] impressive." But the heavy research, many felt, "make[s] the novel read more like [a] lesson in inductive reasoning at times. Another thing [that] weighs the novel down is a tendency towards verboseness."

"The book would probably make for an informative read," commented a reviewer, "but it just took away the hook and pace of a thriller."

The Bengali daily Bartaman found the language of the novel "wrapped in an Indian mold" a little too much. The critic found the "tight excitement losing to the language" at times.

Referring to "the oft repeated, misplaced references to the history of Islam" in the book, a reviewer felt, "had the author not amplified the canvas of his narrative to encompass Islamic Terrorism, we surely would have a plot for another James Bond blockbuster."

== In Media ==
=== Print & Online ===
1. Business Standard, 2 September 2018: Review, "The author takes the reader on a roller coaster ride to Sri Lanka, Bangladesh, Pakistan and to the motifs of Khushawari rugs."
2. The Times of India, 11 August 2018: Feature, A potpourri of action, suspense, conflict and politics, "Set against the global terrorism perpetrated by the Islamic State and their affiliates... Symbols, characters and mysteries set in a labyrinthine pattern."
3. The New Indian Express
  - 20 February 2018: Feature, Sudipto Das's The Aryabhata Clan: Tentacles of terrorism, "is a gripping tale on the rising Islamic State threat in the Indian subcontinent."
  - 28 January 2018: Featured in "Book Tastings" in the Sunday Magazine
4. The Hindu, 13 February 2018: Feature, Middle-path through history, "... the present work combines a diversity of themes ..."
5. Deccan Chronicle
  - 23 March 2018: Review, "Compelling argument about the inherent falseness of any kind of cultural demolition based on exclusion."
  - 1 February 2018: Feature, "... key to the mystery lies in a verse [...] by [...] Aryabhata..."
  - 1 March 2017: Feature, 'Ekkos'phere of feminism, "Sudipto Das has always had a knack to touch upon lesser discussed topics..."
6. The Asian Age
  - 18 March 2018: Review, "The Aryabhata Clan [...] knits together lore and material culture to expound on the unities of ancient India, Pakistan and Sri Lanka."
  - 31 January 2018: Feature, Mathematical cues, "Sudipto’s protagonists tend to be women and he wishes to keep it that way in all his books."
  - 10 January 2018: Featured in Delhi Age, in "Books"
7. Deccan Herald
  - 30 August 2018: Event Listing.
  - 14 January 2018: Featured in "Book Rack" in Sunday Herald
8. The Hans India, 28 January 2018: Review, "Conspiratorial and complicated mysteries sprinkled into the ancestry of the main characters that have profound implications in shaping the history of mankind"
9. DNA, 31 March 2018: Featured in New Releases.
10. The Statesman, 28 June 2018: New Arrivals.
11. Unish-Kuri (Bengali), 21 May 2018: "Sudipto has now come up with his second novel... The Islamic State is spreading its net slowly all over India's education, media and politics."
12. Bartaman (Bengali), 28 July 2018: Book Review, "Actions abound the plot from the very beginning. The writer makes it quite clear at the start that it's indeed a thriller..."

=== Blog ===
1. Reviews
2. Interviews
