= Neelabh Banerjee =

Indian cartoonist

Neelabh Banerje
- Born: 1965 (age 60–61); Lucknow, Uttar Pradesh, India
- Occupation: illustrator

Neelabh Banerjee is an Indian cartoonist, illustrator and comics artist. He created the character of the singing donkey Gardhab Das along with his brother cartoonist Jayanto Banerjee for the Indian children's magazine Target.

He is currently the national creative director at Reliance Industries. His animation series named Breaking Toons appear on CNN-IBN, IBN7 and ETV channels.

== Career ==
Neelabh was born in Lucknow in 1965. He started his career as a crime reporter at The Pioneer and later worked as a cartoonist and illustrator for Target magazine. He moved on to become a staff artist at the Times of India, where he was the national arts and illustrations editor. At the Times of India, Neelabh collaborated with associate editor Jug Suraiya to create the popular comic strip Dubyaman, 'a deranged superhero destined to skid on the banana peel of his own ineptitude' based on American president George Bush. The comic strips were collected in a book, Dubyaman's Duniya, which appeared in 2002. The two have also collaborated on the strip Duniya ke Neta which appeared in the Times of India.

== Bibliography ==
Neelabh collaborates with various people (Jug Suraiya, Amit Dasgupta, Ajit Ninan, Ravi Shankar, Aniruddha Bahal) to produce the strips.

- Jug Suraiya & Neelabh Banerjee (2002), Dubyaman's duniya, Mumbai, India: Egmont Imagination (India) Ltd., OL 22994396M
- Amit Dasgupta & Neelabh Banerjee (2009), Indian By Choice, Delhi, India: Wisdom Tree
- Ajit Ninan, Neelabh Banerjee & Jug Suraiya (2012), Jest in Time: 175 Years, Delhi, India: Times Group Books, ISBN 978-93-82299-54-7
- Pandit Ravi Shankar & Neelabh Banerjee (2013), Yours in Music: Graphic Autobiography of Ravi Shankar, Delhi, India: Wisdom Tree
- Aniruddha Bahal & Neelabh Banerjee (2015), The Cobrapost Affair: The Adventures of Rhea, Delhi, India: Harper Collins India

== See also ==
- Jug Suraiya
- Gardhab Das
