= Target (magazine) =

Indian children's magazine

Publication information
- Publisher: Living Media India Ltd.
- Publication date: 1979-1995

Target was a popular Indian children's magazine that was published monthly in English from 1979 to 1995. It featured a mix of reader contributions, stories from regular writers, do-it-yourself articles and several popular comic strips.

== History ==
In September 1979, Rosalind Wilson (1942 – July 28, 1992), a British expatriate educationist settled in Delhi started Target and became its founder-editor. The magazine was owned by Living Media, who also own the India Today Group. After Rosalind Wilson's death in 1992, the magazine's publication continued under Amena Jayal with its successful formula of stories and illustrations.

In 1995, in a move to target a larger age group, India Today Group wound up Target to start Teens Today magazine. This move was a failure, because, with its emphasis on fashion and urban life, Teens Today did not have the wide appeal of the unpretentious Target. Teens Today was edited by Target old-timer Vatsala Kaul.

== Content ==
Target's outstanding production values as well as the quality of cartoonists and writers on its editorial board made it stand out from other contemporary Indian children's magazines like Tinkle, Champak and Chandamama.

A popular feature in Target was pages with information on international pen friends. In the age before email revolutionised communication, having pen friends was a popular hobby, both for the purpose of knowing about the world at large, and collecting stamps from foreign countries.

Some of the popular comic strips published in Target were:

- Gardhab Das by Jayanto and Neelabh
- Detective Moochhwala and Funny World by Ajit Ninan
- Granny's Gupshup by Praloy Chakrovorty and Joygopal Podder and others
- It Happened in History, written by Renuka Narayanan and illustrated by Suddhasattwa Basu
- Science News illustrated by Priya Nagarajan and others

== Contributors ==
=== Writers ===
- Dilip Salvi
- Sigrun Srivastava
- Ruskin Bond
- Geeta Dharmarajan
- Jacquelyn Singh
- Joygopal Podder
- Mala Marwaha (author and illustrator)
- Margaret Bhatty
- Meera Govil
- Meera Uberoi
- Paro Anand
- Ramaa Isvaran
- Renuka Narayanan
- Roopa Pai
- Rupa Gupta
- Subhadra Sengupta
- Swapna Dutta
- Vijaya Ghosh (associate editor)
- Viswajita Das
- Vatsala Kaul (associate editor)

=== Illustrators ===
- Ajit Ninan (made the Funny World and All in Fun cartoon pages)
- Jayanto Banerjee
- Neelabh Banerjee
- Suddhasattwa Basu (creator of India's first animated cartoon series, Gayab Aya)
- Praloy Chakrovorty
- Sujata Singh
- Manjula Padmanabhan (author and illustrator)
- Priya Nagarajan
- Atanu Roy (illustrated the "HA! HA!" jokes page)
