= Gardhab Das =

Gardhab Das created by cartoonist brothers Neelabh Banerjee and Jayanto Banerjee was a comic section run in the Indian youth magazine Target. The main character Gardhab Das had a donkey face and was always depicted wearing a kurta and pajamas. His main trait was his singing or lack of it. He was a perpetually unemployed music teacher. Famously known for disturbing the peace with his vocals and his harmonium, he was always at loggerheads with his landlord, being a penniless 'singer'. In various strips, he gets jobs as a siren for the fire department, as a weapon during a war, and he also manages to fight and get the better of people like Tike Myson, a play on Mike Tyson and Bruce Lee. He also trains the double of Mykill Packson (Michael Jackson) on his tour to India. His only weapon: his vocals and his harmonium. The name Gardhab itself means "donkey" in Sanskrit and Das is a common Indian surname.

The strips were simplistic, and their appeal lay in the funky illustrations. This along with Detective Moochhwala made Target a highly anticipated magazine for children all over India during the mid-1980s through till the early 1990s.
