= The Ekkos Clan =

Novel by Sudipto Das

First edition

The Ekkos Clan (ISBN 978-93-81523-95-7, 978-14-95229-78-7) is a mystery novel written by Indian author Sudipto Das, based on historical research. It was published by Niyogi Books and released in India in July 2013 and officially launched at a function in Bangalore on 3 August 2013.

In less than a fortnight of its release The Ekkos Clan was at third position in the bestsellers list in Flipkart in the Literature and Fiction category. It was also at third position in the "Top 10 Bestsellers of the Week" at Oxford Bookstore in September 2013.

== Author ==
The Ekkos Clan is the debut novel of Sudipto Das, who holds an engineering degree from IIT Kharagpur. Sudipto, a veteran in the Semiconductor Industry, stays in Bangalore. He is a member of a music band Kohal, which he started in Bangalore in 2007 with his IIT friends. He has been a secretary at the Sarathi Socio Cultural Trust for many years, looking after their cultural initiatives in Bangalore. In September 2014 he recreated Eastern European melodies of the 1940s for the War Musical Schweyk in the Second World War by Bertolt Brecht.

== Plot summary ==
=== Thriller set against Ancient Indian history ===
Kubha tells many stories to her children. She has heard these stories from her ancestors. No one really knows where these stories came from. Many years later sometime during the 1990s, long after Kubha died a gruesome death during the partition riots of 1947, her grandson Kratu, who is doing his masters at Stanford University, and his girlfriend Afsar, who studies linguistic palaeontology, figure out that the stories are not mere bedtime tales. They discover that each story is rich in linguistic fossils and is actually in the form of a riddle which has clues to some explosive aspects of ancient Indian history not well known. They also come to know that all the unnatural deaths that have happened in their family over the past hundred years were all murders. Some fanatic group wants to eliminate the entire family of Kratu's to remove all traces of Kubha's stories, which if exposed will change the way the fanatics want the Indian history to be seen as. Kratu, Afsar and their friend Tista embark on a journey across continents to decipher Kubha's stories. While doing so, they also discover Kubha in a new light. They come to know of several things about Kubha's life which no one in Kratu's family knew till now.

=== Clash between two mysterious forces ===
"Kratu, Sudipto’s protagonist, finds himself suspended deep in a clash between two mysterious forces, and sets on a quest to find answers to questions that man has posed to himself every now and then: Where did I come from?"

=== Fanaticism ===
In a blog Sudipto says the following about his book:

Mine is more of a mystery novel, where there are lot of riddles in the form of small stories, each leading to some prehistoric event or anecdote, all of which together tell a tale of our civilization, our culture. It demystifies Rig Veda to a great extent, going into the behind-the-scene stories of Rig Veda and the ancient people who wrote them. It deals with fanaticism in the garb of an extremist nationalism, something that gave rise to Nazism. It deals with the identity of India and the Indian civilization. It deals with the gradual evolution of hierarchies in a society and many more and all the while I've tried not to disrupt the fast pace of a mystery novel.

== Background ==
"In India, there is the emergence of fiction and non-fiction writers who offer a sharp perspective, informed by their personal experiences, who are recording a historical (and painful) moment." Sudipto has mentioned in the acknowledgement of the book that the seed idea of The Ekkos Clan came from certain aspects of his grandmother's life. Having grown up with lot of stories about Bangladesh, from where his family had to flee during the partition riots of 1947, he has used Bangladesh and "the true stories which he heard... about the Partition" extensively in his book.

=== Bengal side of partition ===
Some of his readers have pointed out The Ekkos Clan is perhaps one of the very rare books which deals with the Bengal side of partition so vividly. The same was highlighted in an article in The New Indian Express. Sudipto talked about the sparse representation of the Bengal partition in Indian literature at a panel on Borderland Narratives of the Bengal Partition, held at the UIUC in April 2019.

=== Linguistic Palaeontology ===
The book also deals extensively with Linguistic Palaeontology, apart from other disciplines like Astronomy, Archaeology, History, Music, Mathematics and Poetry. "Sudipto wanted to come up with a literature that flourishes with [ancient] Indian history," and Linguistic Palaeontology has been used as the main tool to decode various controversial aspects of the ancient Indian history, which has left very little archaeological evidence.

==== Rig Veda & Indo-European Urheimat ====
A very extensive research on the Rig Veda and the various Indo-European topics form the foundation of the book. Sudipto has provided a selected list of research papers, especially the ones written by Harvard Indologist Michael Witzel, and other material referred by him at the end of the book. The book attempts to demystify the Rig Veda to a great extent, delving deep into behind the scene stories of the Rig Veda, the oldest book of the mankind.

Sudipto has added the following disclaimer in the acknowledgement: I am aware that the views expressed by various characters in the novel about the Indo-European Urheimat and the origin of the Aryans are controversial and may not be universally accepted. In this I have followed the school of thought espoused by Witzel et al.

=== Development of the book ===
Sudipto began working on the book in 2008 when he started reading about ancient Indo-European history and the Rig Veda. He began writing the book in July 2010, completing the first draft by November of the same year. A reviewer has pointed out that Sudipto "is holistic in his background research, dramatic in creating thrills and bluntly smart in his approach." He gave the first draft of the book, which was initially titled From The Horse's Mouth, to many of his acquaintances to know their reaction and feedback. He also got two critiques done by literary consultants in London and Delhi. He came up with the final draft of the book in December 2011 after which he approached publishers. He was represented by Writer's Side. Niyogi Books signed the contract with him in May 2012 and the final editing took close to a year. The book was released in July 2013.

== Companion book ==
Myths & Truths Behind The Ekkos Clan (ISBN 978-14-97574-20-5, 978-14-97588-41-7, 978-14-97576-90-2, 978-14-97588-39-4), published in April 2014 as a coffee table book, describes the language and history on which the novel was based.

== Reviews and comments ==
1. "A promising debut in the growing realm of modern Indian fiction", said Jug Suraiya, a senior columnist with Times of India, about the book.
2. "Sudipto Das’ debut novel combines ancient history, linguistic palaeontology, mathematics, music and a mystery story," said The Hindu.
3. "Application of linguistic palaeontology amidst a mystery novel marked with glimpses of mythology and historical narrative is unique in an Indian setting, and places both the author and the novel at a space currently occupied by a very few," commented a critic.
4. Sunday Guardian reviewed The Ekkos Clan on 17 August 2013: "For a novel whose setting stretches from the Partition-affected villages of Noakhali, Bangladesh to Arkaim in the Southern Urals, The Ekkos Clan is a daring novel. The scope of the narrative is magnanimous and deftly handled.... The Ekkos Clan should be read for its sheer aspiration and the intelligent handling of historical material."
5. The Telegraph reviewed it on 27 November 2013: "An Indian thriller inspired by Dan Brown & Harrison Ford! For a debut novel The Ekkos Clan is quite promising, with echoes of Dan Brown in the storytelling... [It] is like any fast-paced thriller, replete with murder and miraculous escapes."
6. Bangalore Mirror said it's "an interesting read for an afternoon. One feisty woman’s partition story..., The Ekkos Clan combines the struggle for survival with Kubha's determination to safeguard her lineage in turbulent times..."
7. The New Indian Express extolled its "unflinching look at communal carnage." A review was published on 26 November 2013: "A tale of the Indian civilization and culture, The Ekkos Clan written by debutant author Sudipto Das takes you on a roller coaster ride, telling the mystery behind the Aryan race as well as delving into the origin of stories behind mankind’s greatest book, The Rig Veda..."
8. Deccan Chronicle called Sudipto "Bin'das' writer..., a multi-talented personality."
9. Dutta Aparajita noted "The book is [...] a journey of discovery, through soul, through life."

=== Similarities with Dan Brown's novels ===
Many reviews and readers' comments are available online. Many readers have pointed out thematic similarities of The Ekkos Clan with Dan Brown's novels with Robert Langdon as the main protagonist. Sudipto acknowledges that he was "indeed inspired by characters like Robert Langdon and Indiana Jones, who solve intriguing mysteries about Christianity in popular thrillers", and that he has attempted to do something similar with the Indian perspective. But, he also clarifies, "putting his book in the same genre as those of the above may be misleading".

On the flip side, Sunday Guardian said, "there are rarely any flashes of literary brilliance, when it comes to the descriptive and the introspective." Few readers have complained about too many characters, which can be confusing.

== In Media ==
=== Print & Online ===
1. The Hindu
  - 12 June 2014: Feature, "the novel focuses on the various aspects of ancient culture, evolution of the people in the subcontinent and the hierarchy that forms the caste system..."
  - 19 October 2013: Event listing.
  - 11 October 2013: Feature, "Sudipto Das’ debut novel weaves Indian history and fiction..."
  - 26 September 2013: Feature, "If you are a history buff and a thriller aficionado, then The Ekkos Clan might just be the book for you..."
  - 2 August 2013: Feature, "... book launch of The Ekkos Clan by Sudipto Das will be held on August 3..."
2. Sunday Guardian, 17 August 2013: Book Review, "... The Ekkos Clan is a daring novel."
3. Deccan Herald, 1 September 2013: Featured in Sunday Herald, Book Rack.
4. Bangalore Mirror
  - 15 November 2013: One feisty woman’s partition story
  - 18 October 2013: Event listing.
  - 20 September 2013: Three Reads, "An interesting read for an afternoon"
5. Sakal Times
  - 6 October 2013: Interview, "It won't be a sequel per se... will be about the mathematician Aryabhatt."
6. Star of Mysore, 4 October 2013: Interview, "My second book named Prembajar..."
7. Techgoss.com, 10 October 2013: Interview, "IIT educated Sudipto Das has written his first novel ‘Ekkos Clan’ and it is already a best seller.."
8. The New Indian Express
  - 24 June 2014: Feature, "The Ekkos Clan is a mystery novel dealing with controversial aspects of ancient India which have left very little archaeological evidences"
  - 26 November 2013: Review, "Of linguistics, history and philosophy"
  - 15 October 2013: Feature, "Sudipto Das, the author of The Ekkos Clan, writes, perhaps for the first time, on the sufferings of people of the Bangladesh side during the 1947 Partition of India..."
  - 12 October 2013: Feature, "An Unflinching Look at Communal Carnage"
9. Deccan Chronicle
  - 23 October 2013: Feature, "Bin'das' Writer..."
  - 19 October 2013: Event listing.
  - 18 October 2013: Event listing.
10. NY.NEWSYAPS, 23 October 2013: Review & Feature, Cultural Superiority and the modern Indian: A conversation around The Ekkos Clan
11. Delhi Diary, 1–15 November 2013: Feature, "The book is a feed of intellect, facts, fiction and mysteries..."
12. The Telegraph, 27 November 2013: Review & interview, "References to astronomy, archaeology and the Rig Veda and cryptic rhymes pepper the novel..."
13. Absolute India, 2 February 2014: Interview, "Anyone who reads can also write"

=== Blogosphere ===
1. Reviews
2. Interviews
