= Joygopal Podder =

Indian writer (born 1960)

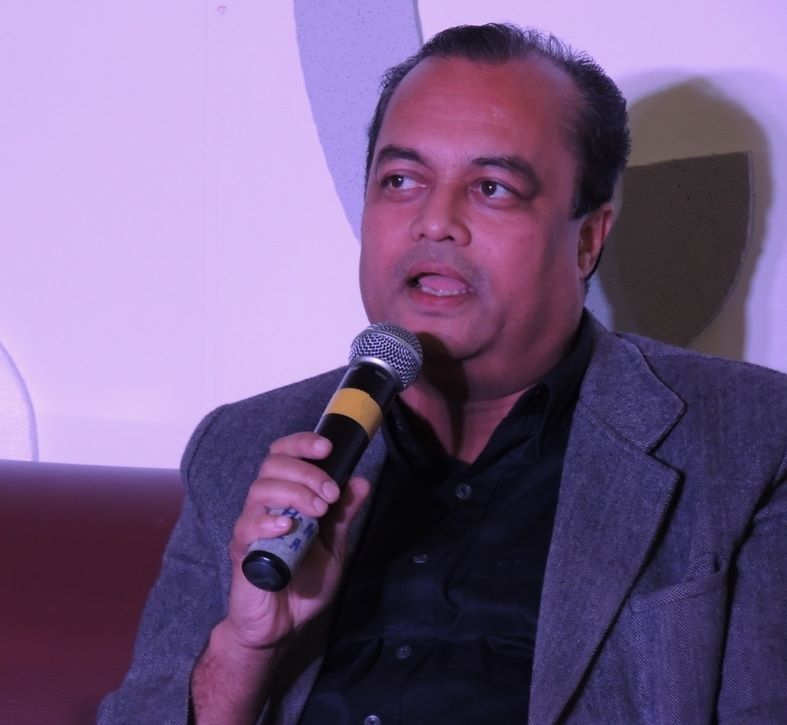
- 19 May 1960
- Born: Joygopal Podder; 19 May 1960 (age 66); London, Great Britain
- Occupation: Writer
- Writing career
- Genre: Crime fiction

Joygopal Podder (born 19 May 1960, London, Great Britain) is an Indian writer. In 2016 he was listed in the Limca Book of Records for having had 15 crime fiction novels published in 57 months. Before this he went on to feature in Limca Book of Records five times; in 2015 as the author who has had 14 crime fiction novels published in 45 months, as the author with most books on crime fiction in shortest time in 2013 and in 2014, for writing five crime fiction novels in nine months in 2012, and writing 10 crime fiction in 21 months.

== Early life and family background ==
He was eight years old when his mother - a homemaker - and his father - a surgeon moved to New Delhi. He is married and lives with his wife and two daughters in Gurgaon, India.

== Career ==
When studying in University of Delhi, Joygopal Podder was a popular contributor for Target magazine. He is a Gold Medalist Law Graduate from the University of Delhi. Podder worked 17 years for different companies as a marketer. He changed to the social sector in 2000 and was last a fund-raising director of a leading NGO fighting against poverty. His successful career allowed him to be a full-time author and part-time consultant to NGOs.

Joygopal Podder started writing at age 50, in 2010, because of love for his wife who became ill.

His first book was Deceivers. Deceivers is a compilation of two thrillers set in the backdrop of the social sector. Since then, 18 of his books have been published, 15 crime fiction but also two romantic comedy and one non-fiction. His latest releases are 3 mixed up men, romantic novel, Dynasty, crime thriller and Chief Minister's Mistress crime thriller. Chief Minister's Mistress is reviewed in Indian Express and Joygopal Podder's skills are compared there with those of John Grisham.

He writes so fast that he has been called "India's marathon author". Joygopal Podder's bestsellers include Millennium City, Beware of the Night, Superstar, Merchants of Dreams and Vanished. Various interviews give insight in Podders work. In "Scripting a novel record" (Hindustan Times) he tells the readers about his motivation sources and his life.

Podder is one of 100 Indian authors who are on the Forbes (India) "Celebrity 100 Nominees List" for 2014.

=== Major literary work ===
- (September 2010) Deceivers Pustak Mahal
- (October 2010) The Inheritance Peacock Books
- (2011) The Landlord's Secret And Other Stories Atlantic Publishers
- (2011) Millennium City Prakash Books
- (2011) High Alert Atlantic Publishers
- (2011) Truth Is Greater Than Fiction
- (2011) Superstar Prakash Books
- (2012) Mumbai Dreams V&S Publishers
- (2012) Beware Of The Night Vitasta Publishing
- (2012) A Million Seconds Too Late Vitasta Publishing
- (2012) Merchants Of Dreams Vitasta Publishing
- (2013) Vanished Vitasta Publishing
- (2013) Goddess V&S Publishers
- (2014) My Friend's Unsuitable Fiancee Author's Empire Publications
- (2014) My Husband, My Lover, My Husband's Lover Author's Empire Publications
- (2014) 3 MIXED UP MEN Omji Publishing House
- (2014) Dynasty Omji Publishing House
- (2015) Chief Minister's Mistress Fingerprint Publishing / Prakash Books
- (2016) The Anniversary Killer AuthorsPress, New Delhi
- (2016) Cancer AuthorsPress, New Delhi

== See also ==
- List of Indian writers
