= Taranauts =

Series of children's novels by Roopa Pai

- Cover of Book 1
- Author: Roopa Pai
- Illustrator: Priya Kuriyan
- Language: English
- Genre: Fantasy; Children's novel
- Publisher: Hachette India
- Publication place: India
- Media type: Print (Paperback)

Taranauts is a series of children's novels by Indian author Roopa Pai. It is India's first fantasy-adventure series for children in English. The eight-part series, aimed primarily at the 8-12 age group, is published by Hachette India Children's Books. The first book of the series, The Quest for the Shyn Emeralds, was published in the first week of December 2009. The eighth and final book, The Magic of the Dazl Corals, was released in July 2013.

== Plot summary ==
All the action in the Taranauts books takes place in Mithya, a universe comprising the eight worlds of Shyn, Dazl, Lustr, Glo, Syntilla, Shimr, Sparkl and Glytr. Mithya's worlds are sustained by the cool multicoloured light of the 32 stars that make up Tara, Mithya's supersun. All eight worlds bob around in the endless ocean of Dariya, around the bad-tempered volcano, Kay Laas.

The story opens with Mithya is in the grip of the Great Crisis. The 32 stars of Tara have been captured by master villain Shaap Azur, twin brother of Shoon Ya, the brave, wise Emperaza of Mithya, and Mithya has been plunged into darkness. The only way to release the stars is to crack the 32 riddles that have been hidden in the eight worlds, within a certain timeframe.

The Taranauts – Zvala, Zarpa, and Tufan – were picked as Mithya's champions by the Emperaza Shoon Ya and his female lieutenant, Shuk Tee. Together, the Taranauts are a formidable team. Their mission is to travel to each of the eight worlds of Mithya in turn, where they will attempt to locate, retrieve and crack hidden riddles.

== Major characters ==
- Zvala: Zvala is the child of Fire – she can glow with warmth and light or burn everything in her path. She is also the brainiac of the team, and a huge fan of Mithya's teen pop superstar, Dana Suntana.
- Zarpa: Zarpa is the child of the superserpent Shay Sha – she can move faster than anyone else her age, stretch herself into a long thin rope, and twist her body into all manner of pretzel shapes.
- Tufan: Tufan is the child of the Wind, who absorbs evaporating water whenever he travels across a water body and "rains" at the most inconvenient moments. He can use his powerful lungs to blow up a stormy hurricane or whistle a soothing breeze.

== Books ==
- Book 1 – The Quest for the Shyn Emeralds
- Book 2 – The Riddle of the Lustr Sapphires
- Book 3 – The Secret of the Sparkl Amethysts
- Book 4 – The Race for the Glo Rubies
- Book 5 – The Mystery of the Syntilla Silvers
- Book 6 – The Key to the Shimr Citrines
- Book 7 – The Search for the Glytr Turquoises
- Book 8 – The Magic of the Dazl Corals

== Structure and genre ==
Taranauts liberally references Indian mythology, Indian classical and pop culture, and contemporary Indian history and society, although no knowledge of any of these is necessary to understand and enjoy the story.

It also uses plenty of "portmanteau wordplay", combining English and Indian languages, or two different Indian languages, to create words in Taratongue, the language of Mithya. For e.g.: In Taratongue, a Morphoroop (a combination of the English morph and the Sanskrit roop (form)) is a shapeshifter; an Achmentor (from the Sanskrit Acharya (teacher) and the English mentor) is a master tutor, a meenmaach (from the Tamil meen (fish) and the Bengali maach (fish)) is a creature of the sea.

The main protagonists – the Taranauts – tackle four challenges (crack four riddles) in each book. The challenges are a mix of word, numerical, memory, logic, and visual puzzles, in combination with physical, mental and emotional challenges.

Taranauts combines many genres, including fantasy, adventure and science fiction, with elements of mystery and satire. Characters are not portrayed as intrinsically good or evil, but as having made the right – or wrong – choices.

== Reception ==
Taranauts is widely regarded as both a critical and popular success in the field of original children's English language literature published in India.
