= Jayanto Banerjee =

Indian cartoonist

Jayanto Banerjee (born 1958), who signs his work Jayanto, is an Indian cartoonist and illustrator. He created the character of the singing donkey Gardhab Das with his cartoonist brother Neelabh Banerjee for the Indian children's magazine Target.

Jayanto was born in Lucknow in 1958. He went to the Christ Church School and had started freelancing while still a teenager, when he landed up at Target magazine. Here he worked as a cartoonist and illustrator, continuing the iconic Gardabh Das strip with Neelabh for twelve years. Later he moved to the India Today Group where he worked on design & illustration for many projects related to politics, business, technology, and especially the lifestyle magazine of the publishing house. Some of his editorial cartoons from this period appear in The India Today Book of Cartoons (Books Today, 2000).

After leaving the India Today Group, he has worked at the Asian Age. He is now at the Hindustan Times, where his cartoon Tooning In appears regularly.

== Awards and honors ==
- 26 Aug 2023 | BARTONS lifetime Achievement Award | By Indian Institute of Cartoonists

== See also ==
- Gardhab Das
