= Margaret Bhatty =

Indian writer (1930-2012)

Margaret Ruth Bhatty
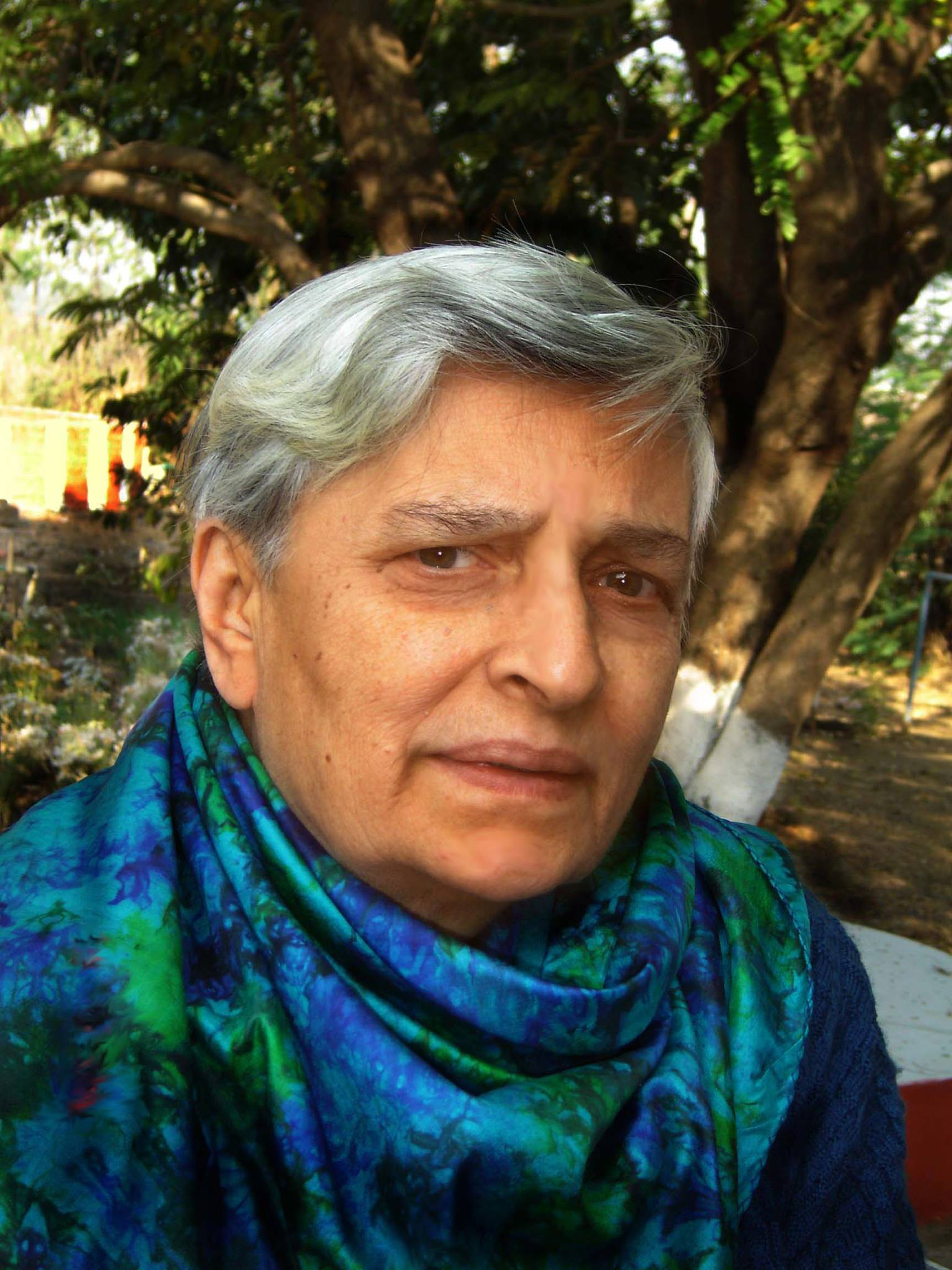
- Born: Margaret Ruth Grundy; October 5, 1930; Berinag, United Provinces, British India (now in Uttarakhand, India)
- Died: July 20, 2012 (aged 81); Pune, Maharashtra, India
- Citizenship: India
- Education: Isabella Thoburn College; Hislop College
- Children: 2
- Writing career
- Genres: Narrative nonfiction, fantasy
- Notable works: All is Maya, All is Illusion My Enemy, My Friend
- Notable awards: BBC World Service International Story Contest (1982); BBC World Service International Drama Contest (1995)

Margaret Ruth Bhatty (née Grundy, 5 October 1930 – 20 July 2012) was an Indian schoolteacher, freelance journalist and writer of children's books and short stories for adults.

== Early life ==
Margaret Ruth Bhatty was born on 5 October 1930 to Mark Vernon Grundy and Pansy Gunasekra in Berinag, which is currently part of the Indian state of Uttarakhand. She spent her childhood in Berinag, fishing, hunting and trekking in the Kumaon region. A deep love for nature was instilled in her during her growing years in Berinag. She attended Wellesley Girls School, Nainital. She later went on to pursue a Bachelor of Arts degree from Isabella Thoburn College, Lucknow and then a postgraduate degree in Journalism from Nagpur.

== Family and marriage ==
On 17 December 1954, she married Feroze Bhatty. They have two children together: a son, Arvind (born 25 December 1955) and a daughter Pritam (born 13 September 1960).

Bhatty died on 20 July 2012 in Pune, India.

== Career ==
Bhatty worked as a teacher in Isabella Thoburn College, Lucknow after she completed her college education. She also worked as a journalist in Nagpur, contributing articles to The Hitavada newspaper. Bhatty worked as a school teacher at Kimmins High School, Panchgani in 1963 and at All Saints Girls School, Nainital.

She was a regular contributor to the popular children's magazine Target and English-language newspapers in India, and was also published in magazines of humanist and secular organizations in India, Australia, New Zealand, the US and on the internet.

== Awards ==
Bhatty won the first prize in the 1982 BBC World Service International Story Contest among 800 entries worldwide for her story, "All is Maya, All is Illusion". This story was published in the BBC's collection of stories, Short Stories from Around the World.

In 1995, she won the BBC World Service International Drama Contest for her radio play on communal violence, My Enemy, My Friend.

== List of works ==
=== Plays ===
- My Enemy, My Friend

=== Children's books ===
- The Adventures of Bhim the Bold (1976)
- The Never-Never Bird (1979)
- The Secret of Sickle Moon Mountain (1981)
- Travelling Companions (1982)
- The Red and Gold Shoe (1984)
- Little Old Woman (picture book) (1990)
- The Evil Empire (1992)
- Kingdom of No Return (1993)
- The Circus Boy
- The Family at Paangar Pani (1995)
- The Mystery of the Zamorin's Treasure (1995)
- Himalayan Holiday
- Kidnapping at Birpur
- Chicken Mama (2007)

=== Novels ===
- The Arsonist (2011)

=== Short stories for adults ===
- "Miss Das and the Population Explosion" (1960)
- "The Murderer in the Cow-shed", published in Winter Tales 17 (1971)
- "The Resin Man", published in Winter Tales 22 (1976)
- "Reprieve" (1977)
- "Bella's World" (excerpt from the novel The Return of the Sorceress) (1998)
- "The Birdman" (2001)

=== Narrative nonfiction ===
- Astrology: Science or Ego-Trip by B. Premanand & Margaret Bhatty (2002)
- Fraud, Fakery and Flim-Flam (2008)
- Freedom
