= Roopa Pai =

Indian children's writer (fl. 21st c.)

- Born: Bangalore, India
- Occupations: Children's author; Journalist
- Notable work: Taranauts
- Spouse: Arun Pai

Roopa Pai is children's author and journalist living in Bangalore, India. She has over 20 published books, which include the India's first fantasy-adventure series for childrenTaranauts, and the national best seller The Gita for Children, which also won the 2016 Crossword Award for children's writing.

== Biography ==
Pai was born in a Lingayat family in Bangalore. She started writing during her 11th standard, first writing articles for the Deccan Herald. She went on to complete an engineering degree and moved to Delhi after her marriage. There she started writing for the children's magazine Target.

The couple eventually shifted to London, where she wrote articles covering Indian restaurants in London, for the Travel Trends magazine. She was also commissioned by the British Tourism Authority to cover hotels and accommodations for Indian tourists across the UK. The couple eventually moved back to Bangalore.

== Bibliography ==
- 2004 – Chanakya: The Master Statesman, published by Roopa Publications India
- 2008 – Ticket Bengaluru, published by Stark World India
- 2011 – The Quest For The Shyn Emeralds, book 1 of the Taranauts series, published by Hachette India
- 2011 – Riddle of the Lustr Sapphires, book 2 of the Taranauts series, published by Hachette India
- 2012 – The Secret of the Sparkl Amethysts, book 3 of the Taranauts series, published by Hachette India
- 2012 – The Race for the Glo Rubies, book 4 of the Taranauts series, published by Hachette India
- 2012 – The Mystery of the Syntilla Silvers, book 5 of the Taranauts series, published by Hachette India
- 2012 – The Key to Shimr Citrines, book 6 of the Taranauts series, published by Hachette India
- 2012 – The Search for the Glytr Turquoise, book 7 of the Taranauts series, published by Hachette India
- 2013 – The Magic of the Dazl Corals, book 8 of the Taranauts series, published by Hachette India
- 2014 – What If Earth Stopped Spinning? And 24 Other Mysteries, published by Roopa Publications India
- 2015 – The Gita for Children, published by Hachette India
- 2017 – So You Want to Know About Economics, published by Roopa Publications India
- 2017 – Ready!: 99 Must-Have Skills for the World-Conquering Teenager (and Almost-Teenager), published by Hachette India
- 2018 – Krishna Deva Raya: King of Kings, published by Eicher Goodearth
- 2019 – The Vedas and Upanishads for Children, published by Hachette India
- 2019 – From Leeches to Slug Glue: 25 Explosive Ideas That Made (and Are Making) Modern Medicine, published by Penguin Random House India

== Awards and recognition ==
- 2016 – Won Crossword Award for children's writing for her book The Gita for Children
- 2017 – Nominated for Femina 2017 women award in the "Literary Contribution" category
