= Ajit Ninan =

Indian political cartoonist (1955–2023)

- Born: Ajit Ninan; 15 May 1955 Hyderabad, India
- Died: 8 September 2023 (aged 68) Mysore
- Areas: Cartoonist, Writer, Artist, Inker, Colourist
- Notable works: Detective Moochhwala; Ajit Ninan's Funny World, Just Like That!.
- Awards: BARTON'S Lifetime Achievement Award By Indian Institute of Cartoonists
- Spouse: Elizabeth Ninan
- Children: Samyukta, Aparajita
- Relatives: Abu Abraham (Uncle)

Ajit Ninan (15 May 1955 – 8 September 2023) was an Indian political cartoonist, best known for drawing the Centrestage series of cartoons in India Today magazine and Ninan's World in the Times of India.

Ajit Ninan was born to AM Mathew and Annie Mathew in Hyderabad. He did his MA in Political Science from Madras Christian College, Chennai. He lived in New Delhi, where he worked for The Times of India. He died on 8 September 2023, at the age of 68.

== Comic strips ==
- Detective Moochhwala, published in Target magazine.

== Cartoons ==
- Ajit Ninan's Funny World, published in Target magazine
- Just Like That! published daily in the Times Of India.
- Like That Only! (along with Jug Suraiya), published bi-weekly in the Times Of India.
- Centrestage, published in India Today
- Ninan's World, published in the Times of India
- Poli Tricks, a series of cartoons during the 2009 Indian general elections, published in the Times of India
- iToons: a single panel cartoon strip in The Times of India - with Sunil Agarwal

== Books ==
- Ajit Ninan and Jug Suraiya (2007). Like That Only. Times Group Books. ISBN 978-81-89906-13-9.
- Ninan, Ajit, and Sudeep Chakravarti (eds.). The India Today Book of Cartoons. New Delhi: Books Today, 2000.

== Awards and honors ==
- 06 Aug 2022 | BARTONS lifetime Achievement Award | By Indian Institute of Cartoonists
