= Detective Moochwala =

Detective Moochhwala is an eponymous Indian magazine comic strip created by the well-known Indian cartoonist Ajit Ninan. The strip chronicles the adventures of Moochhwala, a fictional detective, and his dog, Pooch, who solve several crimes armed with high-tech equipment and a little chutzpah.

== History ==
The comic series appeared in an Indian youth magazine Target (part of the India Today Group) between 1979 and 1991. The strip was notable for its illustrations, which were remarkably detailed and high quality for the time.

Detective Moochhwala was a staple of children and youngsters in India for a number of years. The comic strip was stopped sometime in 1991, when the magazine underwent a renaissance and transformed itself into a more text-oriented version.

== Characters ==
The main characters are Moochhwala the detective and his pet dog Pooch. The crime-fighting duo were sometimes referred to in the strip as "Mooch and Pooch", and managed to crack even the most difficult of cases.

Moochhwala in Hindi literally means "man with a moustache". He is depicted as a pot-bellied, stubby-legged man with little hair, and a trademark inverted "V" moustache.

Poonch in Hindi means "tail". Pooch was of indeterminate breed, and possessed above average intelligence for a dog. Pooch is able to talk with other animals by using a device called the "Communico".

Another notable feature of the strip was the names of police inspectors who came to clean up at the end of the strip; they always had very apt Hindi-English words.
