= Artrightis Theatre Group =

Indian theatre group

ART-RIGHT-IS Theatre Group
- Formation: 2013
- Type: Theatre group
- Location: Bangalore, India
- Artistic director: Sharmin Ali

The Artrightis Theatre Group (styled ART-RIGHT-IS) is an Indian theatre company, established in Bangalore in 2013 by author and theatre artist Sharmin Ali. They have since staged several plays around Bangalore.

== History ==
Sharmin Ali started her theatrical career on stage at the Alliance française, Bangalore. Soon after, she started her own production house, ART-RIGHT-IS. Their shows, including Chutzpah and EREBUS- darkness personified, have been staged around Bangalore, and have received critical acclaim.

== Productions ==
- Potli Baba Ki Paltan was staged on 1 May 2014 at Rangoli Arts Center, Bangalore. A combination of gurus and shishyas appeared on stage, under the direction of a group of both first-time and expert directors.
- EREBUS- Darkness Personified was staged on 14 June 2014, also at the Rangoli Metro Arts Centre. Based on Greek mythology, the show portrayed several shades of the Greek God Erebus who personifies darkness. The show was billed as "An orgasm that lasts for 70 minutes: Self-Hedonism and Paranoia!".
- The Penis Monologues, originally written by Jason Cassidy, was adapted and produced for Indian audiences by ART-RIGHT-IS, and first staged on 28 August 2014 in Bangalore. The work explores male attitudes towards sex, women, violence, and emotional insecurities, and was directed by Sharmin Ali and three other directors.
- Aurora, a collection of short plays, was staged on 22 November 2014, at Alliance Francaise in Bangalore.
- Chutzpah premiered on 17 April 2015 at Chowdiah Memorial Hall, Bangalore. The characters in this 90-minute musical satire written by Ali are women who have broken free from their inhibitions to defy stereotypes. A group of activists took offence to the play's title, 'Chutzpah', a Hebrew word meaning 'audacity', having misunderstood it as a vulgar word in Hindi.
