= Suddhasattwa Basu =

Indian illustrator

- Born: 1956 (age 69–70); Chandannagar, West Bengal, India
- Education: Government College of Art & Craft

Suddhasattwa Basu (born 1956) is an Indian author, painter, illustrator, and animator. Born in West Bengal, he spent his childhood in a small town named Chandannagar, West Bengal. Basu studied fine arts at the Government College of Art & Craft in Kolkata. He began his career as an illustrator and designer for the children's magazine Target. He has illustrated several children's books. The Song of a Scarecrow (2002) written and illustrated by him received the Chitrakatha award, and a special mention at the Biennial of Illustration, Bratislava, Slovakia in 2003. He has conceptualised and illustrated many titles for the National Book Trust, such as Whatever you give and Ravan's Remedy, for preschool children. Basu's works include his nature illustrations for Khushwant Singh's Nature Watch, Delhi Through the Seasons and his work in Ka: The Story of Garuda (2004), by Roberto Calasso, retold by Geeta Dharmarajan. Basu designed, directed and animated India's first indigenously made animation television serial for children Ghayab Aya. It was made in ten parts and first telecast on Doordarshan in July 1990. Suddhasattwa Basu works and lives in New Delhi, India.

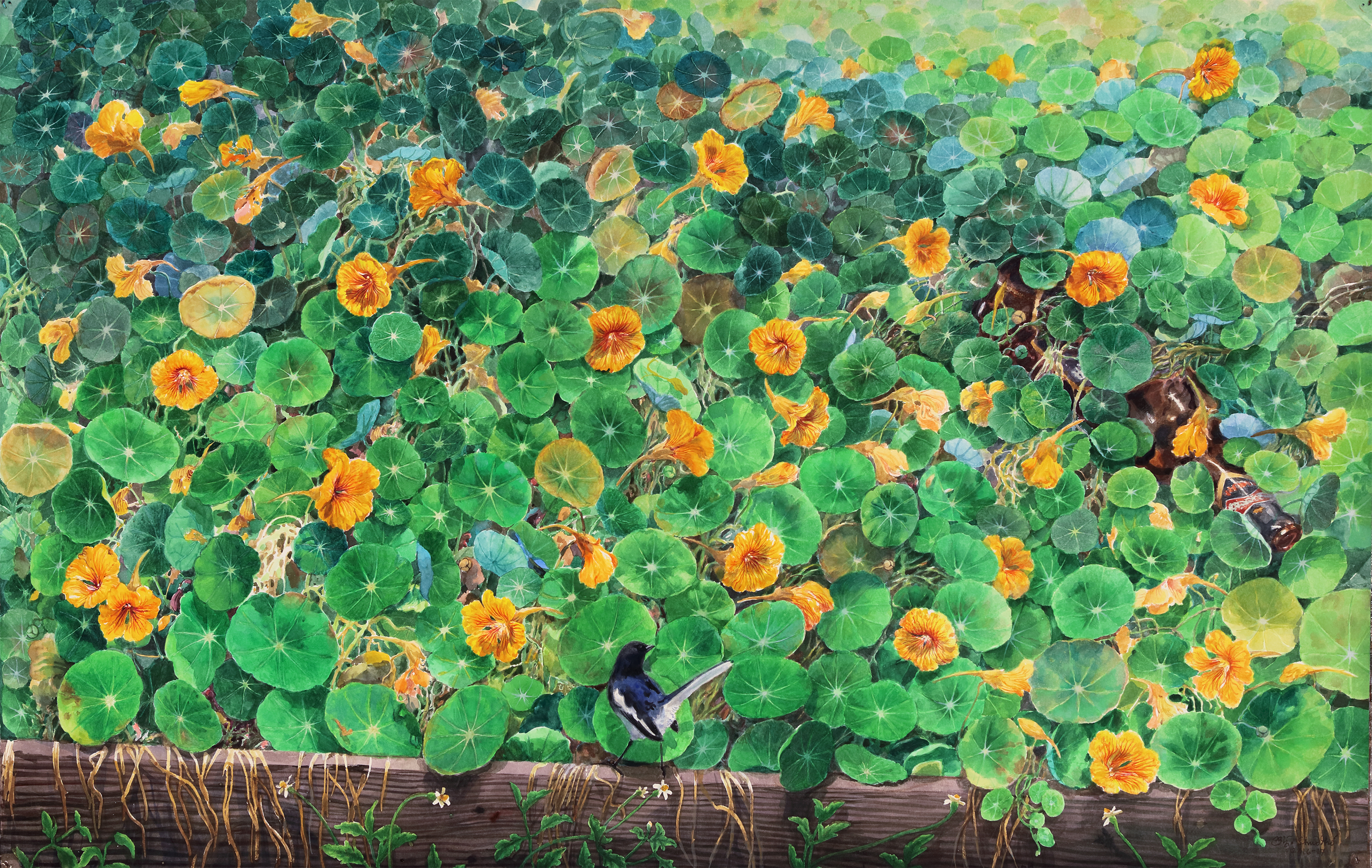
watercolour on paper, 22” x 36”, 2017

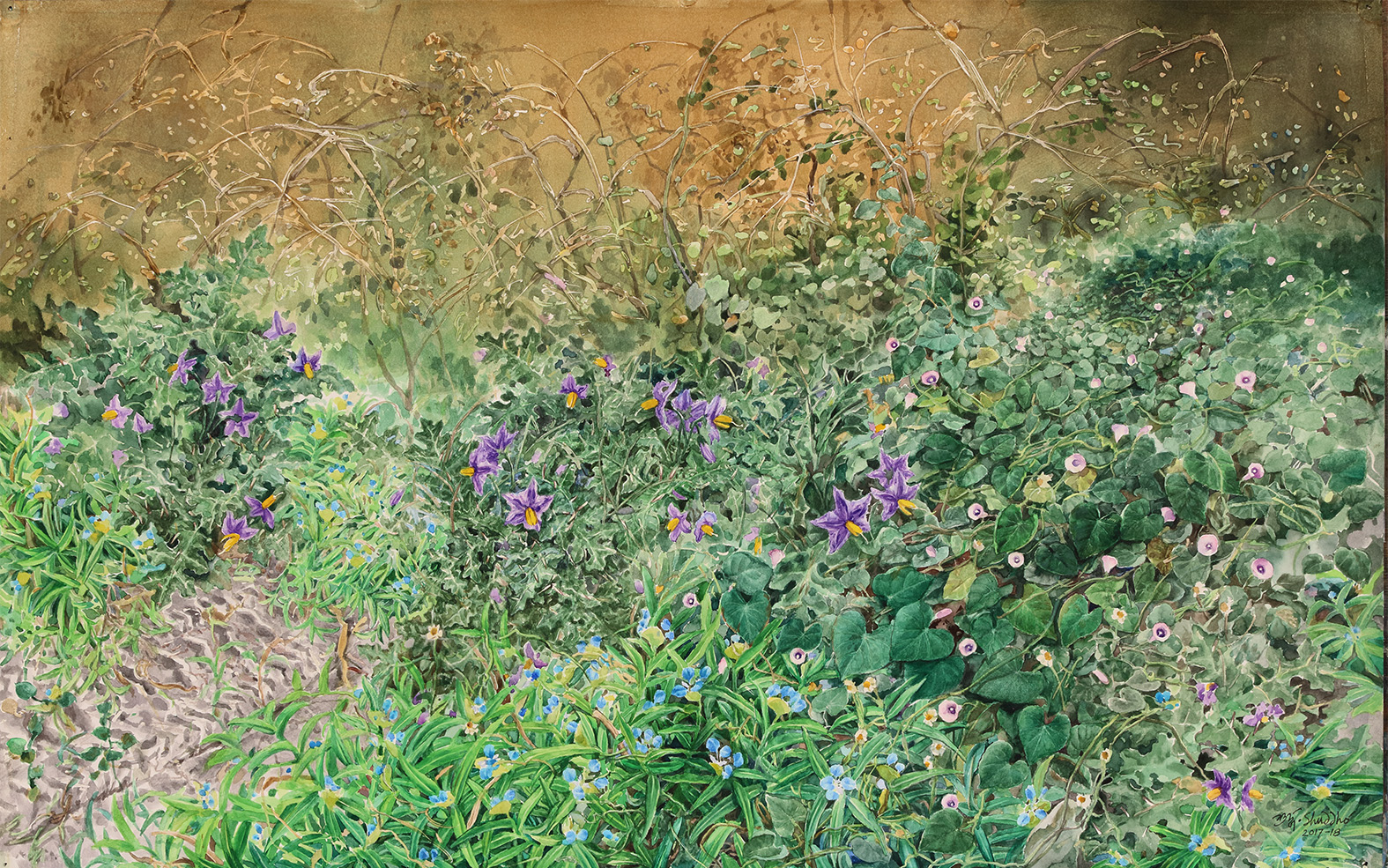
watercolour on paper, 22” x 36”, 2017 – 18

== As Author and Illustrator ==
- The Song of the Scarecrow (2002) by Suddhasattwa Basu (Katha Books)
- Whatever You Give (2009), National Book Trust, Delhi
- Ravan Remedy (2013), National Book Trust, Delhi

== As Illustrator ==
- Nature Watch (1990) by Khushwant Singh (Lustre Press)
- Ka, the story of Garuda (2004) by Geeta Dharmarajan, adapted from the text by Roberto Calasso.
- The Homecoming by Vijaya Sulaiman (1997), Ravi Dayal Publishers, Delhi
