= Sarathi Socio Cultural Trust =

Indian nonprofit organization

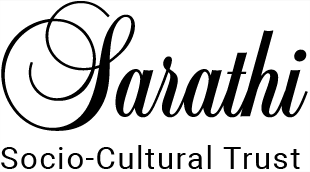
Sarathi Socio Cultural Trust

Sarathi Socio Cultural Trust is a non profit organization in Bangalore, founded in 2003. The organization is involved in organizing socio-cultural events in Koramangala, the highlight being the grand "Durga Puja", which sees at least 150,000 to 200,000 visitors every year, and which got the "Senco Sharod Samman" award for the best ambiance and crowd management in 2018. In 2020, Sarathi used its funds to help many people, like the idol-makers and others, whose livelihoods were badly impacted due to the pandemic.

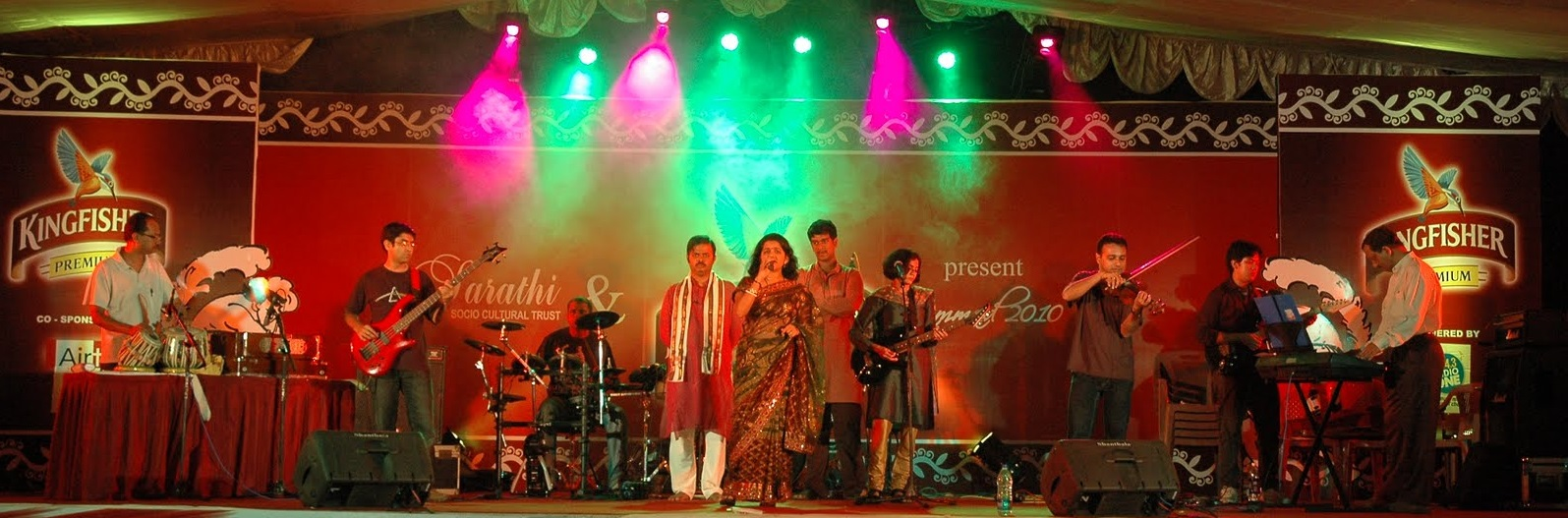
Sammad 2010

Transcending the boundaries of provincialism, ethnicity and languages, Sarathi encourages people from all communities to participate in its cultural fiesta, branded as Sammad - "an Indian cultural extravaganza", which was inaugurated by the likes of Tejasvi Surya (2019), Justice Santhosh Hegde, Captain Gopinath and Ashok Soota over the years. "One of the oldest" in the city, it's "more contemporary in terms of crowd" among the various Durga Puja celebrations in Bangalore.

Seen as "a meeting ground for young people, many from the IT, banking and other sectors, who form the cream of Bangalore", major corporate brands like UB, HSBC, Reliance Jewels and others were involved with Sammad over the years.

Important cultural icons, the likes of Ash King, Rupankar, Kavita Krishnamoorthy, Anupam Roy, Srijit Mukherji, Parambrata Chatterjee, Srikanto Acharya, Lopamudra, Somlata, June Banerjee, Neel Dutt, Bhoomi, Cactus, Paras Pathar and others, have performed at Sammad.

== Background ==
Being the hub of IT in the nineties, Koramangala has been a focus of many Bengalis for whom the nearest Durga Puja was Ulsoor. This prompted a group of people staying in and around Koramangala, who "pined for home at that time of the year when the dhaaks beat out their insistent rhythm and the smell of egg rolls is redolent in the air", to start one in Koramangala.

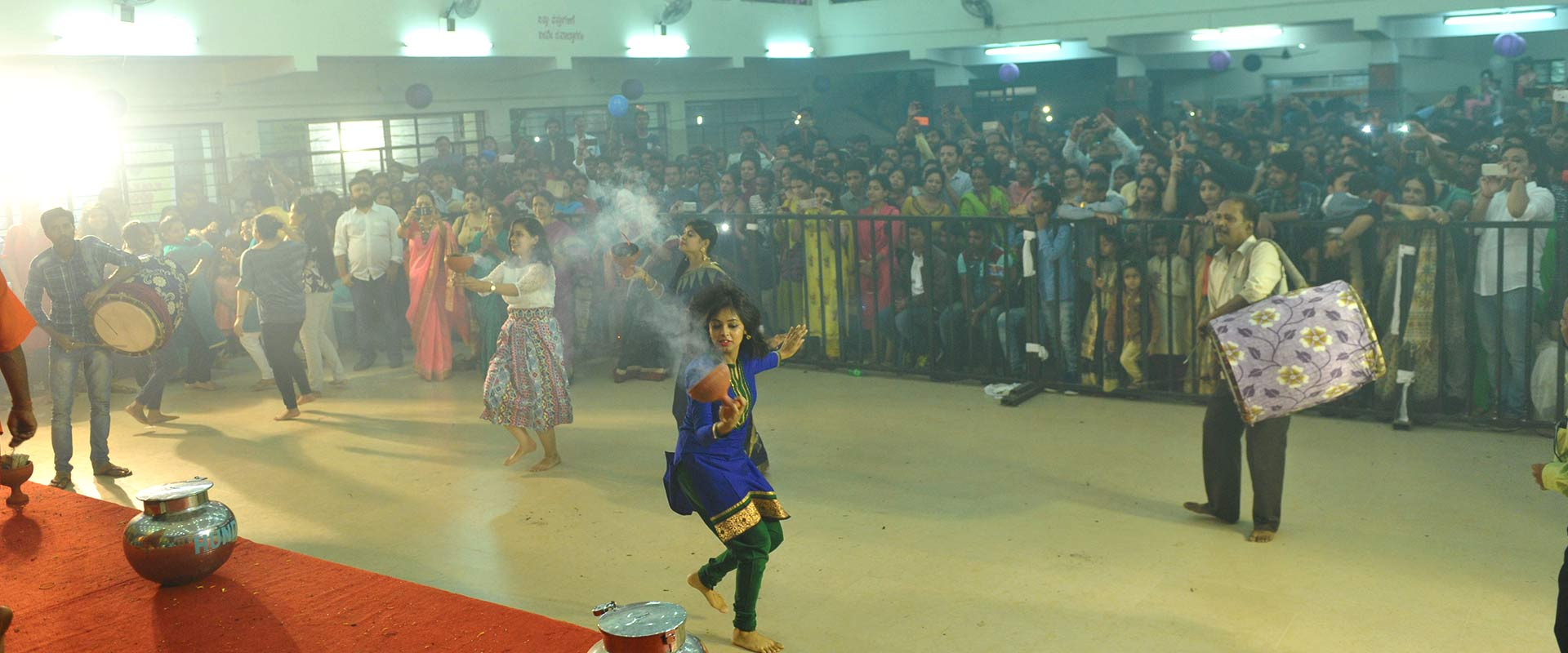
Dhunuchi Naach

Though over the years its USP has been a "new age feel", with events like fashion show and "rock competition [Bandemonium] for college students during the five days of celebrations", it's also rooted in tradition and culture through the unique programs based on fusion of contemporary and classical dance forms, Ulu dhwani and Sankha (conch) blowing competition, Dhunuchi (censer) Dance competition, as well as dhaaki (traditional Bengali drum players) competition.

Their general theme has been always "'Bibidher Majhe Milan', that is "Unity in Diversity". [Their] various cultural programmes [] celebrate the essence of India, rather than just Bengali culture."

Author and musician Sudipto Das is currently the General Secretary of Sarathi Socio Cultural Trust.

== Awards ==
1. Maitree Bandhaan organized "Senco Sharod Samman Award 2018" for the best ambiance and crowd management.

== Media ==
=== 2020 ===
1. The trust [...] will use its festival funds to help people, like idol-makers, whose livelihoods have been affected due to the restrictions on celebrations. - The Hindu, 20 October 2020

=== 2019 ===
1. This [...] will be inaugurated by Tejasvi Surya, member of Parliament, on October 3 at 7pm - The Hindu, 1 October 2019.
2. The celebration has transcended the boundaries of provincialism, ethnicity and languages - Deccan Herald, 3 October 2019.
3. The grand food court will offer a variety of modern and traditional dishes from across the country - Deccan Herald, 3 October 2019.
4. Koramangala might be ridden with potholes and broken roads but making a trip to this pandal, set up by Sarathi Socio-Cultural Trust, is worth it - Bangalore Mirror, 4 October 2019.
5. We're here at Koramangala's popular Sarathi Cultural Durga Puja - [Video] BoldskyTamil.

=== 2018 ===
1. The best ambience and crowd management award went to Sarathi Socio Cultural Trust - Times of India, 22 October 2018.
2. This year’s puja will be a musical extravaganza - The Hindu, 15 October 2018.
3. Sarathi socio-cultural trust likes to open its Durga puja party, featuring a classic Kumartuli idol, with a bang. - Bangalore Mirror, 14 October 2018

=== 2016 ===
1. Sudipto Das, general secretary of Sarathi Socio Cultural Trust says: “This is the 14th year of the Pujo. The cultural programme is spread across five days from October 6 to 10 known as Sammad..." - The Hindu, 30 September 2016.

=== 2015 ===
1. As Sudipto Das, cultural secretary, Sarathi Socio Cultural Trust, Kormangala, put it: "Our theme is 'Bibidher Majhe Milan', that is 'Unity in Diversity'.The various cultural programmes will celebrate the essence of India, rather than just Bengali culture. We are calling it an Indian cultural extravaganza." - The Economic Times, 19 October 2015
2. "We want to be inclusive and celebrate Durga Puja as an Indian festival..." - The Hindu, 20 October 2015.
3. "This association is known for its vibrant celebrations" - The Hindu, 13 October 2015.

=== 2013 ===
1. In Koramangala, the pandal by Sarathi Cultural Association is more contemporary in terms of the crowd and the stalls. - Deccan Herald, 11 October 2013

=== 2012 ===
1. "We encourage all people, irrespective of community, to participate in the Puja," said Sudipto Das, a member of Sarathi. - Times of India
2. Nowadays, even the non-bengalis have joined in this celebration. - The New Indian Express
3. There are various fun-filled activities lined up, some of which include performances by Bengali pop artistes and bands along with a homemade food fiesta. - The Hindu
4. "We have been distributing free bhog everyday...,” says Alok Basu, the chairman of the Sarathi Socio-Cultural Trust. - Deccan Herald

=== 2011 ===
1. One of the oldest celebrations in the City happens in Koramangala and is conducted by Sarathi Socio-Cultural Trust. Says Sudipto Das, the secretary of the trust... - Deccan Herald

=== 2009 ===
1. “If (the) IT (sector) as such doesn’t pick up, it’s very tough for events to happen in Bangalore,” said Sudipto Das, who handles cultural events at the Sarathi Socio-Cultural Trust. - The Telegraph

=== 2008 ===
1. “These Pujas are a meeting ground for young people, many from the IT, banking and other sectors, who form the cream of Bangalore. That’s why UB gets involved in a major way,” says [Aloke] Basu. - The Telegraph
2. Sudipto [Das], member of Sarathi Socio Cultural Trust, Koramangala, said..., for one more time, the evening was again filled with dance and music shows and a gala dinner. - Times of India
3. Sarathi Socio Cultural Trust in Koramangala too had an unexpected crowd of almost 10,000 persons at Mangal Kalyan Mantapa.- Times of India
4. The Koramangala Sarathi puja will have rock bands... Boogie Boogie, a dance competition and fashion show, will be held on Tuesday... - Times of India
5. It’s also where a grand Durga puja is celebrated every year - The Telegraph
