= Ghayab Aya =

- Directed by: Ashok Talwar
- Original language: Hindi

Production
- Animator: Suddhasattwa Basu

Original release
- Network: DD National
- Release: July 1990

Ghayab Aya is an Indian animated television series. The series, made in 10 parts, was first shown on the National television network Doordarshan in 1990. The story revolved around the adventures of Ghayab the friendly always do- gooder 'Casper type' naughty ghost.

Ghayab Aya was directed by Ashok Talwar and animated by Suddhasattwa Basu, who first started his career in 1981 as a designer and an illustrator for the TARGET children's magazine.
