= Schweik in the Second World War =

Play by Bertolt Brecht

Schweyk in the Second World War (German: Schweyk im Zweiten Weltkrieg) is a play by German dramatist and poet Bertolt Brecht. It was written by Brecht in 1943 while in exile in California, and is a sequel to the 1923 novel The Good Soldier Švejk by Jaroslav Hašek.

== Background ==
Schweyk in the Second World War is set in Nazi-occupied Prague and on the Russian Front during World War II. In a summary written for potential composer Kurt Weill, it was written: "The Good Soldier Schweyk, after surviving the First World War, is still alive. Our story shows his successful efforts to survive the Second as well. The new rulers have even more grandiose and all-embracing plans than the old, which makes it even harder for today's Little Man to remain more or less alive." Hanns Eisler, ultimately, became Brecht's chief musical collaborator for the work.

== Plot ==
As Schweyk is forced into war, he manages to survive while overcoming dangerous situations in Gestapo Headquarters, a military prison, and a Voluntary Labor Service. The ending finds Schweyk lost in a snowstorm near Stalingrad. He meets an equally lost and bewildered Hitler, whose path is blocked by snow, frozen corpses, the Soviet Army, and the German people. Finally, Hitler does a grotesque dance and disappears into the snow.

== TV production ==
Portuguese TV made an adaptation in 1975 IMDB link'

== Stage production ==
Schweyk in the Second World War was not staged during the lifetime of its writer Brecht, though it has been staged many times across the world in various languages, including Bengali, since its 1957 premiere in Warsaw.

The National Theatre in London staged a major revival directed by Richard Eyre with the same company of actors he had directed in his famous 1982 production of Guys and Dolls.

Red Theater Chicago staged it in October 2012 starring Kevin Cox. It was directed by Aaron Sawyer with original music composed by Michael Evans.

Forum Three Bangalore staged it for the first time in September 2014 in Bangalore and later at Auroville for an international audience. Directed by Ranjon Ghoshal, the original music recreating the Eastern European melodies of the 1940s was composed by Sudipto Das, with Sihi Kahi Chandru playing Schweyk.

== See also ==
- List of plays with anti-war themes
- "Das Lied vom Weib des Nazisoldaten". one of the poems in the play

== Bibliography ==
- Calabro, Tony, Bertolt Brecht's Art of Dissemblance, Longwood Academic, 1990
