= Paleolinguistics =

Study of ancient peoples by analyzing language

Paleolinguistics is a term used by some linguists for the study of the distant human past by linguistic means. For most historical linguists there is no separate field of paleolinguistics. Those who use the term are generally advocates of hypotheses not generally accepted by mainstream historical linguists, a group colloquially referred to as "long-rangers".

== Background ==
The controversial hypotheses in question fall into two categories. Some of them involve the application of standard historical linguistic methodology in ways that raise doubts as to the validity of the hypothesis. A good example of this sort is the Moscow school of Nostraticists, founded by Vladislav Illich-Svitych and including Aharon Dolgopolsky, Sergei Starostin, and Vitaly Shevoroshkin, who have argued for the existence of Nostratic, a language macrofamily including the Indo-European, Afro-Asiatic, Altaic, Dravidian, and Kartvelian language families and sometimes other languages. They have established regular phonological correspondences, observed morphological similarities, and reconstructed a proto-language in accordance with the accepted methodology. Nostratic is not generally accepted, in part because critics have doubts about the accuracy of the correspondences and reconstruction.

Other hypotheses are controversial because the methods used to support them are considered by mainstream historical linguists to be invalid in principle. Into that category fall proposals based on mass comparison, a technique in which relationships are postulated on basis of sets of words resembling each other in sound and meaning, without establishing phonological correspondences or carrying out a reconstruction.

Prominent examples are the work of Joseph Greenberg and Merritt Ruhlen. Most linguists reject that method as unable to distinguish similarities from common ancestry from those from borrowing or chance.

== See also ==
- Mass lexical comparison
- Moscow School of Comparative Linguistics
- Origins of language
- Proto-World language
- Superfamily (linguistics)

== Sources ==
- Blažek, V., et al. 2001. Paleolinguistics: The State of the Art and Science (Festschrift for Roger W. Wescott). Mother Tongue 6: 29-94.
- Campbell, Lyle. (1997). American Indian languages: The historical linguistics of Native America. New York: Oxford University Press. ISBN 0-19-509427-1.
- Campbell, Lyle (2004). Historical Linguistics: An Introduction (2nd ed.). Cambridge: MIT Press. ISBN 0-262-53267-0.
- Hegedűs, I., et al. (Ed.) 1997. Indo-European, Nostratic, and Beyond (Festschrift for Vitalij V. Shevoroshkin). Washington, DC: Institute for the Study of Man.
- Hock, Hans Henrich & Joseph, Brian D. (1996). Language History, Language Change, and Language Relationship: An Introduction to Historical and Comparative Linguistics. Berlin: Mouton de Gruyter.
- Kessler, Brett (2001). The Significance of Word Lists: Statistical Tests for Investigating Historical Connections Between Languages (2nd ed.). Stanford, CA: CSLI Publications.
- Matisoff, James. (1990) On Megalocomparison. Language, 66. 109-20
- Poser, William J. and Lyle Campbell (1992). Indo-european practice and historical methodology, Proceedings of the Eighteenth Annual Meeting of the Berkeley Linguistics Society, pp. 214–236.
- Renfrew, Colin, and Daniel Nettle. (Ed.) 1999. Nostratic: Examining a Linguistic Macrofamily. Cambridge, UK: McDonald Institute for Archaeological Research.
- Ringe, Donald. (1992). "On calculating the factor of chance in language comparison". American Philosophical Society, Transactions, 82 (1), 1-110.
- Ruhlen, Merritt. 1994. The Origin of Language: Tracing the Evolution of the Mother Tongue. New York: John Wiley & Sons.
- Shevoroshkin, V. (Ed.) 1992. Nostratic, Dene-Caucasian, Austric and Amerind. Bochum: Brockmeyer.
- Swadesh, Morris. 1971. The Origin and Diversification of Language. Ed. by Joel Sherzer. Chicago/New York: Aldine Atherton.
- Trask, Larry (1996). Historical Linguistics (2nd ed.). London: Edward Arnold. ISBN 0-340-60758-0.
