= Jug Suraiya =

Indian newspaper editor

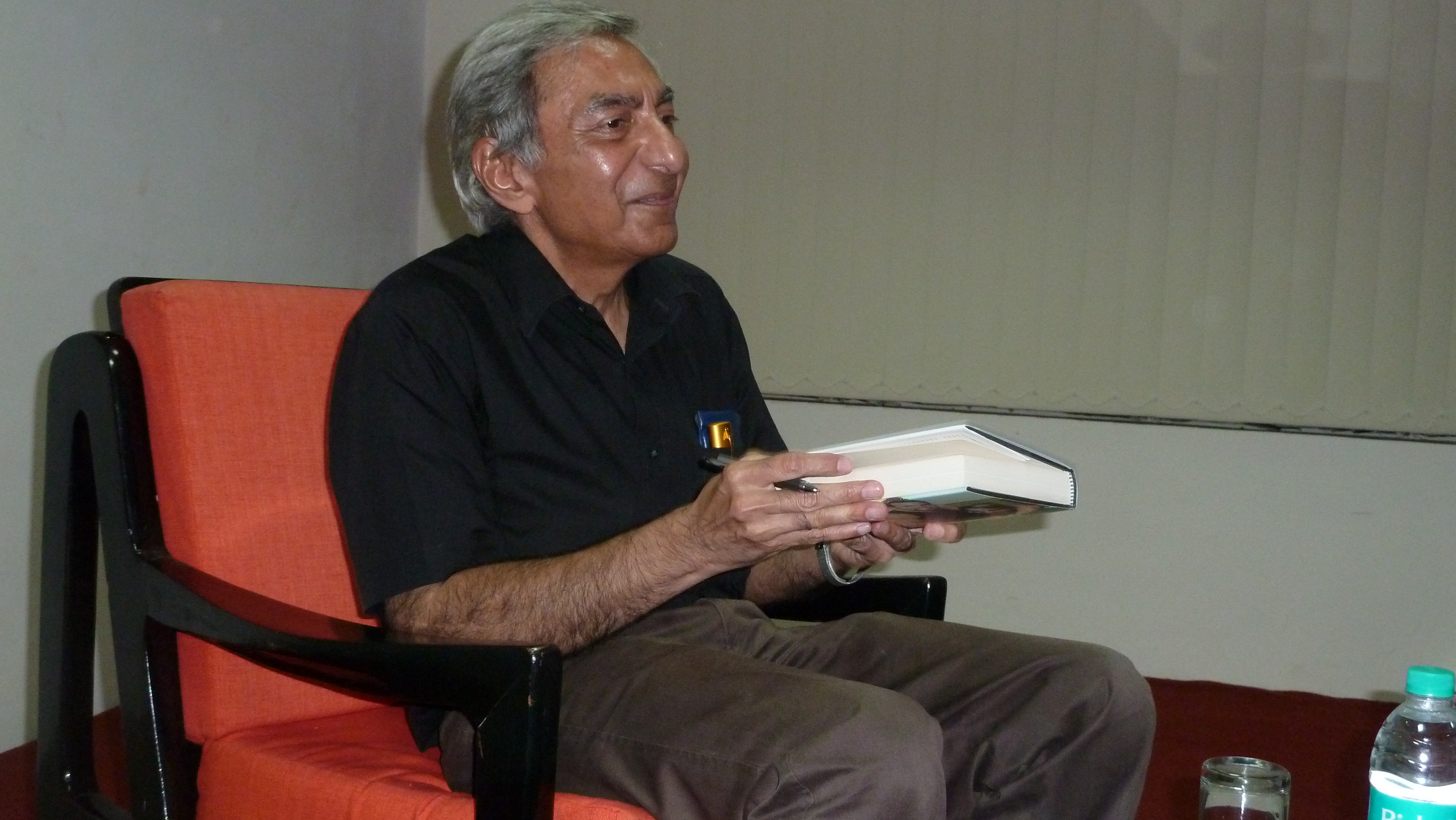
- Education: La Martiniere Calcutta
- Occupations: Author, columnist

Jug Suraiya is an Indian journalist, author and columnist. He is best known as a satirist and columnist. Suraiya is a former editorial opinion editor and associate editor of the Times of India.

He is Delhi-based and schooled at La Martiniere Calcutta.

Internationally, he has written for The New York Review of Books, The Guardian (UK), Geo Magazine (Germany), Merian Magazine (Germany), The Far Eastern Economic Review (Hong Kong) and The Khaleej Times (Dubai UAE).

He is the author of 15 published books including a novel, two anthologies of short fiction, an anthology of travel writing, compilations of his satirical columns, a collection of essays on philosophical and political themes, a memoir of his career in journalism which touches upon the many changes that the profession has seen in India, and compilations of his cartoons created in collaboration with two illustrators.

A cartoon strip which he authored as a tribute to Charles M. Schulz, the creator of Peanuts, is displayed in the Charles M. Schulz Museum in Santa Rosa, California, United States.

== Columns ==
Suraiya writes two columns for the print edition of the Times of India. Of the two, Jugular Vein appears on Friday, and the second column Second Opinion appears every Wednesday. He also writes the script for two cartoon strips for Times of India, "Duniya ke Neta" and "Like that only". Jugular Vein is a satirical column that skewers everything, from the mundane to the serious. Its everyday focus and travel writing are also well known. There is frequent referencing to his wife as 'Bunny' in the articles.

Khushwant Singh has referred to Suraiya as "our own Art Buchwald". He is a writer distinguished for satire, wit and humour in his writings. Suraiya reflects on his personal reminiscences while drawing astounding parallels of some of the most famous personalities or gently touching at the absurdities which have become part and parcel of our lives.

== Cartoon strip ==
Post 9/11 Suraiya created a daily cartoon in the Times of India called Dubyaman with Manav Paul content head Times of India & Neelabh Banerjee, staff artist of The Times of India. It is loosely based on US President George W. Bush. According to Suraiya, he first thought of Dubyaman as a kind of a superman type hero who would signify the military might and muscle of America, but unfortunately has the brain of a George W. Bush, thereby making him more dangerous. The idea was to show that far from being some sort of a superpatriot, this man could be a potential danger not just to his supposed enemies, but also to his friends and to his own country's people. Slowly but steadily Dubyaman has acquired local flavour with Jug frequently making fun of Indian politicians.

Awards and honours

In 1983 he became the first Asian writer to win the Grand Prize for Travel Writing awarded by the Pacific Area Travel Association. The Grand Prize had been established 34 years prior to his winning it. He was invited to Acapulco, Mexico, to receive the Prize.

His short story, "The Badger", about an ageing schoolteacher, was shortlisted for The Commonwealth Prize for short fiction. It was made required reading for several years for all students of the Indian School Leaving Certificate. The story was subsequently made into a short film which has been screened at various international cine festivals.

In 2017 the Shreyas Award, the Rotary Club of India's highest award, was conferred upon him for his contributions to journalism and literature.

In 2020 he was awarded a knighthood by the president of the Italian Republic: Cavaliere dell'Ordine della Stella d'Italia (Knight of the Order of the Star of Italy).

He became the first Asian to win the Pacific Asia Travel Association gold award in 1983, for travel writing.

== Anthologies of his humorous writings and short stories ==
- Delhi Belly and other misadventures in the middle kingdom (1991)
- A Taste for the Jugular (1994)
- The Great Indian Bores (1996)
- Juggling Act (2005)
- A Tika for Jung Bahadur (2006)

== Books on travel and non-fiction ==
- The interview and other stories (1971)
- Homecoming (1977)
- Rickshaw Ragtime (1993)
- Word Is a Four-Letter Word: Selected Writings (1994)
- A Portable India (co authored with Anurag Mathur) (1994)
- Mind Matters (2003)
- Where on Earth Am I? – Confusions of a Travelling Man (2004)
- Calcutta: A City Remembered (2005)

== Life ==
Suraiya spent a good chunk of his life in Kolkata, where he grew up. He worked with The Statesman and its youth magazine the Junior Statesman, before serving as associate editor. He later moved to New Delhi, joined The Times of India, and lived in Vasant Kunj for a while before relocating to Gurgaon, where he currently lives with his wife Bunny.
