= Timeline of Abu Dhabi =

The following is a timeline of the history of the city of Abu Dhabi, United Arab Emirates.

== Prior to 20th century ==
- 1761 – Drinking water found on Abu Dhabi Island; settlement begins.
- 1790s – Abu Dhabi Island becomes "capital of the Bani Yas tribal confederation."
- 1818 – Shakhbut bin Dhiyab Al Nahyan and Tahnun bin Shakhbut Al Nahyan become rulers of Abu Dhabi.
- 1855 – Zayed bin Khalifa Al Nahyan becomes ruler of Abu Dhabi.

== 20th century ==
- 1928 – Shakhbut bin Sultan Al Nahyan becomes ruler of Abu Dhabi.
- 1939 – Abu Dhabi Petroleum Company established.
- 1948 – Dubai-Abu Dhabi border dispute.
- 1952 – Population: 4,000 in sheikdom (estimate).
- 1955 – The city's first airfield opens
- 1958 – Oil discovered in Abu Dhabi.
- 1962 – Oil exportation begins from offshore Das Island.
- 1963 – The Trucial rulers sign an agreement to issue a decree to abolish slavery.
- 1966 – Zayed bin Sultan Al Nahyan becomes ruler of Abu Dhabi.
- 1968 – Population: 46,375.
- 1969 – Al Bateen Airport begins operating on Abu Dhabi Island.
- 1971
  - December: Abu Dhabi becomes part of the newly formed United Arab Emirates.
  - Abu Dhabi National Oil Company established.
- 1972 – Al-Ittihad newspaper in publication.
- 1974 – Al Fajr newspaper begins publication.
- 1980
  - E 11 road (Dubai-Abu Dhabi) completed.
  - Central Bank of the United Arab Emirates headquartered in Abu Dhabi.
  - Population: 242,975.
- 1981 – Regional Gulf Cooperation Council meets in Abu Dhabi.
- 1982 – Zayed International Airport (then called Abu Dhabi International Airport) established on the mainland.
- 1991 – July: "Bank of Credit and Commerce International collapses. Abu Dhabi's ruling family owns a 77.4% share."
- 1993 – International Defence Exhibition begins.
- 1994 – Baynunah Hilton Tower built.
- 2000 – Abu Dhabi Securities Exchange established.

== 21st century ==
- 2001 – Abu Dhabi Mall and Marina Mall in business.
- 2002 – Population: 527,000.
- 2003 – July: Etihad Airways founded
- 2004 – Khalifa bin Zayed Al Nahyan becomes ruler of Abu Dhabi.
- 2005 – Emirates Palace hotel in business.
- 2007
  - Sheikh Zayed Grand Mosque built.
  - Abu Dhabi National Exhibition Centre opens.
- 2008 – Abu Dhabi Bus service begins.
- 2009
  - Abu Dhabi Grand Prix car race begins.
  - Construction begins on Abu Dhabi National Oil Company headquarters and Saadiyat Island's Louvre Abu Dhabi.
- 2010
  - Sky Tower built.
  - Ferrari World amusement park in business on Yas Island.
- 2011
  - Sheikh Zayed Bridge, Capital Gate, and Etihad Towers built.
  - Guggenheim Abu Dhabi construction begins on Saadiyat Island.
- 2012 – The Landmark built (tallest in city).
- 2014
  - Yas Mall in business.
  - New York University Saadiyat Island campus built.
- 2019 – Pope Francis becomes the first Pope ever to visit the Arabian Peninsula and the UAE, specifically Abu Dhabi, from

February 3–5.

- 2020 – On August 31, at around 10:15 a.m., a gas explosion occurred in a restaurant in a building along Rashid Bin Saeed Street (Airport Road). At least three persons were killed and several others were injured. A misalignment in the gas container fittings following refuelling was found to have caused the accident.
- 2022
  - 2022 Abu Dhabi attack
  - Mohamed bin Zayed Al Nahyan becomes ruler of Abu Dhabi.
- 2023
  - Airport Terminal A is open for public

== See also ==
- List of rulers of the Emirate of Abu Dhabi
- Timelines of other cities in United Arab Emirates: Dubai

== Bibliography ==
- John Gordon Lorimer (1908). "Dhabi (Abu)". Gazetteer of the Persian Gulf. Calcutta. hdl:2027/uc1.31158009868174 – via HathiTrust.
- "Abu Thabi". Persian Gulf Pilot. Washington DC: Government Printing Office. 1920.
- "United Arab Emirates: Abu Dhabi", Arab Gulf States, Lonely Planet, 1993, p. 295+, ISBN 9780864421203, OL 8314448M
- Yasser Elradition, Modernity and Urban Development, ed. (2008). "Cities of sand and fog: Abu Dhabi's global ambitions". The Evolving Arab City: Tradition, Modernity and Urban Development. Routledge. ISBN 978-1-134-12821-1.
