= Architecture of the United Arab Emirates =

Burj Khalifa, the world's tallest building

The architecture of the United Arab Emirates has undergone dramatic transformation in recent decades, from operating as a collection of fishing villages to a global business hub known for its innovation and dynamism. Between the 1960s and 1970s, architecture in the United Arab Emirates (UAE) remained solely traditional, with narrow alleys and windtower houses still in use, reflective of a strong Bedouin heritage. Architecture is influenced by elements of Islamic, Arabian and Persian culture.

In 1959, Sheikh Rashid bin Saeed Al Maktoum, the former ruler of Dubai, commissioned British architect John R Harris to create the city's first town plan. Soon afterwards, Harris began completing commissions for low- and mid-rise buildings that expressed the city's modern ambitions. These buildings often included facades that kept the buildings partially cooled with by taking advantage of shadow. Harris's tower for Dubai World Trade Centre was the tallest building he proposed for the city, and it was the city's tallest tower for many years. Completed in 1979, it utilized various techniques to reduce energy consumption in the tower, including a double facade that receded glazing behind an outer facade. Architectural glazing, nevertheless, would prevail in Dubai and in Abu Dhabi. Around the same time as the World Trade Centre was completed, other architects began making more expressive use of exposed glass curtain facades, for example the BCCI bank buildings designed by the British firm Fitzroy Robinson and Partners. Glass curtain walls are now a prevailing architectural element throughout the Persian Gulf. In less commercial areas, Emirati architecture continues to heavily reflects the custom and traditional lifestyles of the native people. While these building materials might be considered simple, that does not mean that these buildings are also highly reliant about artificial cooling and other environmentally unsound practices.

== Traditional influences ==
Traditional architecture in the United Arab Emirates was heavily influenced by the desert landscape, culture, lifestyle and available building materials. The Bedouin, a nomadic Arab tribe who traditionally live in the desert were well known for using palm frond shelters, known as arish in the summer months. Frames for arish houses were often made with mangrove poles, imported from East Africa. In colder months, a move towards using animal skin shelters would be made. The Bedouin tent was a useful and adaptable structure often made of sheep wool, camels’ hair or goat hair by the women of the tribe. Such structures were called Bait al Sha’ar, meaning ‘House of Hair’. Other materials such as a mixture of seashells and limestone were used as building resources in the late 19th and early 20th centuries.

The nomadic nature of the Bedouin tribe demanded the need for light disposable materials that could be found along coastal lines. In contrast, permanent houses inland were constructed with a mud mixture formed into bricks, strengthened using stones bonded together with a mixture of red clay and manure. The geographical context of a tribe or group determined the type of materials that were used in the construction of buildings, meaning that most structures were made of materials drawn from the surrounding environment. These ranged from coral, mud and stone through to palm fronds and animal hair. The harsh climate of the United Arab Emirates created a need for ventilation due to high temperature periods of the year. This resulted in the introduction of Iranian windtowers, known as barjeels. These vertical shafts allow for a downward flow of cool air and a distribution of water to become available at the bottom of the structure, allowing for the inside temperature of the building to be cooled.

== Ancient architecture ==
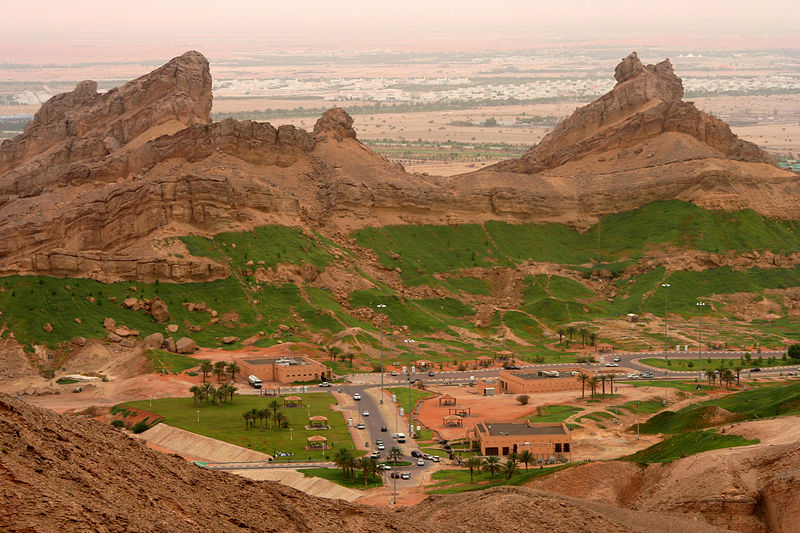
A view over Green Mubazzarah in Al-Ain, at the base of Jebel Hafeet (Mount Hafeet)

While human settlement in the United Arab Emirates can be traced back to the Stone Age (6,000–3,200 BC), it was not until the Bronze Age (3,200–1,300 BC) that larger establishments began to form. Such settlements were developed in inland oases and coastal areas, populated by farmers, animal herders and fisherman. The first recorded large settlement was the town of Al Ain, through which inhabitants would export agricultural products through the port of Umm Al Nar, located off Abu Dhabi Island. This was a permanent establishment made up of well-constructed buildings built from cut and dressed stone, complete with circular tower-like tombs. Evidence from these sites indicates a strong trade evolving from pottery production and the export of copper, particularly between these settlements and surrounding civilisations such as Mesopotamia.

Cross section of a qanat

A water irrigation system known as qanat emerged in the Iron Age (1,300–300 BC). This system provided a relatively constant water supply all year round by taking advantage of underground water supplies, leading to a change in settlement patterns as groups would follow the route of the water source. Up until the mid 20th century (marking the beginning of Western attention to the area), most building fell into five categories: religious, residential, markets, public, and defensive buildings. Buildings that were constructed up until then remained within traditional styles. Unlike other styles of Islamic and Persian architecture, there is little ornamentation found in traditional architecture of the UAE. Only a small number of mosques offer any form of ornamentation, reflecting the lack of resources at hand and general reliance on simple but effective structures.

== Globalisation ==
The onset of the Globalisation era of the 1980s saw the United Arab Emirates become one of the most developed countries in the Persian Gulf region. The country saw a major economic boost with transforming into a commodity based economy, with shipments of oil and natural gas accounting for 40% of total exports and 38% of GDP. In the past two decades, significant effort has been made to diversify the economy and reduce dependency on oil revenues, with huge investments in tourism, financial and construction sectors. Since the late 1980s, architecture of the United Arab Emirates has become renowned for its urban image, becoming highly westernised but still retaining elements of traditional Emirati culture.

Architecture of the state is heavily influenced by the inflow of wealth that has resulted from the economic boom of recent decades. Nonetheless, recent urban and commercial development in all major cities of the UAE continued to be influenced by Islamic architecture, giving these global metropoles a distinct Arabic background.

== Major cities ==
=== Dubai ===
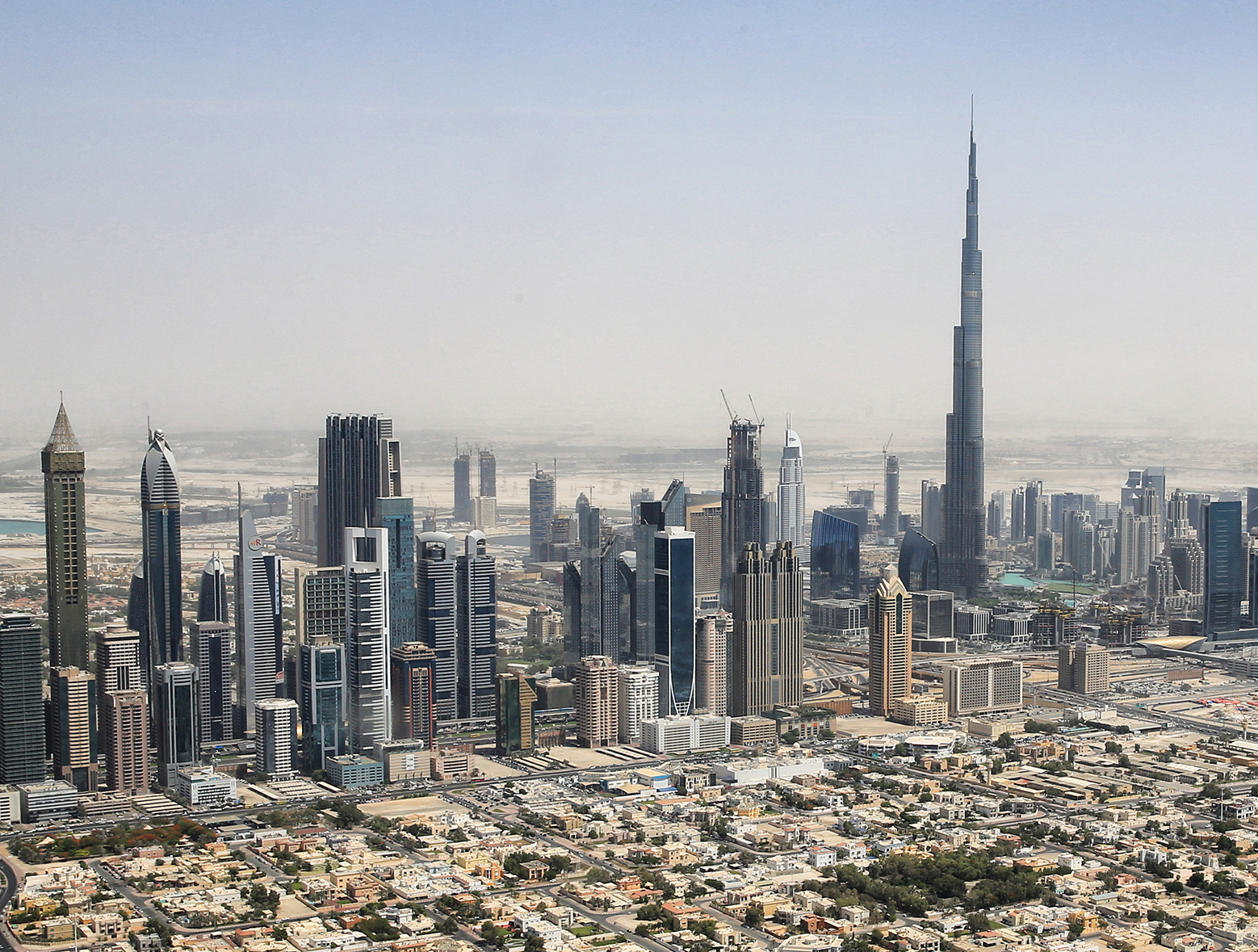
Skyline of Downtown Dubai with Burj Khalifa

Early construction after the expansion of Dubai as a global city did not make explicit references to traditional Islamic architecture. In the late 1980s and early 1990s, glass towers became prominent in the city of Dubai, all of which required enormous amounts of electricity to keep cool. It was also in the 1980s, when there are clear references to Islamic architecture in briefs to architects. Recently, builders and architects have been more forthcomign in their design proposal of consideration of both Arabic heritage and environmental concerns. These expressions have been seen by some as evidence that there has more harmonious development overseen by Dubai’s rulers in the last 20 years. Efficient heat resistant materials are increasingly used in construction, combined with traditional Arabic designs. This can be seen in the buildings for which Dubai has attracted worldwide attention for, including the Burj Khalifa and Burj Al Arab. These, however, are showpiece projects and account for a small percentage of what actually gets built in the city.

The Burj Khalifa was inaugurated in January 2010, unveiled as the world’s tallest freestanding structure at 829.8 m (2.722 ft.). The structure is host to several mixed facilities, including commercial shops, offices, entertainment venues and residential sectors. In designing the building, the lead architect Adrian Smith undertook elements of traditional Islamic architecture, which uses stepped ascending spirals. This reflected elements of Islamic design while creating a strategic shape to ensure the mass of the building reduces with height, allowing for a stronger and more fortified structure. The building supposedly ascends from a flower shaped based, imitating the Hymenocallis, a white lily native to the surrounding desert.

The Burj Al Arab (translated to ‘Arabian tower’) was designed by architect Tom Wright to resemble a J-class yacht. The structure is made of a steel frame exterior wrapped around a concrete tower, with white Teflon encased fibreglass forming the ‘sail’. The Burj Al Arab stands on an artificial island 280 m (918.6 ft.) from Jumeirah Beach. The architect claimed that "the client wanted a building that would become a symbolic statement for Dubai, similar to Sydney with its Opera House, London with Big Ben or Paris with the Eiffel Tower. It needed to be a building that would become synonymous with the name of the city." The building opened in 1999 after five years of construction.

=== Abu Dhabi ===
In 1967, Abu Dhabi's architecture was planned under the guidance of Zayed bin Sultan Al Nahyan by Japanese architect Katsuhiko Takahashi. In areas of high population density, there is a large amount of medium and high rise buildings, amongst the city’s notable skyscrapers; the Etihad towers, the National Bank of Abu Dhabi headquarters, the Abu Dhabi Investment Authority Tower, the Aldar headquarters and the Emirates Palace, heavily influenced by its Arab heritage.

Abu Dhabi is home to several supertall skyscrapers. The development of tall buildings has been encouraged in the Abu Dhabi Plan 2030. The expansion of Abu Dhabi’s central business district continues to grow, with several skyscraper buildings under construction in the city. Some of the tallest buildings in Abu Dhabi include the Central Market Residential Tower at 328m (1,253.28 ft.), The Landmark at 324m (1,062.99 ft.) and the Sky Tower at 310 m (1017.06 ft.).

In contrast to the city's modernised skyscrapers, the Sheikh Zayed Grand Mosque remains one of the most prominent sites of contemporary UAE society. Its design and construction began in November 1996, with the aim of ‘uniting the world’, and involved artisans and materials from several countries, including Germany, Italy, Turkey, Iran, Morocco, Pakistan, the UAE, Greece, New Zealand and China. he mosque incorporates materials such as marble, stone, gold, ceramics and crystals, selected for their durability. The structure reflects the globalised nature of modern architecture while incorporating traditional elements of Arabic design.

== Rural Emirati architecture ==
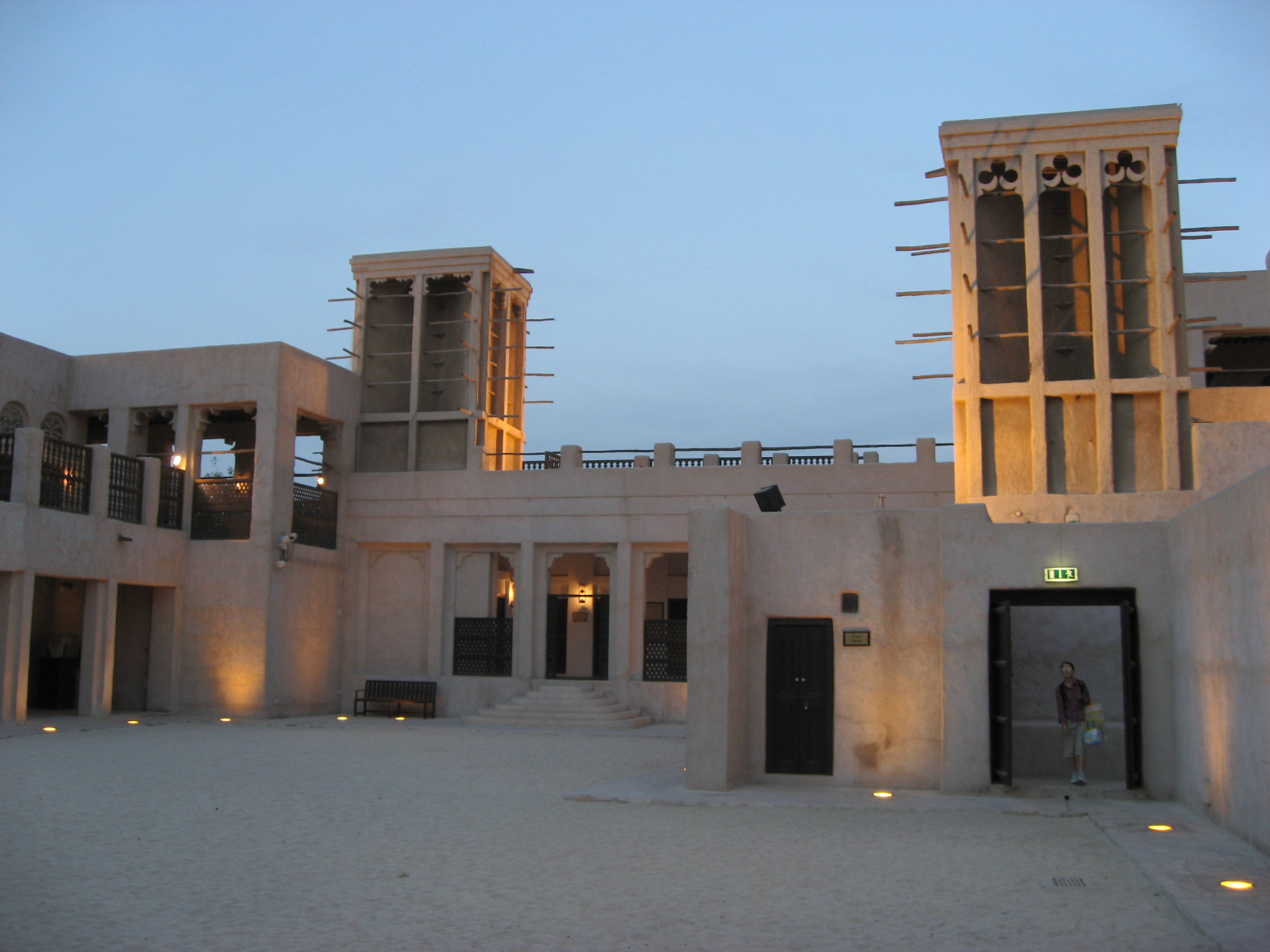
Traditional house with windtowers in Dubai

In less commercialised areas of the United Arab Emirates, there are buildings which appear traditional, including reconstructed barjeel structures, originally from Iran and designed to bring cooler and cleaner air into interiors. These structures today, however, are nearly all ornamental and non-functioning. Reconstructed examples of the UAE’s traditional vernacular architecture developed in the 18th and 19th centuries are to be find in older, historical centres of each city. For example, Dubai's historic Bastakiya district (today renamed Al Fahidi) was largely demolished in the 1970s and 1980s, but reconstructions welcome visitors today. No one lives there. Such settlements can give the visitor the impression of earlier social and environmental conditions; buildings, including market places, mosques and fortified buildings, are somewhat reflective of the interconnected influences between a group’s culture and trade. Ultimately, however, these buildings are outfitted with contemporary life's expected utilities, including air-conditioning.

To this day, current-day building materials are made to appear as if they were made with mud and coral. However, they are all built with reinforced concrete. The usage of stone guss, a lime mixture derived from seashells and a chalk and water paste was characteristic of more permanent inland houses. Today it such materials are imitated with a outer layer coating. The structure of such houses is indicative of privacy and ventilation as central needs of the population, with high walls and limited visibility into buildings. Courtyard housing features are still utilised, designed to allow public interaction between male members of the household while preserving dignity and privacy of female family members. This is an example of traditional societal standards being well preserved through architectural fixtures in less commercialised areas. Rural and village architecture in the UAE is solely based on protecting occupants from the harsh environmental elements and climate of the geographical area. At a basic level, protection is needed from high temperatures, high humidity, high solar radiation, dust storms and desert winds. This is heavily reflected in the traditional and current use of courtyard houses and arish (houses built of palm tree leaves).

== Sustainable Architecture and Regulations ==
Architectural development across the United Arab Emirates has incorporated municipal sustainability codes and green building frameworks. These frameworks draw on traditional climate-responsive designs, such as the historical ''barjeel'' (wind tower) used for natural ventilation, while modern regulatory bodies establish energy and resource efficiency requirements.

An example is the Barjeel green building regulations, established by the Ras Al Khaimah Municipality as part of the emirate's energy and efficiency strategy. Applicable to new construction across residential, commercial, industrial, and public sectors, the regulations outline performance tiers based on project scale.

Key regulatory elements of the framework include:

- Building Envelope Performance: Thermal insulation standards for exterior walls and roofs, alongside Solar Heat Gain Coefficient (SHGC) thresholds for glazed elements.
- HVAC Efficiency: Requirements for heating, ventilation, and air conditioning systems, including localized thermostatic controls.
- Water Conservation: Specifications for low-flow plumbing fixtures, irrigation systems, and water recycling provisions.
- Renewable Energy : Structural provisions, such as designated solar zones, to support rooftop photovoltaic (PV) installations.

== See also ==
- Culture of the United Arab Emirates
- Islamic architecture
- Persian architecture
