= 2018 Abu Dhabi Tour =

Cycling race

2018 UCI World Tour, race 3 of 37

Race details
- Dates: 21–25 February 2018
- Stages: 5
- Distance: 687.6 km (427.3 mi)
- Winning time: 16h 00' 11"

Results
Jersey awarded to the overall winner	Winner	Alejandro Valverde (ESP)	(Movistar Team)
	Second	Wilco Kelderman (NED)	(Team Sunweb)
	Third	Miguel Ángel López (COL)	(Astana)
Jersey awarded to the points classification winner	Points	Elia Viviani (ITA)	(Quick-Step Floors)
Jersey awarded to the young rider classification winner	Young rider	Miguel Ángel López (COL)	(Astana)
Jersey awarded to the sprints classification winner	Sprints	Nikolay Trusov (RUS)	(Gazprom–RusVelo)
	Team	Bora–Hansgrohe	

The 2018 Abu Dhabi Tour was a road cycling stage race that took place between 21 and 25 February 2018 in Abu Dhabi. It was the fourth edition of the Abu Dhabi Tour and the third event of the 2018 UCI World Tour.

The race was won on the final day by the Movistar Team's Alejandro Valverde, from Spain, winning the stage finish up to Jebel Hafeet. Valverde finished 17 seconds clear of Dutch rider Wilco Kelderman from Team Sunweb, while the podium was completed by Colombia's Miguel Ángel López (Astana), a further 12 seconds in arrears. The performance by López was also enough for him to win the young rider classification.

In the race's other classifications, Italy's Elia Viviani – riding for Quick-Step Floors – was the winner of the green jersey for the points classification, winning the second stage during the race, while Gazprom–RusVelo's Nikolay Trusov from Russia won the intermediate sprints classification and its accompanying black jersey, having led the standings from start to finish. The teams classification was won by Bora–Hansgrohe, having placed Rafał Majka, Davide Formolo and Emanuel Buchmann within the top-ten placings overall.

== Teams ==
As the race was only added to the UCI World Tour calendar in 2017, all UCI WorldTeams were invited to the race, but not obligated to compete in the race. As such, seventeen of the eighteen WorldTeams – with the exception of FDJ – competed in the race, up one on 2017. Three UCI Professional Continental teams competed as well, completing the 20-team peloton.

UCI WorldTeams

- AG2R La Mondiale
- Astana
- Bahrain–Merida
- BMC Racing Team
- Bora–Hansgrohe
- Team Dimension Data
- EF Education First–Drapac p/b Cannondale
- Team Katusha–Alpecin
- LottoNL–Jumbo
- Lotto–Soudal
- Mitchelton–Scott
- Movistar Team
- Quick-Step Floors
- Team Sky
- Team Sunweb
- Trek–Segafredo
- UAE Team Emirates

Professional Continental teams

- Bardiani–CSF
- Gazprom–RusVelo
- Team Novo Nordisk

== Route ==
The route for the 2018 edition of the race was released on 23 January 2018. The race was extended from four stages to five, with the addition of an individual time trial for the first time; as well as this, the summit finish of Jebel Hafeet ends the race instead of a circuit race at the Yas Marina motor racing circuit.

Stage schedule
Stage	Date	Route	Distance	Type	Winner
1	21 February	Madinat Zayed to Madinat Zayed	189 km (117 mi)	Flat stage	Alexander Kristoff (NOR)
2	22 February	Yas Mall to Yas Beach	154 km (96 mi)	Flat stage	Elia Viviani (ITA)
3	23 February	Nation Towers to Big Flag, Al Marina	133 km (83 mi)	Flat stage	Phil Bauhaus (GER)
4	24 February	Al Maryah Island to Al Maryah Island	12.6 km (8 mi)	Individual time trial	Rohan Dennis (AUS)
5	25 February	Qasr Al-Muwaiji to Jebel Hafeet	199 km (124 mi)	Medium-mountain stage	Alejandro Valverde (ESP)

== Stages ==
=== Stage 1 ===
21 February 2018 — Madinat Zayed to Madinat Zayed, 189 km (117 mi)

Result of Stage 1
Rank	Rider	Team	Time
1	Alexander Kristoff (NOR)	UAE Team Emirates	4h 48' 24"
2	Andrea Guardini (ITA)	Bardiani–CSF	+ 0"
3	Caleb Ewan (AUS)	Mitchelton–Scott	+ 0"
4	Elia Viviani (ITA)	Quick-Step Floors	+ 0"
5	Daniel McLay (GBR)	EF Education First–Drapac p/b Cannondale	+ 0"
6	Niccolò Bonifazio (ITA)	Bahrain–Merida	+ 0"
7	Michael Bresciani (ITA)	Bardiani–CSF	+ 0"
8	Danny van Poppel (NED)	LottoNL–Jumbo	+ 0"
9	Rudy Barbier (FRA)	AG2R La Mondiale	+ 0"
10	André Greipel (GER)	Lotto–Soudal	+ 0"

General classification after Stage 1
Rank	Rider	Team	Time
1	Alexander Kristoff (NOR)	UAE Team Emirates	4h 48' 14"
2	Andrea Guardini (ITA)	Bardiani–CSF	+ 4"
3	Caleb Ewan (AUS)	Mitchelton–Scott	+ 6"
4	Nikolay Trusov (RUS)	Gazprom–RusVelo	+ 6"
5	Vincenzo Albanese (ITA)	Bardiani–CSF	+ 6"
6	Toms Skujiņš (LAT)	Trek–Segafredo	+ 7"
7	Damiano Caruso (ITA)	BMC Racing Team	+ 9"
8	Elia Viviani (ITA)	Quick-Step Floors	+ 10"
9	Daniel McLay (GBR)	EF Education First–Drapac p/b Cannondale	+ 10"
10	Niccolò Bonifazio (ITA)	Bahrain–Merida	+ 10"

=== Stage 2 ===
22 February 2018 — Yas Mall to Yas Beach, 154 km (96 mi)

Result of Stage 2
Rank	Rider	Team	Time
1	Elia Viviani (ITA)	Quick-Step Floors	3h 15' 30"
2	Danny van Poppel (NED)	LottoNL–Jumbo	+ 0"
3	Pascal Ackermann (GER)	Bora–Hansgrohe	+ 0"
4	Kristoffer Halvorsen (NOR)	Team Sky	+ 0"
5	Caleb Ewan (AUS)	Mitchelton–Scott	+ 0"
6	Phil Bauhaus (GER)	Team Sunweb	+ 0"
7	Alexander Kristoff (NOR)	UAE Team Emirates	+ 0"
8	Niccolò Bonifazio (ITA)	Bahrain–Merida	+ 0"
9	Rudy Barbier (FRA)	AG2R La Mondiale	+ 0"
10	Mark Renshaw (AUS)	Team Dimension Data	+ 0"

General classification after Stage 2
Rank	Rider	Team	Time
1	Elia Viviani (ITA)	Quick-Step Floors	8h 03' 44"
2	Alexander Kristoff (NOR)	UAE Team Emirates	+ 0"
3	Danny van Poppel (NED)	LottoNL–Jumbo	+ 4"
4	Caleb Ewan (AUS)	Mitchelton–Scott	+ 6"
5	Pascal Ackermann (GER)	Bora–Hansgrohe	+ 6"
6	Alejandro Valverde (ESP)	Movistar Team	+ 7"
7	Toms Skujiņš (LAT)	Trek–Segafredo	+ 7"
8	Alessandro Tonelli (ITA)	Bardiani–CSF	+ 7"
9	Mark Renshaw (AUS)	Team Dimension Data	+ 8"
10	José Joaquín Rojas (ESP)	Movistar Team	+ 9"

=== Stage 3 ===
23 February 2018 — Nation Towers to Big Flag, Al Marina, 133 km (83 mi)

Result of Stage 3
Rank	Rider	Team	Time
1	Phil Bauhaus (GER)	Team Sunweb	3h 02' 55"
2	Marcel Kittel (GER)	Team Katusha–Alpecin	+ 0"
3	Pascal Ackermann (GER)	Bora–Hansgrohe	+ 0"
4	Elia Viviani (ITA)	Quick-Step Floors	+ 0"
5	Caleb Ewan (AUS)	Mitchelton–Scott	+ 0"
6	André Greipel (GER)	Lotto–Soudal	+ 0"
7	Rudy Barbier (FRA)	AG2R La Mondiale	+ 0"
8	Alexander Kristoff (NOR)	UAE Team Emirates	+ 0"
9	Danny van Poppel (NED)	LottoNL–Jumbo	+ 0"
10	Andrea Guardini (ITA)	Bardiani–CSF	+ 0"

General classification after Stage 3
Rank	Rider	Team	Time
1	Elia Viviani (ITA)	Quick-Step Floors	11h 06' 36"
2	Alexander Kristoff (NOR)	UAE Team Emirates	+ 3"
3	Phil Bauhaus (GER)	Team Sunweb	+ 3"
4	Pascal Ackermann (GER)	Bora–Hansgrohe	+ 5"
5	Danny van Poppel (NED)	LottoNL–Jumbo	+ 7"
6	Marcel Kittel (GER)	Team Katusha–Alpecin	+ 7"
7	Caleb Ewan (AUS)	Mitchelton–Scott	+ 9"
8	Alejandro Valverde (ESP)	Movistar Team	+ 10"
9	Toms Skujiņš (LAT)	Trek–Segafredo	+ 10"
10	Alessandro Tonelli (ITA)	Bardiani–CSF	+ 10"

=== Stage 4 ===
24 February 2018 — Al Maryah Island to Al Maryah Island, 12.6 km (8 mi), individual time trial (ITT)

Result of Stage 4
Rank	Rider	Team	Time
1	Rohan Dennis (AUS)	BMC Racing Team	14' 21"
2	Jonathan Castroviejo (ESP)	Team Sky	+ 14"
3	Miles Scotson (AUS)	BMC Racing Team	+ 16"
4	Jos van Emden (NED)	LottoNL–Jumbo	+ 16"
5	Wilco Kelderman (NED)	Team Sunweb	+ 16"
6	Brent Bookwalter (USA)	BMC Racing Team	+ 17"
7	Nikias Arndt (GER)	Team Sunweb	+ 22"
8	Patrick Bevin (NZL)	BMC Racing Team	+ 23"
9	Alejandro Valverde (ESP)	Movistar Team	+ 27"
10	Alex Dowsett (GBR)	Team Katusha–Alpecin	+ 29"

General classification after Stage 4
Rank	Rider	Team	Time
1	Rohan Dennis (AUS)	BMC Racing Team	11h 21' 10"
2	Jonathan Castroviejo (ESP)	Team Sky	+ 14"
3	Miles Scotson (AUS)	BMC Racing Team	+ 16"
4	Jos van Emden (NED)	LottoNL–Jumbo	+ 16"
5	Wilco Kelderman (NED)	Team Sunweb	+ 16"
6	Brent Bookwalter (USA)	BMC Racing Team	+ 17"
7	Patrick Bevin (NZL)	BMC Racing Team	+ 23"
8	Alejandro Valverde (ESP)	Movistar Team	+ 24"
9	Tom Dumoulin (NED)	Team Sunweb	+ 31"
10	Julian Alaphilippe (FRA)	Quick-Step Floors	+ 34"

=== Stage 5 ===
25 February 2018 — Qasr Al Muwaiji to Jebel Hafeet, 199 km (124 mi)

Result of Stage 5
Rank	Rider	Team	Time
1	Alejandro Valverde (ESP)	Movistar Team	4h 38' 47"
2	Miguel Ángel López (COL)	Astana	+ 0"
3	Julian Alaphilippe (FRA)	Quick-Step Floors	+ 15"
4	Rafał Majka (POL)	Bora–Hansgrohe	+ 15"
5	Wilco Kelderman (NED)	Team Sunweb	+ 15"
6	Davide Formolo (ITA)	Bora–Hansgrohe	+ 37"
7	Niklas Eg (DEN)	Trek–Segafredo	+ 47"
8	Diego Ulissi (ITA)	UAE Team Emirates	+ 55"
9	Rui Costa (POR)	UAE Team Emirates	+ 55"
10	Antwan Tolhoek (NED)	LottoNL–Jumbo	+ 55"

Final general classification
Rank	Rider	Team	Time
1	Alejandro Valverde (ESP)	Movistar Team	16h 00' 11"
2	Wilco Kelderman (NED)	Team Sunweb	+ 17"
3	Miguel Ángel López (COL)	Astana	+ 29"
4	Julian Alaphilippe (FRA)	Quick-Step Floors	+ 31"
5	Rafał Majka (POL)	Bora–Hansgrohe	+ 45"
6	Davide Formolo (ITA)	Bora–Hansgrohe	+ 1' 13"
7	Diego Ulissi (ITA)	UAE Team Emirates	+ 1' 18"
8	Rui Costa (POR)	UAE Team Emirates	+ 1' 28"
9	Rohan Dennis (AUS)	BMC Racing Team	+ 1' 29"
10	Emanuel Buchmann (GER)	Bora–Hansgrohe	+ 1' 37"

== Classification leadership table ==
In the 2018 Abu Dhabi Tour, four different jerseys were awarded. For the general classification, calculated by adding each cyclist's finishing times on each stage, and allowing time bonuses for the first three finishers at intermediate sprints and at the finish of mass-start stages, the leader received a red jersey. This classification was considered the most important of the 2018 Abu Dhabi Tour, and the winner of the classification was considered the winner of the race.

Additionally, there was a points classification, which awarded a green jersey. In the points classification, cyclists received points for finishing in the top 10 in a stage. For winning a stage, a rider earned 20 points, with 16 for second, 12 for third, 9 for fourth, 7 for fifth, 5 for sixth with a point fewer per place down to a single point for 10th place. Points towards the classification could also be accrued – on an 8–5–3–1 basis – at intermediate sprint points during each stage, with the exception of the individual time trial; these intermediate sprints also offered bonus seconds towards the general classification. There was also a sprints classification for the points awarded at the aforementioned intermediate sprints, where the leadership of which was marked by a black jersey.

The fourth jersey represented the young rider classification, marked by a white jersey. This was decided in the same way as the general classification, but only riders born after 1 January 1993 were eligible to be ranked in the classification. There was also a classification for teams, in which the times of the best three cyclists per team on each stage were added together; the leading team at the end of the race was the team with the lowest total time.

Stage	Winner	General classification	Points classification	Young rider classification	Sprints classification	Team classification
1	Alexander Kristoff	Alexander Kristoff	Alexander Kristoff	Caleb Ewan	Nikolay Trusov	Bardiani–CSF
2	Elia Viviani	Elia Viviani	Elia Viviani	Danny van Poppel	Nikolay Trusov	Quick-Step Floors
3	Phil Bauhaus	Elia Viviani	Elia Viviani	Phil Bauhaus	Nikolay Trusov	Bahrain–Merida
4	Rohan Dennis	Rohan Dennis	Elia Viviani	Miles Scotson	Nikolay Trusov	BMC Racing Team
5	Alejandro Valverde	Alejandro Valverde	Elia Viviani	Miguel Ángel López	Nikolay Trusov	Bora–Hansgrohe
Final		Alejandro Valverde	Elia Viviani	Miguel Ángel López	Nikolay Trusov	Bora–Hansgrohe
