= Silver Tower =

Silver Tower may refer to:

- Silver Tower (Abu Dhabi)
- Silver Tower, novel by author Dale Brown
- Silver Towers
- Silberturm, also known as Silver Tower
