= List of tallest buildings in Abu Dhabi =

This list of tallest buildings in Abu Dhabi ranks skyscrapers in Abu Dhabi, United Arab Emirates by height.

== Tallest buildings ==
The list ranks Abu Dhabi skyscrapers based on standard height measurement. This includes architectural details and spires, but does not include antenna masts. Although not falling into the category of buildings, Abu Dhabi also claimed the world record for the highest free-standing flagpole in the world between 2001 and 2003. The flagpole stands at a height of 122 metres (400 ft).

Rank	Name	Image	Height metres / ft	Floors	Year
1	Burj Mohammed Bin Rashid		381 metres (1,250 ft)	88	2014
2	ADNOC Headquarters		342 metres (1,122 ft)	65	2015
3	The Landmark		324 metres (1,063 ft)	72	2013
4	Sky Tower		312 metres (1,024 ft)	80	2010
5	Etihad Tower 2		305 metres (1,001 ft)	77	2011
6	ADDAX Tower		282 metres (928 ft)	62	2015
7	Trust Tower		278 metres (916 ft)	60	2013
8	Etihad Tower 1		277 metres (909 ft)	70	2011
9	Nation Towers - Tower A		268 metres (879 ft)	65	2011
10	Etihad Tower 3		260 metres (853 ft)	62	2011
11	Sun Tower		247 metres (810 ft)	65	2010
12	The Gate Residential Tower 1		240 metres (787 ft)	66	2013
12	The Gate Residential Tower 2		240 metres (787 ft)	66	2013
12	The Gate Residential Tower 3		240 metres (787 ft)	66	2013
15	Etihad Tower 4		234 metres (768 ft)	61	2011
16	Nation Towers - Tower B		233 metres (764 ft)	52	2013
17	The Leaf		228 metres (748 ft)	60	2018
18	Etihad Tower 5		217 metres (712 ft)	56	2011
19	Regent Emirates Pearl		215 metres (707 ft)	47	2015
20	Sama Tower		215 metres (705 ft)	50	2013
21	Capital Plaza Residential Towers		210 metres (689 ft)	51	2011
22	Horizon Tower A		205 metres (673 ft)	63	2017
23	Capital Plaza Office Tower		200 metres (656 ft)	40	2011
24	SEBA Tower (Al Ain Tower)		194 metres (636 ft)	50	2011
25	Saraya Tower 1		185 metres (607 ft)	46	2017
26	Mubadala Tower		185 metres (607 ft)	37	2013

== Timeline of tallest building ==
Name	Years as tallest	Height metres / ft	Floors	References
Novotel Center Hotel	1976–1990	N/A	20	
Silver Tower	1990–1993	120 metres (394 ft)	30	
Le Royal Méridien Hotel	1993–1994	121 metres (397 ft)	32	
Baynunah Hilton Tower Hotel	1994–2002	165 metres (541 ft)	40	
National Bank of Abu Dhabi Headquarters	2002–2006	173 metres (568 ft) (excluding spire)	33	
Abu Dhabi Investment Authority Tower	2006–2010	185 metres (607 ft)	40	
Sky Tower	2010-2011	312 metres (1,024 ft)	80	
The Landmark	2011–2014	324 metres (1,063 ft)	72	
Burj Mohammed Bin Rashid	2014–Present	382 metres (1,253 ft)	92	

== See also ==
- List of tallest buildings in Asia
- List of tallest buildings in the United Arab Emirates
