= Sri Sendayan Mosque =

Mosque in Negeri Sembilan, Malaysia

- Masjid Sri Sendayan مسجد سري سنداين
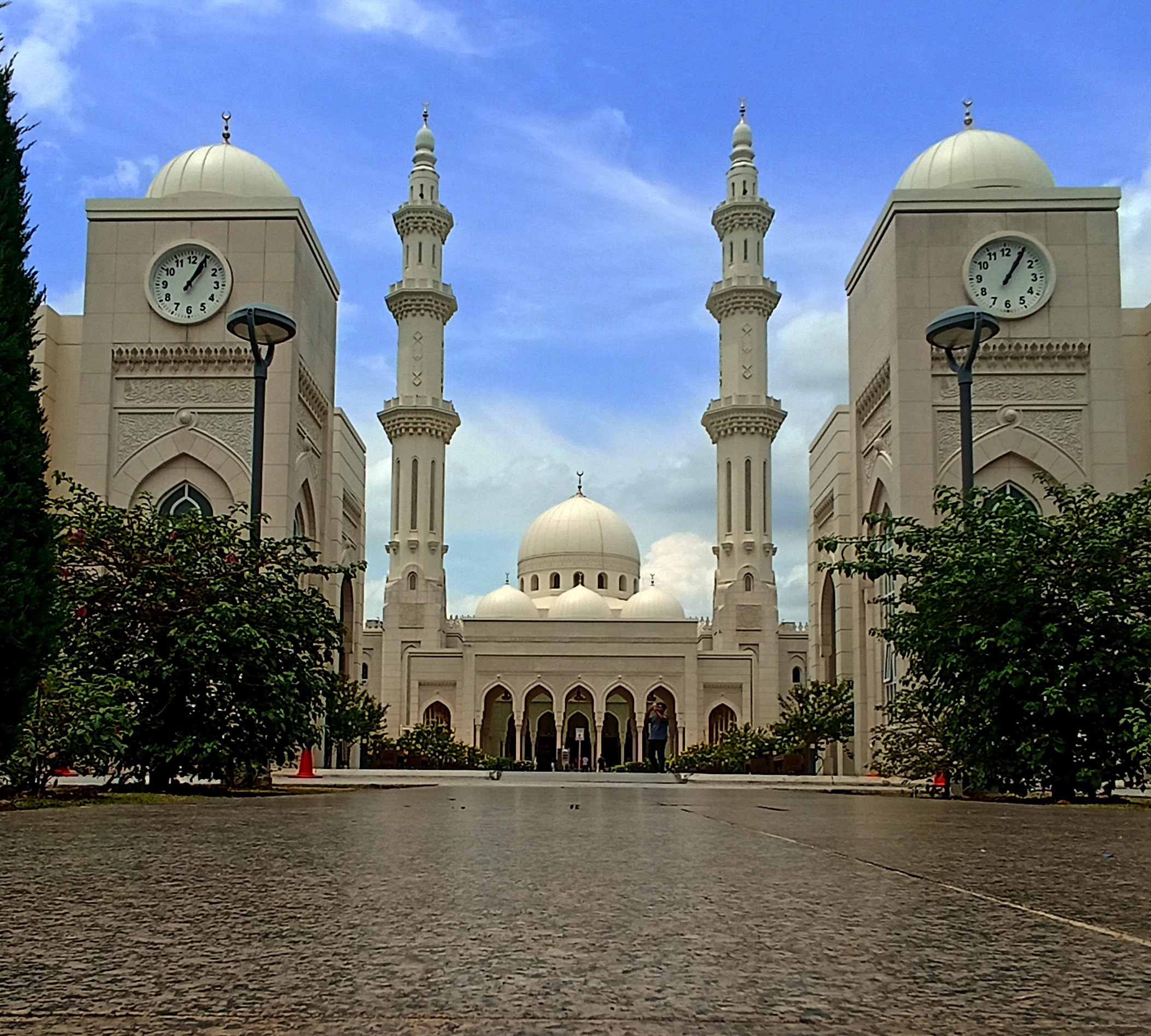
- Façade of the mosque

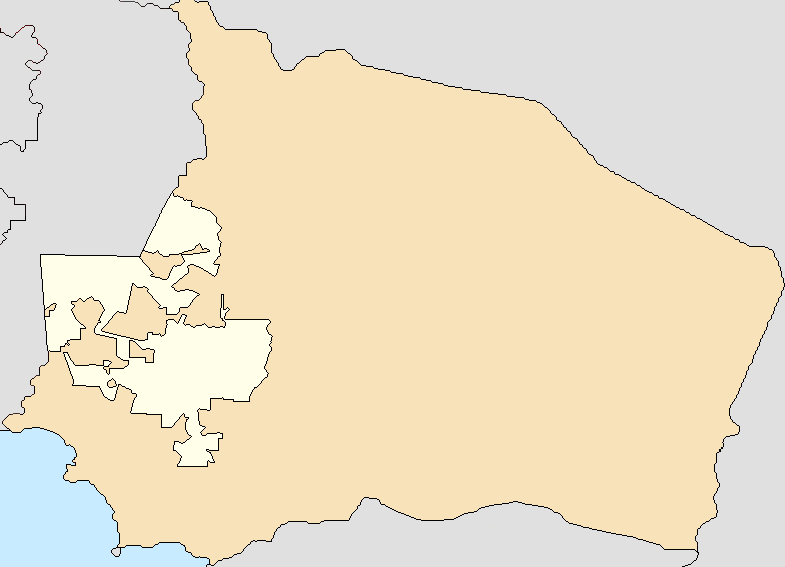
- Location within Seremban

Religion
- Affiliation: Islam
- Branch/tradition: Shafi'i Sunni
- Ecclesiastical or organisational status: Mosque
- Status: Active

Location
- Location: Bandar Sri Sendayan, Seremban, Negeri Sembilan, Malaysia
- Coordinates: 2.6852900°N 101.8439591°E

Architecture
- Architect: Zailan Yusop
- Type: Mosque architecture
- Style: Abbasid, Mamluk, Umayyad and Ottoman
- Founder: Rashid Hussain
- Funded by: Rashid Hussain
- Groundbreaking: 2015
- Completed: 2019
- Construction cost: ≈ RM100 million

Specifications
- Capacity: 5,000
- Dome: 4
- Minaret: 2
- Site area: 4.5 ha

Website
- https://www.masjidsrisendayan.com.my/

The Sri Sendayan Mosque (Malay: Masjid Sri Sendayan) is a mosque located in Bandar Sri Sendayan, Seremban, Negeri Sembilan, Malaysia. It is located 15 kilometres (9.3 mi) southwest of Seremban's city centre. It is the state's largest mosque, able to accommodate up to 5,000 worshippers.

The mosque is donated by Rashid Hussain, the founder of RHB Bank. Construction of the mosque commenced in 2015 and inaugurated on 20 September 2019.

== Description ==
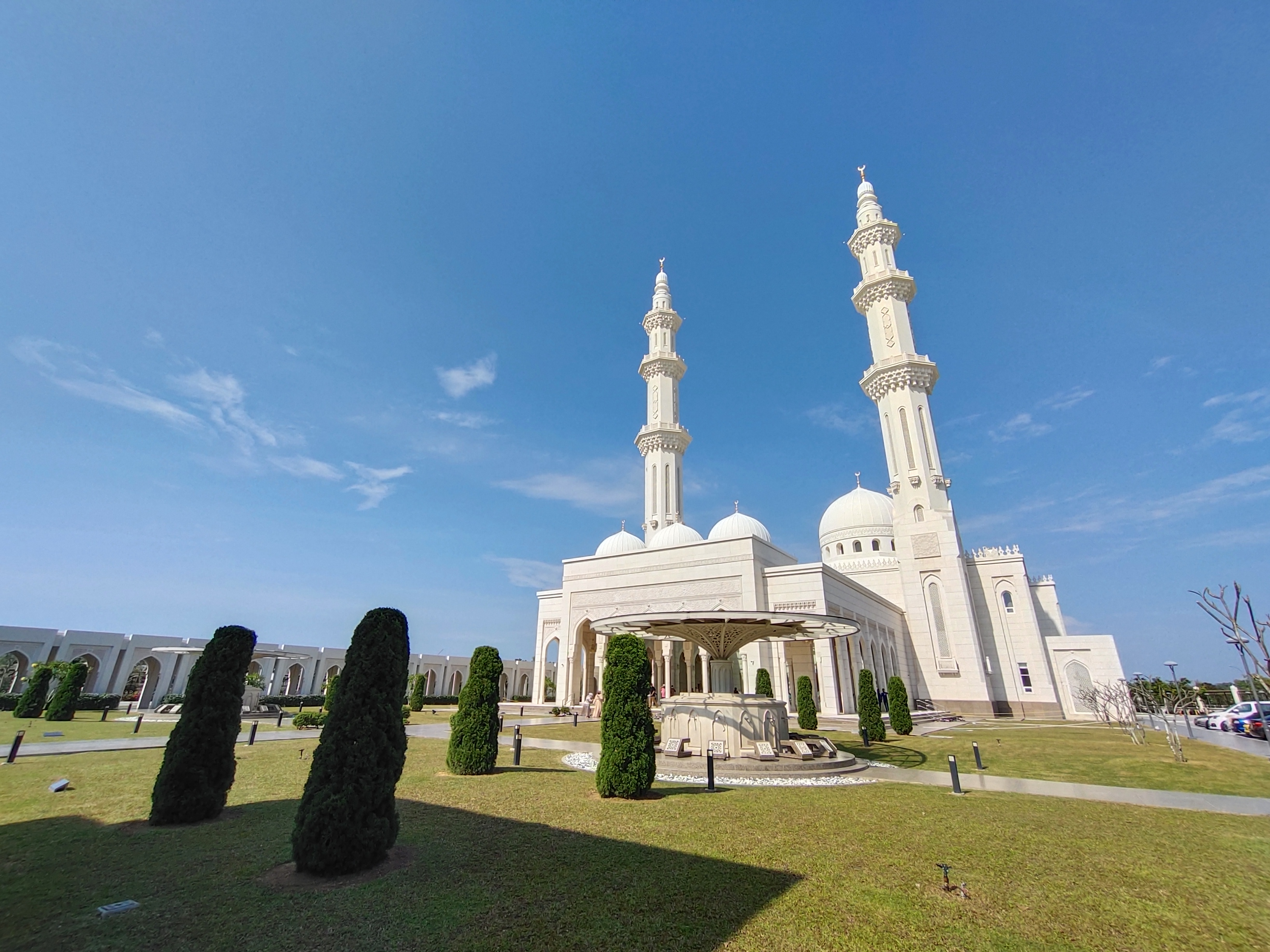
The mosque in 2022

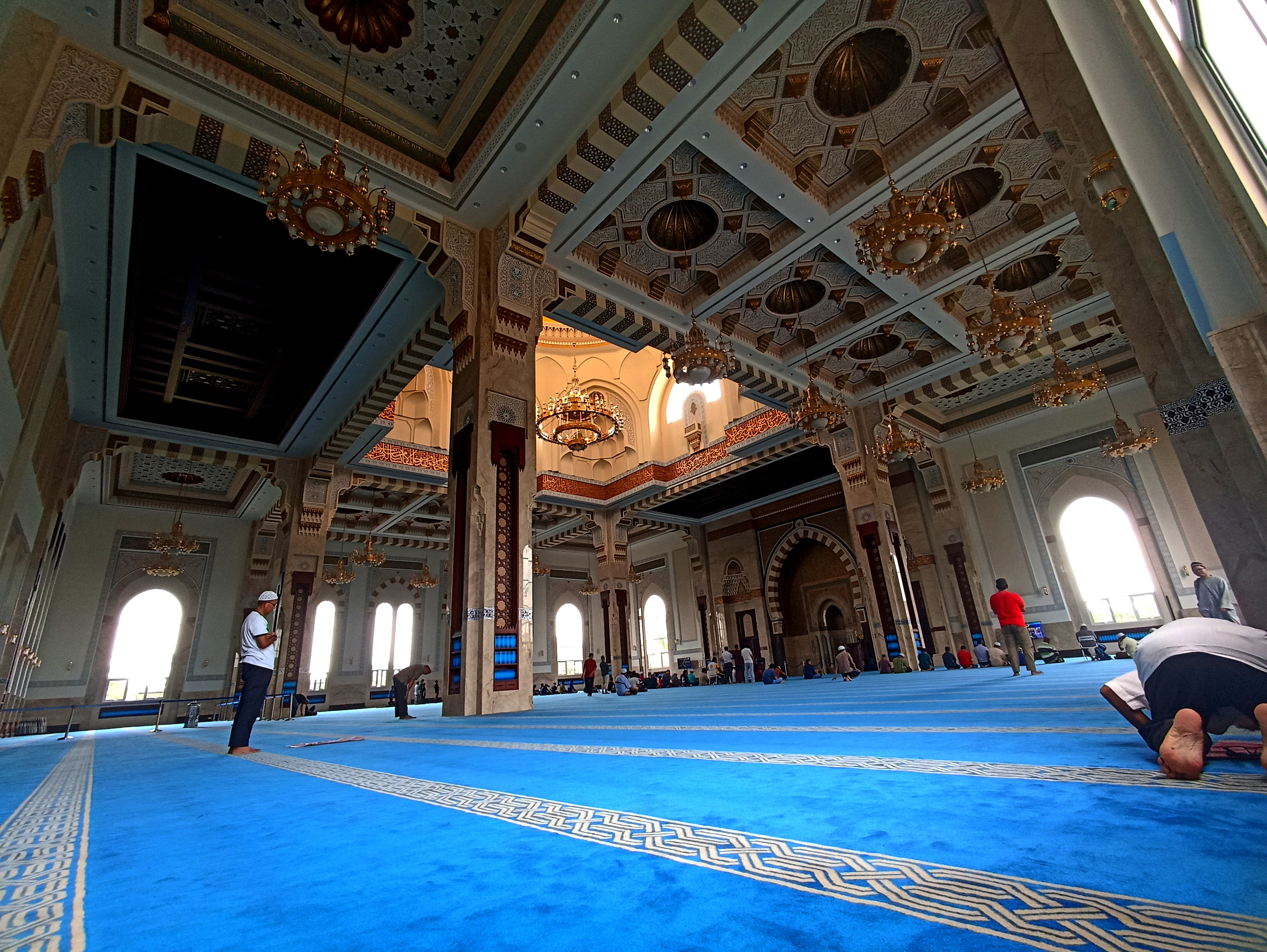
Main prayer hall

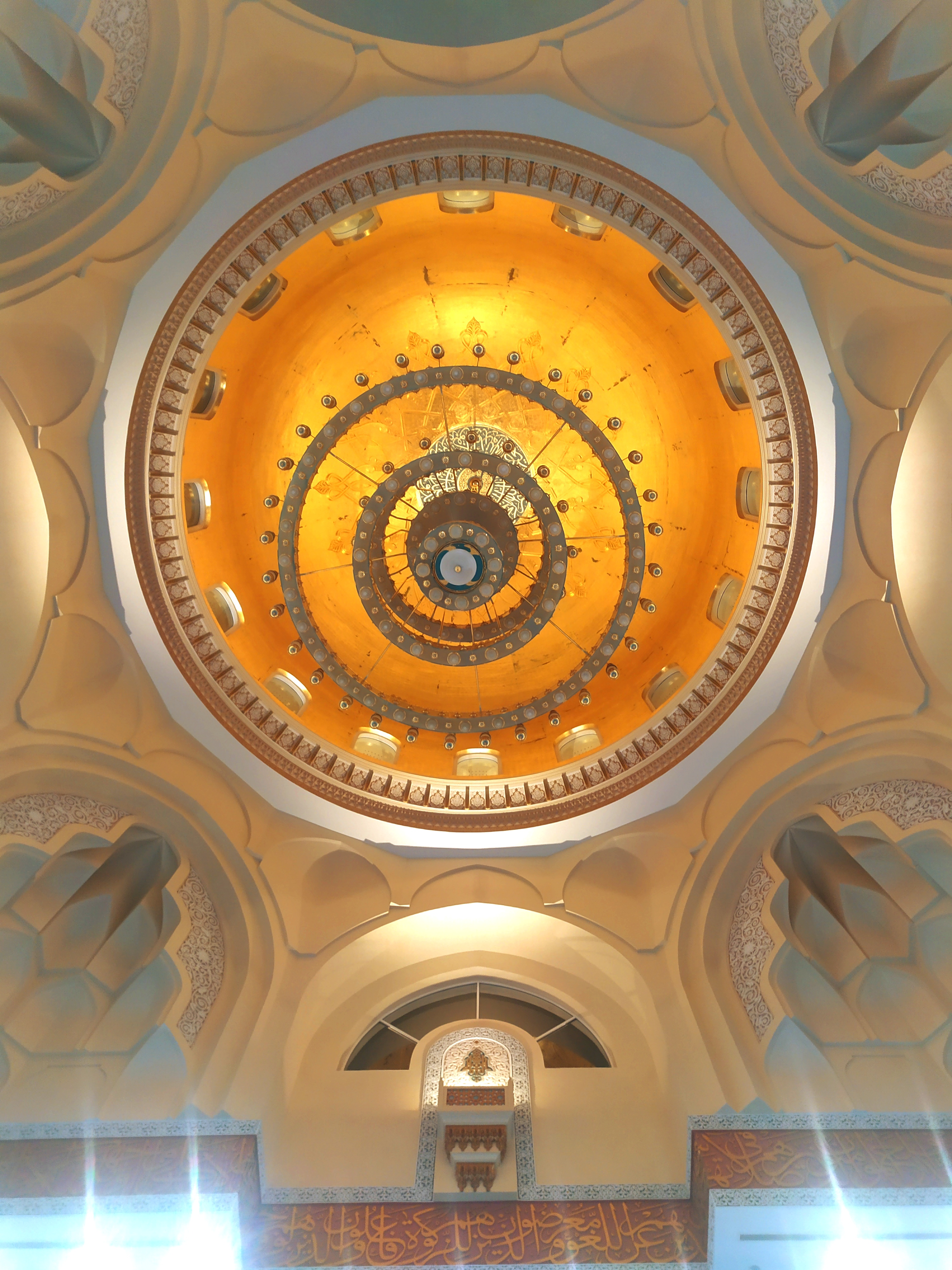
The main dome's gilded underside with chandelier

The Sri Sendayan Mosque is built on a 4.5-hectare site, and consists of three prayer halls, all of them are fully carpeted and air-conditioned, and a portico with an atrium. The main prayer hall can hold up to 3,000 people, while both the secondary and women's prayer halls (the latter is in the upper floor) can accommodate 800 people. Among the facilities provided in the mosque include conference rooms, a multipurpose hall, an administrative office, dining hall, mortuary management room and six units of residence for the mosque personnel.

=== Architecture ===
Zailan Yusop, a Kuala Lumpur-based architect, is responsible for designing the mosque. It is noted for its artistic and elegant architecture, which is described as a blend between Abbasid and Mamluk with hints of Umayyad and Ottoman influences. The mosque's interior design is an amalgamation of Egyptian, Ottoman, Emirati, Moroccan and Chinese elements. It is hailed as one of Malaysia's most beautiful mosques, attracting both local and international tourists.

== Gallery ==
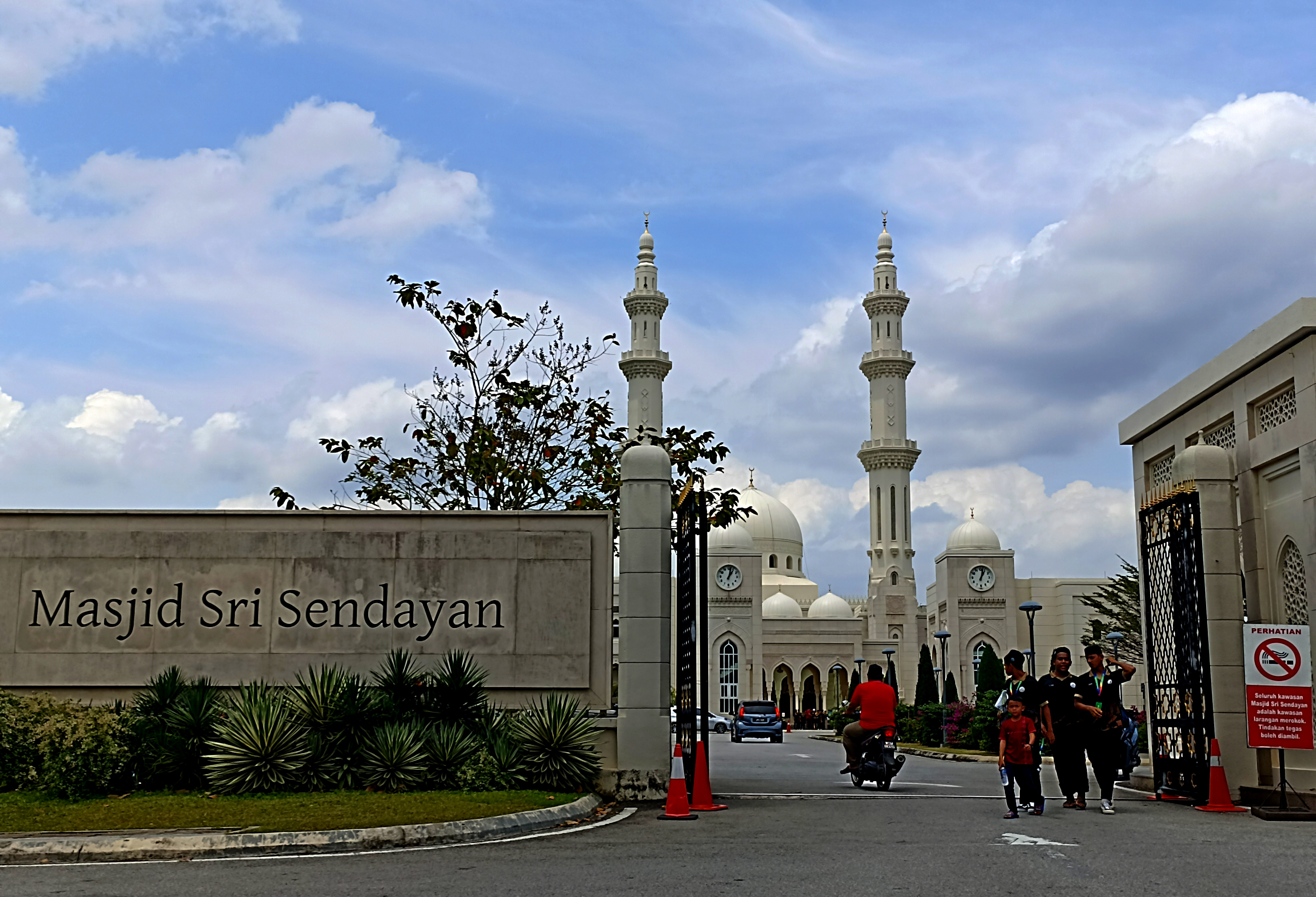
Main entrance

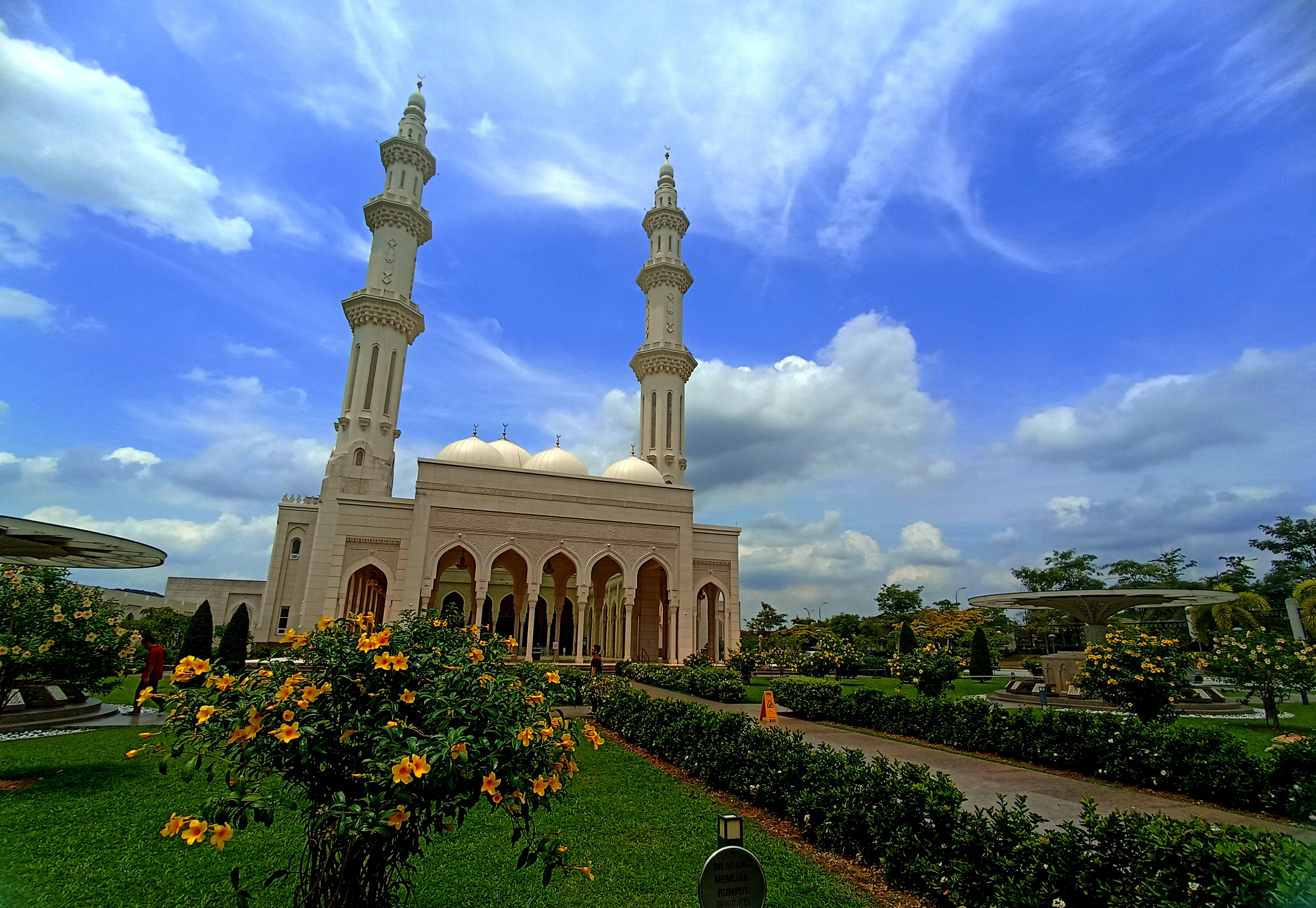
Mosque compound with blooming yellow allamanda plants

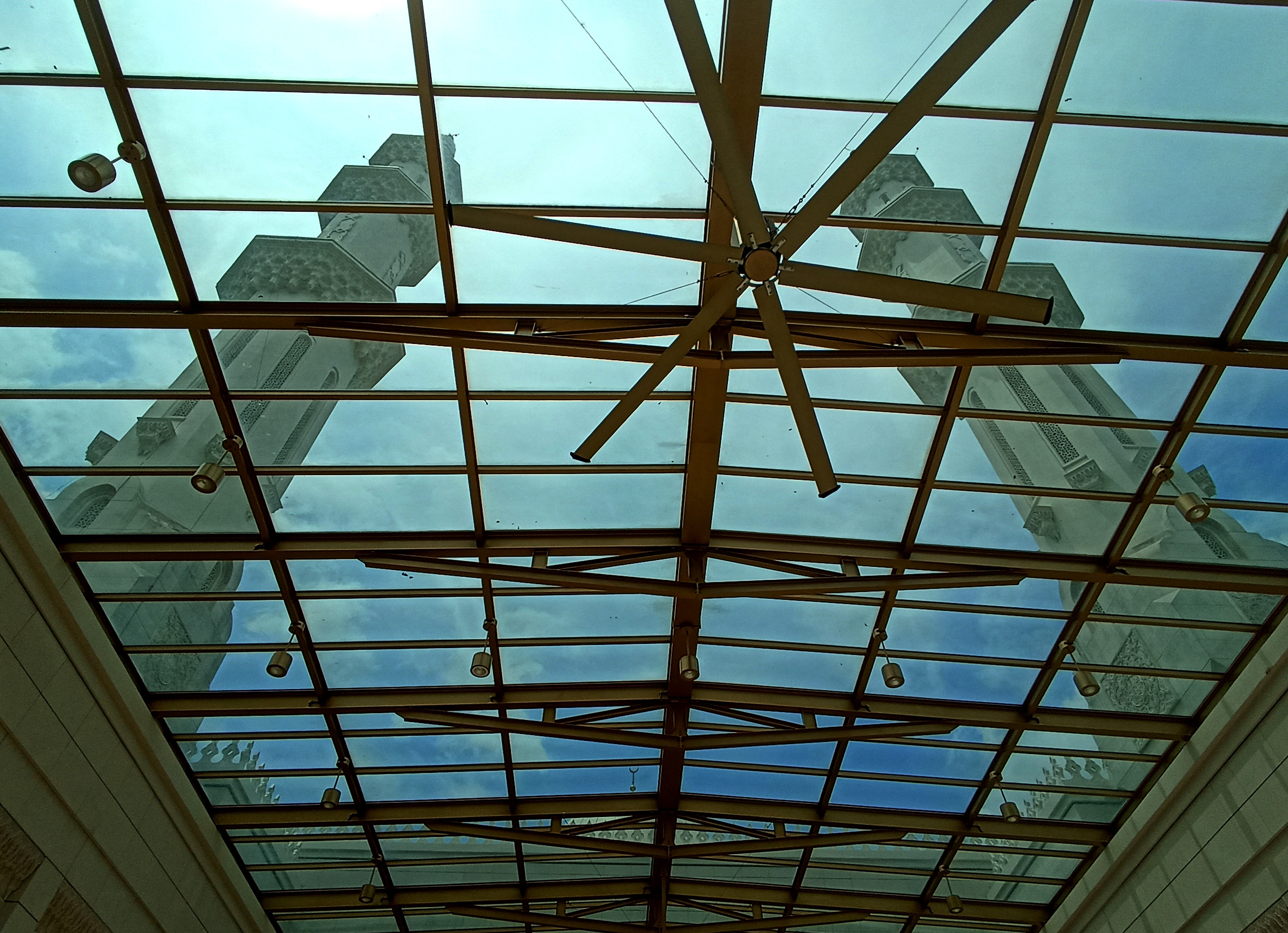
Atrium

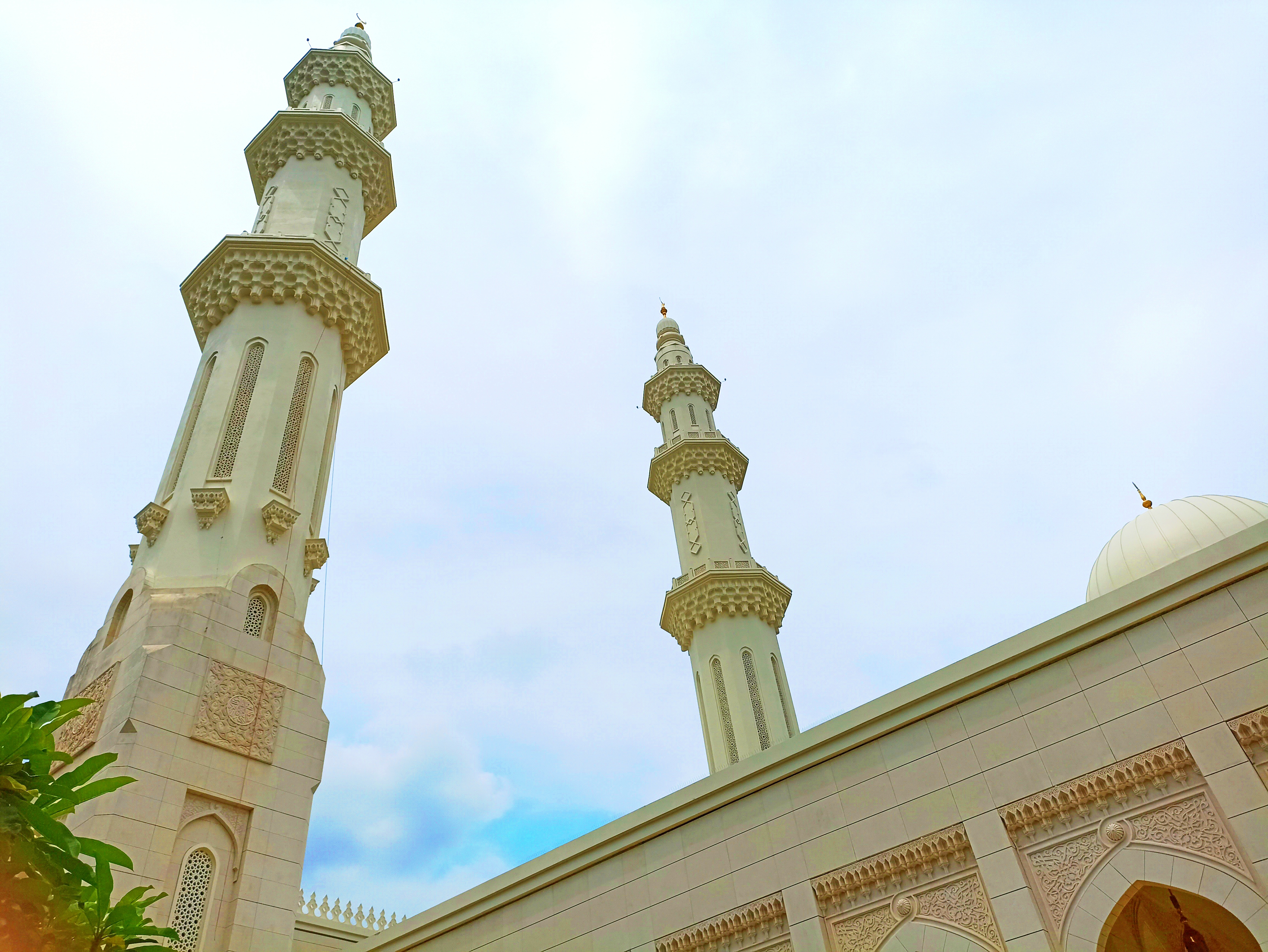
The mosque's two minarets

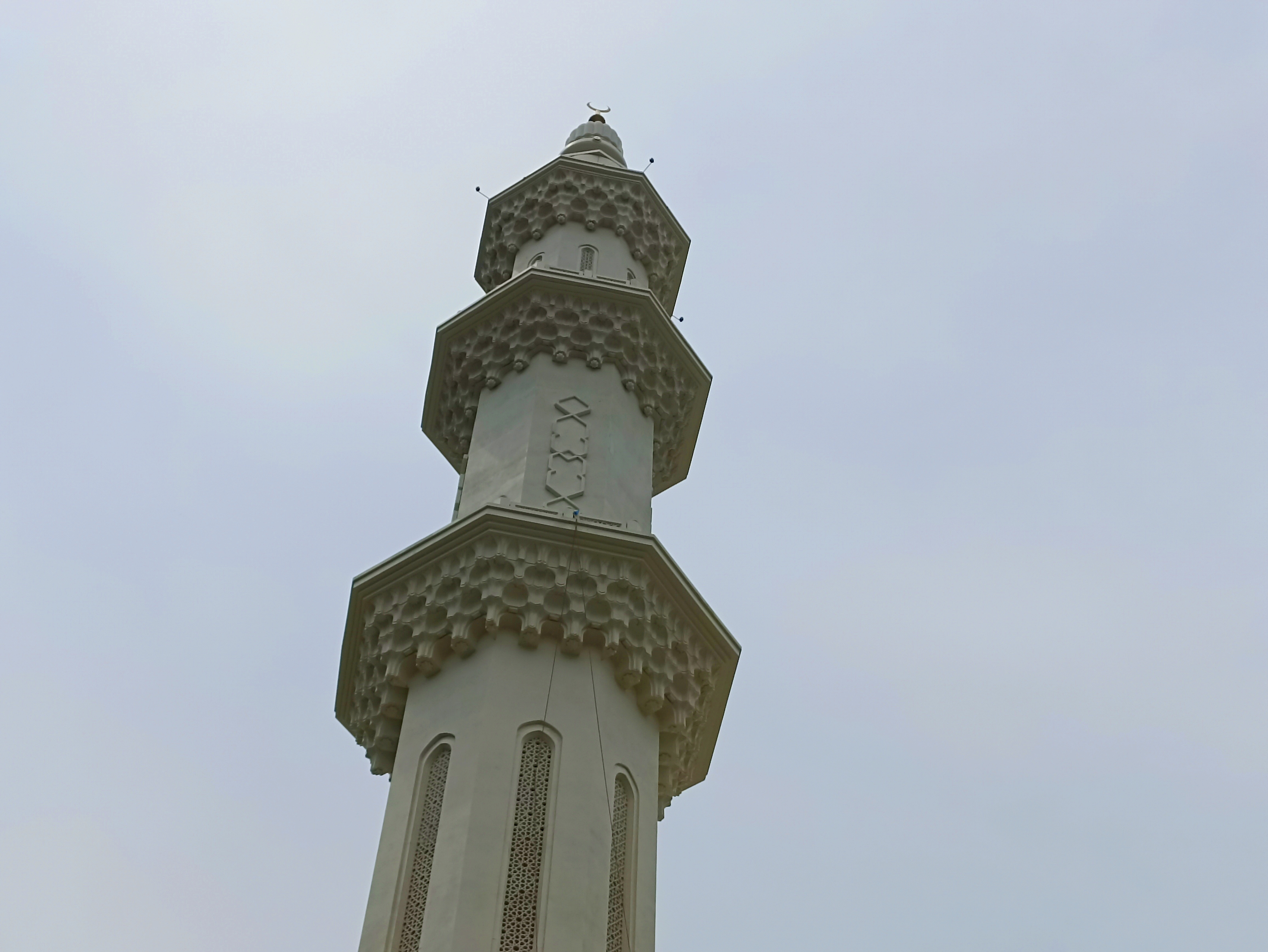
Closeup of one minaret

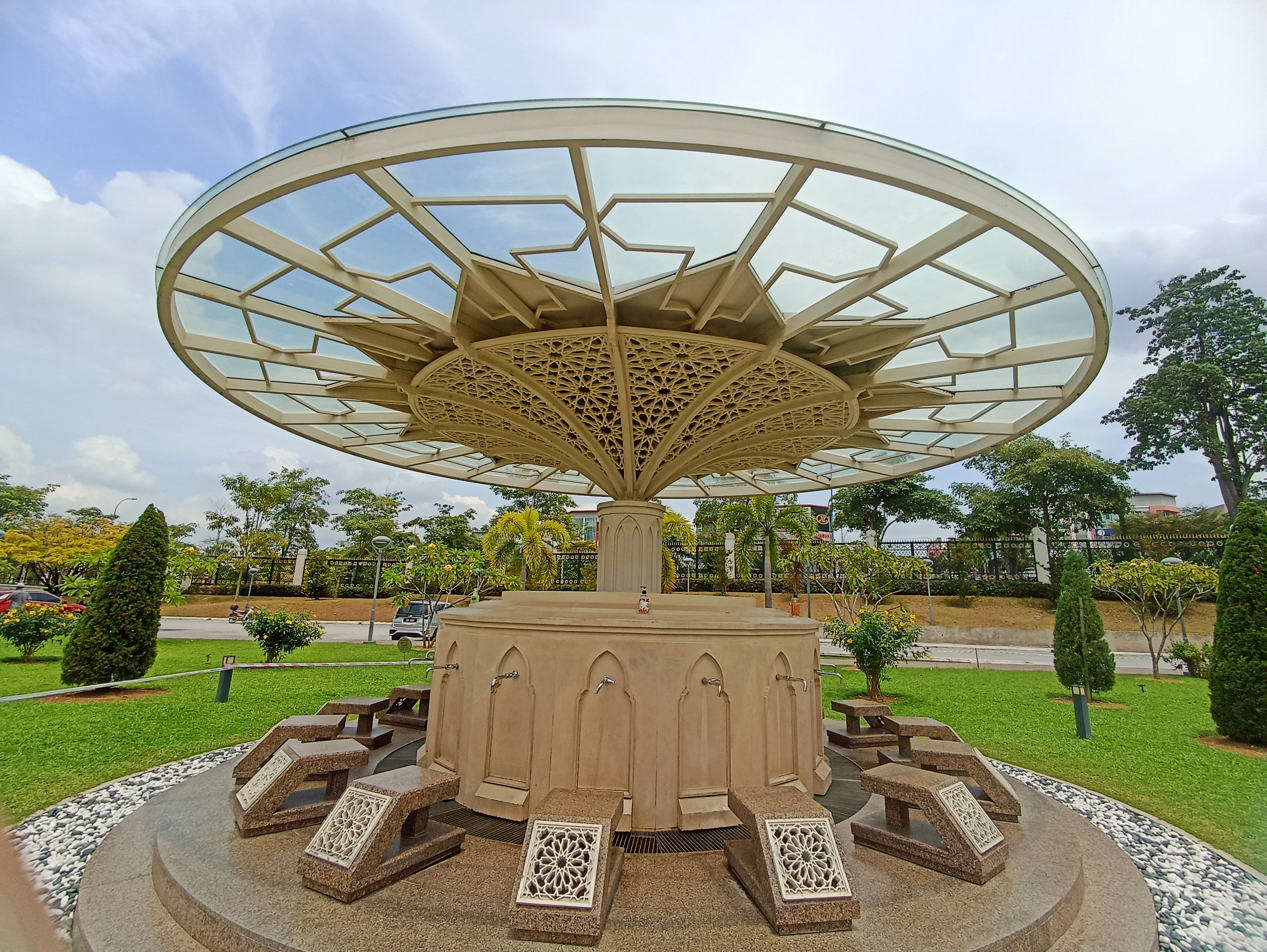
Wudu booth

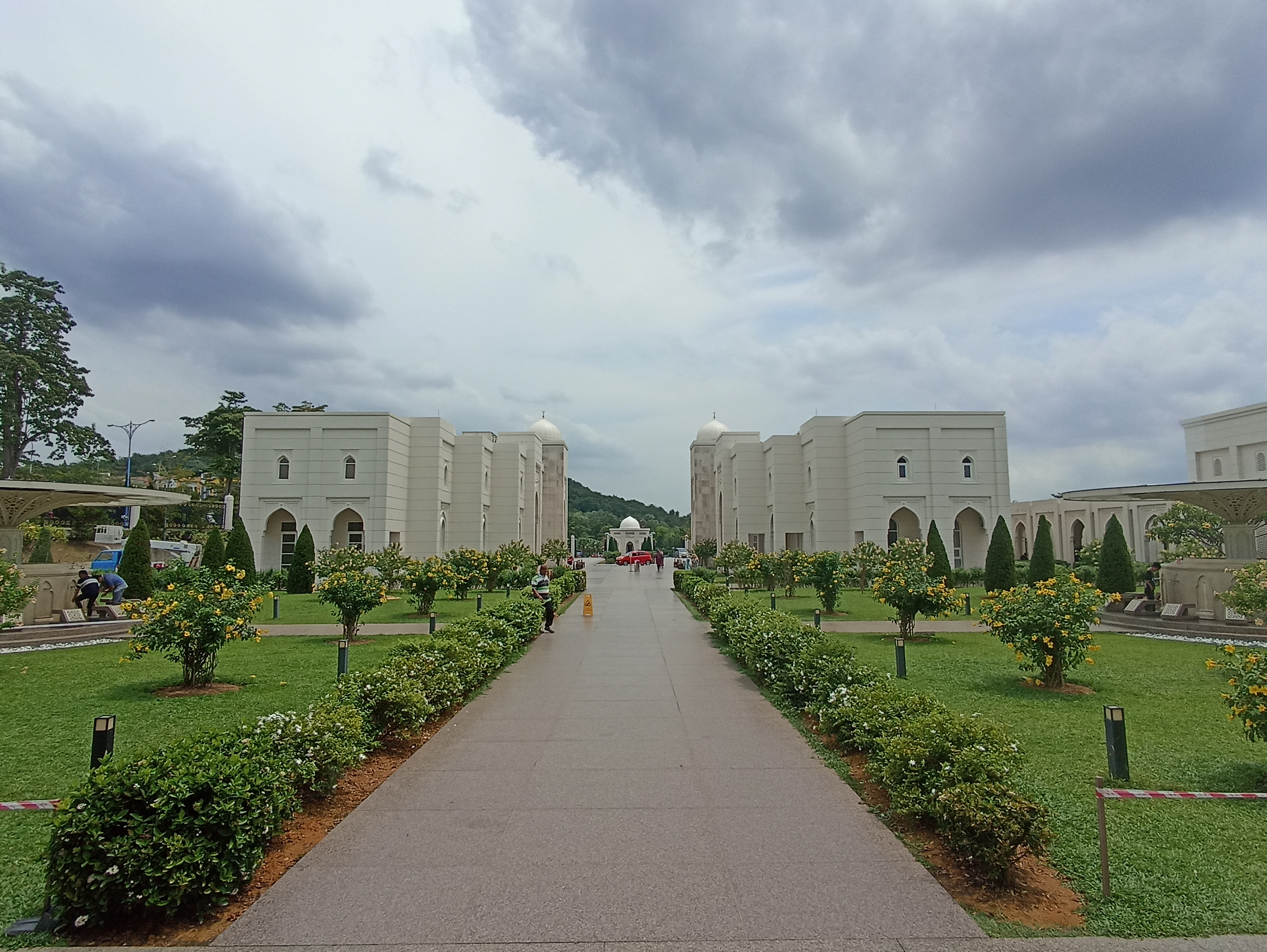
Mosque compounds, with the multipurpose hall (left) and administrative office (right) in the background. The domed structure at the far back is the security's post.
