= Nation Towers =

Skyscrapers in Abu Dhabi, United Arab Emirates

- Location within United Arab Emirates

General information
- Type: Offices, residential, hotel, shopping mall
- Location: Abu Dhabi; United Arab Emirates
- Coordinates: 24.464006°N 54.328015°E
- Construction started: 2009
- Completed: 2013
- Cost: 435m USD

Technical details
- Floor count: 65 and 52

Design and construction
- Architect: WZMH Architects
- Developer: International Capital Trading L.L.C.

Website
- www.nationtowers.ae

Nation Towers is the name of two skyscrapers near the southern end of the Corniche in Abu Dhabi, the capital of the United Arab Emirates.

== Construction history ==
Logo of Nation Towers

The construction of the towers was sponsored by International Capital Trading (owner), The contractors was a joint venture between Arabtec Construction and National Projects and Construction (NPC). The initial bid for the construction project was priced at $435 million (Dh1.6 billion). KEO International Consultants was the Lead Consultant, Engineer and Construction Supervisor. The design architect was WZMH Architects, won the appointment through an international design competition.

== Building description ==
The two buildings are located directly at the Abu Dhabi Corniche and have 65 and 52 floors. The Nation Towers were completed in 2013 and have apartments, offices, a shopping mall and a hotel (St. Regis Hotel Abu Dhabi). The complex offers approximately 278,709 meters of usable space. This include a 5-star hotel with 350 rooms, spas and a fitness facility. It is also home to upscale boutique shops geared towards high-end consumers.

Both buildings are connected with a skybridge at a height of 202.5 meters which connects floors 50 and 54. The skybridge was the highest in the world at its completion.

== See also ==
- List of tallest buildings in Abu Dhabi
- List of tallest buildings in the United Arab Emirates
