= Corniche (Abu Dhabi) =

Road in the United Arab Emirates

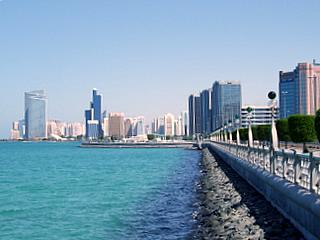
The Corniche in Abu Dhabi in the early 2000s.

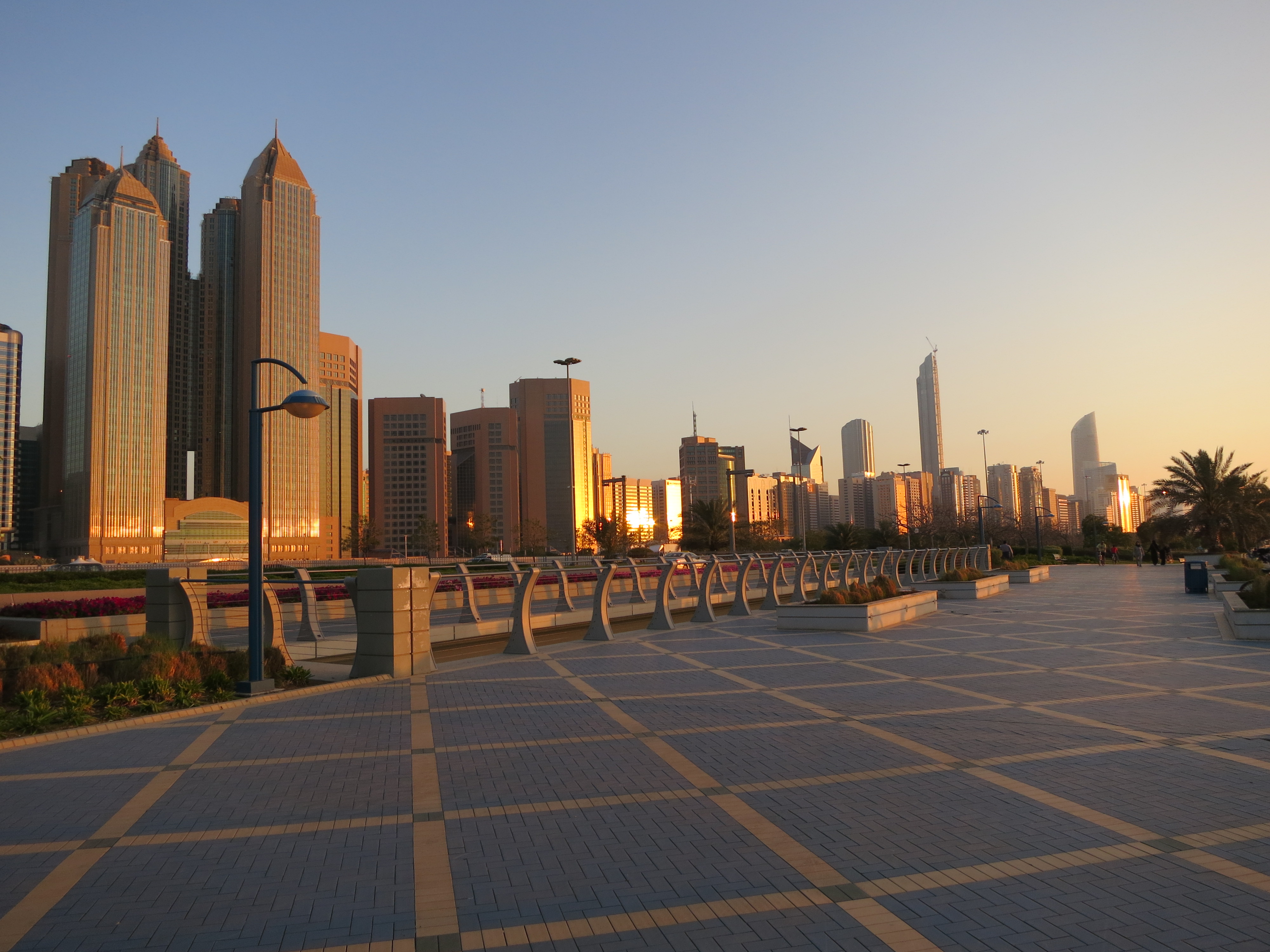
The Abu Dhabi skyline from the Corniche.

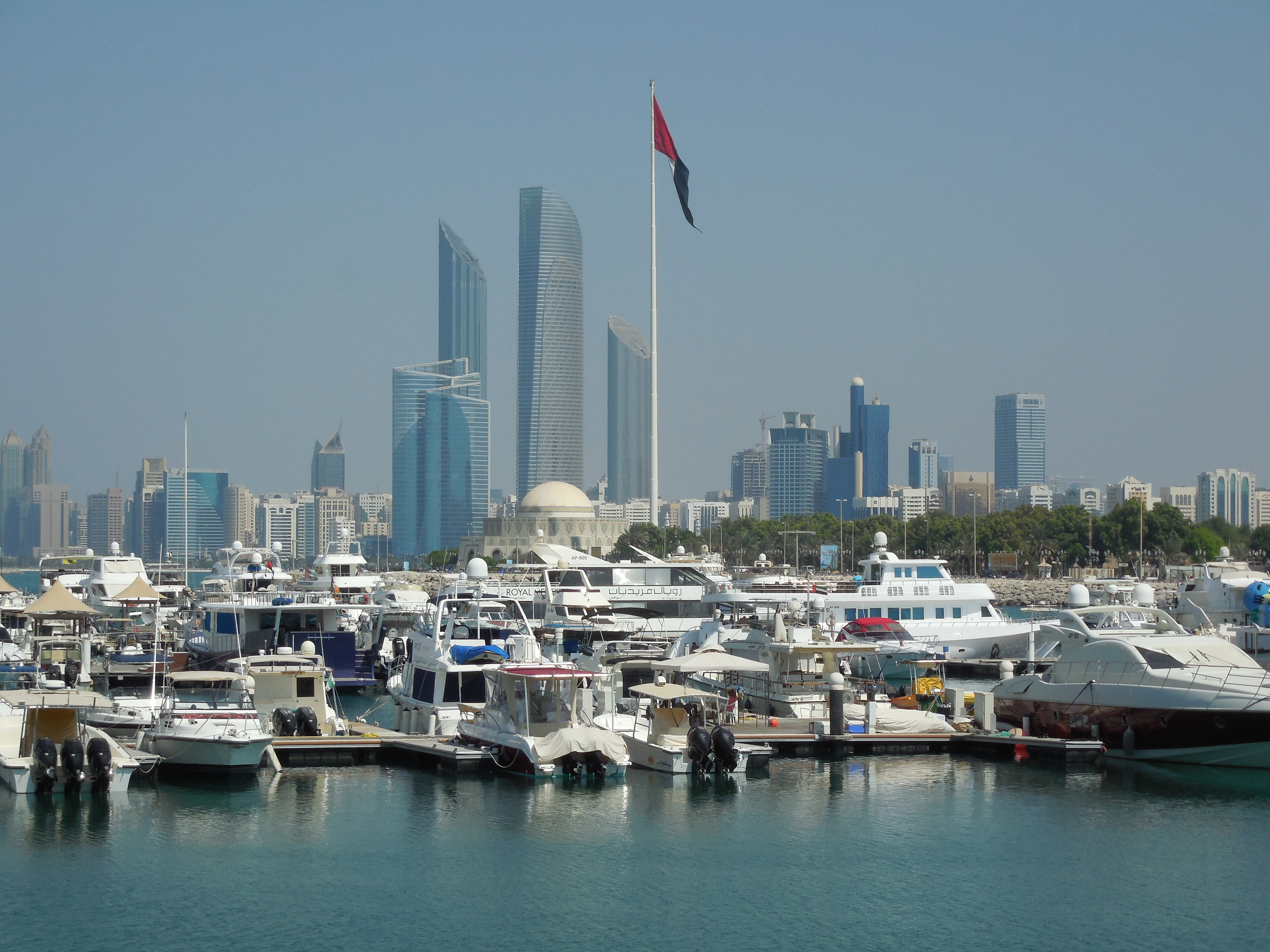
The Corniche as seen from the Marina Mall

The Corniche (or Corniche Road) is located in the city of Abu Dhabi, the capital of the United Arab Emirates. The Corniche is 8 kilometres (5.0 mi) long, and includes children's play areas, separate cycle and pedestrian pathways, restaurants, cafés, and the Corniche Beach.

It forms a sweeping curve on the western side of the main Abu Dhabi island and is replete with cycle paths, fountains, and park areas. Between 2002 and 2004, land was reclaimed from the sea, and the Corniche was extended. Some of the earlier landmarks - the volcano fountain and Abu Dhabi clocktower - were demolished in the process. Certain parts of the Corniche have significant deposition of sand, with people using the area as a public beach. Prior to the 1970s, the current area occupied by the Corniche was a beach, where dhows and ships used to anchor and transfer cargo or people; at the time, the Mina Zayed area was not yet constructed.

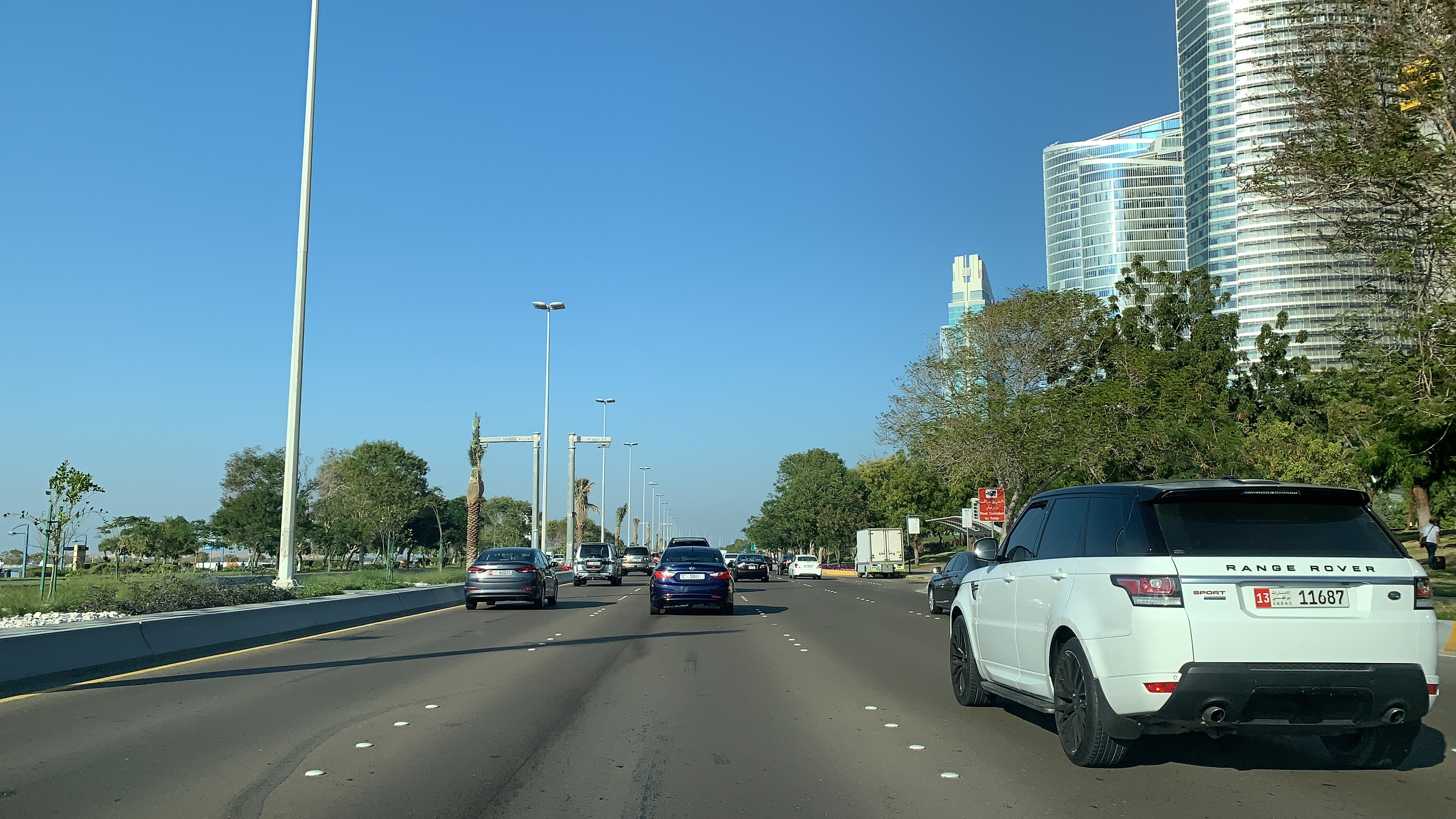
Driving along the Abu Dhabi Corniche

Marina Mall is located across from the Corniche and can be accessed using a narrow breakwater road. Near Marina Mall, the UAE flag is hoisted and is one of the tallest flagpoles in the world. Another mall in Corniche is the World Trade Center Mall, which is quite a big mall.

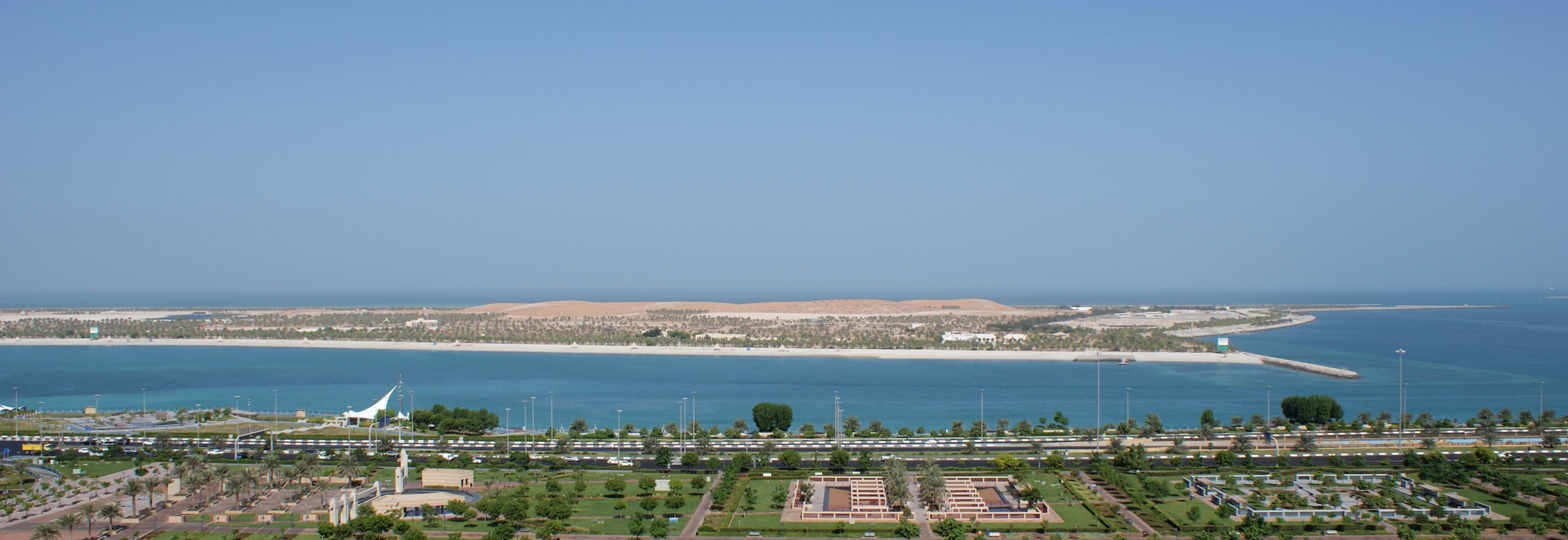
Lulu Island from the Corniche

Lulu Island is a tiny reclaimed island located about a kilometer from the corniche. The Emirates Palace Hotel is at the southern end of the corniche. There are a number of skyscrapers along the corniche, with newer taller skyscrapers being built on the southern end.

Abu Dhabi ladies beach was located at one end of the Corniche, but it was closed in 2022, in order to facilitate its redevelopment. The government wanted to build a Palace in the area.

== See also ==
- Corniche
- Mina Zayed
- Marine Drive, Mumbai, a similar area in Mumbai (Bombay)
