= World Trade Center Abu Dhabi =

Complex of two skyscrapers in Abu Dhabi, United Arab Emirates

- المركز التجاري العالمي أبو ظبي
- Burj Mohammed bin Rashid Tower (left) and The Trust Tower (right)
- Former names: Shanghai Center

General information
- Status: Complete; Cancelled
- Type: Residential and Commercial
- Location: Abu Dhabi, United Arab Emirates, Khalifa Bin Zayed The 1st Street
- Coordinates: 24°29′15.8″N 54°21′25.8″E
- Construction started: 5 September 2007; 19 years ago
- Completed: 4 November 2014; 11 years ago
- Owner: Aldar Properties PJSC

Height
- Roof: 382 m (1,253 ft); 276.6 m (907 ft) (tower 2); 255 m (837 ft) (tower 3)

Technical details
- Floor count: 92
- Lifts/elevators: 13

Design and construction
- Architect: Foster + Partners
- Structural engineer: Halvorson and Partners
- Main contractor: Arabian Construction Company

The World Trade Center Abu Dhabi is a complex of two skyscrapers in Abu Dhabi, United Arab Emirates. Construction of these towers was scheduled to end in 2010, though the 2008 financial crisis pushed the project completion date to 2014. The complex includes two malls, and one Courtyard by Marriott hotel. The complex was initially planned to house three skyscrapers, but the 2008 crisis forced the contractors to withdraw construction of the Hotel Tower, the result being two skyscrapers.

== Burj Mohammed bin Rashid ==
Burj Mohammed bin Rashid is the tallest building in Abu Dhabi and the skyscraper with the most floors in the city as of its completion in 2014. The residential building stands 382 metres (1,253 ft) tall and contains 92 floors. As of 2025, it is the eighth tallest residential building in the world. The tower is adjacent to the shorter Trust Tower offices.

== The Trust Tower ==
The office tower, called the "Trust Tower", rises 278 m (912 ft) and has 60 floors, completed in Q2 of 2012. The tower was publicly opened in 2013, and houses leased properties, and the offices of the World Trade Centers Association. It is connected to a Courtyard by Marriott via a large mall and a souk, both operated by the World Trade Center.

== The Hotel Tower ==
The shortest building in the complex, the "Central Market Hotel Tower", was supposed to stand 255 m (837 ft) tall and house 16 floors of hotel space under the Courtyard Marriott brand. Its plans for construction were scrapped soon after the 2007/2008 crisis.

== Gallery ==
Street-level view of World Trade Center Abu Dhabi

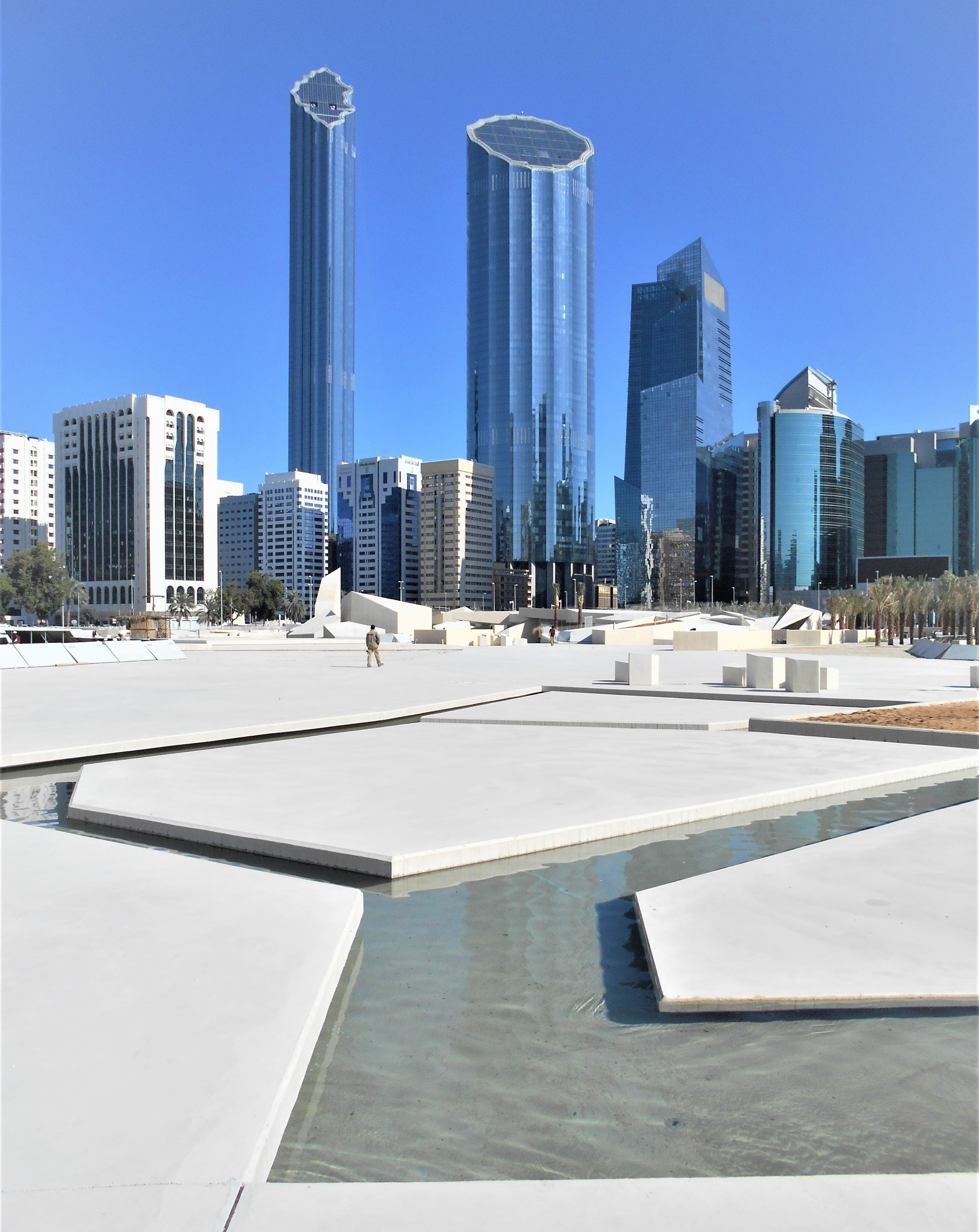
World Trade Center Abu Dhabi in the city skyline

== See also ==
- ADNOC Headquarters
- Burj Khalifa
- List of tallest buildings in Abu Dhabi
- List of tallest buildings in the United Arab Emirates

=== Similar structures ===
- The Landmark
- Q1, Tower in Australia
