= Sky Tower (Abu Dhabi) =

Coordinates: 24°29′45″N 54°24′27″E

- Sky tower (at right)
- Interactive map of the Sky Tower area

General information
- Type: residential / office / hotel
- Location: Abu Dhabi, United Arab Emirates, shams
- Construction started: July 15, 2006
- Completed: April 24, 2010 - September 15, 2010
- Opening: December 3, 2010
- Cost: 1 billion dollars
- Owner: Sorouh Real Estate

Height
- Architectural: 292.2 m (959 ft)
- Top floor: 309.4 m (1,015 ft)

Technical details
- Floor count: 80 floors above ground 3 floors below ground total 83
- Floor area: 1,706,778 ft^{2} (158,564.9 m^{2})
- Lifts/elevators: 38 and 4 escalators

Design and construction
- Architect: Arquitectonica
- Developer: aldar
- Structural engineer: Hyder Consulting
- Main contractor: Arabian Construction Company

Sky Tower Abu Dhabi is a 312.2-metre-tall (1,024 ft) skyscraper with 80 floors in Abu Dhabi, United Arab Emirates. It is located on Al Reem Island and includes office and residential and hotel (Bloomfields) . Construction was completed in 2010 when it was the city's largest building but has been overtaken by The Landmark since, see also Abu Dhabi skyscrapers. The tower is twinned with the neighboring Sun Tower and part of the Shams Abu Dhabi development project.

The building, designed by the US firm Architectonica, has 712 residential units 474 office units and 112 hotel units. The Arabian Construction Company (ACC) was commissioned to build the tower.

The building won the GCC Residential Project of the Year award at the Construction Week Awards 2011.

== See also ==
- List of tallest buildings in Abu Dhabi
- List of tallest buildings in the United Arab Emirates
