= Silver Tower (Abu Dhabi) =

Building in Abu Dhabi, United Arab Emirates

Coordinates: 24°29′32.92″N 54°21′31.95″E

The Silver Tower in Abu Dhabi

Silver Tower is a 120m tall building which was in 2006 the 16th tallest in Abu Dhabi, capital of the United Arab Emirates. Silver Tower or HH Sheikh Hamdan Bin Zayed Al Nahyan Tower was built circa 1990 by Cassia and Associates. It used to be on the main Corniche Road, but with the reconstruction of the Corniche recently, the road next to Silver Tower is now called Corniche Lane. The building's first four levels are for office use by Abu Dhabi Investment Authority and the rest of the floors from 5 to 29 (29 is the Penthouse) are residential.

== Internal Design ==
- From the 20th floor to the 28th, the flat numbers arranged are at a different order and orientation from those from the 5th floor to the 19th.
- The mosaics designs on each lobby contain white, blue and purple hexagons.
- Each lobby has 6 light switches.

== See also ==
- Silver Tower, Germany
