= Abu Dhabi Investment Authority Tower =

Coordinates: 24.4861527°N 54.3514789°E

- ADIA Tower at night
- Interactive map of the Abu Dhabi Investment Authority Tower area
- Alternative names: ADIA Tower

General information
- Status: Completed
- Type: Office
- Location: 211 Corniche Road, Abu Dhabi, United Arab Emirates
- Construction started: 2001
- Completed: 2006

Height
- Architectural: 185.0 m (607 ft)
- Tip: 185.0 m (607 ft)
- Roof: 185.0 m (607 ft)

Technical details
- Floor count: 40
- Floor area: 73,000 m^{2} (785,800 sq ft)
- Lifts/elevators: 13

Design and construction
- Architecture firm: Kohn Pedersen Fox Associates
- Structural engineer: BuroHappold Engineering
- Main contractor: Samsung C&T Corporation

Website
- www.adia.ae

Abu Dhabi Investment Authority Tower is a skyscraper in the city of Abu Dhabi, the capital of the United Arab Emirates. It was completed in 2006 and hosts the Abu Dhabi Investment Authority. It has a height of 185 m (607 ft) and has 40 floors.

== See also ==
Abu Dhabi Investment Authority Tower in skyline at center left

- List of tallest buildings in Abu Dhabi
- Al Hamra Tower in Kuwait, another skyscraper with a fold-like exterior
