= Etihad Towers =

Towers in Abu Dhabi

- Etihad Towers in November 2012

- Location within United Arab Emirates

General information
- Type: T1: hotel / residential; T2: residential; T3: office; T4: residential; T5: residential
- Location: Abu Dhabi; United Arab Emirates
- Coordinates: 24.459322°N 54.321297°E
- Construction started: October 27, 2006
- Topped-out: November 2010
- Completed: October 27, 2011

Height
- Architectural: T1: 277.6 m (911 ft); T2: 305.3 m (1,002 ft); T3: 260.3 m (854 ft); T4: 234.0 m (767.7 ft); T5: 217.5 m (714 ft)
- Top floor: T1: 251.2 m (824 ft); T2: 281.6 m (924 ft); T3: 235.8 m (774 ft); T4: 206.7 m (678 ft); T5: 190.2 m (624 ft)
- Observatory: T1: 251.2 m (824 ft); T2: 281.6 m (924 ft)

Technical details
- Floor count: T1: 69; T2: 80; T3: 60; T4: 66; T5: 61
- Floor area: T1: 70,908 m^{2} (763,250 sq ft); T2: 83,738 m^{2} (901,350 sq ft); T3: 74,198 m^{2} (798,660 sq ft); T4: 49,819 m^{2} (536,250 sq ft); T5: 45,049 m^{2} (484,900 sq ft)
- Lifts/elevators: T1: 12; T2: 7; T3: 19; T4: 5; T5: 5

Design and construction
- Architect: DBI Design
- Developer: Sheikh Suroor Projects Department
- Structural engineer: AECOM
- Main contractor: Arabian Construction Company (ACC)

Etihad Towers is a complex of buildings with five towers in Abu Dhabi, the capital city of the United Arab Emirates.

== Usage and history ==
The towers are located opposite the Emirates Palace hotel and feature offices, apartments and a hotel. The estimated cost for the construction was 2.5 billion Dirhams. Towers 2 and 5 topped out in November 2010.

A year later, in November 2011, the Jumeirah at Etihad Towers Hotel which belongs to Jumeirah Group was opened in Tower 1. Tori No Su Japanese restaurant opened within the hotel in 2012. The hotel has been rebranded to Conrad Abu Dhabi Etihad Towers which opened doors in Tower 1 on October 1, 2020. The adjacent Tower 2 is (as of January 2023) the fourth tallest in Abu Dhabi. Tower 2 has an observation deck named "Observation Deck at 300" on the 75th floor which is accessible from the hotel via a lower level linking podium.

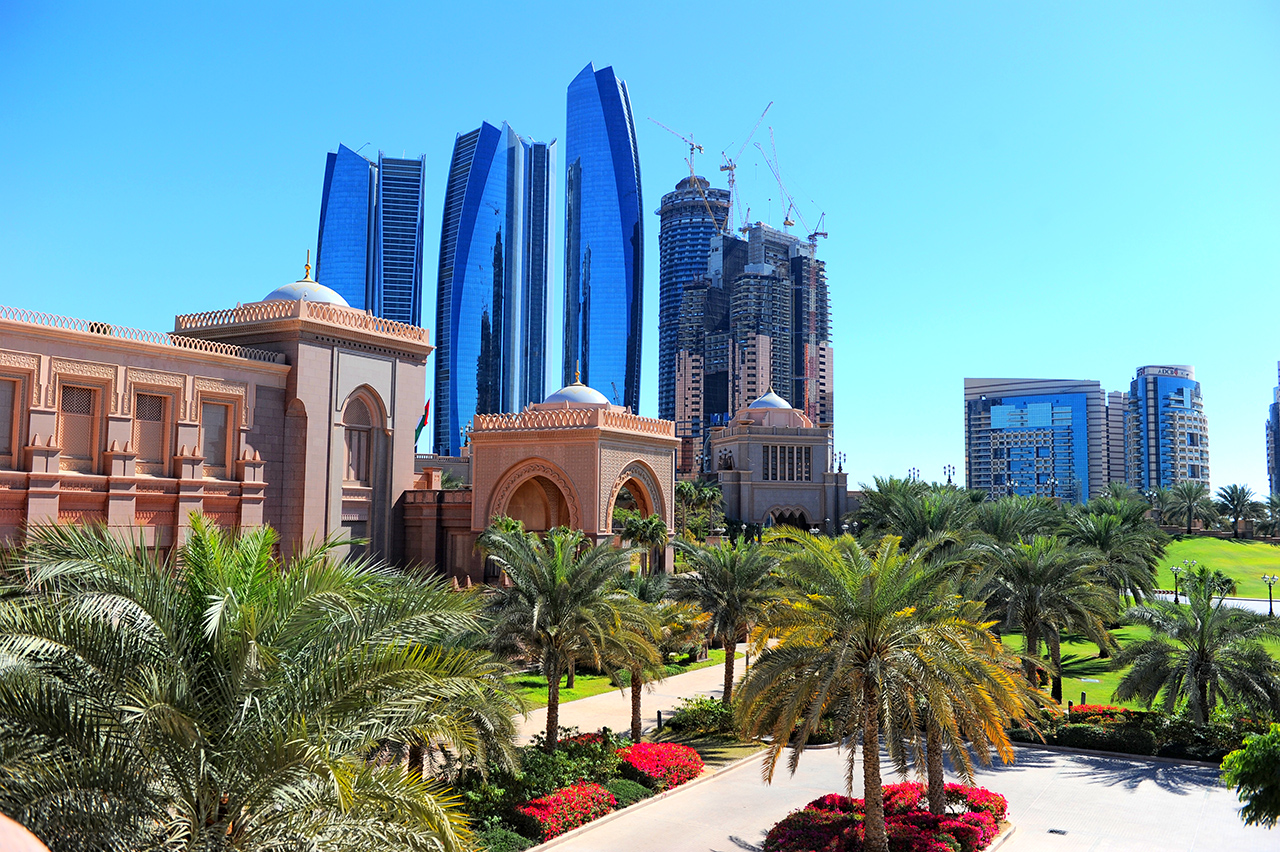
Etihad Towers

The towers were used as a filming location for the 2015 film Furious 7. In the film, Dominic Toretto (Vin Diesel) and Brian O'Conner (Paul Walker) steal a Lykan HyperSport and drive it through three of the towers.

During the 2026 Israeli–United States strikes on Iran the facade of the towers was damaged by the debris of an Iranian drone.

== Architectural features ==
- Tower 1: 69 floors, 277 metres (909 ft)
- Tower 2: 74 floors, 305 metres (1,001 ft)
- Tower 3: 54 floors, 260 metres (853 ft)
- Tower 4: 61 floors, 234 metres (768 ft)
- Tower 5: 55 floors, 218 metres (715 ft)

== See also ==
- List of tallest buildings in Abu Dhabi
- List of tallest buildings in the United Arab Emirates
