= ADNOC Headquarters =

Skyscraper in Abu Dhabi

Coordinates: 24°27′43″N 54°19′27″E

General information
- Status: Completed
- Type: Commercial - Multi-Storey Project
- Location: Abu Dhabi, United Arab Emirates
- Current tenants: Abu Dhabi National Oil Company (ADNOC)
- Construction started: 2009
- Completed: 2017
- Cost: $316.45 million (estimated)
- Owner: Adnoc (UAE Government)

Height
- Height: 342 m (1,122 ft)

Technical details
- Floor count: 76
- Floor area: 190,000 square meters

Design and construction
- Main contractor: Six Construct Co

ADNOC Headquarters is a skyscraper office complex located in Abu Dhabi, United Arab Emirates and is the corporate headquarters of the Abu Dhabi National Oil Company (ADNOC).

The building incorporates energy efficiency and sustainable engineering technologies, such as a double skin façade, LED exterior lighting. Designed by HOK, the overall building complex consists of more than 65 floors with an office tower, corniche club, SPC and Crisis Management Centre, a heritage museum and other supporting facilities.

== Gallery ==
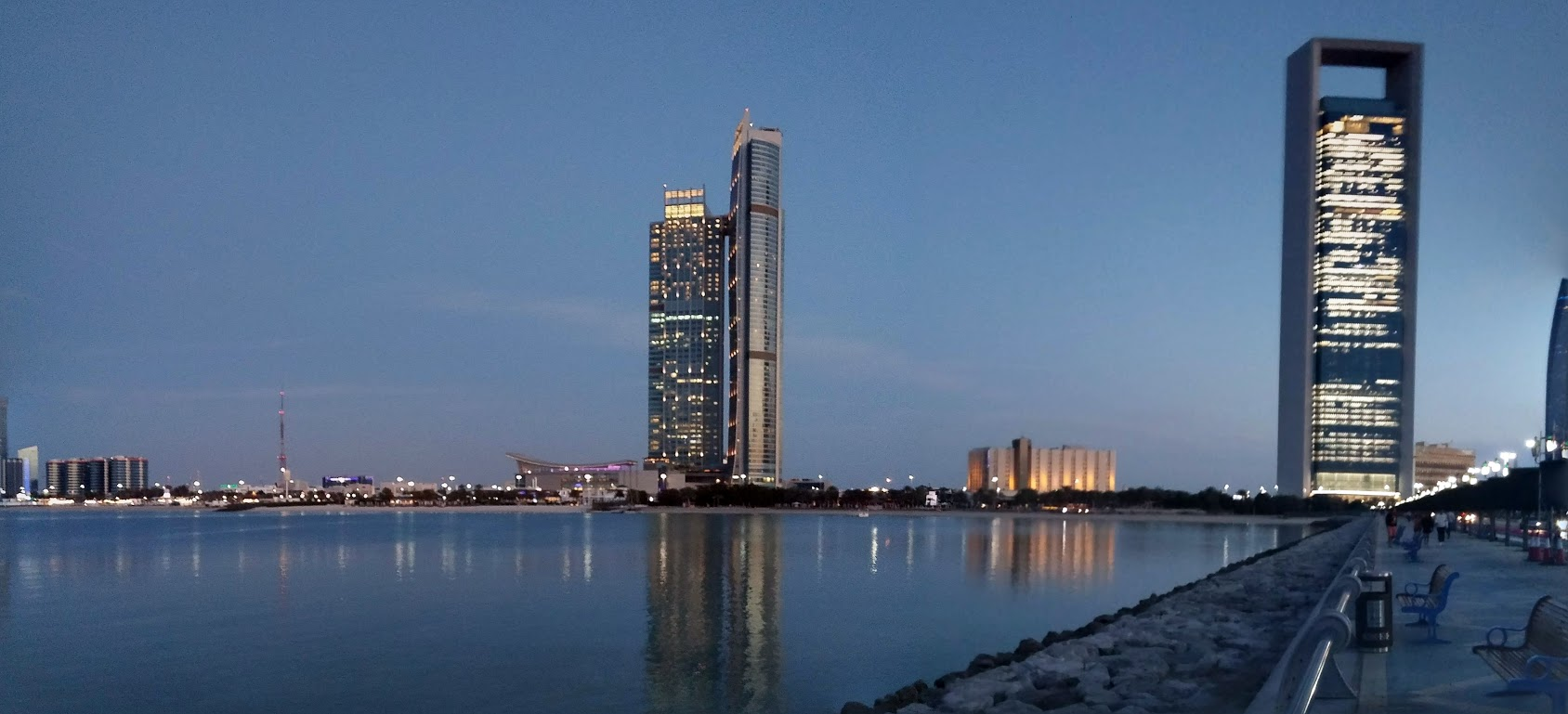
Skyline of Abu Dhabi with ADNOC Headquarters at right

ADNOC Headquarters at dawn

== See also ==
- List of tallest buildings in Abu Dhabi
- List of tallest buildings in the United Arab Emirates
