= Marina Mall, Abu Dhabi =

Coordinates: 24.475964°N 54.321315°E

Marina Mall
- Location: Abu Dhabi, United Arab Emirates
- Opened: 28 March 2001; 25 years ago
- Website: www.marinamall.ae

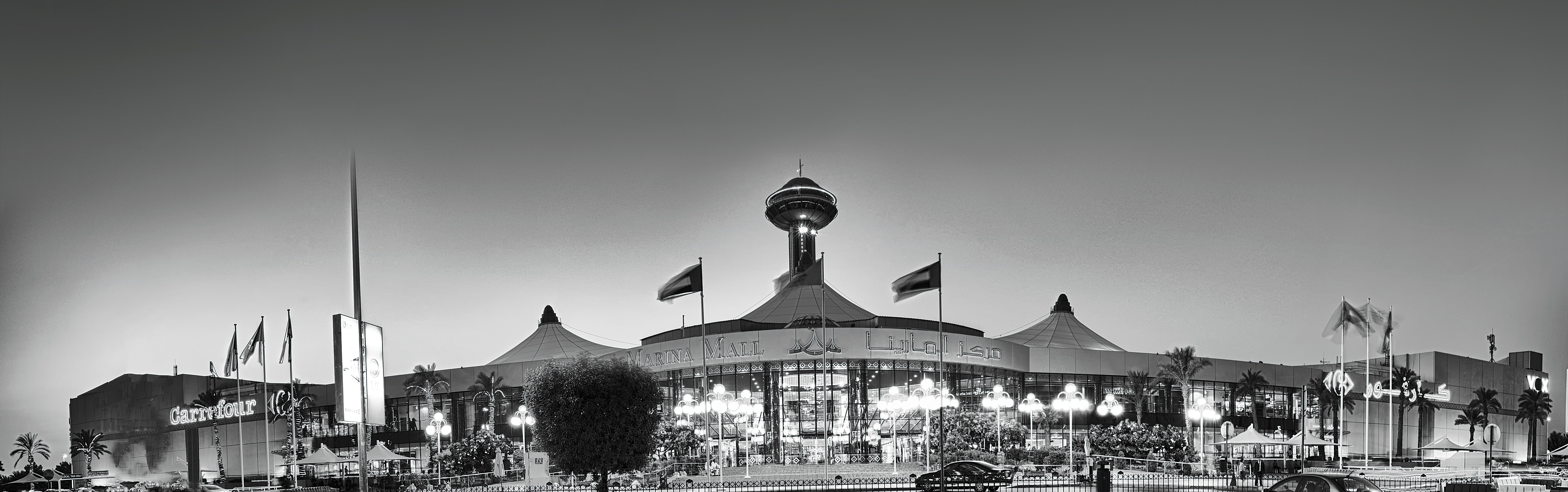
Marina Mall Abu Dhabi, Abu Dhabi's premier shopping destination

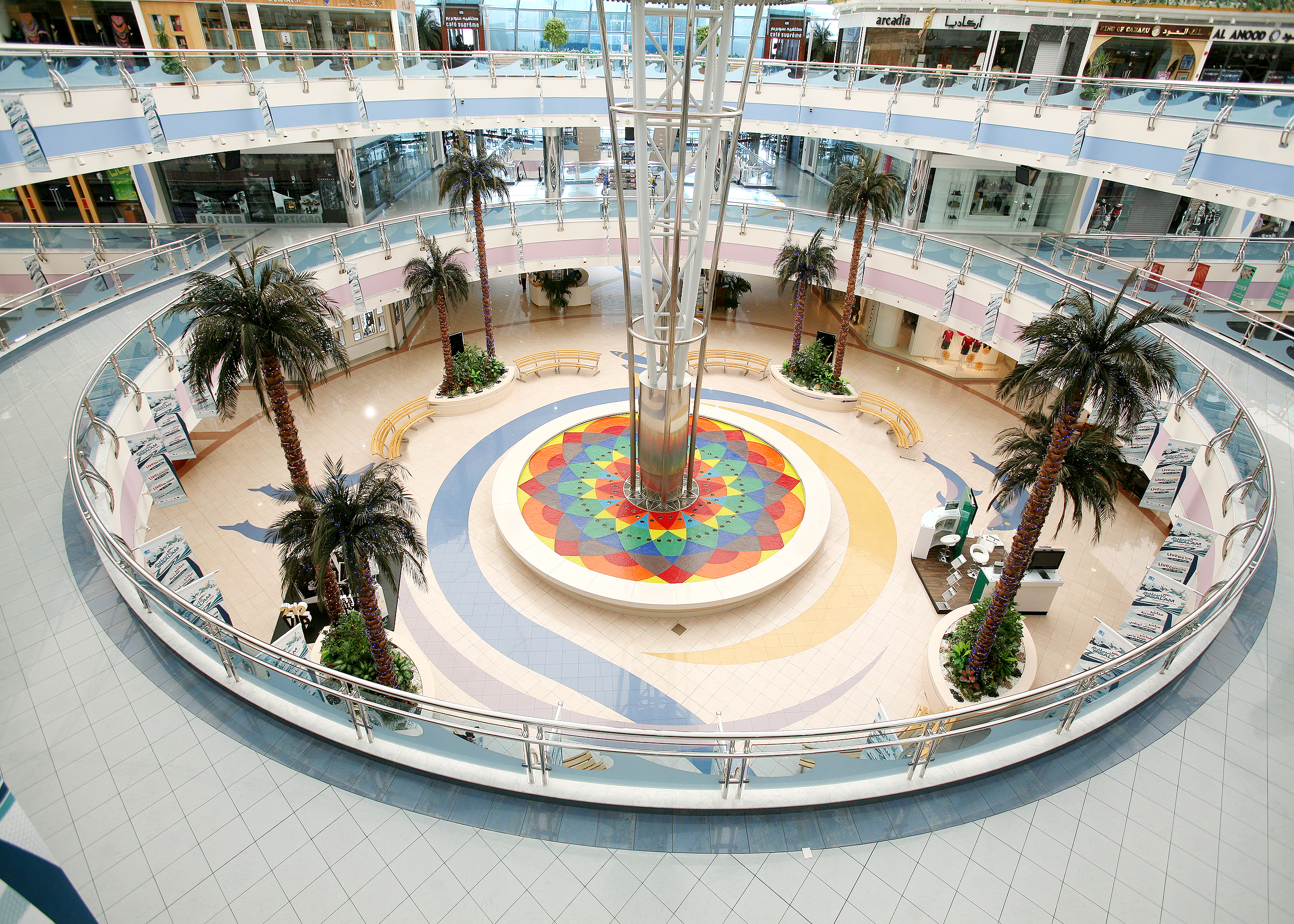
Internal steam fountain in main atrium

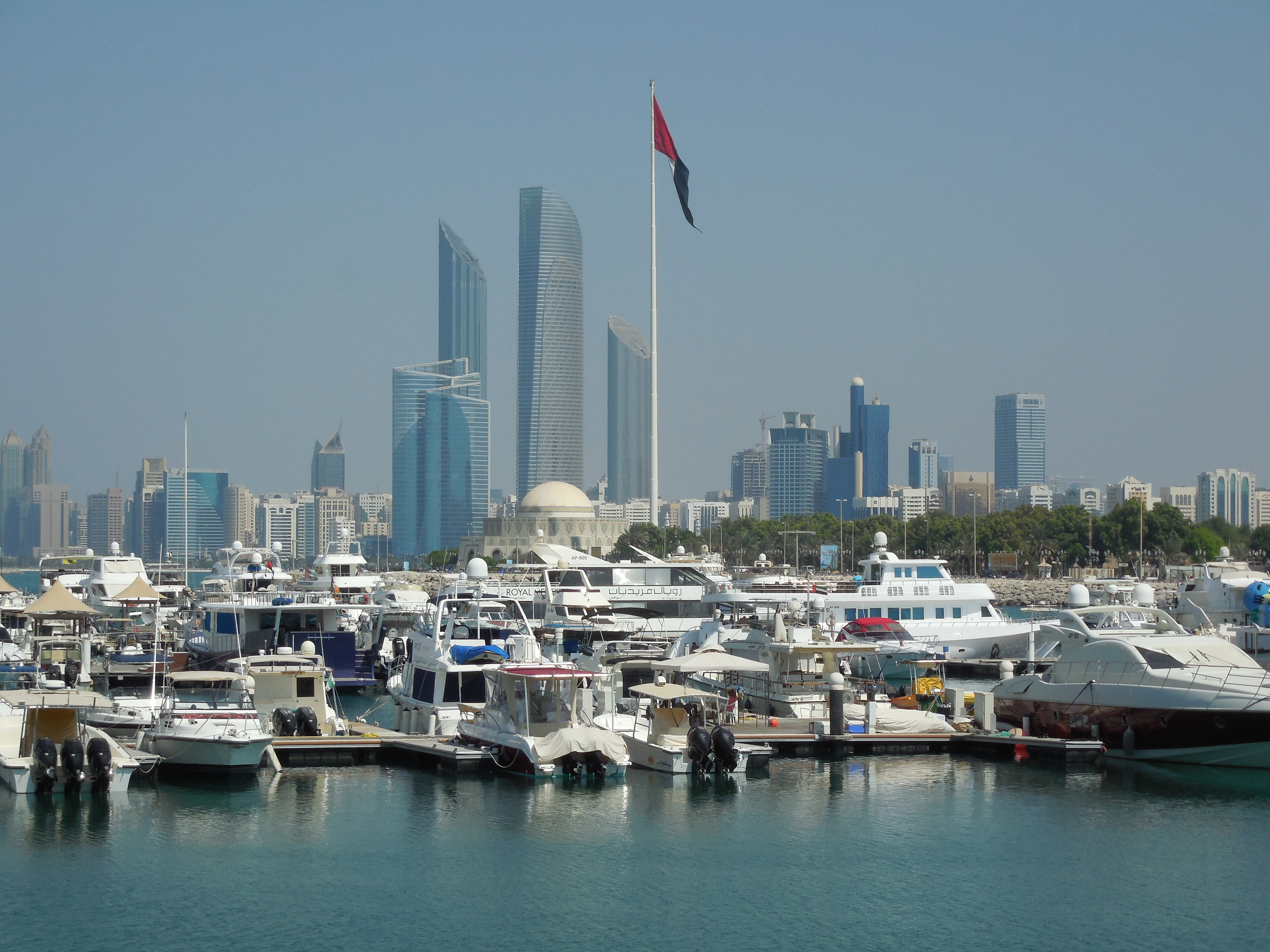
The Corniche as seen from the Marina Mall complex

Marina Mall (Arabic: مركز المارينا) is an Abu Dhabi shopping mall and entertainment venue which was completed in December 2000 and opened its doors to the public on 28 March 2001. The Mall is located along the breakwater on Corniche road, close to the Emirates Palace hotel. In January 2017, Forbes recognized Marina Mall as one of the top shopping malls in Abu Dhabi.

== Details ==
Geographically located in one of the city’s most prominent districts, it comprises 122,000 m^{2} of retail space featuring a unique selection of fashion, leisure and entertainment brands arranged over four levels, in addition to a 100 metre observatory, a bowling alley, a multiplex movie complex, musical fountains and a Carrefour departmental store. The internal steam fountain is adorned with handcrafted glass mosaic art designed and produced by MEC Artworks.

Ikea was located here and they moved later to Yas Island.

== Extensions ==
The mall was extended in 2007 and the masterplan included the observatory and other facilities. Another extension is also being considered.
