= The Landmark (Abu Dhabi) =

- The Landmark in March 2013

- Location within United Arab Emirates

General information
- Status: Completed
- Type: Mixed-use
- Location: Abu Dhabi, United Arab Emirates
- Coordinates: 24.484955°N 54.35076°E
- Construction started: 2006
- Opening: 2013

Height
- Antenna spire: 324 metres (1,063 ft)
- Top floor: 268 metres (879 ft)

Technical details
- Floor count: 72
- Floor area: 1,707,641 square feet (158,645.0 m^{2})
- Lifts/elevators: 18

Design and construction
- Architect: Cesar Pelli & Associates Architects
- Structural engineer: BuroHappold Engineering
- Main contractor: Al Habtoor Engineering Enterprises; Consolidated Contractors International Company S.A.L.

The Landmark is a postmodern supertall skyscraper in Abu Dhabi, United Arab Emirates. The mixed-use project stands 324 metres (1,063 ft) tall with 72 floors above ground and five basement levels. Construction on the skyscraper started in late 2006 and the building was completed in 2013. It is the second tallest building in Abu Dhabi behind the Burj Mohammed bin Rashid in the Central Market Project World Trade Center complex.

== History ==
In February 2007, the joint venture consisting of Consolidated Contractors International Company (CCC) and Al-Habtoor Engineering Enterprises was awarded the contract to build the Landmark tower. The design included about 70 floors and five basement levels, apartments, residential areas, offices, shops, restaurants, a sky garden and penthouses. The client of was the Department of President's Affairs, with construction to be finished by July 2010, with the contract for $381 million. In August 2007, a new record was set in the AUE, for largest single concrete pouring, at Landmark Tower Project, with 16,000 cubic metres making it "one of the largest pourings of self compacting concrete anywhere in the world."

The building was constructed over six years. At 330 metres tall, it had 31 floors for offices, 28 floors of apartments, five levels of underground parking, a fitness center, and restaurant. It also had a "sky garden" and pool. It was designed of Pelli Clarke Pelli, a firm in Connecticut, and drew "inspiration from a desert flower and the dodecagon." Argentine architect Cesar Pelli was responsible for designing the skyscraper.

== See also ==
- List of tallest buildings in the United Arab Emirates
- List of tallest buildings in Abu Dhabi

=== Similar structures ===
- World Trade Center Abu Dhabi, tower in the UAE
- Almas Tower, tower in the UAE
- Q1 Tower, tower in Australia
