= Emirates Palace Mandarin Oriental, Abu Dhabi =

Luxury hotel in Abu Dhabi

Coordinates: 24°27′43″N 54°19′00″E

Emirates Palace Mandarin Oriental, Abu Dhabi قصر الإمارات
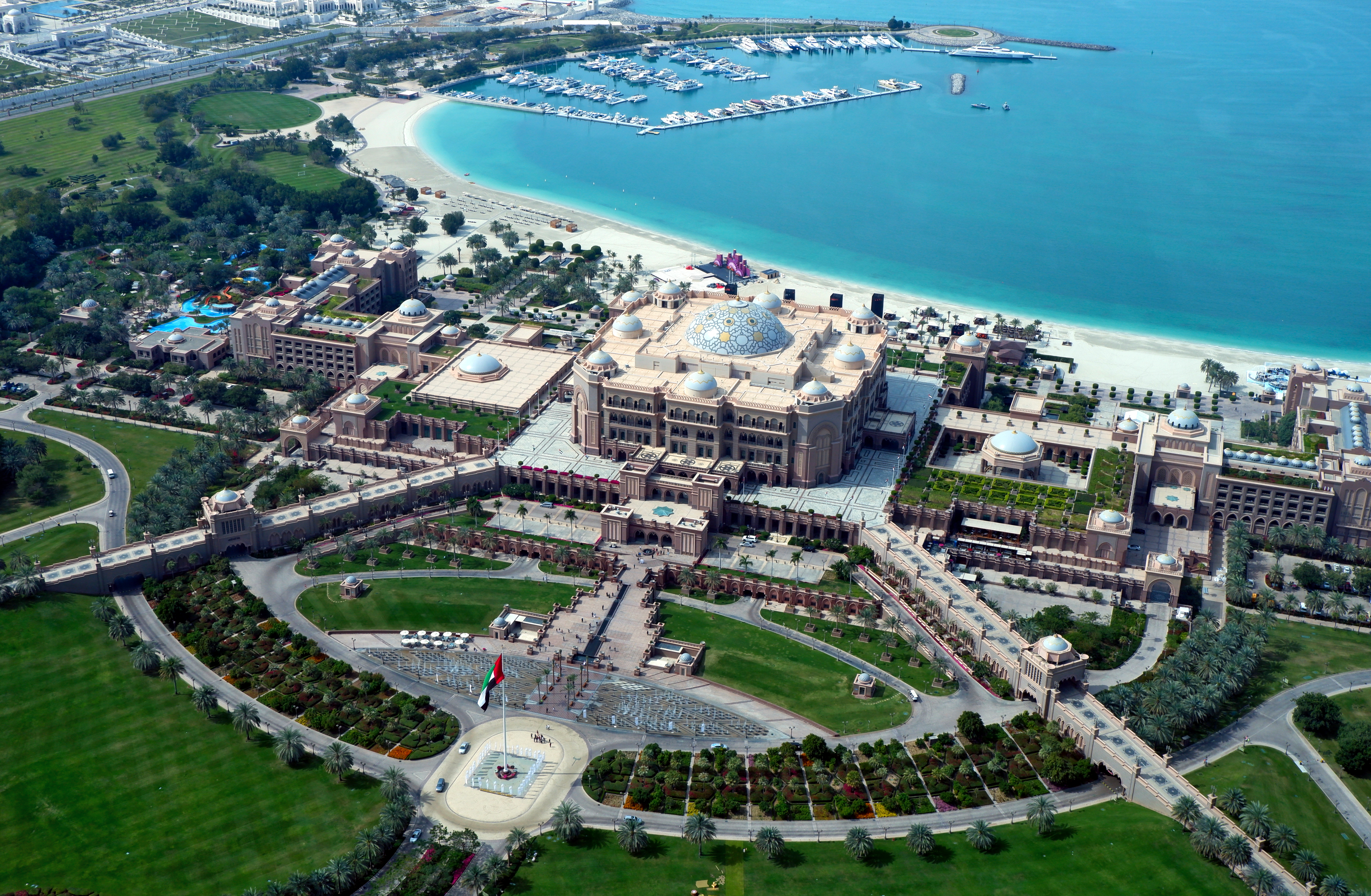
- Emirates Palace as seen from Etihad Towers

General information
- Location: Ras Al Akhdar, Abu Dhabi, United Arab Emirates
- Opening: February 2005
- Cost: $3 billion
- Owner: The Government of Abu Dhabi
- Operator: Mandarin Oriental

Design and construction
- Architects: Wimberly Allison Tong & Goo

Other information
- Number of rooms: 394

Website
- Emirates Palace Mandarin Oriental

The Emirates Palace Mandarin Oriental, Abu Dhabi (Arabic: قصر الإمارات) is a luxury five-star hotel in Abu Dhabi, United Arab Emirates. It has been operated by Mandarin Oriental as of 1 January 2020. The hotel project was launched in December 2001 and was initially operated by Kempinski from its opening in November 2005 until 1 January 2020.

Due to the change in management, the building was renovated over the course of two years.

== Construction ==
The building was designed by WATG Architects, combining modern construction methods with Islamic architectural elements such as symmetry, geometric patterns, and hierarchical emphasis. The structure includes a central patterned dome and 114 smaller domes spread across the building, with an exterior color inspired by Arabian Desert sand. Construction by the Belgian company BESIX began in December 2001. Interior works were completed by Depa Interiors, and the hotel opened in February 2005. At a cost of approximately US$3 billion (11.02 billion dirhams), it was the third most expensive hotel ever built, following the Cosmopolitan of Las Vegas and Marina Bay Sands.

== Rooms and facilities ==
Emirates Palace includes 390 residences, with 92 suites and 22 residential suites distributed across two wings and a central building. The interiors feature gold and marble decor, with the main building containing a gold-patterned dome. The penthouse floor houses six Rulers' Suites reserved for visiting dignitaries and royalty.

Facilities include two spas, over 40 meeting rooms, a 1.3 km beach, a marina, and two helicopter pads. The venue also features a ballroom for up to 2,500 people, luxury shops, and international restaurants.

== Events ==
Musical performances at the venue have included Justin Timberlake in December 2007 and Christina Aguilera in October 2008. The hotel has also served as a filming location for The Kingdom (2007), Fast and Furious 7 (2015), 6 Underground (2019), and Bade Miyan Chote Miyan (2024).

In January 2011, the hotel grounds hosted a 2010–11 LV Cup match between London Wasps and Harlequins, marking the first English domestic rugby match played abroad.

== Awards ==
In 2008, the hotel received the International Five Star Diamond Award for the Middle East. From 2011 to 2018, it was awarded in various categories by the World Travel Awards and World Spa Awards, including those for beach facilities, conference services, and spa treatments.

== Image gallery ==
Dome above the lobby area

Restaurants and main lounge

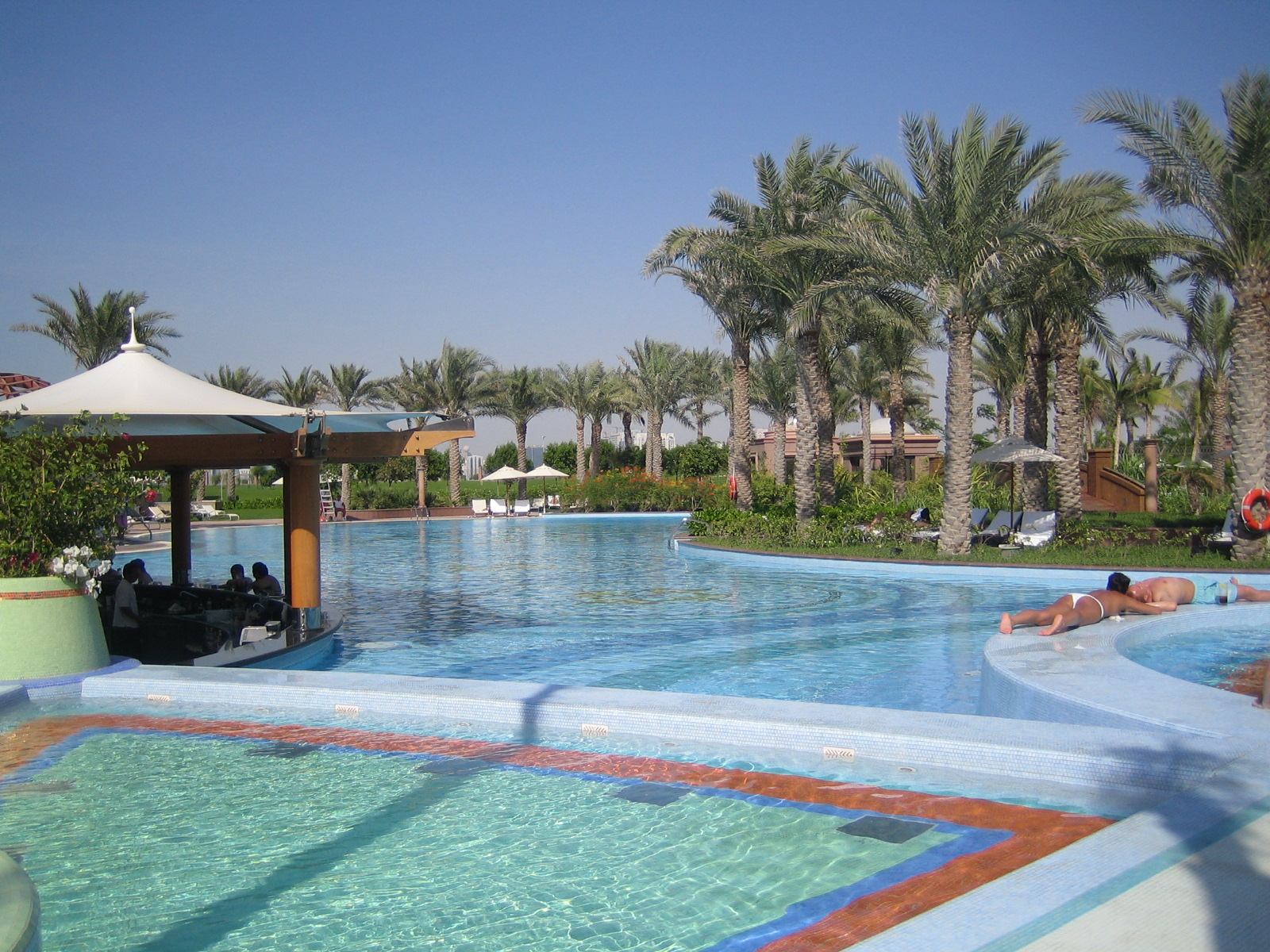
Outdoor swimming pool of Emirate Palace Hotel
