= Adio =

Adio may refer to:

== Government ==
- Abu Dhabi Investment Office, a government investments and special projects entity based in Abu Dhabi

== Business ==
- Adio (company), the former skateboard footwear and apparel company

== Music ==
=== Songs ===
- "Adio" (song), a song by Montenegrin recording artist Knez that represented Montenegro at the Eurovision Song Contest 2015
- "Adio", a 1970 song by Ljupka Dimitrovska
- "Adio", a 1985 song by Ljubisa Samardzic
- "Adio", song by Oliver Dragojevic

== See also ==
- Addio (disambiguation)
- Audio (disambiguation)
