= Sabkha =

Salt lake above the tide line, where evaporite deposits accumulate

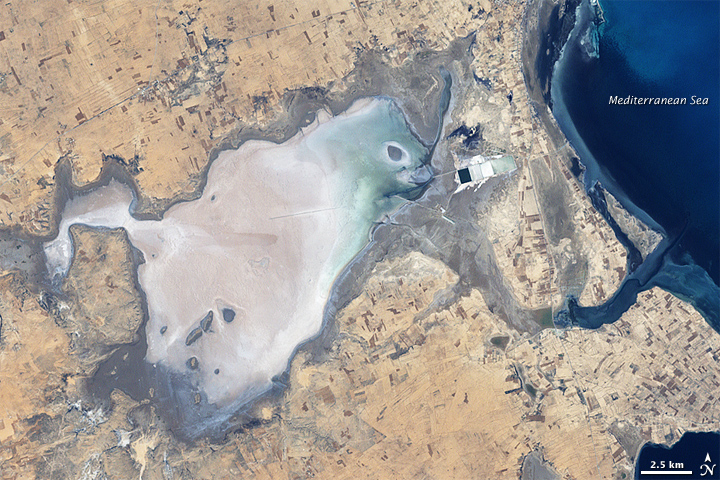
Sebkhat (or Sebkha) El Melah, Tunisia in 2001, mostly dry. Note rectangular industrial evaporite pans, probably for sea-salt production, upper right. Landsat 7 image.

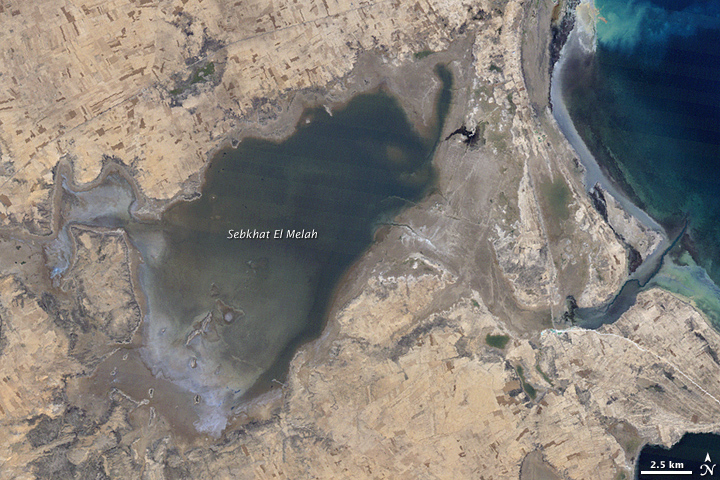
Sebkhat El Melah in 1987, flooded. Landsat 5 image.

A sabkha (Arabic: سبخة) is a predominantly coastal, supratidal mudflat or sandflat in which evaporite-saline minerals accumulate as the result of a semiarid to arid climate. Sabkhas are gradational between land and intertidal zone within restricted coastal plains just above normal high-tide level. Within a sabkha, evaporite-saline mineral sediments typically accumulate below the surface of mudflats or sandflats. Evaporite-saline minerals, tidal-flood, and aeolian deposits characterize many sabkhas found along modern coastlines. The accepted type locality for a sabkha is at the southern coast of the Persian Gulf, in the United Arab Emirates. Evidence of clastic sabkhas are found in the geological record of many areas, including the UK and Ireland. Sabkha is a phonetic transliteration of the Arabic root s b ḵ used when talking about any form of salt flat, including salt marshes and salt swamps. A sabkha is also known as a sabkhah, sebkha, or coastal sabkha.

The term sabkha has been used as a general term for any flat area, coastal or interior, where, as the result of evaporation, salt and other evaporite minerals precipitate near or at the surface. The term continental sabkha is used for such environments found within deserts. Because of the confusion created by using sabkha for salt flats and playas, it has been proposed that the usage of this term be abandoned for playas and other intracontinental basins and flats.

== Origin and development ==
=== Abu Dhabi sabkhas ===
The origin and progression of coastal sabkha development at the southern shore of the Persian Gulf was first discussed in detail in the seminal paper by Evans et al. 1969. The southern shoreline of the Persian Gulf is a shallow, low-angle carbonate ramp characterised by an evaporitic supratidal system passing offshore, via a broad carbonate–evaporite intertidal environment, into a carbonate-dominated subtidal system. This is a low-energy setting with a small tidal range (1–2 m (3.3–6.6 ft)) and low wave energy as a result of the limited fetch. High rates of evaporation result in salinities of 45–46 g l^{−1} along the open-marine coast of Abu Dhabi and up to 89 g l^{−1} in more-restricted lagoons. The coast of Abu Dhabi is locally protected from open-marine conditions by a number of peninsulas and offshore shoals and islands associated with the east–west trending Great Pearl Bank.

Groundwater plays a key role in the formation of sabkhas. The phenomenon of groundwater discharging to the surface doesn't always result in visible open water. Instead, the water evaporates upon reaching the surface, leading to the formation of salt deposits. The salt flats of Abu Dhabi are a typical example of this, with the evaporation of water occurring from the capillary fringe – a subsurface layer where groundwater seeps up from a water table – which intersects the surface. This activity has contributed to the creation of an expansive salt flat, covering approximately 36,000 km^{2} (14,000 sq mi).

Much of the chemical content in these flats is attributed to groundwater that seeps to the surface. This seepage results in a concentration of these dissolved substances, which is estimated to be about ten times that found in seawater. The arid conditions of such regions are often characterized by sparse or even completely absent vegetation. This lack of plant cover allows aeolian processes to interact with the phreatic surface to form unique landforms, such as sabkhas.

Due to the minimal vegetation, aeolian activity has the capacity to cause deep erosion into the surface sediments. However, it's unable to displace material below the capillary zone due to the full saturation of this zone preventing its uplift by the wind. As a result, the Earth’s surface in such regions tends to mimic the shape and slope of the underlying water table. The resultant surfaces evolve into vast, flat, discharge areas where the process of evaporation leads to the accumulation of salts. Over time, these accumulations form crusts of a salty nature, characterizing the unique landscape of these regions.

=== Khor lagoon ===
In the khor-lagoon-sabkha model, an initial rise in sea-level floods coastal areas and creates shallow water features. If the features silt up, or the land rises, or the sea level falls, then the trapped water evaporates, leaving a flat salt pan, or sabkha. If the coastal region has irregular topography, then the flooding creates large independent creeks, or khors. A khor is a shallow, subtidal flat or tidal inlet. The inlet may host grey mangroves, depending on whether less saline water is available from wadis or groundwater. As sediment begins to accumulate, the khors become more shallow and form a lagoon, or intertidal flat. The lagoons continue to fill until the lagoon floor is exposed at low tide, and the sabkha begins to form. A sabkha may be inundated during higher than normal spring tides, after rainstorms, or when driving winds push seawater onshore to a depth of a few centimeters. Mature sabkhas are only flooded after heavy rainstorms and may eventually coalesce to form a sabkha coastal plain. These coastal plains are very flat, with reliefs between 10–50 cm (3.9–19.7 in), and their seaward slope can be as little as 1:1,000.

These environments can be found laterally contemporaneous in parallel belts to the coast as well. Coral reefs, barrier islands, and oolite shoals form the barrier with the open shelf. These types of deposits are indicative of higher energy and protect the khor-lagoon environments, allowing for the growth of mangrove swamps and algal and cyano-bacterial mats that prefer the more closed, lower energy environment. Inland of this are the supratidal sabkhas. The sabkhas can be as wide as 15 km (9.3 mi) when seaward of dune fields supplying large amounts of sediment. Sabkhas seaward of low outcrops of Miocene carbonate-evaporites or alluvial fans off the Oman fold and thrust belt can be as narrow as several hundred meters.

=== Dune field ===
If the coast has dune fields, then flooding creates many smaller pools between the crests of the dunes. In some parts of the world, these lakes can also form in inland deserts, filled by rain or a rising water table from underground aquifers.

For example, large parts of the Empty Quarter in Saudi Arabia and the southern UAE consist of patterns of high drifting barchan dunes alternating with continental sabkha filled with salt flats. In some places, the continental sabkha connect to form long accessible corridors into the desert.

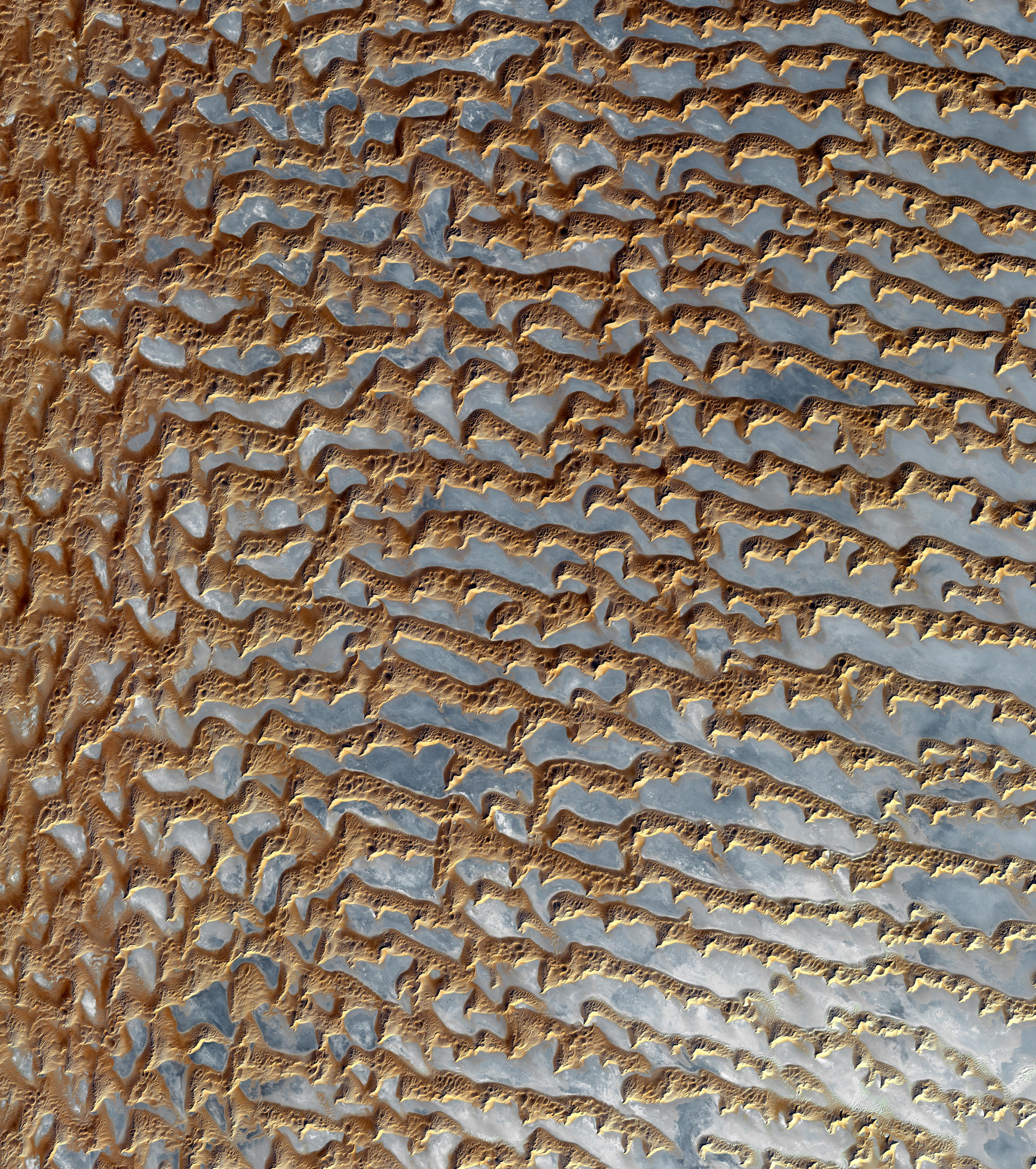
Dunes and salt flats in the Empty Quarter

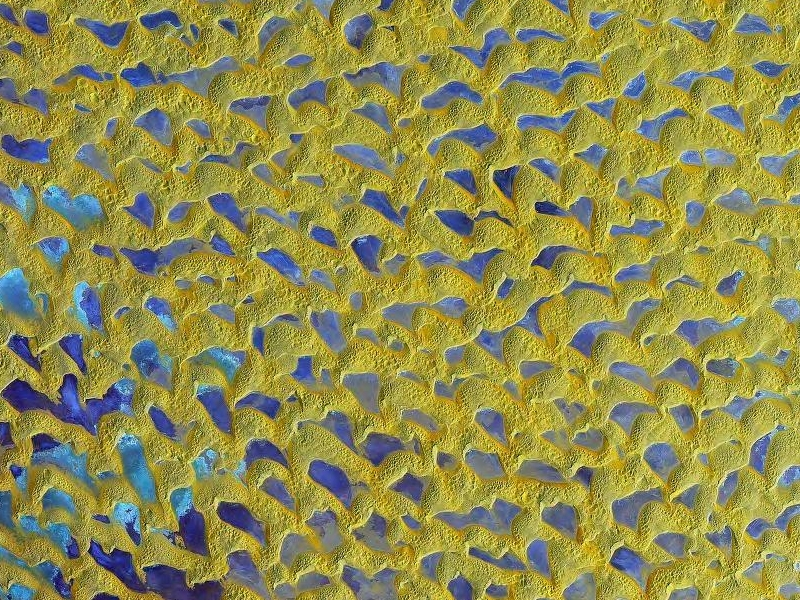
Dunes and salt flats in the Empty Quarter

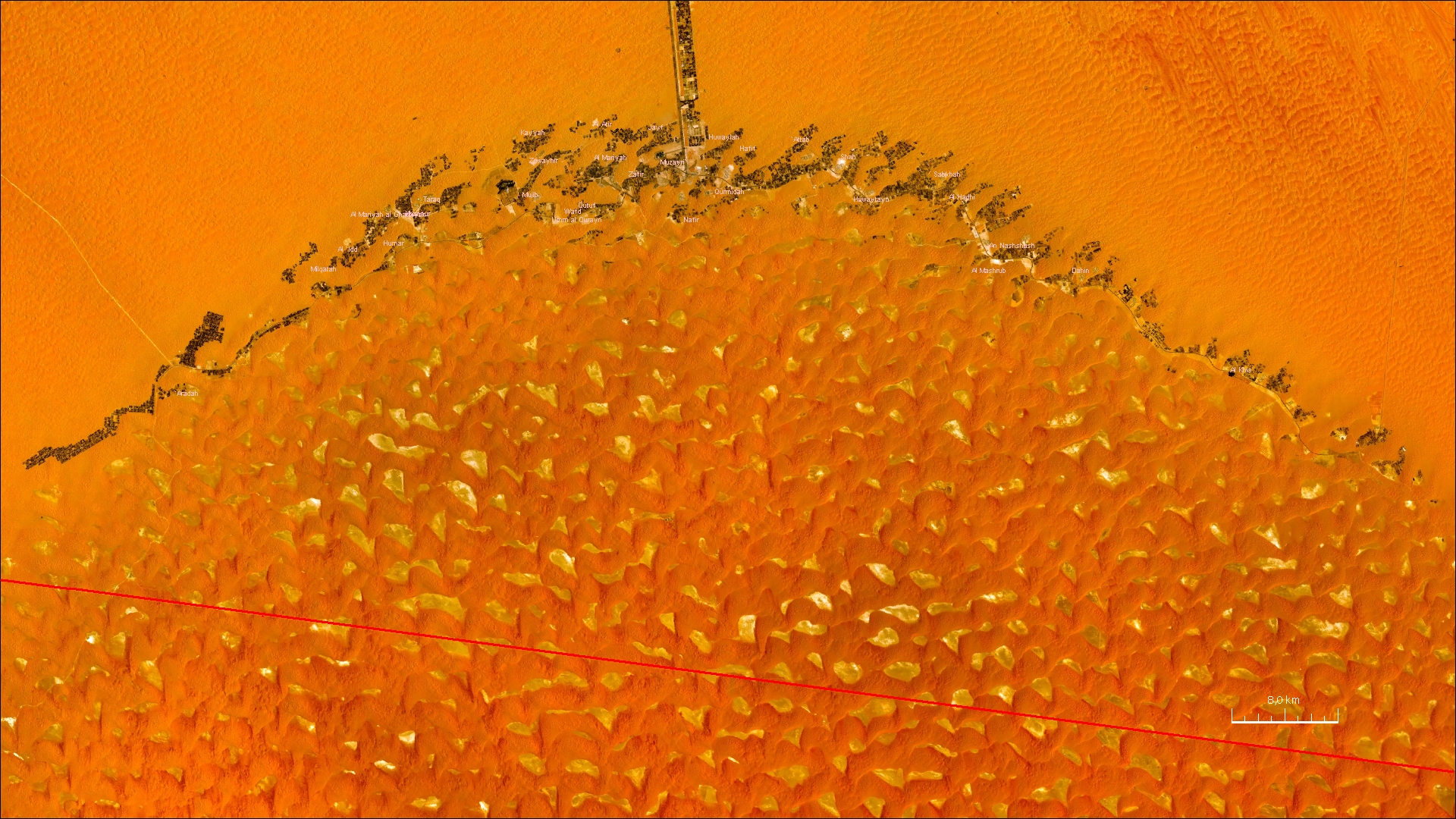
Dunes and salt flats south of the crescent-shaped Liwa Oasis (UAE).

The third picture shows the area south of the crescent-shaped Liwa Oasis in the southern UAE. The picture is about 80 km (50 mi), with each continental sabkha about 2–3 km (1.2–1.9 mi) long and 1 km (0.62 mi) wide. White deposits of salt cover the surface of the continental sabkha. The Moreeb Dune, rising 120 m (390 ft) above the continental sabkha, is located roughly in the middle of the picture. The border between Saudi Arabia and the UAE is shown in red.

The floor of a continental sabkha is usually a hard-packed combination of sand, mud and salt. It is easy to walk or drive 4x4 vehicles across the dry, continental sabkha. However, after rains and flash-floods, the continental sabkha fill with shallow layers of water, and cannot be crossed until they dry out to form a new crust. When the ground is partly dried, a salt crust forms over soft mud or hollow cavities, and vehicles become stuck after breaking through the crust.

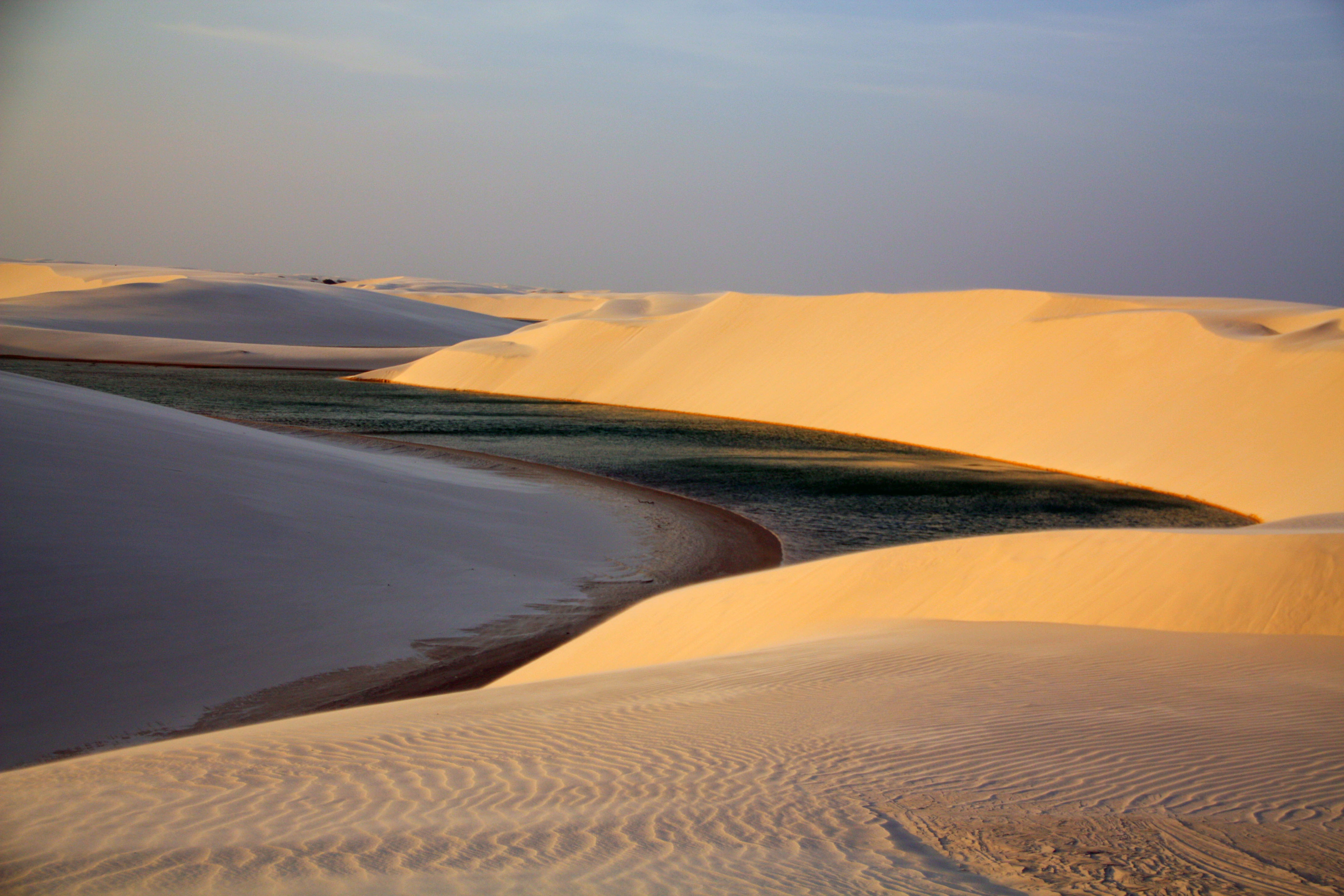
Flooded dune field in the Lençóis Maranhenses National Park (Brazil).

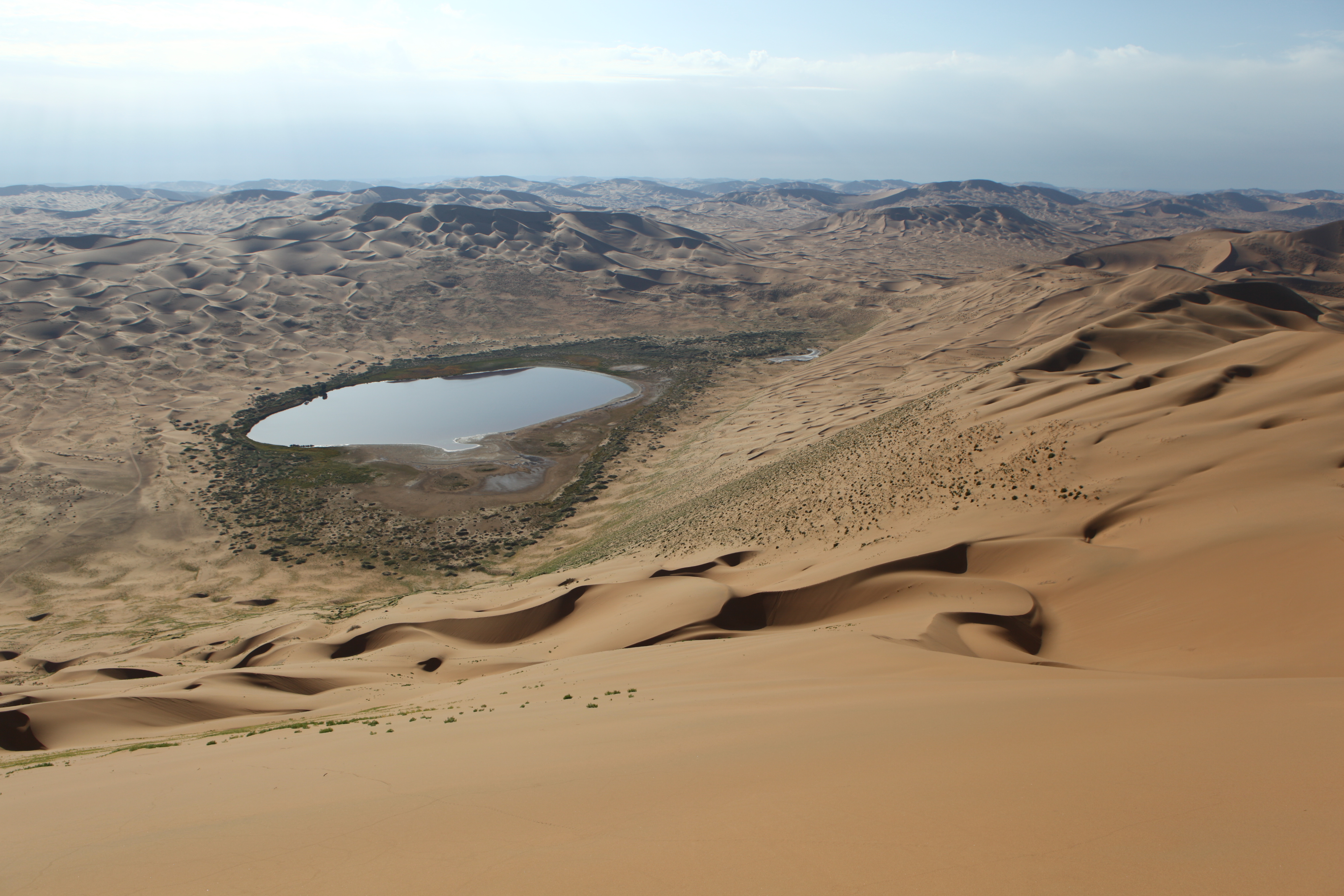
Flooded dune field in the Badain Jaran Desert (China).

== Climate effects ==
The climate is one of the main factors in sabkha development. Rainfall in this arid region usually occurs as thunderstorms and averages 4 cm (1.6 in)/year. Temperatures can range in excess of 50 °C (122 °F) to as low as 0 °C (32 °F). Humidity is linked to the wind direction, with humidity as low as 20% in the mornings from off the dry interior and building in the afternoon as a strong, onshore wind prevail. At night, relative humidity of 100% can lead to dense fogs. Water temperatures vary by depth with shallow water being as much as 10 °C (50 °F) warmer. These high temperatures drive high rates of evaporation in the Persian Gulf, as much as 124 cm (49 in)/year leading salinity to increase in the shallow lagoons to as much as 70 ppt. The net rate of evaporation from the sabkha can be as much as an order of magnitude less and has averaged 6 cm (2.4 in) for the last 4,000 to 5,000 years. The reasons for this are that the sabkha surface is not a free-water surface, the high humidity during the night, and vertical stratification of the air column. Despite the loss of water due to evaporation, the groundwater, never deeper than 1.5 m (4.9 ft), flows seawards and is recharged by continental waters, rainstorms, and the northwest "shamal” gale-force winds that create waves of greater height than the intertidal height and drive water as much as 5 km (3.1 mi) inland over the sabkha to a depth of a few centimeters.

The climate variations lead to the very dynamic nature of a sabkha. Halite is deposited on the surface of the sabkha and gypsum and aragonite precipitate in the subsurface via capillary action from brines brought up from the water table. In drier parts of the sabkha the gypsum can be altered to anhydrite and the aragonite can be dolomitized diagenetically. Thermal contraction at night and expansion during the day leads to concave polygonal pans as the edges have been upturned, in part due to growth of evaporites wedging the crack apart. Below this is a gypsum mush where nodules of anhydrite and other sulfates may develop. These might also form a “chicken wire” crystalline structure. Below this are the intertidal deposits typified by laminated, organic-rich muds formed by the microbial mats that grade downward into more bioturbated muds. The subtidal facies show carbonate grainstones and lagoonal muds.

These facies sequences, except for the halite that is frequently re-dissolved when wetted, can easily be preserved. Factors enabling preservation include the progradation of the sabkha with sedimentation rates of 1 m (3.3 ft)/1,000 years and the creation of Stokes surfaces. These surfaces are created by the deflation of the sabkha surface that is related to the level of the groundwater table acting as a local base level.

== Hydrocarbon reservoirs ==
Sabkha deposits are believed to form some of the major subsurface hydrocarbon reservoirs in the Middle East (and elsewhere). The source of these hydrocarbons (both gas and oil) may be the microbial mats and mangrove paleosoils, found in the sabkha sequence, that have a total organic carbon of up to 8.2% and hydrogen indices typical of marine type II kerogens.

Some ancient analogs include immediate subsurface formations such as the Permian Khuff Formation, Jurassic Arab and Hith anhydrites, and Tertiary sedimentary rocks. Similar deposits are also found in the Ordovician Williston Basin, the Permian Basin in Texas, as well as the Jurassic Gulf of Mexico. Modern sabkhas are present in varying form along the coasts of North Africa, Baja California, and at Shark Bay in Australia.

== Geotechnical engineering ==
Execution of construction and civil engineering works in sabkhas must overcome a number of geotechnical engineering issues. Sabkha soils are often distinguished by their low strength, as the concentrated salt solutions found in sabkha brines can weaken the soil structure. In addition, the extreme climatic conditions under which sabkha deposits form – such as substantial temperature fluctuations and recurrent cycles of wetting and drying – can induce instability in these soils, and some minerals that act as binding agents, or 'cements', in these soils have a high solubility, which can potentially reduce the overall structural integrity.

Coastal sabkhas are composed predominantly of minerals such as calcite, dolomite, and gypsum. These are accompanied by smaller quantities of anhydrite, magnesite, halite, and carnalite, as well as various other sulfates and chlorides. The groundwater in these areas is characterized by its high salinity, with sodium chloride levels potentially reaching up to 23%. This saline water often resides close to the ground level. Notably, the sodium chloride concentration can be substantial enough to pose a risk of corrosion.

Conversely, the mineral composition within inland sabkhas tends to be more variable when compared to their coastal counterparts. The precipitated minerals within the soil of these inland sabkhas depend significantly on the specific composition of the local groundwater. Thus, the geological and chemical composition of these environments may differ widely based on regional groundwater characteristics.

Techniques used to improve sabkha soils for construction purposes include dynamic compaction.

== See also ==
- Badain Jaran Desert – Desert in China
- Chott el Hodna – Endorheic salt lake in Algeria
- Garabogazköl
- Lençóis Maranhenses National Park – National park in Maranhão, Brazil
- Sabkhat Matti – Dry lake between Saudi Arabia and the United Arab Emirates
- Salt pan
