= Emsteel =

Emirati material production company

EMSTEEL
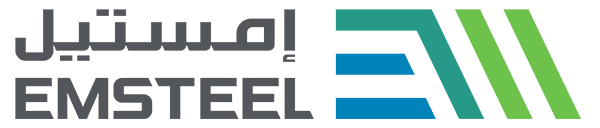
- Type: Public
- Traded as: ADX: EMSTEEL
- Industry: Steel; Building materials
- Founded: 2005; 21 years ago (as Arkan Building Materials); 2021; 5 years ago (as merged entity)
- Headquarters: Abu Dhabi, United Arab Emirates
- Area served: Worldwide
- Key people: Saeed Ghumran Al Remeithi (Group CEO)
- Products: Rebar; Wire rod Heavy sections Cement; Clinker; Concrete blocks Pipes
- Owner: ADQ (87.5%)
- Website: emsteel.com

EMSTEEL (legally EMSTEEL PJSC) is an Emirati industrial steel and building materials company headquartered in Abu Dhabi. It is a publicly listed public joint stock company on the Abu Dhabi Securities Exchange and is majority-owned by ADQ, the Abu Dhabi government's holding company, through its industrial subsidiary Senaat.

== History ==
Emsteel was formed through the merger of two Abu Dhabi-based companies: Emirates Steel Industries, established in 1998, and Arkan Building Materials, founded in 2005.

In May 2021, Senaat, then a subsidiary of ADQ, submitted an offer to combine its wholly-owned subsidiary Emirates Steel with Arkan Building Materials. Under the terms of the deal, Arkan issued a convertible instrument that converted into approximately 5.1 billion shares at AED 0.798 per share, leaving Senaat with 87.5% of the combined entity. Following a shareholder vote on August 9, 2021, and the receipt of regulatory approvals, it was merged under the interim name Emirates Steel Arkan.

In September 2024, the group was renamed as EMSTEEL. Later that month, EMSTEEL was appointed as Co-Chair of the Alliance for Industry Decarbonisation (AFID), led by the International Renewable Energy Agency (IRENA), alongside Siemens Energy, replacing Tata Steel within the alliance leadership role. In October 2024, EMSTEEL announced the completion of a green hydrogen pilot project, developed with Masdar, to produce green steel.

== Operations ==
EMSTEEL operates 16 plants with an annual production capacity of approximately 3.5 million tonnes of steel and 4.6 million tonnes of cement.

It operates through two primary divisions: Emirates Steel and Emirates Cement. The Emirates Steel division runs a steel complex in Abu Dhabi which uses a carbon capture system. Its main products include reinforcing bar (rebar), wire rods, and heavy sections. The Emirates Cement division includes subsidiaries such as the Al Ain Cement Factory, Emirates Blocks, and Anabeeb, which manufacture cement, clinker, concrete blocks, and pipes.
