= Abu Dhabi Developmental Holding Company =

Sovereign wealth fund

- ADQ was headquartered in the Capital Gate building
- Native name: شركة أبوظبي التنموية القابضة ش.م.ع
- Type: Private Joint Stock Company (Government owned)
- Industry: Diversified investments
- Founded: 2018; 8 years ago
- Headquarters: Abu Dhabi, United Arab Emirates
- Key people: Tahnoun bin Zayed Al Nahyan (chairman)
- AUM: AED 732 billion (US$157 billion) (2022)
- Owner: Government of Abu Dhabi
- Number of employees: 77,000
- Subsidiaries: Abu Dhabi National Energy Company (TAQA); Emirates Nuclear Energy Corporation (ENEC); Emirates Water and Electricity Company (EWEC); Louis Dreyfus Company; LuLu Group International; Etihad Airways; Etihad Rail; Abu Dhabi Airports Company; AD Ports Group; Wizz Air Abu Dhabi; Abu Dhabi Securities Exchange; Abu Dhabi National Exhibitions Company; Aramex
- Website: www.adq.ae

Abu Dhabi Developmental Holding Company PJSC (Arabic: شركة أبوظبي التنموية القابضة ش.م.ع), branded ADQ after 2020, was a short-lived sovereign wealth fund based in Abu Dhabi. It was established in 2018 as a comparatively low-profile state-owned entity, acronymized ADDH at the time. After rebranding in 2020, it emerged as a major global investor. In 2023, it was among the world's top 10 sovereign funds by volume of investments. It was folded into L'imad in early 2026.

== History ==
In 2019, the Abu Dhabi government transferred to ADDH its shareholdings in twofour54, Abu Dhabi Power, Abu Dhabi Health Services Company (SEHA), Daman, AD Ports Group, Etihad Rail, Abu Dhabi Airports Company, Abu Dhabi National Exhibition Centre, ZonesCorp, Abu Dhabi Media Company, and Abu Dhabi Sewerage Service Company, followed in 2020 with Image Nation, National Marine Dredging Company, Emirates Water and Electricity Company, General Holding Corporation (Senaat), Abu Dhabi Securities Exchange and Emirates Nuclear Energy Corporation, and in late 2022 with Etihad Airways.

Also in 2020, ADQ created Wizz Air Abu Dhabi, a majority-owned joint venture with Wizz Air. That same year, it acquired a 20 percent stake in retail group LuLu Group International and a 50 percent stake in Al Dahra Agricultural Company, a 22 percent stake (now 63.16 percent) in Aramex, and a significant stake in Louis Dreyfus Company. As of late 2023, ADQ had $159 billion in total assets.

As of 2021, the chairman of ADQ was Tahnoun bin Zayed Al Nahyan.

In 2024, ADQ and the government of Egypt signed a deal for the ADQ to invest $35 billion in developing Ras el-Hekma on Egypt's Mediterranean coast. The deal grants ADQ the right to develop 130 million square metres of land, and is the largest foreign investment deal in Egypt's history.

In January 2026, ADQ was folded into L'imad (لِعماد), a separate sovereign wealth entity associated with Abu Dhabi crown prince Khaled bin Mohamed Al Nahyan.

== See also ==
- International Holding Company
- ADIA
- Mubadala
- Abu Dhabi Investment Office
