= Sanitation in Dubai =

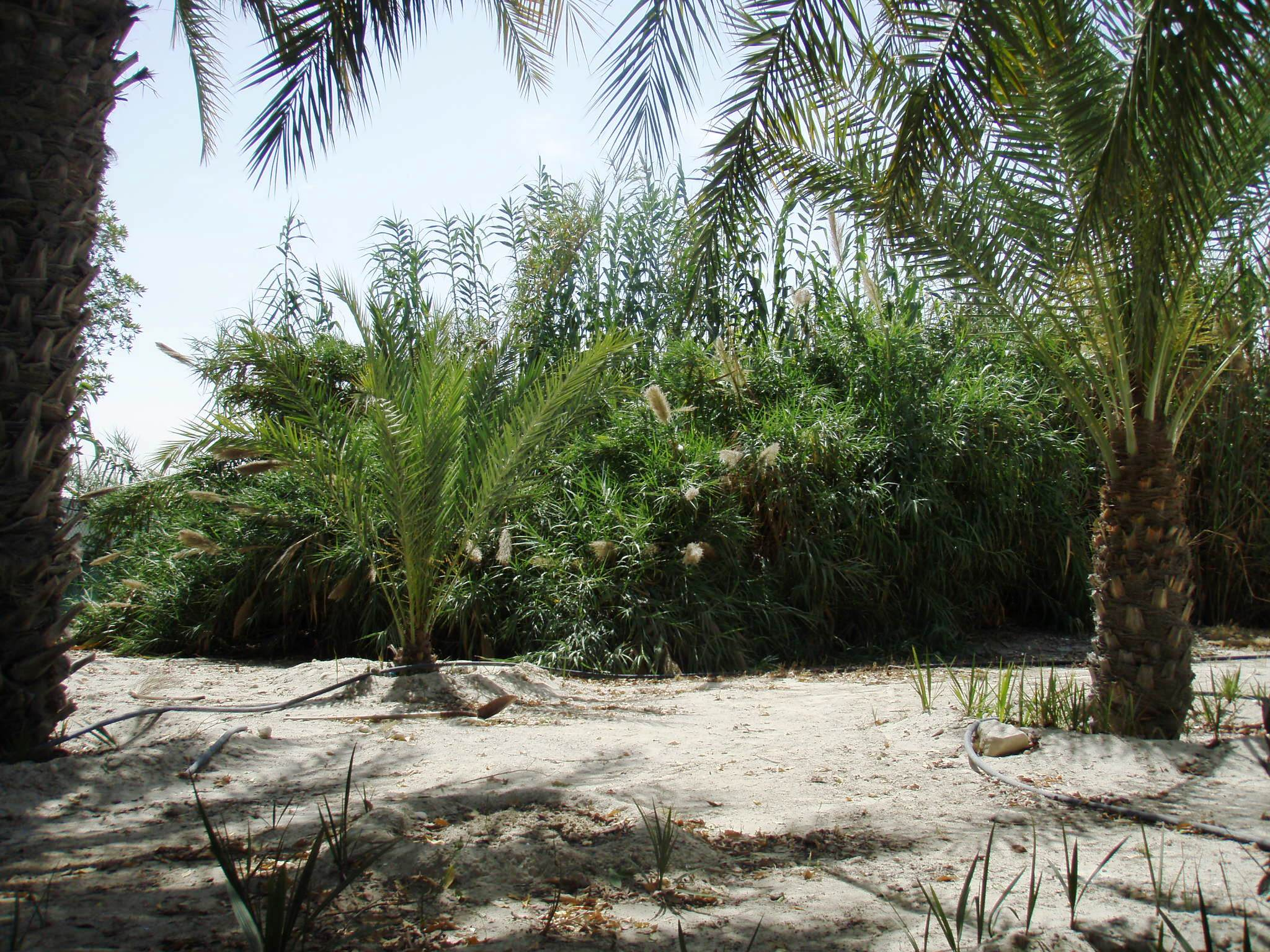
Palm trees irrigated with treated wastewater in a wetland of Dubai Municipality

Sanitation in Dubai involves planning and managing Dubai's waste and sewage management infrastructure, within the United Arab Emirates. Before 2007, there were many problems with sewage capacity and connectivity but in the early 2010s Dubai Municipality has greatly expanded capacity. Since then, Dubai had 1,200 km of sewerage pipeline network. An additional 80 km was added in 2011 to connect Dubai Industrial City.

== Sanitation infrastructure ==
Dubai Municipality maintains two main sanitation plants, one in Al Awir, and one in Jebel Ali. Several smaller sewage treatment plants around the emirate are also operated by private operators to serve specific districts or neighbourhoods.

=== Al Awir Plant ===
The sewage plant in Al Awir is one of the main areas of wastewater treatment in Dubai. It has been significantly expanded in recent years. The first phase of the plant has a designed capacity of 260,000 m^{3} per day but by December 2007, it was dealing with almost 500,000 m^{3} per day. The second phase of the plant added 65,000 m^{3} of capacity and was commissioned in January 2008. The third phase of the plant was under study in 2007 and adds an extra 80,000 m^{3} capacity.

=== Jebel Ali plant ===
The first two phases of the Jebel Ali plant were completed in April 2009 and it has begun operations, easing pressure on the Al Awir plant. The second phase was completed in October 2010. The odour treatment plant was also completed. The project cost over 1,500,000,000 AED, and covers an area of 670 hectares. It has the capacity to process 300,000 m^{3} of waste water per day. A sewage water pumping station and pumping lines are being created as a second project at a cost 580,000,000 AED. A sewage pumping station and the pumping lines linking up to the main treatment plant at Jebel Ali are being built at a cost of 191,000,000 AED. In 2011, the Jebel Ali Sewage Treatment Plant was selected as the Water Reuse Project of the Year as part of the annual MEED Quality Awards.

=== Sanitation Practices in Residential and Commercial Buildings ===
Dubai's sanitation ecosystem extends beyond wastewater infrastructure and includes building-level hygiene practices, particularly in residential towers, villas, hospitality facilities, and commercial properties. Due to Dubai's desert climate and high levels of dust accumulation, sanitation management often includes deep cleaning, disinfection of high-touch surfaces, HVAC and AC duct hygiene, mold prevention, and periodic steam sanitization. Such practices are commonly used to improve indoor environmental quality and reduce dust, allergen, and microbial buildup.

=== Others ===
- Eagle Electromechanical / Al Hijaz Mechanical Equipment has designed, built and operated more than 100 wastewater treatment projects in the UAE since 1985. These include the MBR, such as in the 25,000 cmd Dubai Sports City plant, a 30,000 cmd extended aeration plant in the Gardens, 12,500 cmd SBR in Al Quoz, MBBR's and others.
- Concorde-Corodex has membrane bioreactor sewage treatment plants on both the Palm Jumeirah and in Dubai International City.
- Metito operates and maintains a 2,000 m^{3} per day sequencing batch reactor sewage treatment plant that treats sewage collected from the Sky Courts complex.
- Concordia operates a sewage treatment plant serving "The Galleries" development in downtown Jebel Ali.

== Sewage issues ==
During Dubai's economic boom in the 2000s, the city's growth meant that it was stretching its existing sewage treatment infrastructure to its limits. Sewage from areas of Dubai not connected to the municipal piped network at the time was collected daily from thousands of holding tanks across the city and driven by tankers to the city's only sewage treatment plant at Al-Awir. Because of the long queues and delays, several tanker drivers resorted to illegally dumping the raw sewage into storm drains or behind dunes in the desert, resulting in much controversy. Sewage dumped into storm drains flowed directly into the Persian Gulf, near the city's prime swimming beaches. Doctors warned that tourists using the beaches ran the risk of contracting serious illnesses like typhoid and hepatitis.

Dubai's municipality says that it is committed to trying to catch the culprits and has imposed fines of up to $25,000 as well as threatening to confiscate tankers if dumping persists. The municipality maintains that test results show samples of the water are "within the standard".

In 2013, it was reported that the Jebel Ali plant receives 70% of sewage through the city's sewage network, while the remaining 30% comes from sewage trucks.

Due to the 2024 UAE floods, a new, 277 million-Dh sewage system was completed on June 18, 2025.

== See also ==
- Water supply and sanitation in Abu Dhabi
