= Moreeb Dune =

Sand dune in the United Arab Emirates

Coordinates: 22°58′46.8″N 53°47′10.4″E

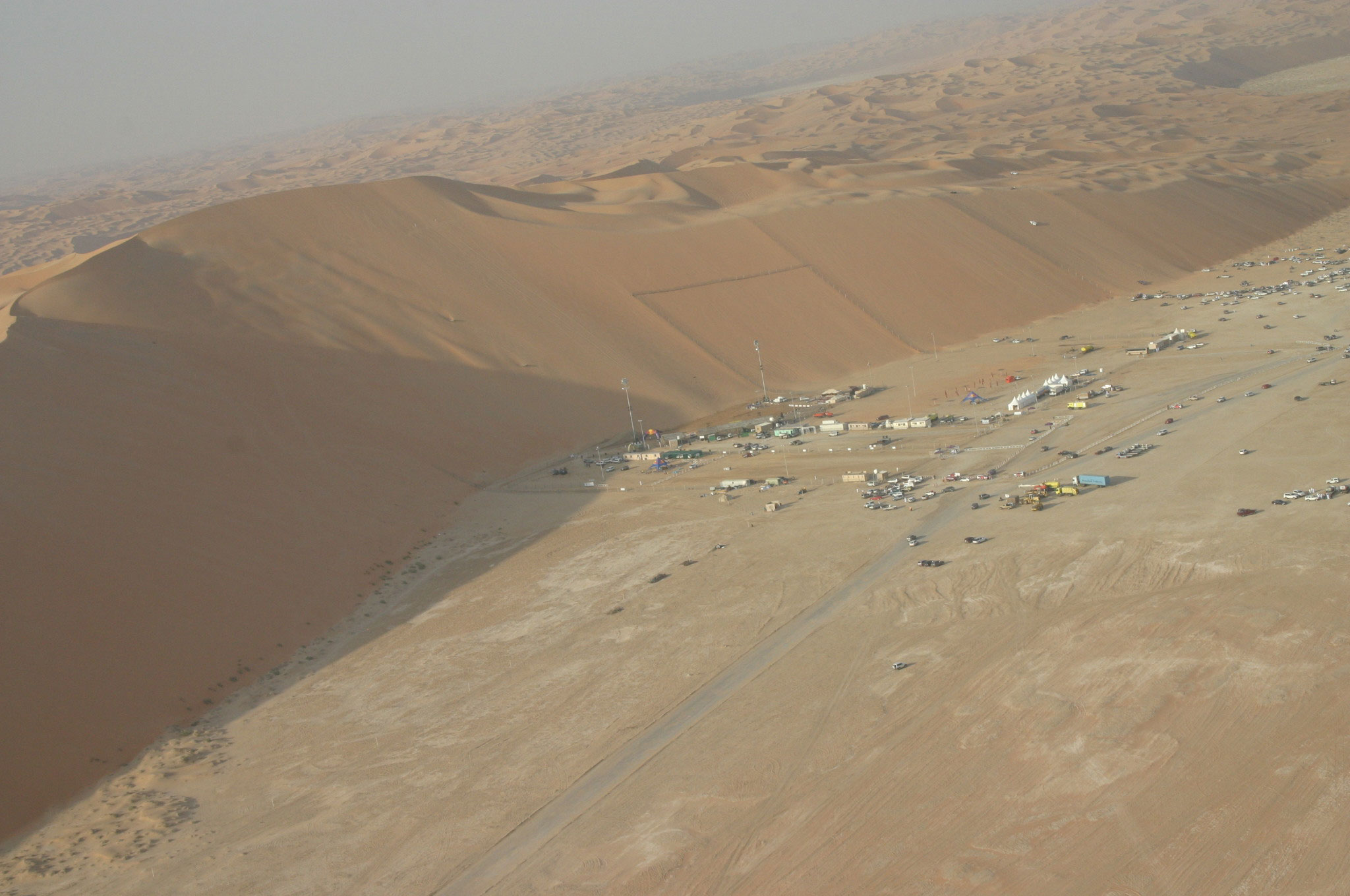
Moreeb Dune at Liwa

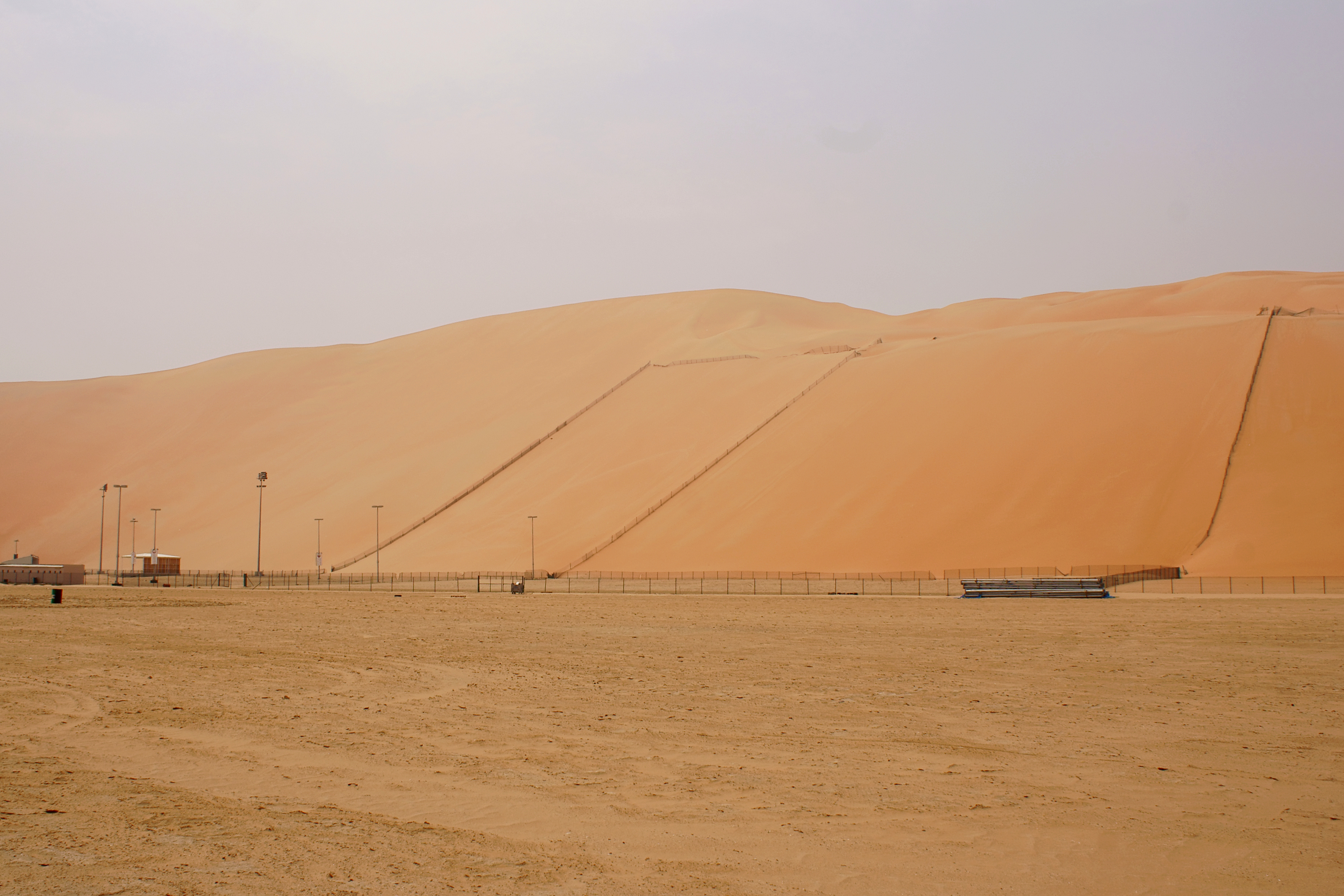

Moreeb Dune or Tal Moreeb (تل مرعب Mor'ib Hill) is a large sized sand dune located in proximity of Liwa Oasis at the Empty Quarter desert in the United Arab Emirates. With a reported 50 degree slipface, and height of 300 metres, the dune is popular for organised Liwa Moreeb Dune Festival and drag races competitions. Moreeb Hill is the tallest dune in the UAE, and one of the largest hill climbs in the world. Moreeb Dune is one of the highest sand hills in the world. The dune is 1600 meters long.

== Geography ==
Moreeb Dune is located in the United Arab Emirates, 25 km south of Liwa Oasis. The total distance from Abu Dhabi to Moreeb Dune is about 250 km.

== See also ==
- Liwa Oasis
- Sabkha
- Liwa Moreeb Dune Festival
