= Water supply and sanitation in Abu Dhabi =

The three cities of Abu Dhabi Emirate within the United Arab Emirates – the coastal city Abu Dhabi itself (more than one million inhabitants) as well as the inland oases Al Ain (2 million inhabitants) and Liwa (about 100 thousand inhabitants) – receive their drinking water supply entirely from desalinated seawater.

== Water resources ==
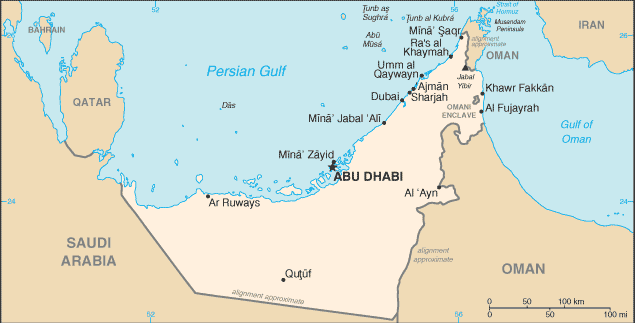
Map of the United Arab Emirates showing Abu Dhabi, Al Ain and QuTúF, a village in Liwa oasis.

There are two sources of water in the UAE: desalinated seawater and groundwater. While groundwater is used for agriculture in Al Ain and Liwa, drinking water is provided entirely from desalinated seawater across the Emirates. In 2008, groundwater contributed 71% to total water demand for all purposes, desalinated water 24% and treated wastewater 5%.

=== Seawater desalination ===
There were eight seawater desalination plants in Abu Dhabi owned and operated by eight joint ventures: Tawilah A, Tawilah B, the five Umm al Nar plants and the Al Mirfa plant. These joint ventures between the government and foreign companies, which are allowed to own up to 40% of the shares, are called Independent Water & Power Producers (IWPPs). They operate under Build-Own-Operate (BOO) contracts with the government and their energy is supplied by fossil fuels. In the model green city called Masdar City, four smaller pilot desalination plants that will use solar power are nearing completion as of early 2015.

=== Groundwater ===
90% of groundwater in Abu Dhabi Emirate is saline, in some cases up to eight times as much as seawater. There are only two freshwater aquifers. Natural groundwater recharge is estimated at 300 million cubic meters per year. Brackish groundwater is mostly used for the irrigation of date palms which are relatively salt-tolerant. Recharge dams have been built on wadis in order to prevent flood water to flow into the sea, recharging it instead to aquifers. Unplanned and uncontrolled groundwater withdrawals, especially for agriculture and forestry, total over 2,000 million cubic meters per year and have resulted in declining groundwater levels and quality.

=== Groundwater recharge ===
Artificial groundwater recharge with desalinated water was piloted in 2003 near the Liwa Oasis and construction of large-scale recharge facilities has begun in 2008. The objective was to create a 90-day reserve instead of the current 48-hour reserve for drinking water supply, in order to protect the emirate against the risk of terrorist attacks or oil spills that would shut down the entire water supply. Recharge will occur during summer when the desalination plants generate surplus freshwater. Desalination plants in Abu Dhabi use the multi-stage flash distillation technology which uses steam from thermal power plants as an energy source. Their water production thus is proportional to electricity production and reaches a peak during the summer when electricity production is highest to power air conditioning. The recharge scheme has been completed in December 2017.

=== Sanitation ===
Approximately 550,000 cubic metres of wastewater is generated in Abu Dhabi every day and treated in 20 wastewater treatment plants. Almost all of the wastewater is being reused to irrigate green spaces. While most wastewater treatment plants are publicly owned and operated, four large new plants have been built by joint ventures under build–operate–transfer (BOOT) arrangements. One such contract for two plants was awarded in 2008, one in Abu Dhabi itself with a capacity of 300,000 cubic meters per day and one in Al Ain with a capacity of 130,000 cubic meter per day. Contracts for two other plants were awarded to Biwater under a similar structure. A Strategic Tunnel Enhancement Programme (STEP) was completed around 2014, establishing a tunnel that will comprise 40 kilometres of deep sewerage tunnelling and two new large pumping stations to relieve Abu Dhabi.

In Masdar City green spaces and agriculture near the city are to be irrigated with grey water and reclaimed water.

== Water use ==
About half of the annual water production from all sources is used for irrigation of green spaces, as well as in agriculture. The other half is used for domestic uses. Freshwater use per capita is about 650 litres per day, including water supplied for the irrigation of green spaces.

As of 2009, in Al Ain "due to constraints on both the transmission and distribution networks, up to 45% of customers [were] on a restricted [intermittent] supply".

== History ==
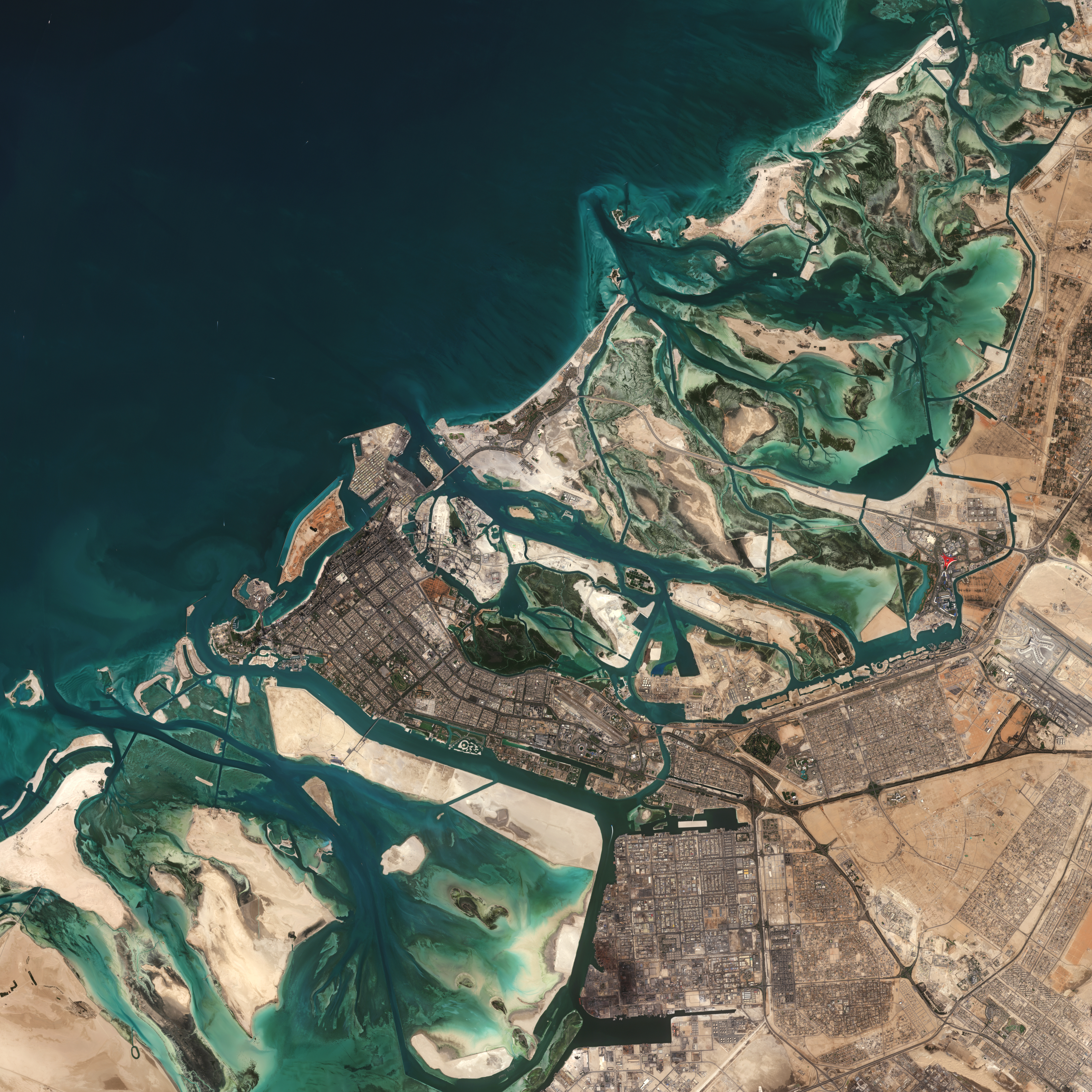
Satellite view of Abu Dhabi.

Abu Dhabi has witnessed an explosion of wealth and population since its independence in 1971 and the oil boom of 1973. Before, groundwater was the only source of water supply. It was very scarce since there is little recharge and most of the aquifers are highly saline. It was only through seawater desalination that the growth of Abu Dhabi became possible. Seawater desalination used thermal technologies that couple desalination with power production. Water was provided free of charge. The plants were initially owned and operated by the government through the Water and Electricity Department, and financing was provided by the state from oil revenues.

Sector reform

In the mid-1990s, the government decided to reorganize the water and electricity sector. The reform was inspired by the pro-private sector and pro-competition climate reigning during the 1990s, and it was implemented through foreign advisors. The reform of both sectors was based on the principle of unbundling production, transmission and distribution:

- Production of electricity and desalinated water was to be the responsibility of a private company,
- Transmission of bulk water to Al Ain and Liwa Oasis was to be done by a public asset holding company and a private operating company,
- Distribution was to be in the hands of two public companies, one for Abu Dhabi and Liwa, and the other for Al Ain.

The sector was to be regulated by a public agency with a certain degree of autonomy from the government. The new structure was formally adopted through Law No (2) Concerning the Regulation of the Water and Electricity Sector in the Emirate of Abu Dhabi passed in 1998. The holding company ADWEA and the regulator, the Regulation and Supervision Bureau (RSB), were functionally established shortly afterwards. In 2000 the government signed the first contract for a private power and desalination plant. The sanitation sector was initially left out of the reform and remained a responsibility of the Abu Dhabi Municipality, despite heavy investments that were required for wastewater treatment and reuse. Only in 2005 a separate sanitation operator, Abu Dhabi Sewerage Services Company, was established.

Environmental awareness and water conservation

In the 2000s, the protection of the environment gradually became more important in Abu Dhabi. In 2005 the Emirate created the Environment Agency, which established a Strategic Water Master Plan published in 2009. When presenting the Master Plan, the chairman of the Environment Agency said that the future concerning water conservation would be very challenging unless action was taken to reduce water consumption, which is among the highest per capita in the world. The Plan describes the current status and the environmental and technical issues related to projections of demand and supply, groundwater abstraction, desalination, water supply and sanitation, irrigation, wastewater treatment and Emirati governance and institutions. The government has run a media campaign to encourage people to save water. It has also distributed water-saving toilets and showerheads free of charge. The Emirate also is in the process of expanding the use of reclaimed water.

== Responsibilities ==
=== Policy ===
Abu Dhabi is ruled by a sheikh. Below him is an Executive Council taking care of day-to-day policy-making. The council is chaired by the Crown Prince. The chairmen of four Departments and a number of Authorities are members of the Executive Council. The government structure is not comparable to the Western structure of Ministries and separate technical authorities under those Ministries. Authorities in Abu Dhabi are rather comparable to Ministries. Water supply and sanitation in Abu Dhabi is the responsibility of the Abu Dhabi Water & Electricity Authority (ADWEA). As mentioned above, the Chairman of ADWEA is a member of the Executive Council and holds the rank of a Minister.

=== Legal framework ===
The sector is governed by two laws:

- Law No (2) of 1998 Concerning the Regulation of the Water and Electricity Sector in the Emirate of Abu Dhabi
- Law No (17) of 2005 Concerning the Establishment of Abu Dhabi Sewerage Services Company (ADSSC).

=== Service provision ===
Eight private Independent Water and Power Production (IWPP) companies operate on the Build-Own-Operate (BOO) formula, producing and selling desalinated water to the Abu Dhabi Water & Electricity Company (ADWEC). ADWEC is owned by the government through ADWEA and is the single buyer of desalinated water and the single supplier of water for the distribution companies. The Abu Dhabi Transmission and Dispatch Company (TRANSCO), a public company, transports water from the desalination plants to the networks of the distribution companies. The Abu Dhabi Distribution Company (ADDC) sells water and electricity to approximately 216,000 customers in Abu Dhabi and its suburbs. The Al Ain distribution company does the same in Al Ain. The Abu Dhabi Sewerage Services Company is a public company in charge of sanitation.

=== Regulation ===
The Regulation and Supervision Bureau (RSB) for the Water and Electricity Sector in the Emirate of Abu Dhabi enforces relevant laws through licensing. It is in charge both of technical regulation and price regulation.

== Tariffs and cost recovery ==
As of January 1, 2015, UAE citizens pay 1.70 Dirham (US$0.46) per cubic meter of water for a very generous first block of consumption, which is set at 700 liters per day for apartments and 7,000 litres per day for villas. Above these amounts, the tariff increases slightly to 1.89 Dirham (US$0.51) per cubic meter. Previously, water was free of charge for UAE citizens. Foreign residents and commercial users were always charged for water, starting at 5.95 Dirham (US$1.61) per cubic meter in the lowest consumption block. The introduction of water tariffs for residents aims at reducing subsidies, encourage the efficient use of water and raise awareness of the importance of reducing consumption. It was combined with a large public relations campaign, as well as advice for customers who want to save water. Even before the change in tariff, bills highlighted water usage beyond a certain level in red and showed the subsidy paid by the state.

The two public distribution companies receive a government subsidy. In turn, they pay a bulk supply tariff reflecting the full economic cost to ADWEC, which in turn pays for the water received from the private IWPPs under Water and Power Purchase Agreements. Bulk supply tariffs are adjusted by the RSB every four years based on maximum allowable revenues.

== Investment and financing ==
Investment in desalination plants is financed by the private sector through BOO contracts. Investment in water distribution and sewerage infrastructure is financed by the government through subsidies to the respective public companies. Investment in both power and water production and distribution was more than US$36 billion from 1999 to 2008. Since power and water are produced and distributed by the same companies, separate figures for investment in water infrastructure are not available.

== See also ==
- Sanitation in Dubai
