= Liwa Moreeb Dune Festival =

United Arab Emirates annual motorsport event

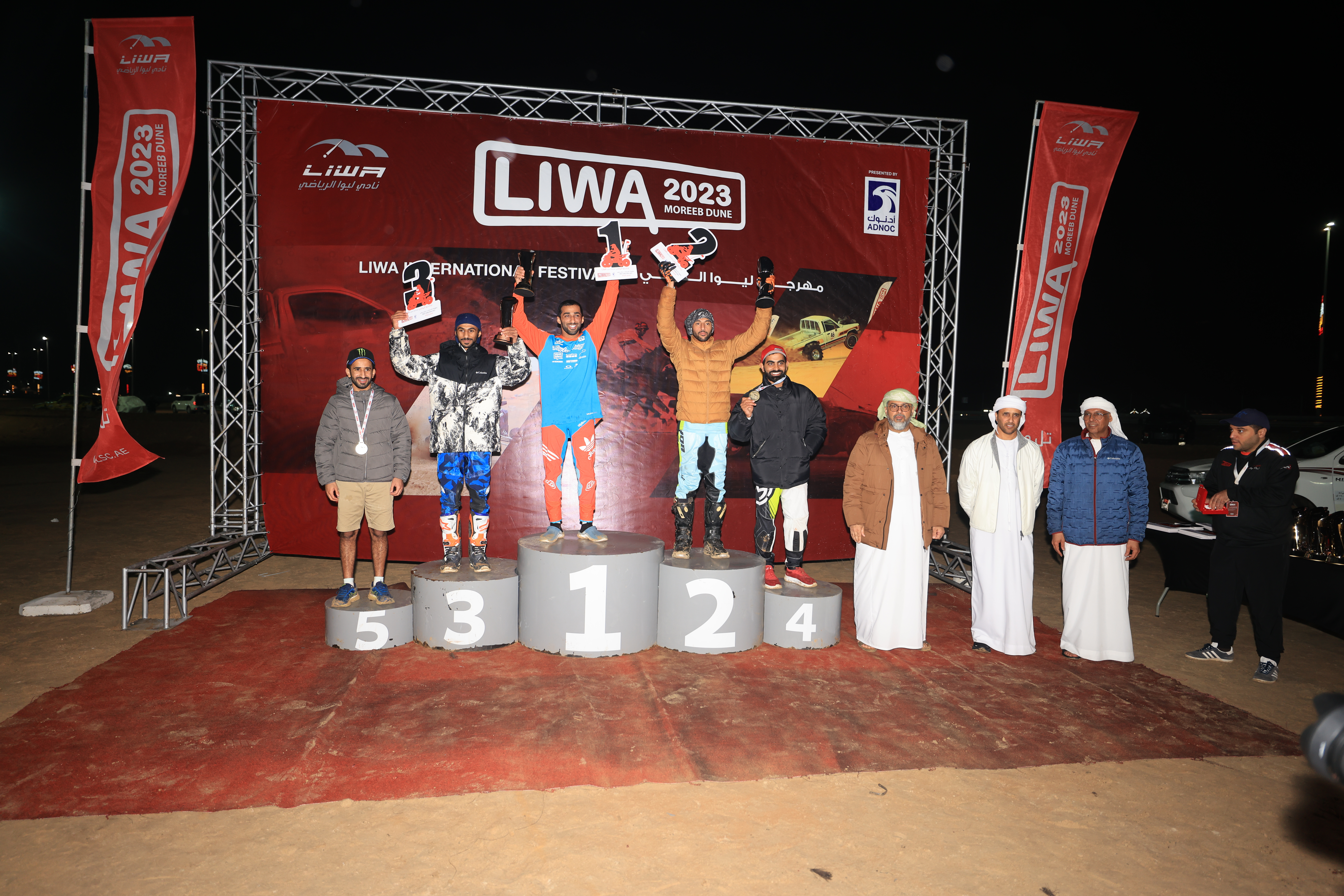
- Sand Drag Bike Race Winners - Liwa International Festival 2023
- Location: Liwa, Abu Dhabi, United Arab Emirates
- Owner: Abu Dhabi Tourism Authority
- Opened: 2004
- Major events: Liwa International Festival
- Website: https://lsc.ae/

The Liwa Moreeb Dune Festival also known as Liwa International Festival is an annual motorsports festival featuring car and the other for bikes uphill drag racing vehicles taking part in a Dune (Moreeb Dune) and other events, held in Liwa Oasis, Abu Dhabi, United Arab Emirates, in late December to early January.

== Events ==
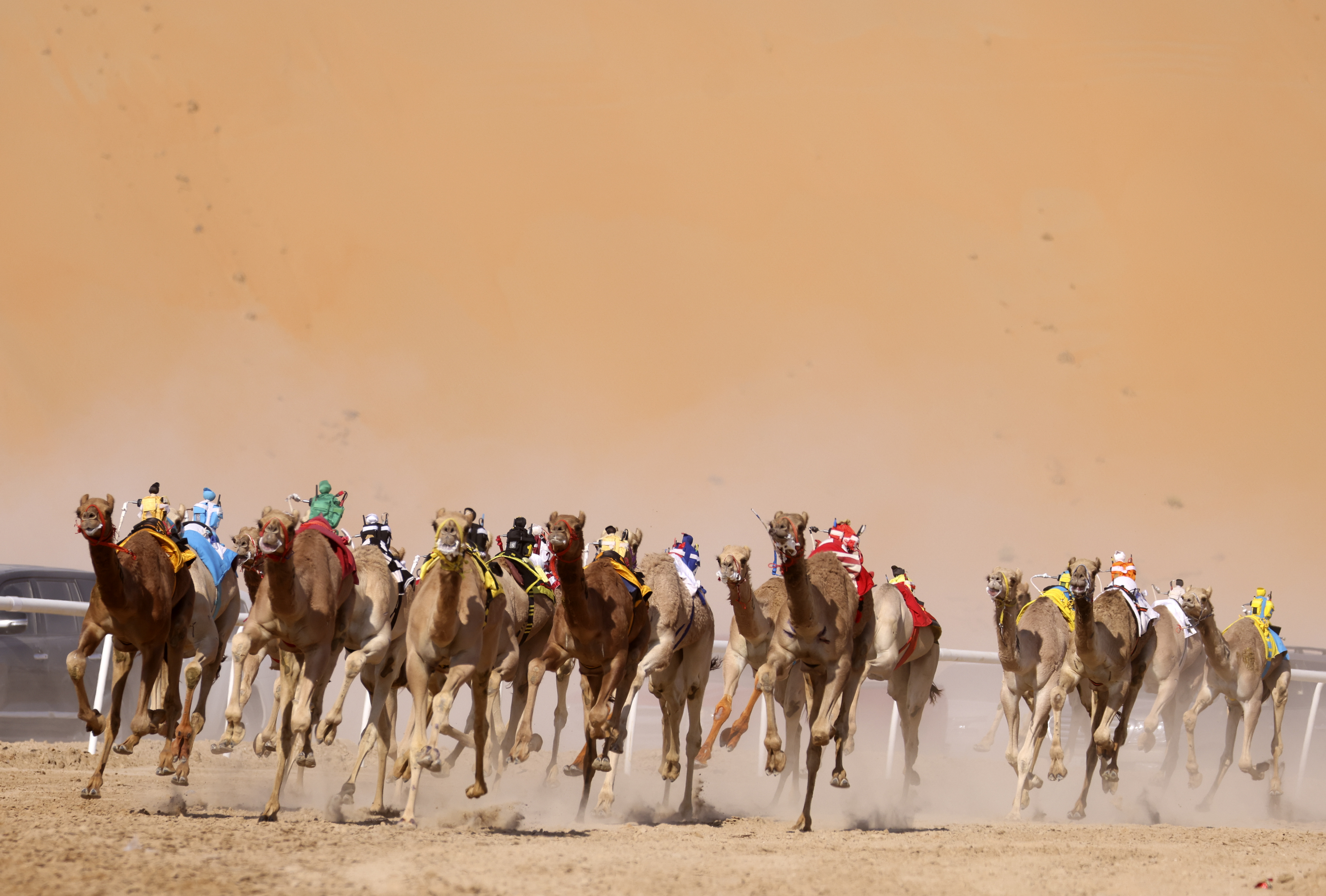
Liwa Sports Club Camel Race in Moreeb Dune, Liwa International Festival 2022.

Liwa International Festival includes a number of sporting and Motorsport competitions that attract participation from international motorsport professionals. The festival also includes Liwa Village activities, including cultural, heritage and artistic activities as well as live entertainment and music. Its races and championships cover motorsports and traditional sports including speed, drag and show races.

The festival begins with a car parade, and concludes with the Moreeb Hill Climbing Championship, which is considered one of the most prominent annual events at the festival, which culminates in a concert and fireworks display on New Year's Eve.

== History ==
In 2001 local Emiratis started competing together and climbing the dunes with their bikes and cars. At that time the challenge was to reach the highest point on the dune.

These motivated Emiratis saw the enormous potential of planning a festival that would honor their passion for motorsports while showcasing the distinctive beauty of the sand of Moreeb Dune. They planned a race that would be thrilling, adventurous, drawing inspiration from traditional racing competitions and the Al Dhafra, Abu Dhabi region's challenging sand dunes.

In 2004, the Government of Abu Dhabi approved and officially announced the establishment of the Abu Dhabi Motors Club (later changed to Liwa Sport Club). After which the first-ever Liwa International Festival officially started with the proper permissions in place, attracting competitors from all over the world who were ready to take on the heart-pounding challenge of racing up the massive sand dunes. Uphill racing, usually referred to as hill climbing, is the practice of racing up high inclines, in this instance, the steep slopes would be the enormous sand dunes of Liwa.

In Liwa 2024, which was held in December 2023 to January 2024, 640,222 visitors attended the festival.
