= Daman (health insurance company) =

UAE insurance company

The National Insurance Company – Daman
- Native name: الشركة الوطنية للتأمين – ضمان
- Type: Public Joint Stock Company
- Industry: Insurance
- Predecessor: National Health Insurance Company – Daman
- Founded: 2005
- Founder: Government of Abu Dhabi and Munich Re
- Headquarters: Abu Dhabi, United Arab Emirates
- Key people: Khaled Bin Shaiban Almehairi (Chairman); Khaled Ateeq Aldhaeri (CEO)
- Products: Health insurance; Corporate insurance; Government healthcare schemes; Employee benefits; Property and Casualty insurance
- Owner: PureHealth
- Number of employees: 2,000+
- Parent: PureHealth
- Website: www.damanhealth.ae

The National Insurance Company – Daman (Arabic: الشركة الوطنية للتأمين – ضمان), commonly known as Daman, is a UAE-based insurance company headquartered in Abu Dhabi, United Arab Emirates. Established in 2005 and operational since May 2006, Daman became the first specialised health insurance company in the UAE and later evolved into the country's largest health insurer by membership size.

The company provides health insurance and related healthcare solutions to more than 3 million members across the UAE and manages one of the country's largest healthcare provider networks, covering more than 3,000 medical facilities.

Daman is part of PureHealth, the UAE's largest integrated healthcare platform, which includes hospitals, laboratories, clinics, pharmacies, healthcare technology companies, and insurance services.

== History ==
=== Establishment ===
Daman was established in 2005 as part of the Government of Abu Dhabi's healthcare reform initiative aimed at introducing mandatory health insurance coverage within the emirate.

The company officially began operations in May 2006 and was formed through a strategic partnership between the Abu Dhabi government and German reinsurance company Munich Re. Under the original ownership structure, the Government of Abu Dhabi held 80% ownership while Munich Re held the remaining 20%.

=== Munich Re partnership ===
Munich Re, founded in Germany in 1880, is one of the world's largest reinsurance companies and is known for underwriting complex global risks including aviation, natural disasters, cyber security, energy infrastructure, and healthcare.

Through its healthcare division Munich Health, Munich Re played a central role in building Daman's insurance infrastructure, underwriting standards, actuarial systems, claims management structures, and international healthcare risk practices.

In 2009, Daman and Munich Re extended their strategic partnership until 2019 after rapid market growth and expansion.

=== Market expansion ===
Following the implementation of mandatory health insurance in Abu Dhabi, Daman experienced rapid growth and became the dominant health insurer within the emirate. By 2009, the company reportedly held approximately 80% of Abu Dhabi's health insurance market.

In 2010, Daman announced that it had surpassed 2 million insured members, becoming one of the Gulf region's fastest-growing health insurers.

During this period, Daman launched multiple insurance programmes including:

- Thiqa programme for Emirati nationals
- Enhanced health insurance plans
- Basic health insurance plans
- SME and corporate health insurance
- International coverage plans

The company also expanded into digital healthcare management, online approvals systems, telemedicine support, mobile applications, and disease management programmes.

== ADQ acquisition ==
In October 2021, Abu Dhabi sovereign wealth holding company ADQ acquired Munich Re's remaining 20% stake in Daman, making the insurer fully owned by Abu Dhabi government entities.

Following the acquisition, Munich Re continued to act as Daman's strategic reinsurance partner and continued supporting underwriting and healthcare insurance services.

ADQ, established in 2018, is one of Abu Dhabi's largest state-owned holding companies and manages investments across sectors including healthcare, energy, logistics, infrastructure, transport, food, and agriculture.

== PureHealth integration ==
In 2022, ADQ announced the consolidation of several healthcare companies into PureHealth, creating the UAE's largest integrated healthcare platform.

As part of the restructuring, Daman became part of PureHealth alongside:

- SEHA
- Yas Clinic Group
- Tamouh Healthcare
- Abu Dhabi Stem Cell Center

PureHealth was created as a vertically integrated healthcare ecosystem combining insurance, hospitals, diagnostics, procurement, laboratories, pharmacies, and healthcare technology under one group.

=== Alpha Dhabi Holding involvement ===
Alpha Dhabi Holding became one of the major shareholders in PureHealth alongside ADQ, International Holding Company (IHC), AH Capital, and Ataa Financial Investments.

Alpha Dhabi Holding is an Abu Dhabi-based investment conglomerate with interests in healthcare, hospitality, construction, energy, and industrial sectors.

== Operations ==
Daman operates across all seven emirates of the UAE and offers a range of insurance products and healthcare services including:

- Government healthcare programmes
- Corporate health insurance
- SME health insurance
- Individual and family insurance
- International healthcare coverage
- Preventive healthcare programmes
- Employee benefits
- Property and Casualty insurance

The company manages one of the UAE's largest healthcare provider networks and offers digital insurance services including:

- Electronic claims systems
- Digital insurance cards
- Mobile applications
- Telemedicine services
- Online approvals systems
- Wellness programmes
- 24/7 customer support

== Market position ==
Daman is considered the UAE's leading health insurer and historically held one of the largest market shares in Abu Dhabi's healthcare insurance sector.

The insurer is widely credited with playing a major role in the implementation and development of mandatory healthcare insurance systems within the UAE.

== See also ==
- PureHealth
- ADQ
- Munich Re
- Alpha Dhabi Holding
- SEHA
- Health insurance
