= Abu Dhabi Investment Office =

Government entity

- مكتب أبوظبي للاستثمار

- The headquarters of the Abu Dhabi Investment Office

Agency overview
- Formed: 2019; 7 years ago
- Jurisdiction: Government of Abu Dhabi
- Headquarters: Abu Dhabi, United Arab Emirates
- Minister responsible: Ahmad Jasim Al Zaabi, Chairman
- Agency executive: Badr Al Olama, Director General
- Website: www.investwithabudhabi.com

The Abu Dhabi Investment Office (ADIO) (Arabic: مكتب أبوظبي للاستثمار) is Abu Dhabi's government investments and special projects entity, with a multifaceted mandate spanning strategic investments, economic development, foreign direct investment (FDI) attraction, and industrial growth.

ADIO offers financial incentives, equity investments, infrastructure support, and regulatory facilitation to global and local companies.

ADIO oversees major economic programs, manages public-private partnership, allocates land through its Musataha division, and administers the Industrial Development Bureau (IDB), which provides energy subsidies to industrial players. Additionally, ADIO facilitates the issuance of Golden Visas and offers concierge services for high-net-worth individual.

== History ==
The Abu Dhabi Investment Office was established in 2019 as a dedicated agency for foreign direct investment (FDI), strategic investments, and investor attraction, aiming to strengthen Abu Dhabi's position as a global business hub. Initially, its primary role was to provide financial incentives, investor facilitation services, and support for businesses seeking to establish operations in the emirate. ADIO focused on key economic sectors such as technology, manufacturing, and renewable energy, offering investment programs to drive economic diversification. Over time, ADIO expanded its responsibilities to include public-private partnerships (PPPs), land allocation through its Musataha division, and oversight of major government-backed investment initiatives.

Since 2023, ADIO's mandate has been significantly enhanced, particularly through its industry cluster programs, designed to propel Abu Dhabi towards a $1 trillion GDP by 2040. These clusters serve as a special economic zone for attracting multinational corporations, technology leaders, and industrial innovators.

In 2024, ADIO launched the Abu Dhabi Investment Forum in London and Shanghai The agency also inaugurated its first major cluster, SAVI (Smart & Autonomous Vehicle Industries), which was instrumental in securing a landmark agreement with Archer Aviation to develop, build, and operate commercial eVTOL in Abu Dhabi. As part of this initiative, ADIO established the Smart and Autonomous Systems Council (SASC), chaired by Sheikh Hamdan bin Mohamed bin Zayed Al Nahyan, aiming to position Abu Dhabi as a global hub for smart and autonomous systems.

ADIO plans to expand its global footprint by launching official international offices in key financial and technology centers, including Shanghai, London, Hong Kong, and San Francisco. These offices will focus on investment opportunities, FDI attraction, international partnerships, and business facilitation.

== Platforms ==
ADIO operates several platforms to deploy strategic investments, attract foreign and domestic investment, support business growth, and drive economic development in Abu Dhabi.

=== Innovation Investment Program ===
The Innovation Investment Program offers equity funding, financial incentives, and value creation support to scale ups and technology companies.

=== Abu Dhabi Residents Office (ADRO) ===
ADRO focuses on talent attraction and residency services, offering specialized visas and concierge services for investors, skilled professionals, and entrepreneurs. It facilitates the Golden Visa Program, which grants extended residency to high-value individuals contributing to Abu Dhabi's economic vision.

=== Abu Dhabi Investment Forum (ADIF) ===
The Abu Dhabi Investment Forum is an annual event organized by ADIO to promote foreign direct investment (FDI) and strategic partnerships in key economic sectors. The forum brings together investors, government officials, and industry leaders to discuss Abu Dhabi's economic vision, investment opportunities, and sectoral growth initiatives.

=== Clusters ===
ADIO Clusters support strategic industries such as smart and autonomous vehicles, food and water technology, financial services, gaming and media, and life sciences. ADIO Clusters provides financial incentives, infrastructure support, and regulatory facilitation to businesses aligning with Abu Dhabi's economic priorities.

=== Ghadan VC Fund ===
A venture capital investment initiative launched by ADIO as part of Abu Dhabi's Ghadan 21 economic stimulus program to support startups and high-growth technology companies.

=== Musataha ===
The Musataha Program enables long-term land agreements for investors, allowing them to develop projects on leased government land.

=== Public-Private Partnership (PPP) ===
Through Public-Private Partnerships (PPP), ADIO facilitates infrastructure and development projects by partnering with private sector entities. The PPP framework includes transport, healthcare, and education projects aimed at enhancing Abu Dhabi's infrastructure.

=== Abu Dhabi IPO Fund ===
The Abu Dhabi IPO Fund, launched with AED 5 billion, supports private companies in going public on the Abu Dhabi Securities Exchange (ADX) by providing advisory, financial, and structural assistance to ensure successful IPO and listings.

=== Investor Services ===
The Investor Services platform provides end-to-end business support, including assistance with company setup, regulatory approvals, land and utilities access, and government liaison services.

=== Retail Development Program ===
The Retail Development Program supports the development of luxury retail destinations, the attraction of leading global brands, and the delivery of exclusive retail and cultural events, including partnerships with international institutions such as Sotheby's.

The initiative provides targeted incentives and subsidies to retail developers, mall operators, and luxury brands.

=== Industrial Development Bureau (IDB) ===
The IDB focuses on the growth and regulation of Abu Dhabi's industrial sector by supporting local manufacturing and industrial innovation.

== See also ==
- ADQ
- Mubadala Investment Company
- Government of Abu Dhabi
