= Addio =

Addio (Italian Goodbye) may refer to:

== Music ==
- "Addio", song by Tosti
- "L'Addio", song by Leoncavallo
- "L'Addio", two different songs by Donizetti
- "Addio, addio", Italian entry in the Eurovision Song Contest 1962, performed in Italian by Claudio Villa
- "Addio", song by Ames Brothers Al Hoffman, Dick Manning, 1954
- "Addio", song by Claudio Villa, 1958
- "Addio", song by Ann-Louise, 1963
- "Addio", song by Demis Roussos, Leo Leandros, K. Munro, 1974
- "Addio", song by Fred Bertelmann, Richards, Baker, Ross, Blecher, 1959
- "Addio", song by Gino Paoli, 1971
- "Addio", song by Kamahl, H. Van Hemert and R. Woddis, 1975
- "Addio", song by Mina, Amurri, Morgan, 1965
- "Addio", song by Will Tura, Jean Kluger, Fred Jay, Adapt. Nelly Byl, 1977
- "Addio", song by Mireille Mathieu, 1975
