= Liwa Oasis =

Liwa Oasis وَاحَـة لِـيْـوَا
- Oasis
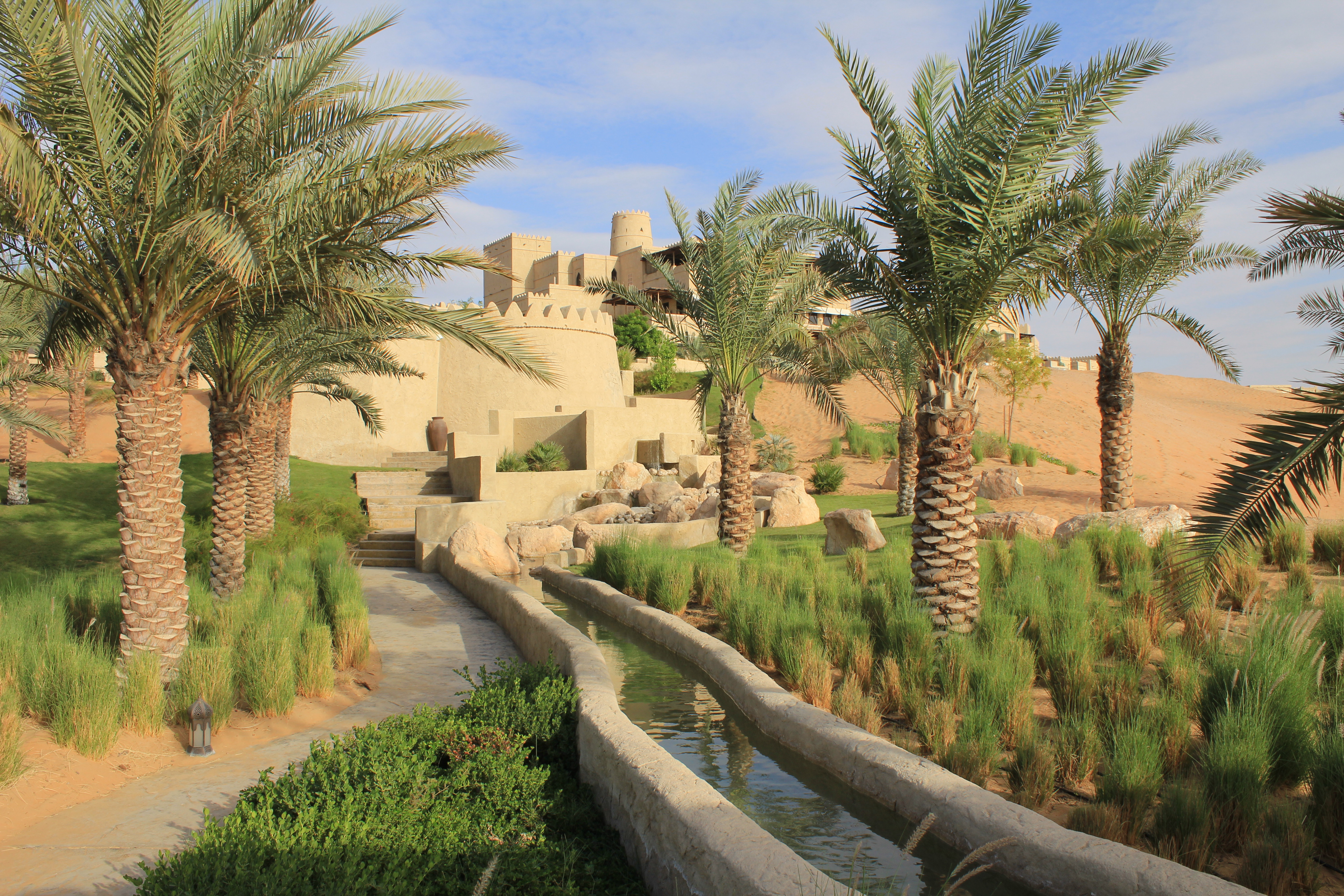
- A falaj in Qasr Al Sarab, Liwa Oasis.

- Location of Mezairaa, UAE. Considered the largest town in Liwa Oasis
- Coordinates: 23.13231°N 53.79662°E
- Country: United Arab Emirates
- Emirate: Abu Dhabi
- Municipal region: Al Dhafra

Government
  - Type: Absolute monarchy
  - Emir: Mohammed bin Zayed Al Nahyan
  - Ruler's Representative of the Western Region of the Emirate of Abu Dhabi: Hamdan bin Zayed bin Sultan Al Nahyan

Population (2019)
  - Total: 20,192
- Time zone: UTC+4 (UAE Standard Time)

The Liwa Oasis (Arabic: وَاحَـة لِـيْـوَا, romanized: Wāḥat Līwā) is a large oasis area in the Western Region of the Emirate of Abu Dhabi, the United Arab Emirates.

== Geography ==
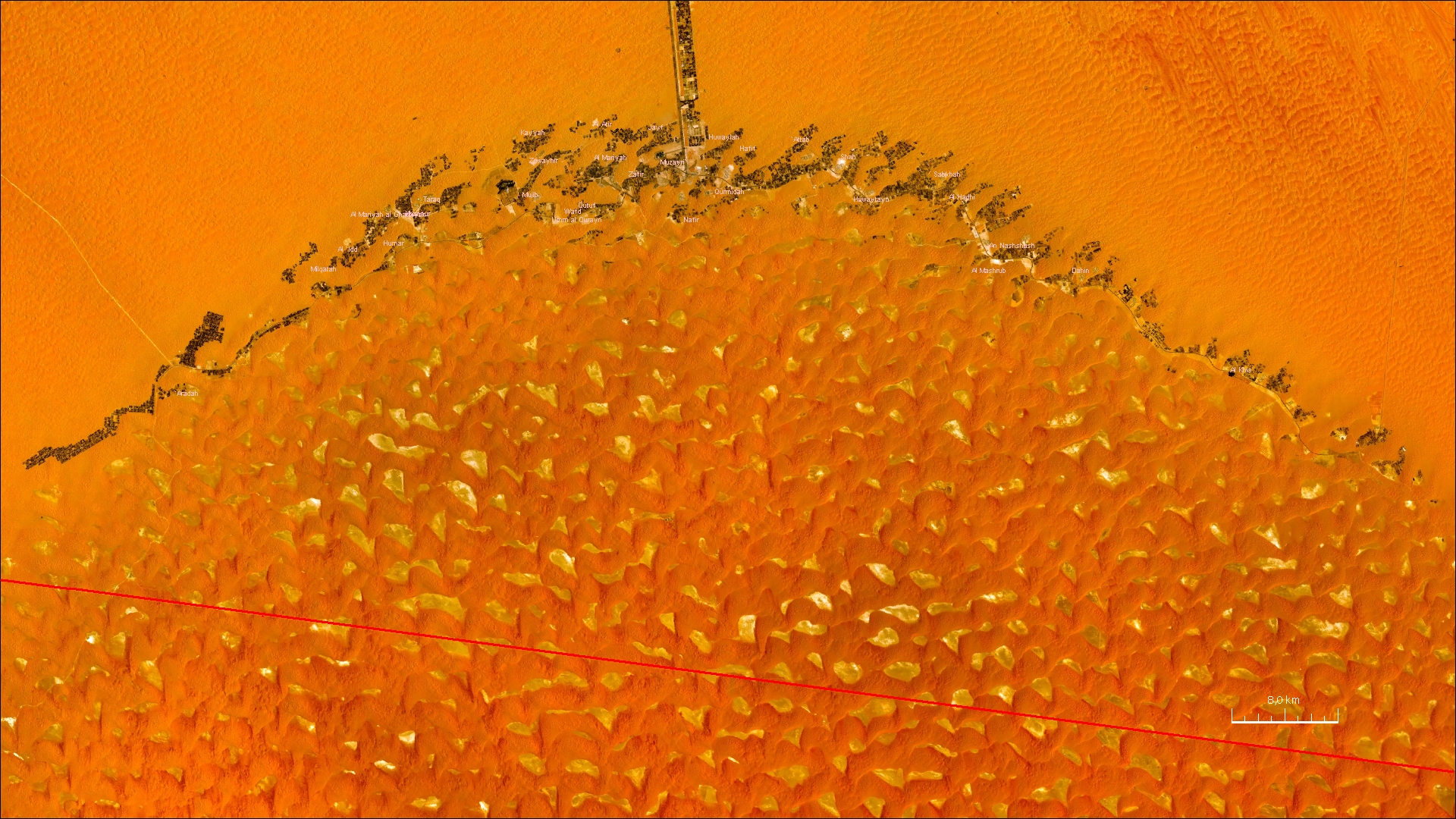
The satellite image shows the location of the belt of oases along the northern reaches of the Rub al Khali dune fields. The border with Saudi Arabia is shown as a red line. To the north, farms along the highway to Madinat Zayed are visible.

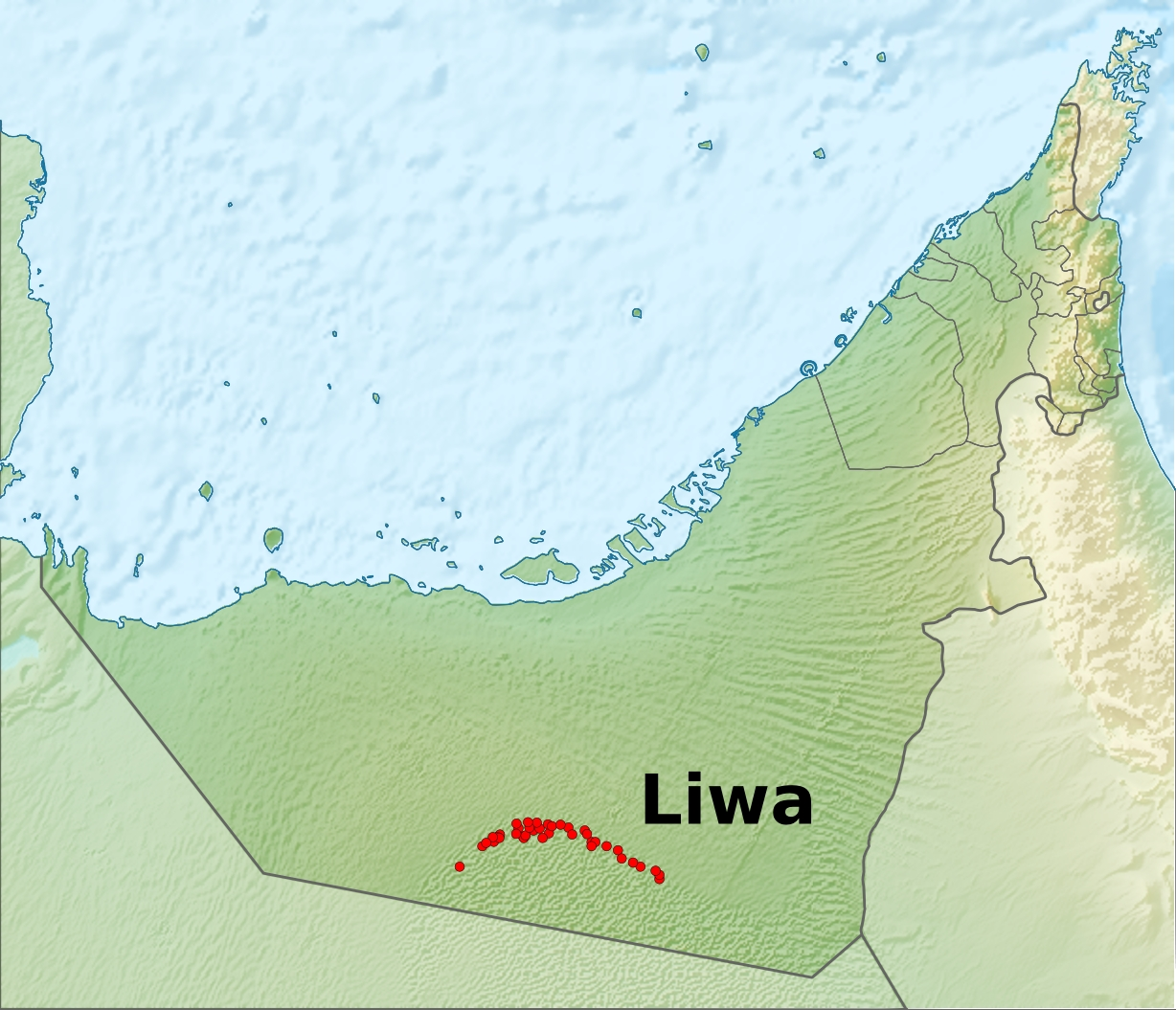
Location in the United Arab Emirates

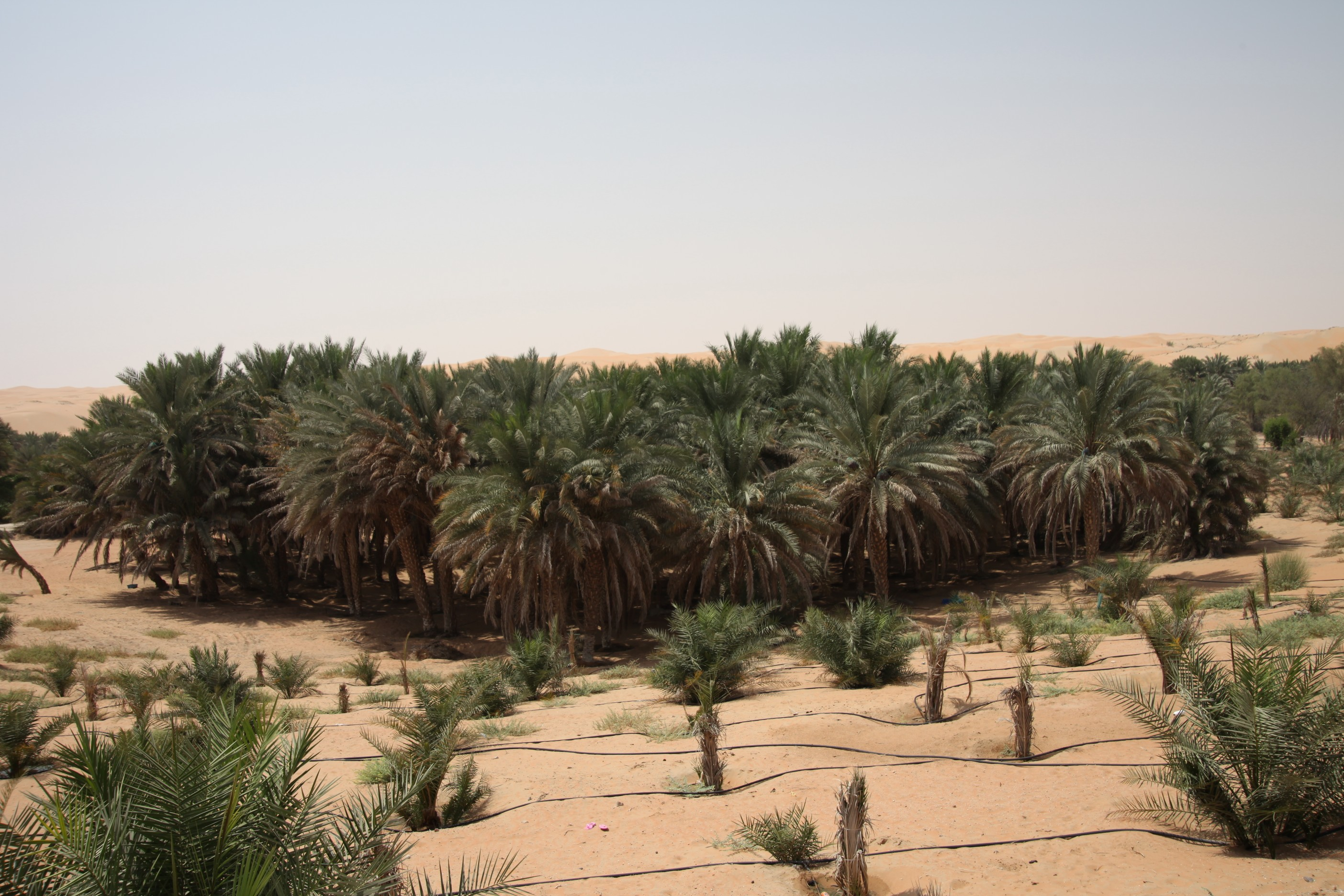
Date palm trees in Liwa Oasis

Liwa Oasis is about 97.6 km (60.6 miles) south of the Persian Gulf coast and 150 km (93 miles) southwest of the city of Abu Dhabi, on the northern edge of Rub' al Khali desert. It is centered around 23°08′N 53°46′E and stretches about 100 km (62 miles) east-west, along an arch curved to the north. It consists of some 50 villages. The geographic and economic center of the oasis is Muzayri`, where the highway from Abu Dhabi enters the oasis and then divides to the east (65 km (40 miles) to the easternmost village, Mahdar Bin `Usayyan) and west (45 km (28 miles) to the westernmost village, `Aradah). According to the census of population of 2005, the population was 20,196. Earlier estimates judging from satellite images which gauged the population at 50,000 to 150,000, were too high. The villages of Liwa Oasis are the southernmost settlements of Abu Dhabi and of the United Arab Emirates. The southern border of Abu Dhabi with Saudi Arabia, which runs at a distance between 16 and 35 km (9.9 and 21.7 miles) to the Oasis, is a straight line in the Rub al Khali desert, which is largely uninhabited. Mahdar Bin `Usayyan is the southernmost village of the Emirates, and also the easternmost of the oasis. 10 km (6.2 miles) south of the border, and 40 km (25 miles) south of the eastern part of the oasis is the Saudi oil facility Shaybah. However, there is no road linking Liwa Oasis and Shaybah, and no border crossing. A modern, multi-lane highway connects the oasis area to the capital, Abu Dhabi.

=== Villages ===
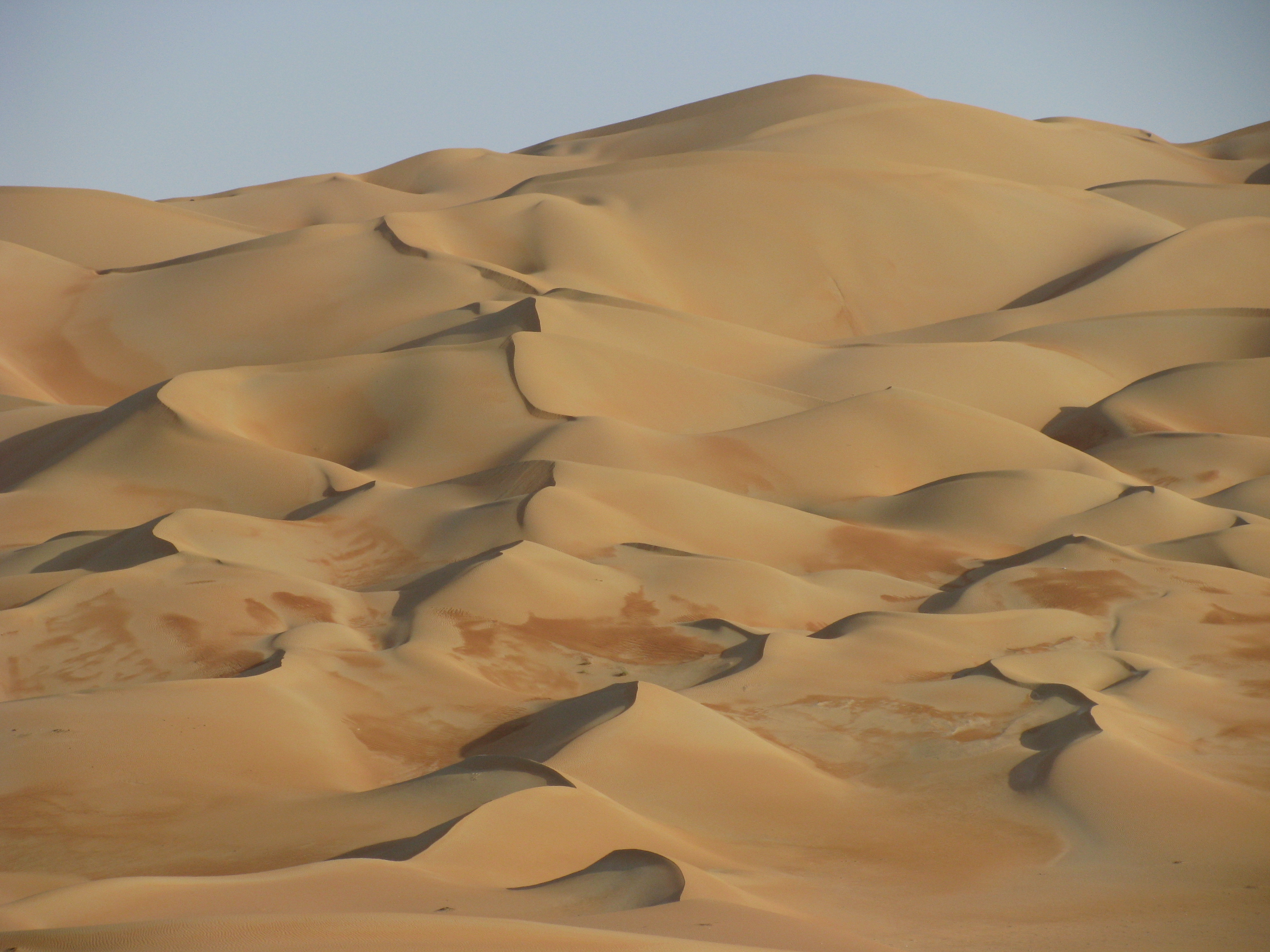
Sand dunes in Liwa Oasis.

The USGS Geographic Names Database lists 39 populated places in the area of the oasis, which are listed from west to east in the following table.

Village	Arabic	Coordinates
`Aradah	عرادة	22°59′00″N 53°26′00″E
Milqatah	ملقطة	23°04′00″N 53°32′00″E
Al-`Idd	العيد	23°04′48″N 53°33′02″E
Al-Mariyah al-Gharbiyah	المارية الغربية	23°06′12″N 53°34′48″E
Humar	حمار	23°05′04″N 53°35′03″E
Khannur	خنور	23°06′14″N 53°36′05″E
Hamarur	حمرور	23°06′00″N 53°36′31″E
Taraq	طرق	23°06′50″N 53°36′41″E
Mujib	مجيب	23°07′00″N 53°41′00″E
Kayyah	جيه	23°09′30″N 53°41′05″E
Zuwayhir	ظويهر	23°08′22″N 53°41′36″E
Wafd	وفد	23°06′20″N 53°42′50″E
Umm al Qurayn	أم القرين	23°06′00″N 53°43′00″E
Qutuf	قطوف	23°06′36″N 53°43′29″E
Al-Atir	العاطر	23°09′50″N 53°44′07″E
Al-Mariyah	المارية	23°08′30″N 53°44′30″E
Dhafeer	ظفير	23°07′50″N 53°45′37″E
Jayf	جيف	23°09′44″N 53°46′28″E
Muzayri	مظيري	23°08′19″N 53°47′14″E
Nafir	نافر	23°06′00″N 53°48′00″E
Huwaylah	حويلة	23°09′19″N 53°49′26″E
Qurmidah	قرمدة	23°07′08″N 53°49′42″E
Hafif	هفيف \ حفيف	23°08′52″N 53°50′29″E
`Attab	عتاب	23°09′14″N 53°52′46″E
Shah	شاه	23°08′33″N 53°54′51″E
Huwaytayn	حويتين	23°06′51″N 53°55′52″E
Sabkhah	صبخة	23°07′50″N 53°59′11″E
Al-Hadhi	الهذي	23°06′57″N 53°59′48″E
Tharwaniyah	ثروانية	23°05′00″N 54°01′00″E
Al Mashrub	المشرب	23°04′00″N 54°01′00″E
An-Nashshash	النشاش	23°05′00″N 54°02′00″E
Dahin	داهن	23°04′00″N 54°05′00″E
Wadhil	واظل	23°03′00″N 54°08′00″E
Mawsil	موصل	23°01′00″N 54°09′00″E
Al-Khis	الخيس	23°00′00″N 54°12′00″E
Quwaysah	قويسة	22°59′00″N 54°14′00″E
Hamim	حميم	22°58′00″N 54°18′00″E
Jurayrah	جريرة	22°57′00″N 54°19′00″E
Mahdar Bin `Usayyan	مهدر بن عصيان	22°56′00″N 54°19′00″E

== Economy ==
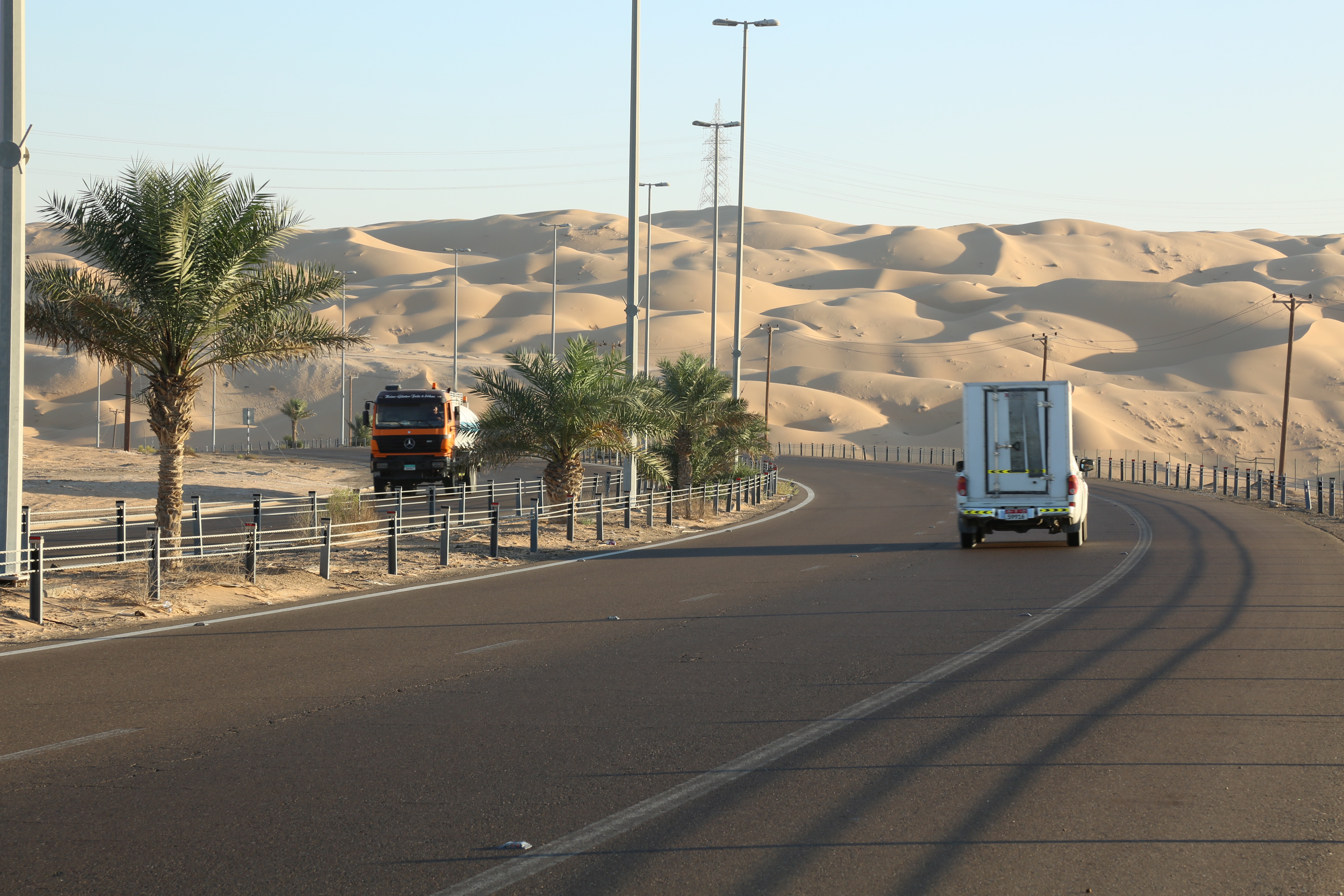
A road in Liwa

An important traditional branch of the economy is date farming. There is a widespread use of drip irrigation and greenhouses. The importance of tourism is on the rise. There are several hotels in the area including the Liwa Hotel in Muzayri`, Tilal Liwa Hotel, the Liwa Rest House in the same village and run by the government of Abu Dhabi, and the resort Qasr Al Sarab.

The nearby Moreeb dune (22°59′N 53°47′E), 22 kilometres (14 miles) south of Muzayri`, is 300 metres (980 feet) high, and is one of the largest dunes in the world. It attracts people every year during the Liwa festival, where a large number of international and local visitors come to see the off-road and Liwa Moreeb Dune Festival, camel racing events.

== History ==
The oasis is the place of birth of the ruling families of Abu Dhabi and Dubai. In 1793, the ruling family Al Nahyan moved their residence from Liwa to Abu Dhabi.

Traditionally, men from Liwa (Bani Yas tribe) were pearl divers on the coast during the summer months. Pearl diving offered an additional source of income.

The British explorer Wilfred Thesiger first arrived in Liwa around mid December 1946 in his first crossing of the Rub' Al Khali (Empty Quarter) desert. This was followed by a second visit by Thesiger in early March 1948 during his second crossing of the Rub' Al Khali (Empty Quarter) desert.

== In popular culture ==
Desert areas east of the Liwa Oasis, in the Rub' Al Khali desert, were the set of the 2015 film Star Wars: The Force Awakens, which was used to represent the desert planet Jakku.

Desert scenes in the 2020 film Sonic the Hedgehog were filmed in Liwa Oasis.

Desert scenes of the desert landscape of Liwa was filmed to represent the planet Arrakis in the 2021 film Dune and 2024 film Dune: Part Two. Scenes from the 2024 Hindi feature film Bade Miyan Chote Miyan were also filmed here.

== Tourism and accommodation ==
Tourism forms part of the local economy of Liwa Oasis, with several hotels and desert resorts serving visitors to the region. Accommodation includes Western Hotel Liwa and Bab Al Nojoum Bateen Liwa Resort.

Qasr Al Sarab Desert Resort by Anantara is a luxury desert resort situated among the dunes of the Rub' al Khali (Empty Quarter) in the Liwa Desert. Opened on 25 October 2009, the resort was developed as part of the expansion of tourism infrastructure in Abu Dhabi's western region. Designed with an architectural style resembling a traditional Arabian fortress, the property initially comprised 154 guest rooms and 52 villas.

The resort offers accommodation and recreational facilities in the surrounding desert landscape. Activities associated with the property include desert excursions and experiences reflecting the cultural heritage of the region.

== Gallery ==
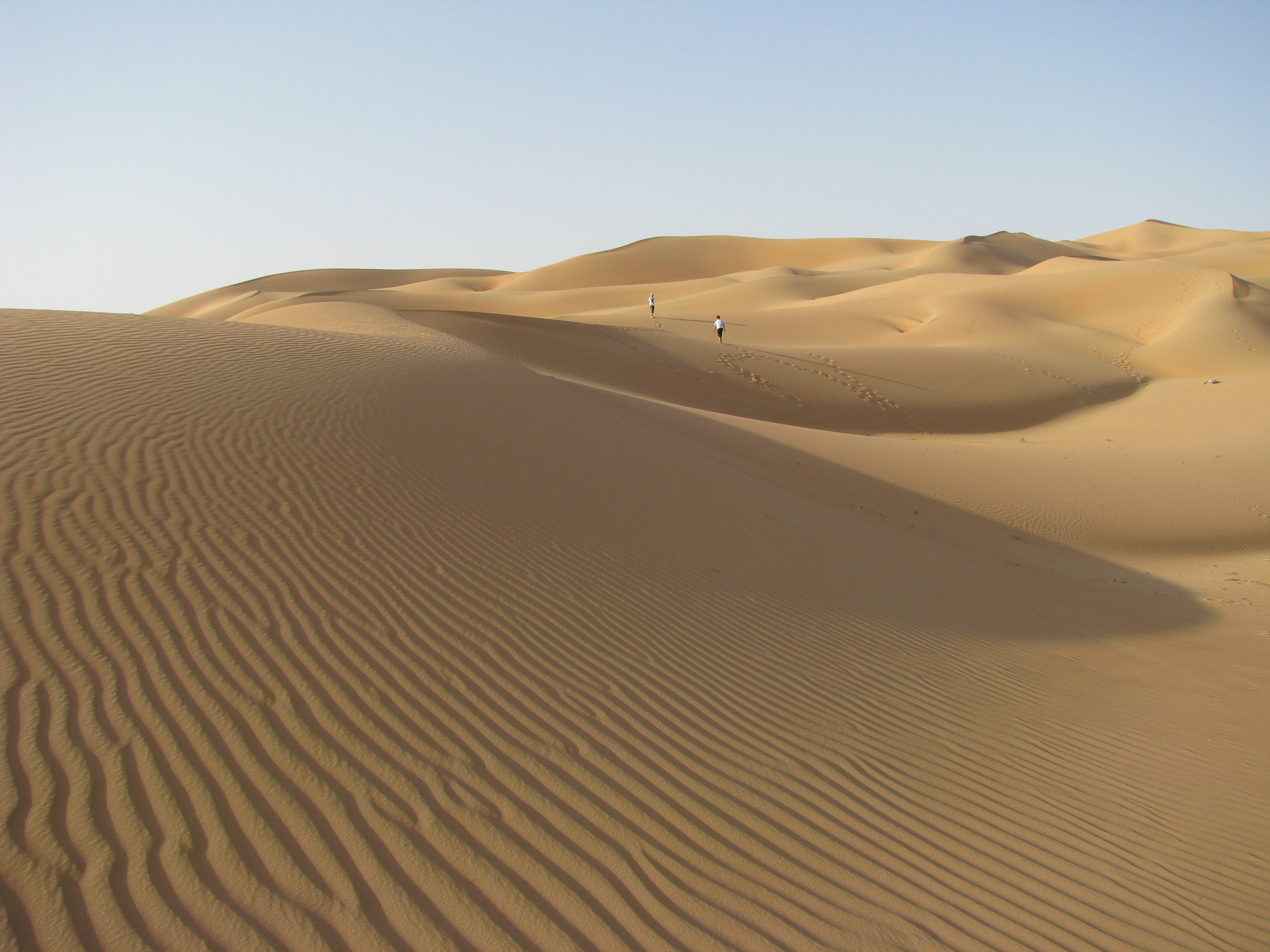
The desert in the outskirts of Liwa Oasis

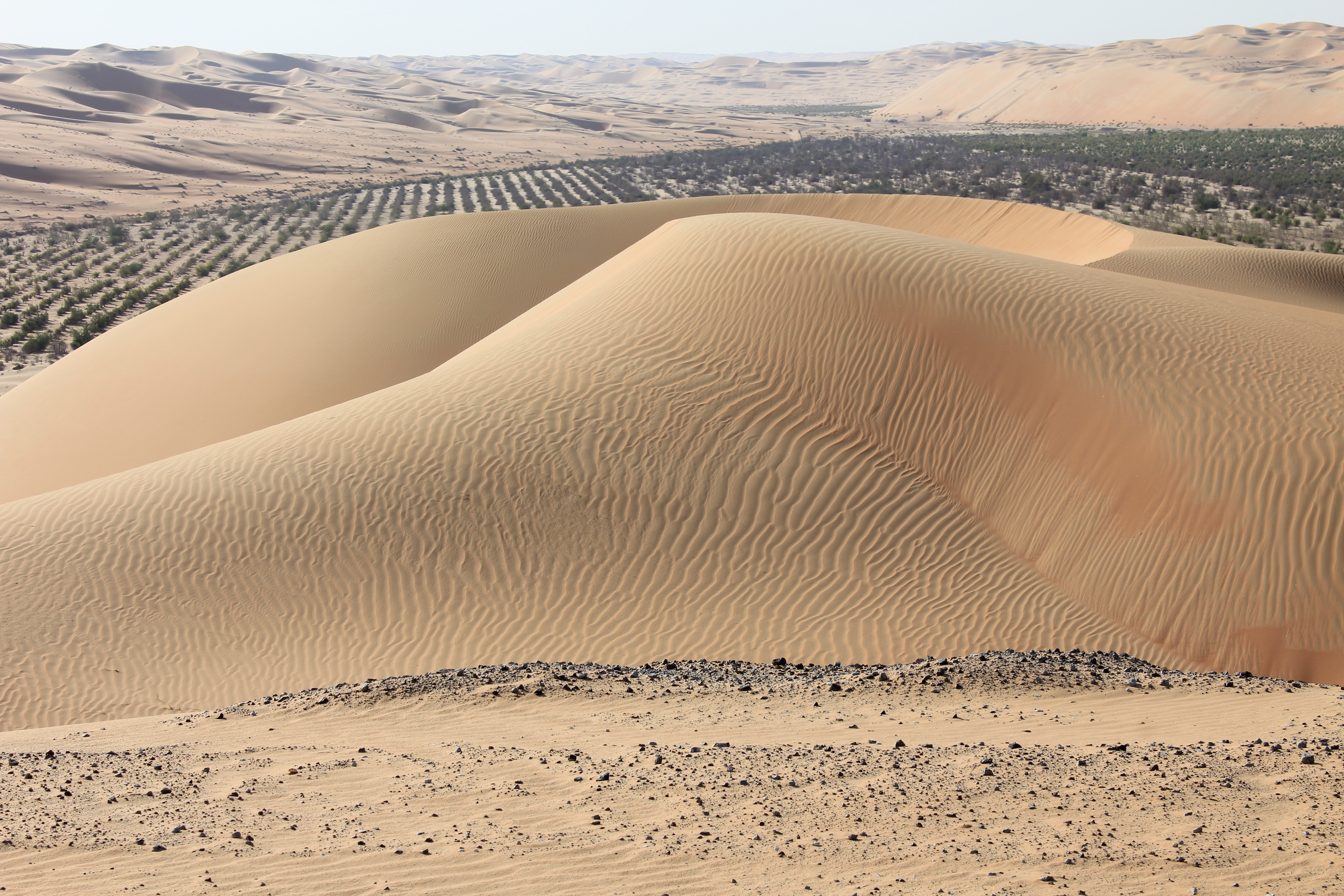
Sand dunes overlooking Liwa Oasis

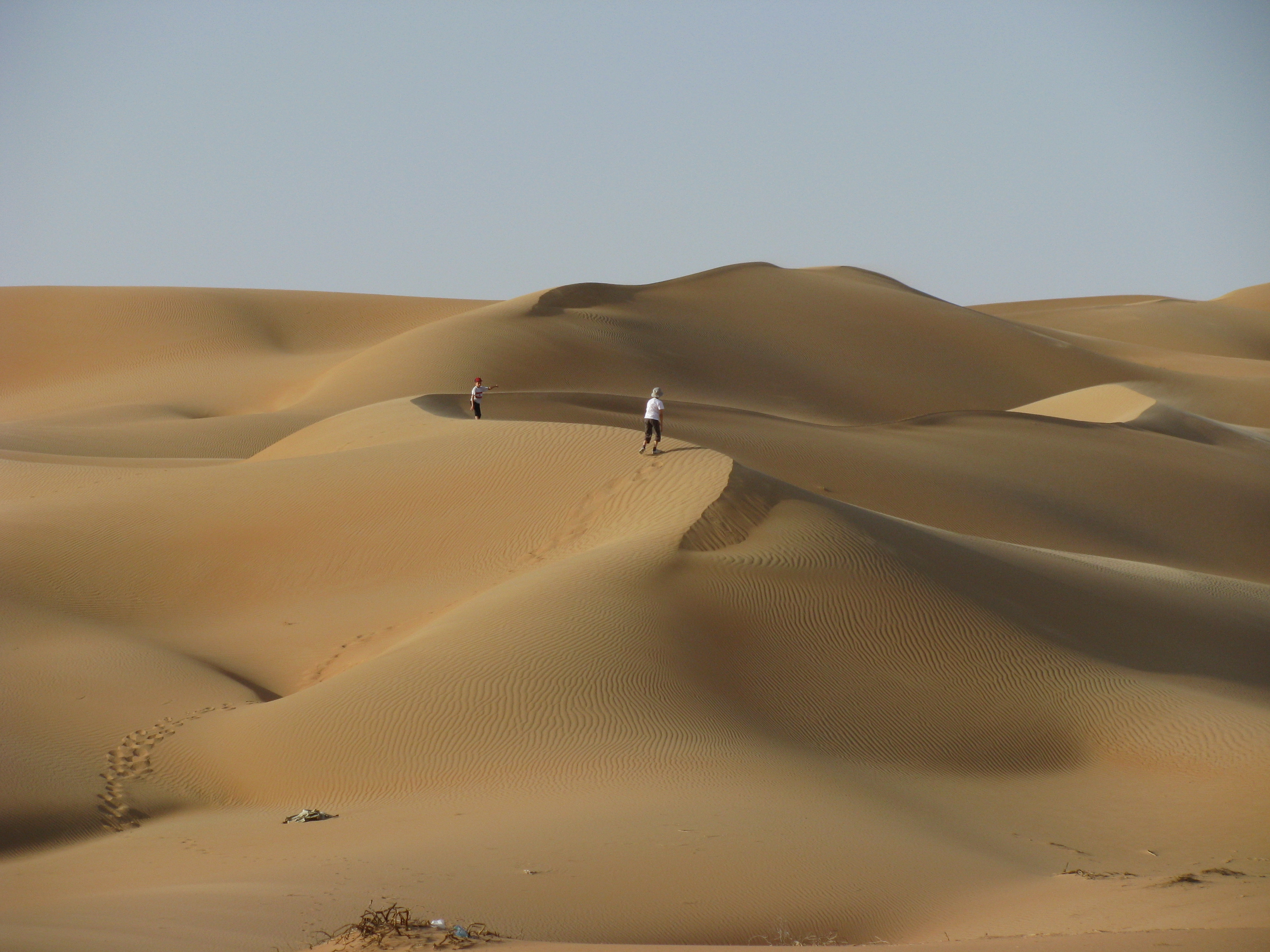
Desert around Liwa

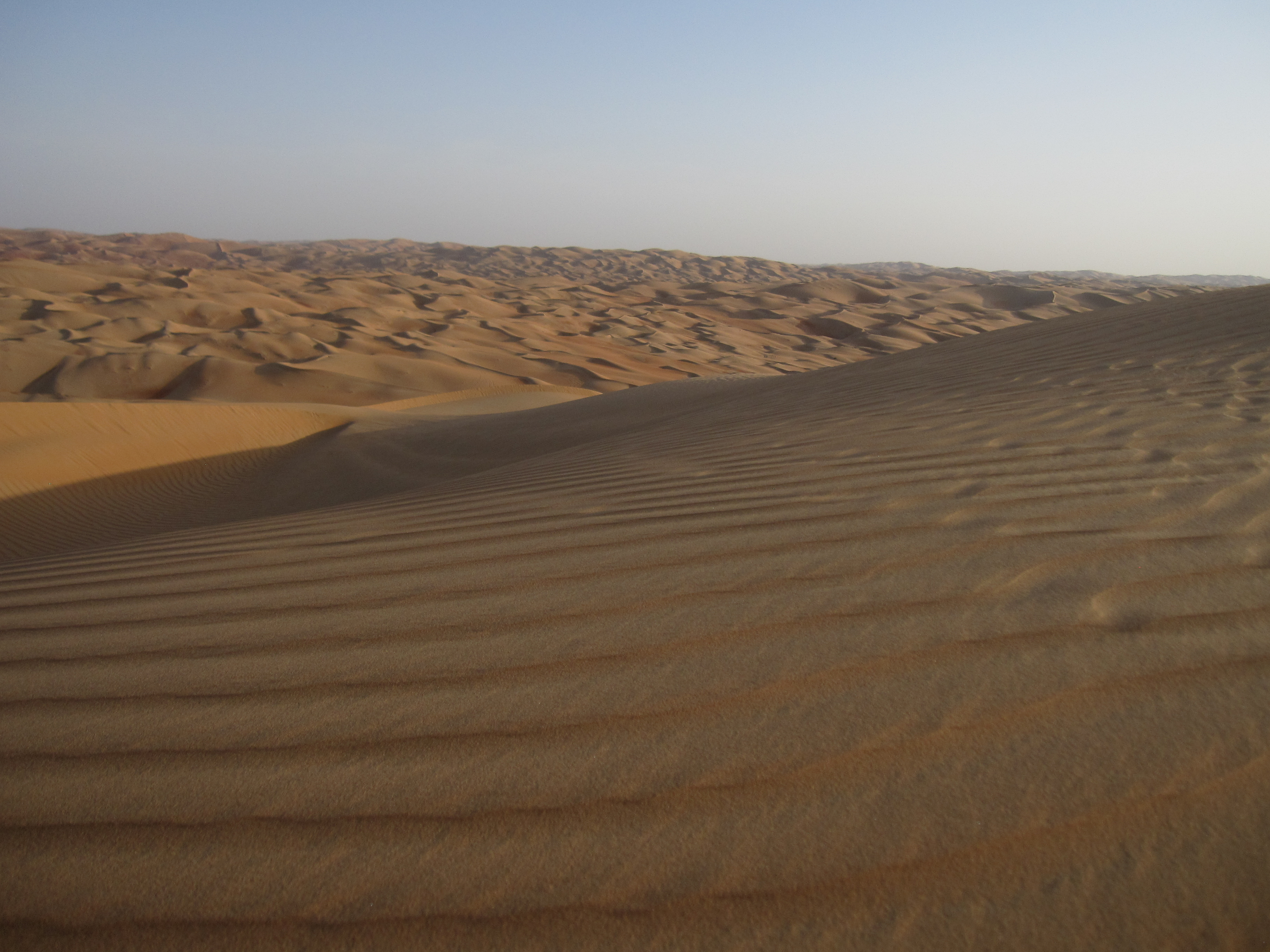
Liwa desert

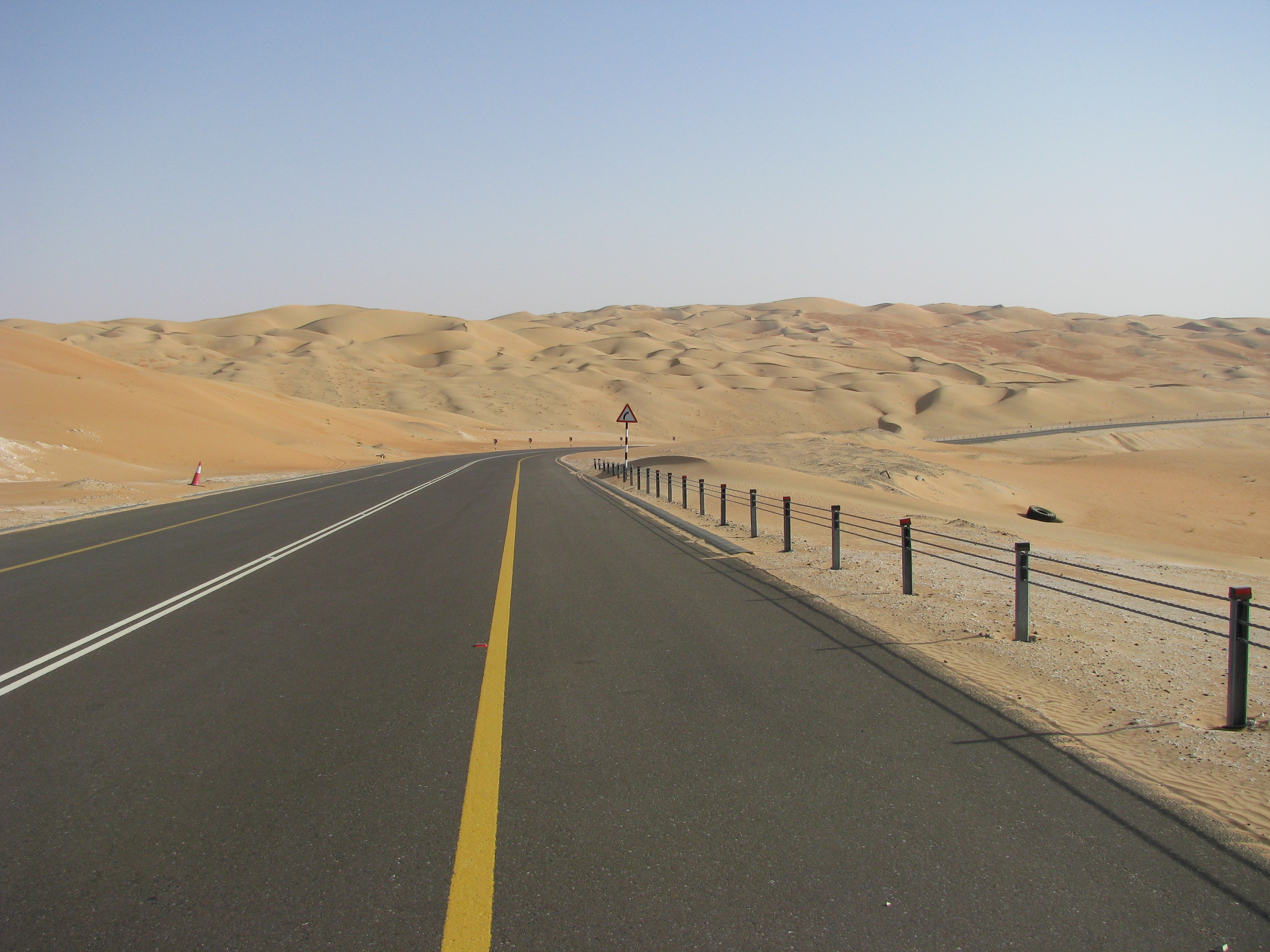
Road to Tal Moreeb

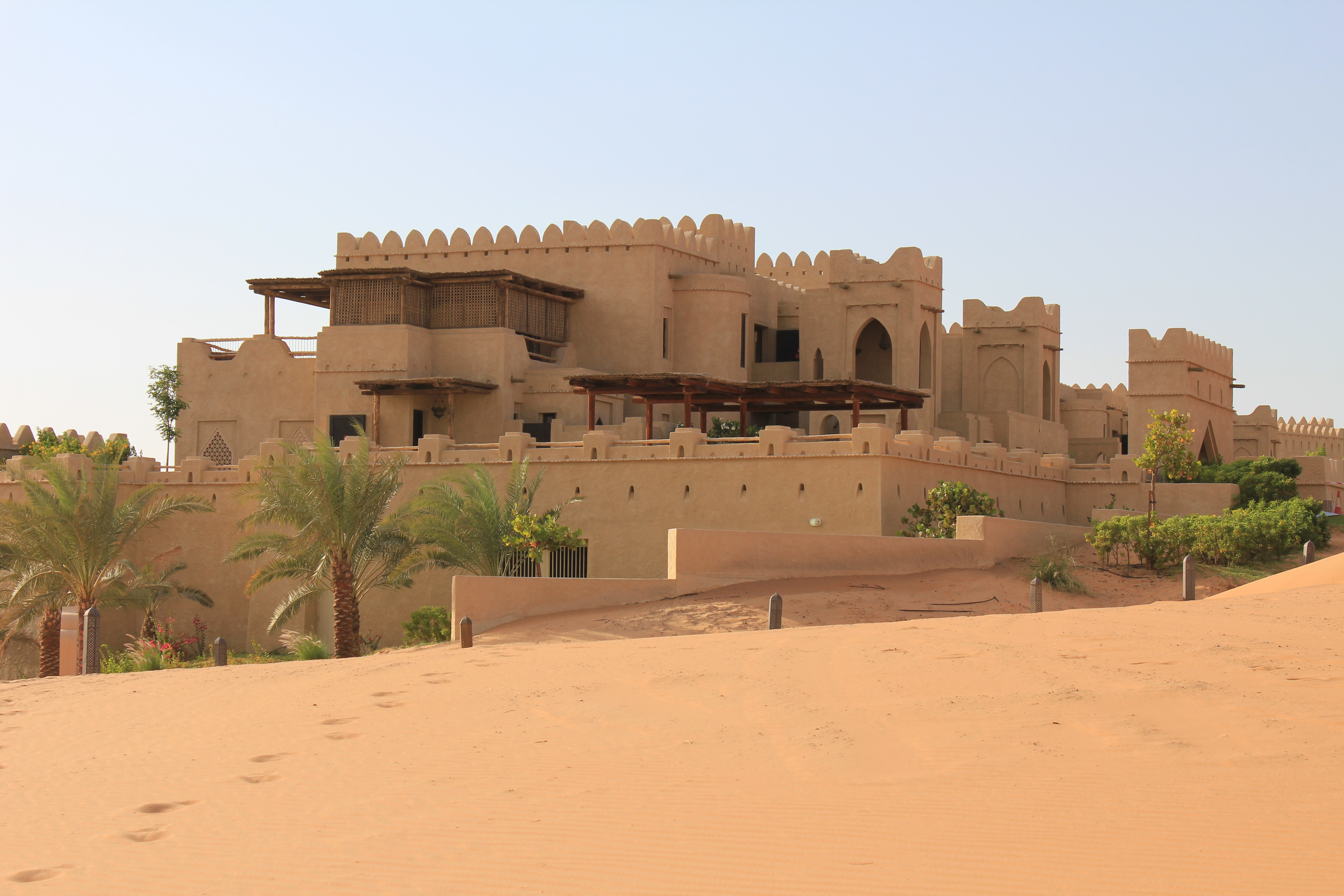
Qasr Al Sarab in Liwa

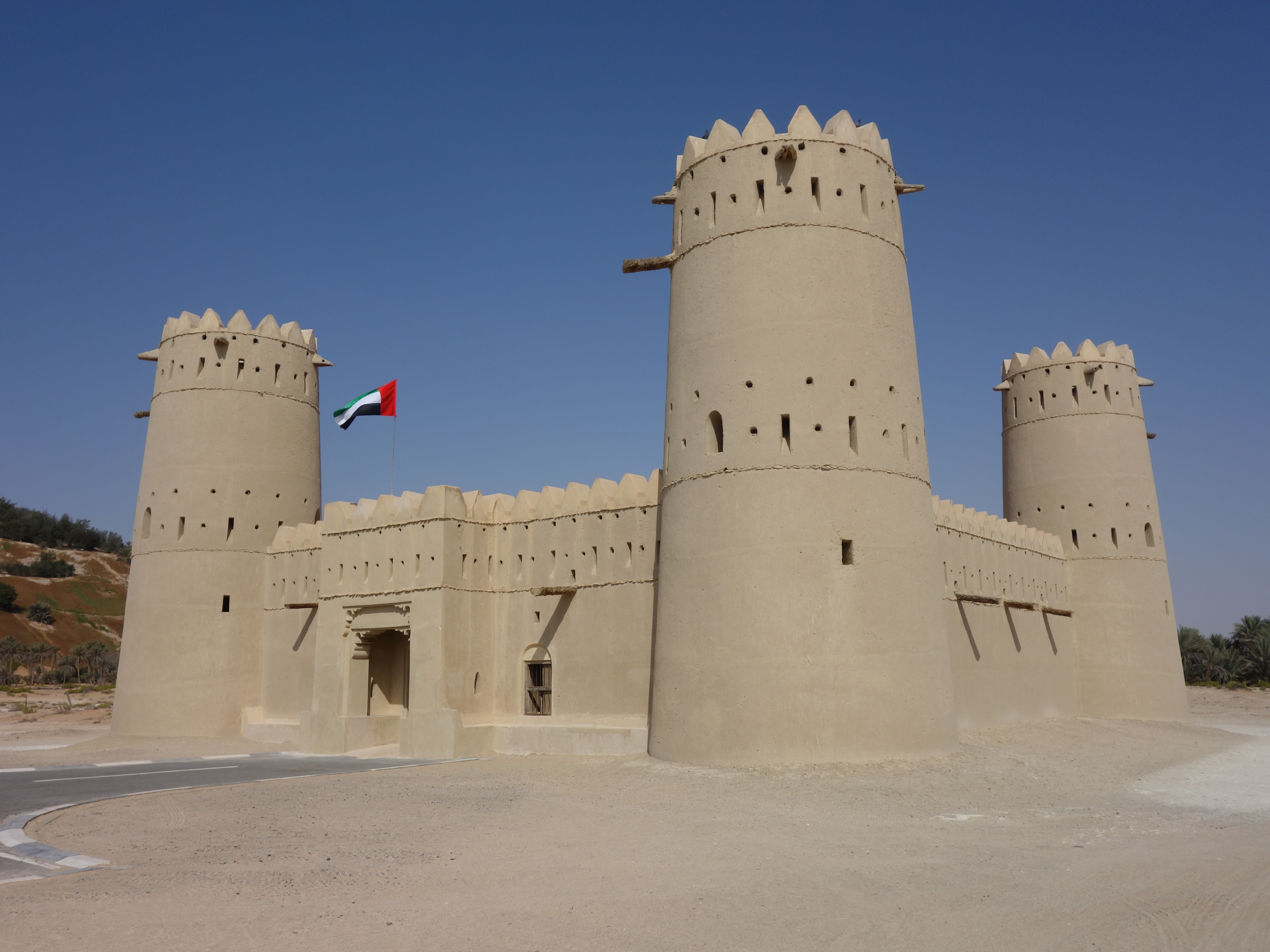
Mezairaa Fort

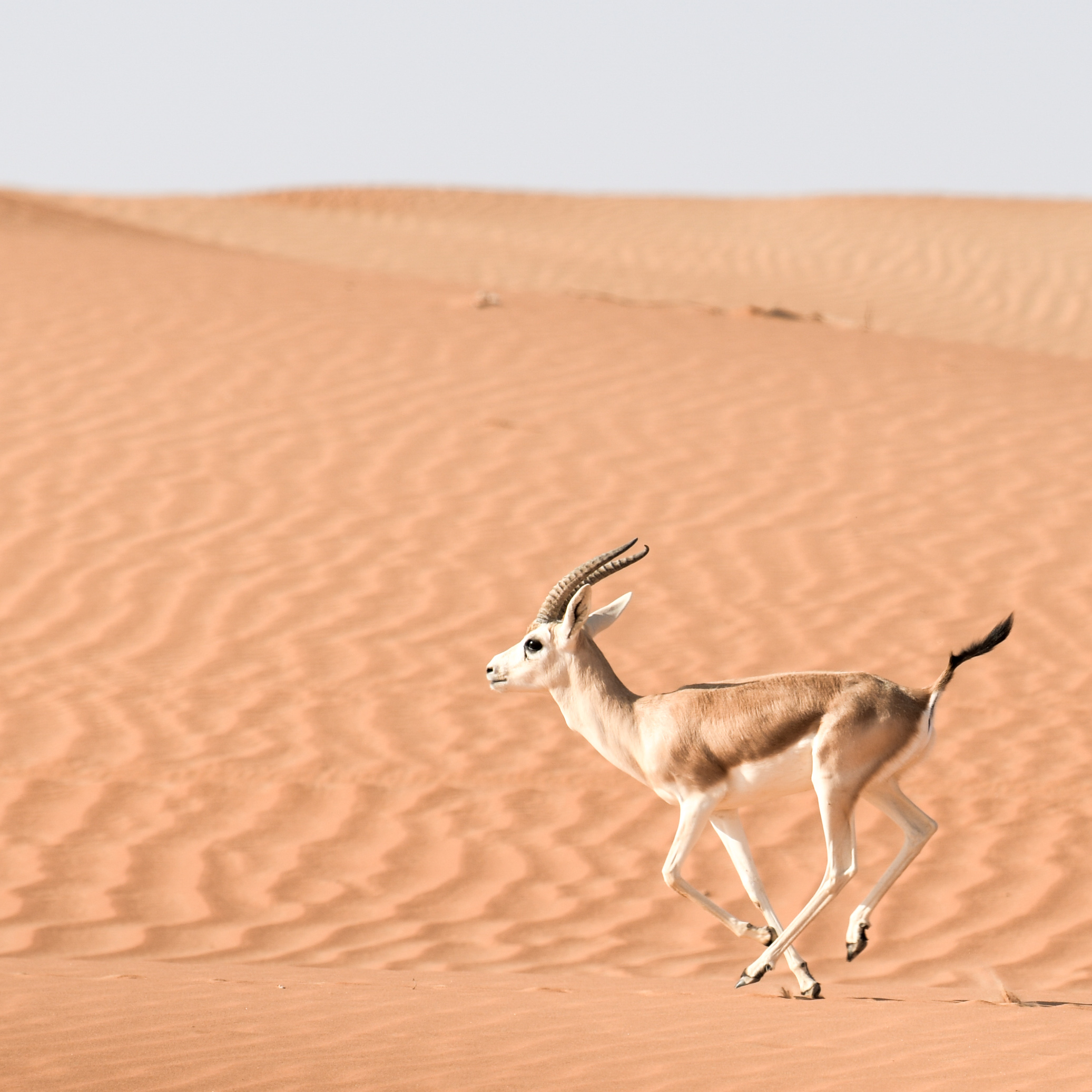
Arabian sand gazelle in Liwa

== See also ==
- Liwa Moreeb Dune Festival
- Moreeb Dune
- Al Ain Oasis
