= Emirates Foundation =

Emirati-based charity

Emirates Foundation مؤسسة الامارات
- Formation: 2005; 21 years ago
- Purpose: Public welfare
- Headquarters: Abu Dhabi, Rabdan, Al Qana
- Location: UAE
- Region served: UAE
- Official language: English / Arabic
- Chairman: H.H Sheikh Theyab bin Mohamed bin Zayed Al Nahyan
- CEO: H.E Ahmed Taleb Al Shamsi
- Key people: H.H Sheikh Theyab bin Mohamed bin Zayed Al Nahyan, Shamma Al Mazrui
- Affiliations: Oxy, Mubadala
- Website: https://www.emiratesfoundation.ae

Emirates Foundation is a charity set up by the Government of the Emirate of Abu Dhabi.

Emirates Foundation (EF) was launched in April 2005 as an initiative from General Sheikh Mohammed bin Zayed Al Nahyan, Crown Prince of Abu Dhabi and Deputy Supreme Commander of the Armed Forces. It is chaired by Sheikh Abdullah bin Zayed Al Nahyan, Minister of Foreign Affairs.

The foundation makes social investments in youth, through six key programs: Takatof, volunteering programme; Kafa'at, a youth empowerment program; Sanid, which provides emergency response volunteers; the Financial Literacy program, a program to help youth learn how to manage personal finances and Kayani, a program to develops sustainable social enterprises, providing jobs for youth with disabilities.

The Emirates Foundation also administers the Sheikh Mohammed Bin Zayed Higher Education Grant programme.

== Partners ==
Emirates Foundation is an active member of the Arab Foundations Forum (AFF), the European Philanthropy Association (EVPA) and the OECD's Network of Global Foundations, NetFWD.
