= Regulation and Supervision Bureau =

The Regulation and Supervision Bureau is the independent regulator for the Emirate of Abu Dhabi responsible for the oversight of water, wastewater and electricity.

== History ==
The Regulation and Supervision Bureau was founded in 1999 following the passing of an Emirate law reference Law No (2) of 1998. During 1997 and 1998 a privatisation committee was formed by the Abu Dhabi Government to study the UK model of un-bundling and privatisation of the then Water and Electricity Department (WED) which was a government owned vertically integrated organisation. Eventually, the WED Sector was broken into 12 companies including: production (4 off), transmission(TRANSCO), distribution and supply (2 off: ADDC and AADC) a single buyer and a number of smaller companies such as the remote services and islands grouping(RASCO, later merged into ADDC/AADC).

One of the guiding principles of the new law was the promotion of privately funded power and water production companies, generally referred to as independent water and power producers (IWPPs). As of August 2014 10 such companies have been established using project finance as the basis for a build, own and operate BOO model. The latest addition being Al Mirfa located some 120 km West of the capital Abu Dhabi.

== Income Structure ==
The Regulation and Supervision Bureau (RSB) is not funded by the Government of Abu Dhabi but by the application of licence fees to licence holders. As of August 2014, there are over 40 licence holders in the Sector.
