= Abu Dhabi =

Capital city of the United Arab Emirates

Abu Dhabi أبوظبي
- Capital city and metropolis
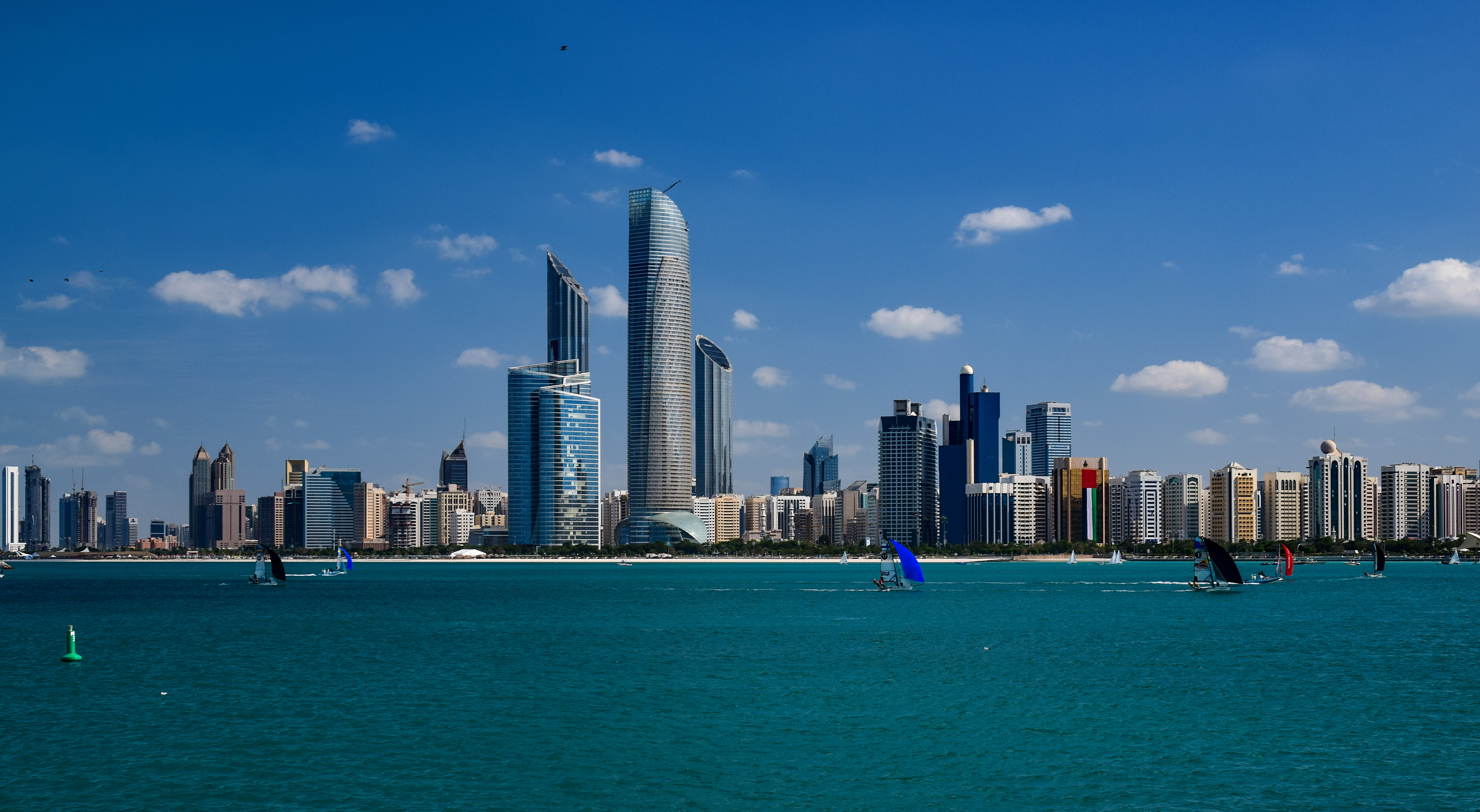
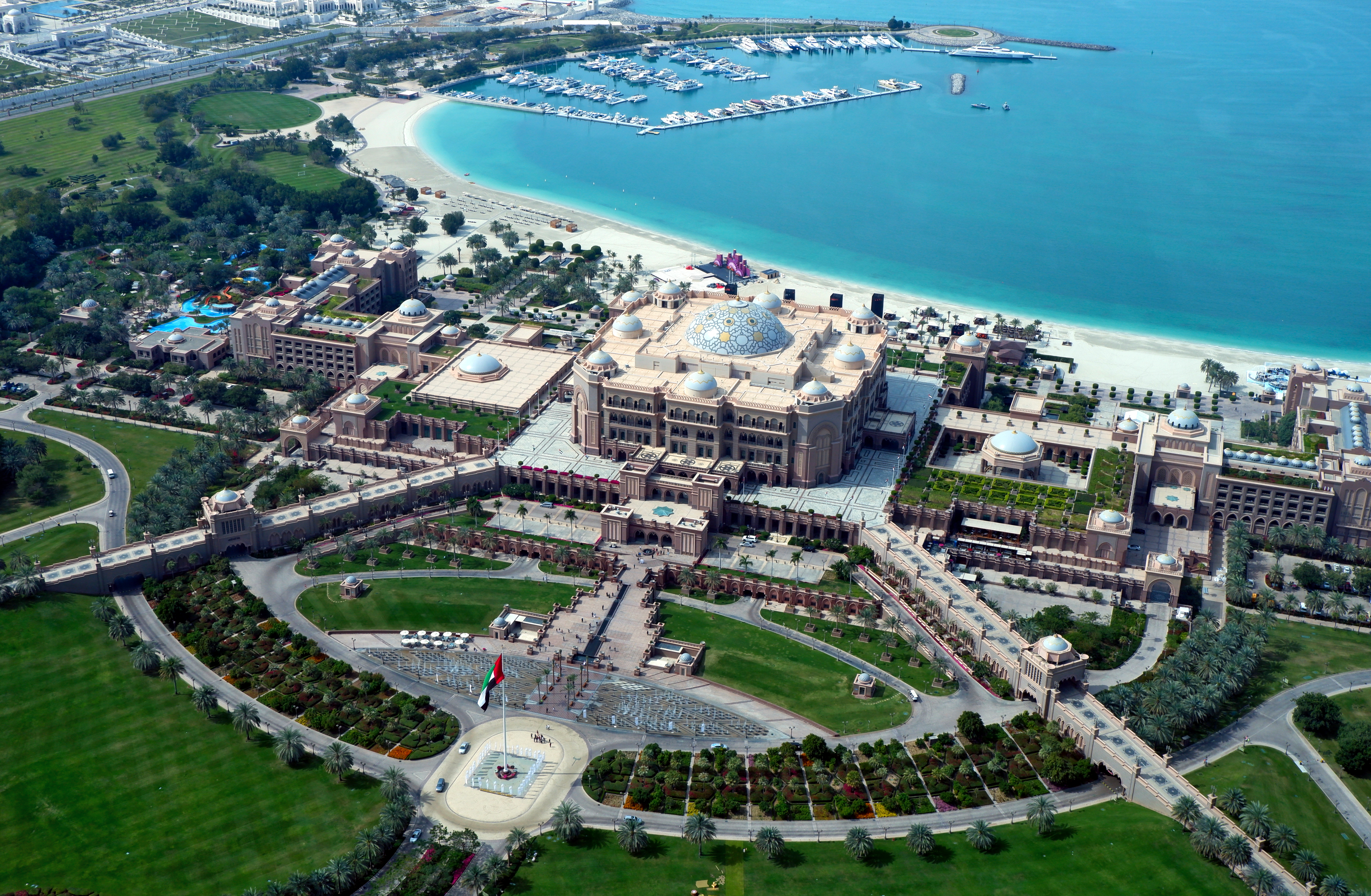
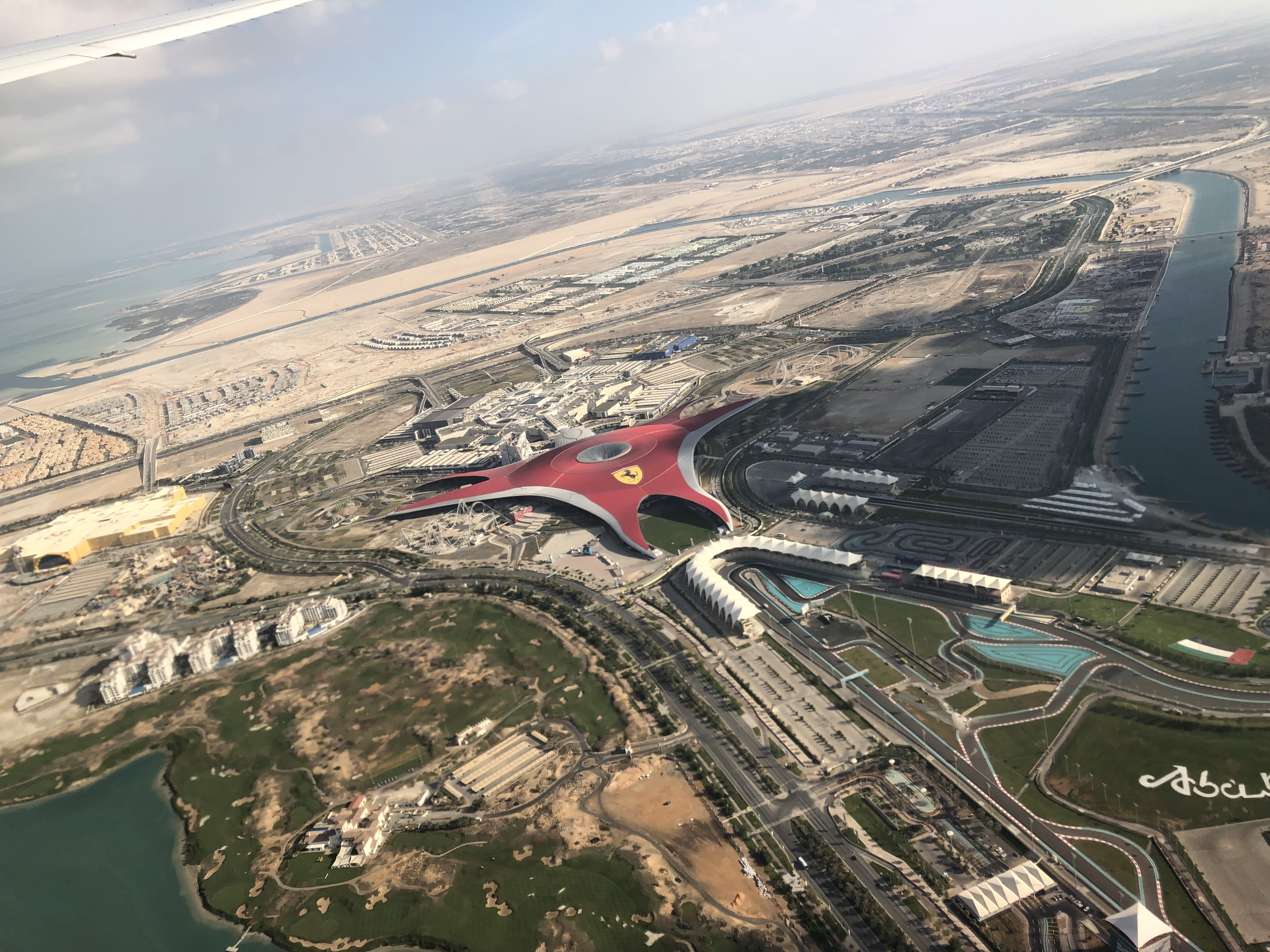
- Abu Dhabi's skyline Emirates Palace Louvre Abu Dhabi Sheikh Zayed Grand Mosque Ferrari World

- Flag Coat of arms Wordmark

- Location of Abu Dhabi within the UAE Abu Dhabi (Asia)
- Coordinates: 24°28′N 54°22′E
- Country: United Arab Emirates
- Emirate: Abu Dhabi
- Municipal region: Central Capital District

Government
  - Type: Municipality
  - Body: Abu Dhabi City Municipality
  - Director-General of City Municipality: Saif Badr al-Qubaisi

Area
  - Total: 972 km^{2} (375 sq mi)
- Elevation: 27 m (89 ft)

Population (2024)
  - Total: 2,189,860
  - Rank: 2nd
  - Density: 2,250/km^{2} (5,840/sq mi)
- Demonyms: Abu Dhabian, Dhabyani

GDP
  - Total: US$ 118.4 billion (2023)
  - Per capita: US$ 75,600 (2023)
- Time zone: UTC+4 (UAE Standard Time)
- Website: www.tamm.abudhabi

Abu Dhabi (Note: UK: /ˌæbuːˈdæbi/, US: /ˌɑːbuːˈdɑːbi/; Arabic: أَبُو ظَبِي, ʾAbū Ẓaby, pronounced [ˈɐbu ˈðˤɑbi]) is the capital city of the United Arab Emirates (UAE), and of the Emirate of Abu Dhabi, the seat of the Abu Dhabi Central Capital District and the UAE's second-most populous city, after Dubai. Situated on a T-shaped island, Abu Dhabi extends into the Persian Gulf from the central-western coast of the UAE.

Abu Dhabi is located on an island in the Persian Gulf, off the Central West Coast. Most of the city and the Emirate reside on the mainland connected to the rest of the country. In 2023, Abu Dhabi's urban area had an estimated population of 2.5 million, out of 3.8 million in the emirate of Abu Dhabi. The Abu Dhabi Investment Authority (ADIA), headquartered in the city, is estimated to manage approximately US$1 trillion in assets, making it the world's third-largest sovereign wealth fund after Norway's Government Pension Fund Global and China's CIC. Abu Dhabi has over a trillion US dollars' worth of assets under management in a combination of sovereign wealth funds headquartered there.

Abu Dhabi houses local and federal government offices and is the home of the United Arab Emirates Government and the Supreme Council for Financial and Economic Affairs. The city is home to the UAE's president, a member of the Al Nahyan family. Abu Dhabi's rapid development and urbanisation, coupled with the massive oil and gas reserves and production and relatively high average income, have transformed it into a large, developed metropolis. It is the country's centre of politics and industry, and a major culture and commerce centre. Abu Dhabi accounts for about two-thirds of the roughly $503 billion UAE economy.

== History ==
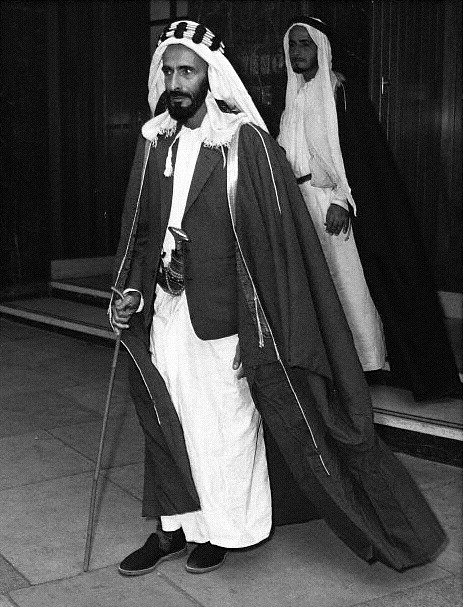
Sheikh Shakhbut bin Sultan Al Nahyan, brother of Sheikh Zayed, ruled Abu Dhabi from 1928 to 1966

The area surrounding Abu Dhabi abounds in archaeological evidence from historical civilisations, such as the Umm Al Nar Culture, which dates back to the third millennium BC. Other settlements were also found farther outside the modern city of Abu Dhabi, including the eastern and western regions of the Emirate. On 2 December 1971, Abu Dhabi, along with five other emirates, formed the United Arab Emirates (UAE). This union was marked by the establishment of a federal government and the appointment of Sheikh Zayed bin Sultan Al Nahyan as the first President of the UAE.

=== Etymology ===
In Arabic, ابو, transliterated as abu, means "father (of)", and ظبي, transliterated as dhabi, means gazelle. Abu Dhabi means "Father of the gazelle."

=== Origins of Al Nahyan ===
The Bani Yas, the tribe from which the Al Nahyan family are drawn, was originally settled in the Liwa Oasis in the Emirate's western region. This tribe was the most significant in the area, having over 20 subsections. In 1761, the discovery of fresh water by a hunting party led by Sheikh Dhiyab bin Isa Al Nahyan near the coast saw a settlement established there. A popular story is that the hunters were pursuing a gazelle, hence the name of the settlement. The Al Bu Falah subsection of the tribe were the first to establish the new settlement and remained the source of the tribal rulers. Originally consisting of a fort and twenty houses, within two years the town consisted of a settlement of some 400 houses. The fort remains at the centre of Abu Dhabi today, the Qasr Al Hosn.

=== Pearl trade ===
The pearl diving business was a key industry prior to the discovery of oil reserves. According to a source about pearling, the Persian Gulf was the best location for pearls. The pearl industry boomed from the late 19th century through to the second decade of the 20th century, however it is believed to date back around 7,000 years. Pearl divers dive for one to three minutes and would have dived as many as thirty times per day. Air tanks and any other sort of mechanical device were forbidden. The divers had a leather nose clip and leather coverings on their fingers and big toes to protect them while they searched for oysters. The divers were not paid for a day's work but received a portion of the season's earnings.

=== Trucial coast ===
In the 19th century, as a result of treaties (known as "Truces" which gave the coast its name) entered into between Great Britain and the sheikhs of the Arab States of the Persian Gulf, Britain became the predominant influence in the area. The main purpose of British interest was to protect the trade route to India from pirates, hence, the earlier name for the area, the "Pirate Coast". After the suppression of piracy, other considerations came into play, such as a strategic need of the British to exclude other powers from the region. Following their withdrawal from India in the year 1947, the British maintained their influence in Abu Dhabi as interest in the oil potential of the Persian Gulf grew.

=== First oil discoveries ===
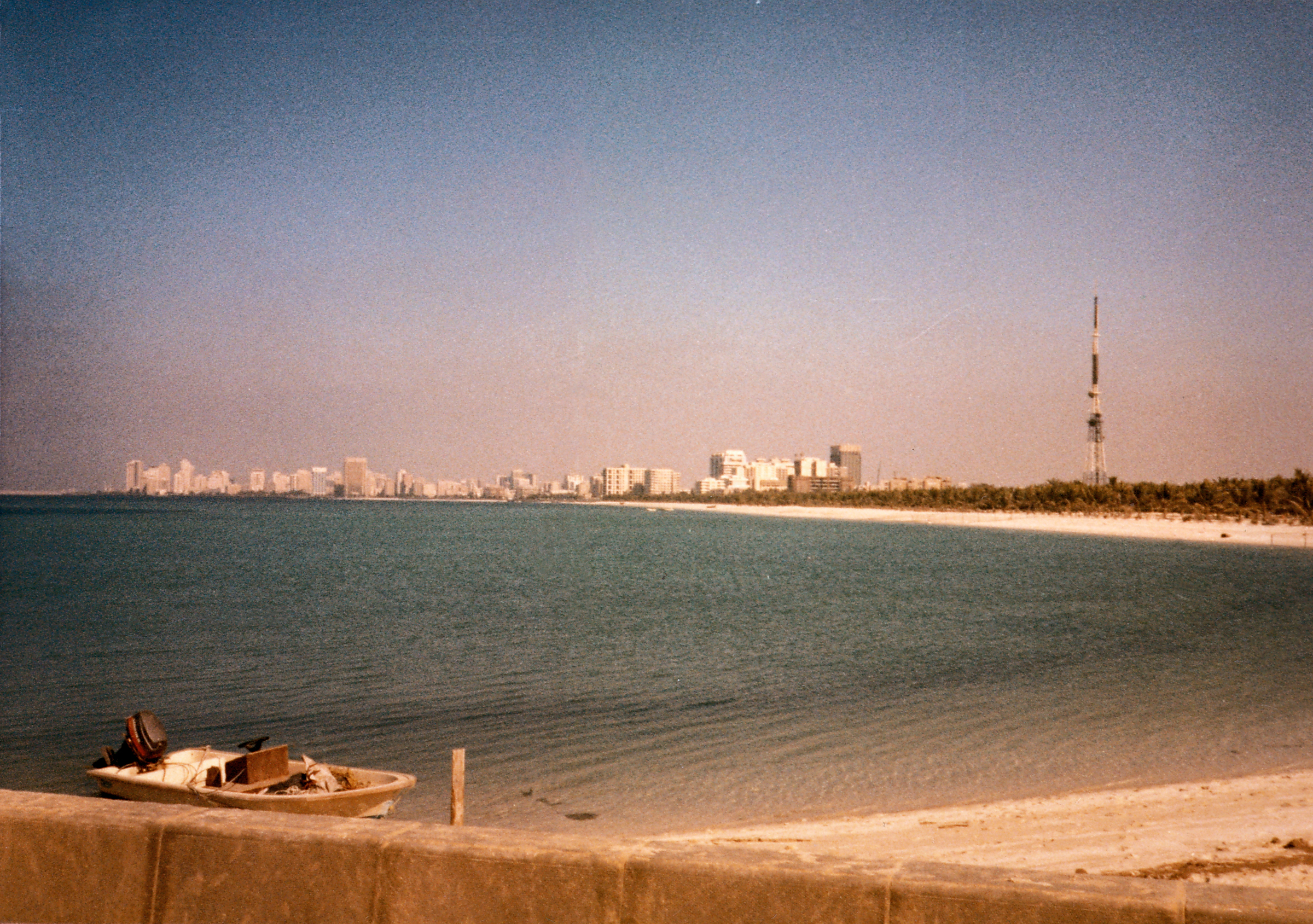
The Abu Dhabi skyline, 1987

In the mid to late 1930s, as the pearl trade declined, interest grew in the oil possibilities of the region. On 5 January 1936, Petroleum Development Trucial Coast Ltd (PDTC), an associate company of the Iraq Petroleum Company, entered into a concession agreement with the ruler, Sheikh Shakhbut bin Sultan Al Nahyan, to explore for oil. This was followed by a seventy-five-year concession signed in January 1939. Owing to the desert terrain, inland exploration was fraught with difficulties.

In 1953, D'Arcy Exploration Company, the exploration arm of BP, obtained an offshore concession which was then transferred to a company created to operate the concession: Abu Dhabi Marine Areas (ADMA) was a joint venture between BP and Compagnie Française des Pétroles (later Total). In 1958, using a marine drilling platform, the ADMA Enterprise, oil was discovered in the Umm Shaif field at a depth of about 2,669 metres (8,755 ft). This was followed in 1959 by PDTC's onshore discovery well at Murban No.3.

ADMA discovered the Bu Hasa oil field in 1962 and the Lower Zakum oil field in 1963. Today, in addition to the oil fields mentioned, the main producing fields onshore are Asab, Sahil and Shah, and offshore are al-Bunduq, and Abu al-Bukhoosh.

Perceived mismanagement of the emirate's oil revenues, as well as fears of a pan-Arab uprising, led to the British backing a bloodless coup by Shakhbut's younger brother Zayed Al Nahyan on 6 August 1966.

== Geography ==
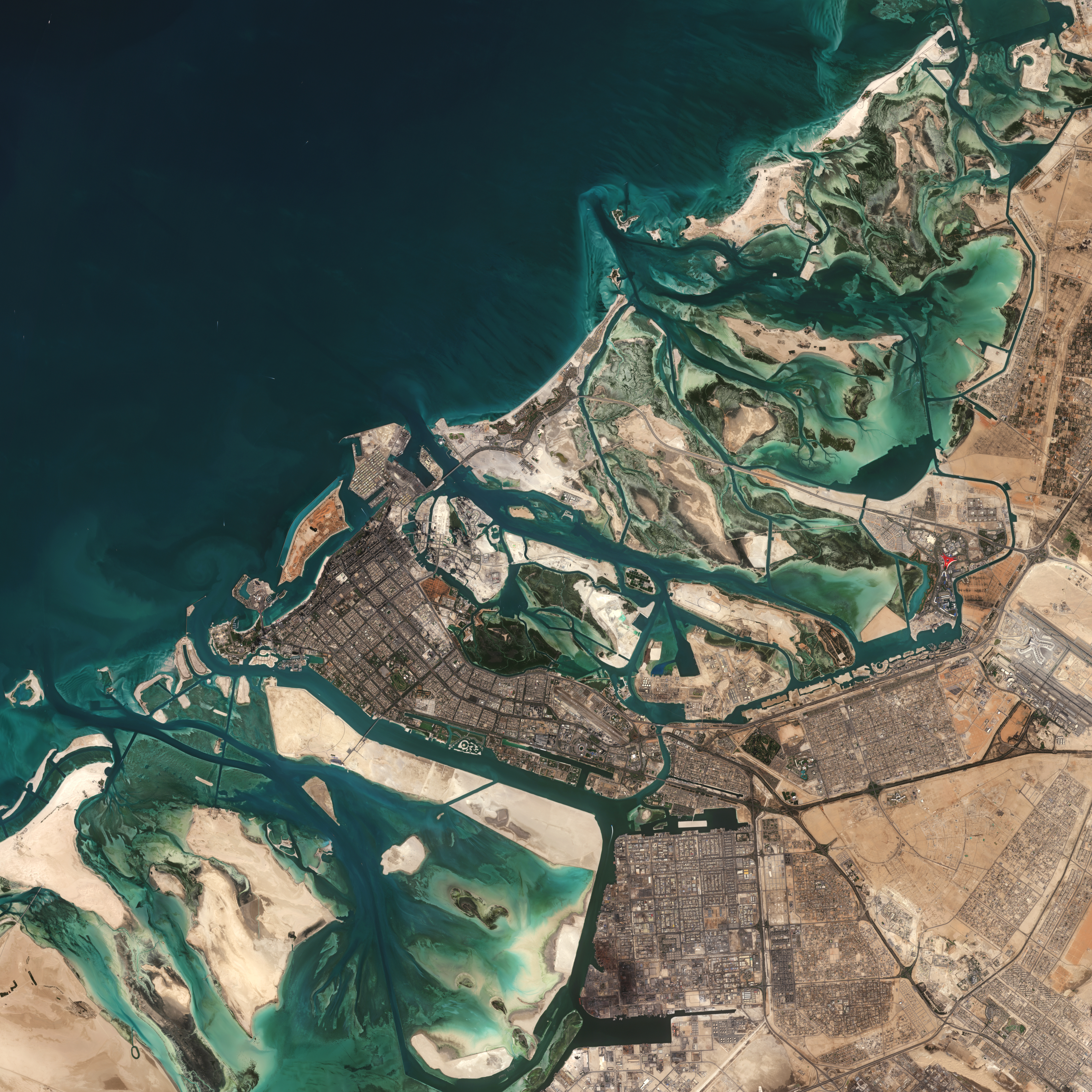
Abu Dhabi seen from Sentinel-2, European Space Agency

The city of Abu Dhabi is on the southeastern side of the Arabian Peninsula, adjoining the Persian Gulf. It is on an island less than 250 metres (820 ft) from the mainland and is joined to the mainland by the Maqta and Mussafah Bridges. A third, Sheikh Zayed Bridge, designed by Zaha Hadid, opened in late 2010. Abu Dhabi Island is also connected to Saadiyat Island by a five-lane motorway bridge. Al-Mafraq bridge connects the city to Reem Island and was completed in early 2011. This is a multi-layer interchange bridge and it has 27 lanes which allow roughly 25,000 automobiles to move per hour. There are three major bridges in the project, the largest has eight lanes, four leaving Abu Dhabi city and four coming in.

Most of Abu Dhabi city is located on the island itself, but it has many suburban districts on the mainland, for example, Khalifa City A, B, and C; Khalifa City Al Raha Beach; Al Bahia City A, B, and C; Al Shahama; Al Rahba; Between Two Bridges; Baniyas; Shamkha; Al Wathba and Mussafah Residential.

Gulf waters of Abu Dhabi holds the world's largest population of Indo-Pacific humpbacked dolphins. To the east of the island is the Mangrove National Park, located on Al Qurm Corniche. Al-Qurm (ٱلْقُرْم) is Arabic for "The Mangrove".

=== Climate ===
Abu Dhabi has a hot desert climate (Köppen climate classification BWh). Sunny blue skies can be expected throughout the year. The months of May to September are generally extremely hot and humid. The peak summer months are July and August, with maximum temperatures averaging above 40 °C (104 °F). During this time, sandstorms occur intermittently, in some cases reducing visibility to a few metres. Due to high humidity, especially in coastal areas, the heat index, or "feels-like" temperature, can be significantly higher than the actual air temperature. Dust storms are common during the hot, dry months, affecting air quality and visibility.

The cooler season is from November to March, which ranges between moderately hot to mild. This period also sees dense fog on some days and a few days of rain. On average, January is the coolest month of the year. August is the hottest. Since the Tropic of Cancer passes through the emirate, the southern part falls within the Tropics. Despite the coolest month having an 18.8 °C (65.8 °F) average, its climate is far too dry to be classed as tropical.

Climate data for Abu Dhabi (Zayed International Airport), 1991–2020 normals
Month	Jan	Feb	Mar	Apr	May	Jun	Jul	Aug	Sep	Oct	Nov	Dec	Year
Record high °C (°F)	34.3 (93.7)	38.1 (100.6)	43.0 (109.4)	44.7 (112.5)	46.5 (115.7)	48.5 (119.3)	49.3 (120.7)	48.2 (118.8)	47.7 (117.9)	43.1 (109.6)	37.9 (100.2)	33.8 (92.8)	49.3 (120.7)
Mean maximum °C (°F)	28.5 (83.3)	31.9 (89.4)	36.8 (98.2)	41.5 (106.7)	44.9 (112.8)	46.8 (116.2)	47.6 (117.7)	47.7 (117.9)	46.2 (115.2)	41.6 (106.9)	35.1 (95.2)	30.2 (86.4)	48.1 (118.6)
Mean daily maximum °C (°F)	24.5 (76.1)	26.5 (79.7)	29.7 (85.5)	35.0 (95.0)	39.6 (103.3)	41.4 (106.5)	42.5 (108.5)	43.4 (110.1)	40.9 (105.6)	36.6 (97.9)	31.0 (87.8)	26.5 (79.7)	34.8 (94.6)
Daily mean °C (°F)	19.1 (66.4)	20.6 (69.1)	23.4 (74.1)	27.7 (81.9)	31.8 (89.2)	33.7 (92.7)	35.5 (95.9)	35.9 (96.6)	33.3 (91.9)	29.7 (85.5)	25.2 (77.4)	21.1 (70.0)	28.1 (82.6)
Mean daily minimum °C (°F)	13.8 (56.8)	15.9 (60.6)	17.5 (63.5)	21.1 (70.0)	24.6 (76.3)	26.9 (80.4)	29.7 (85.5)	30.2 (86.4)	27.4 (81.3)	23.7 (74.7)	19.6 (67.3)	15.7 (60.3)	22.2 (71.9)
Mean minimum °C (°F)	11.2 (52.2)	12.3 (54.1)	14.6 (58.3)	18.0 (64.4)	21.8 (71.2)	24.3 (75.7)	26.5 (79.7)	26.8 (80.2)	24.2 (75.6)	20.8 (69.4)	16.5 (61.7)	12.9 (55.2)	9.8 (49.6)
Record low °C (°F)	5.6 (42.1)	5.4 (41.7)	8.4 (47.1)	11.3 (52.3)	16.6 (61.9)	19.8 (67.6)	22.2 (72.0)	24.9 (76.8)	20.4 (68.7)	15.0 (59.0)	13.1 (55.6)	7.3 (45.1)	5.4 (41.7)
Average precipitation mm (inches)	12.5 (0.49)	8.1 (0.32)	12.9 (0.51)	5.2 (0.20)	0.3 (0.01)	0.0 (0.0)	0.7 (0.03)	0.1 (0.00)	0.0 (0.0)	0.2 (0.01)	2.4 (0.09)	7.8 (0.31)	50.2 (1.97)
Average precipitation days (≥ 1 mm)	2.8	2.0	2.9	1.4	1.0	0.0	1.0	1.0	0.0	1.0	2.2	2.4	17.7
Average relative humidity (%)	68	66	61	53	50	54	55	54	60	62	65	69	59.7
Mean monthly sunshine hours	249.4	245.7	267.8	294.6	342.9	341.3	328.3	323.8	305.7	303.0	265.3	254.3	3,522
Percentage possible sunshine	74	77	72	77	83	83	79	81	83	85	81	76	80
Source 1: NOAA (humidity 1981-2010)
Source 2: Climate Yearly Report

=== Twin cities ===
For its geography, Abu Dhabi has been twinned with:

- Bethlehem, Palestine
- Madrid, Spain (2007)
- Houston, United States (2002)
- Brisbane, Australia (2009)
- Minsk, Belarus (2007)

== Government ==
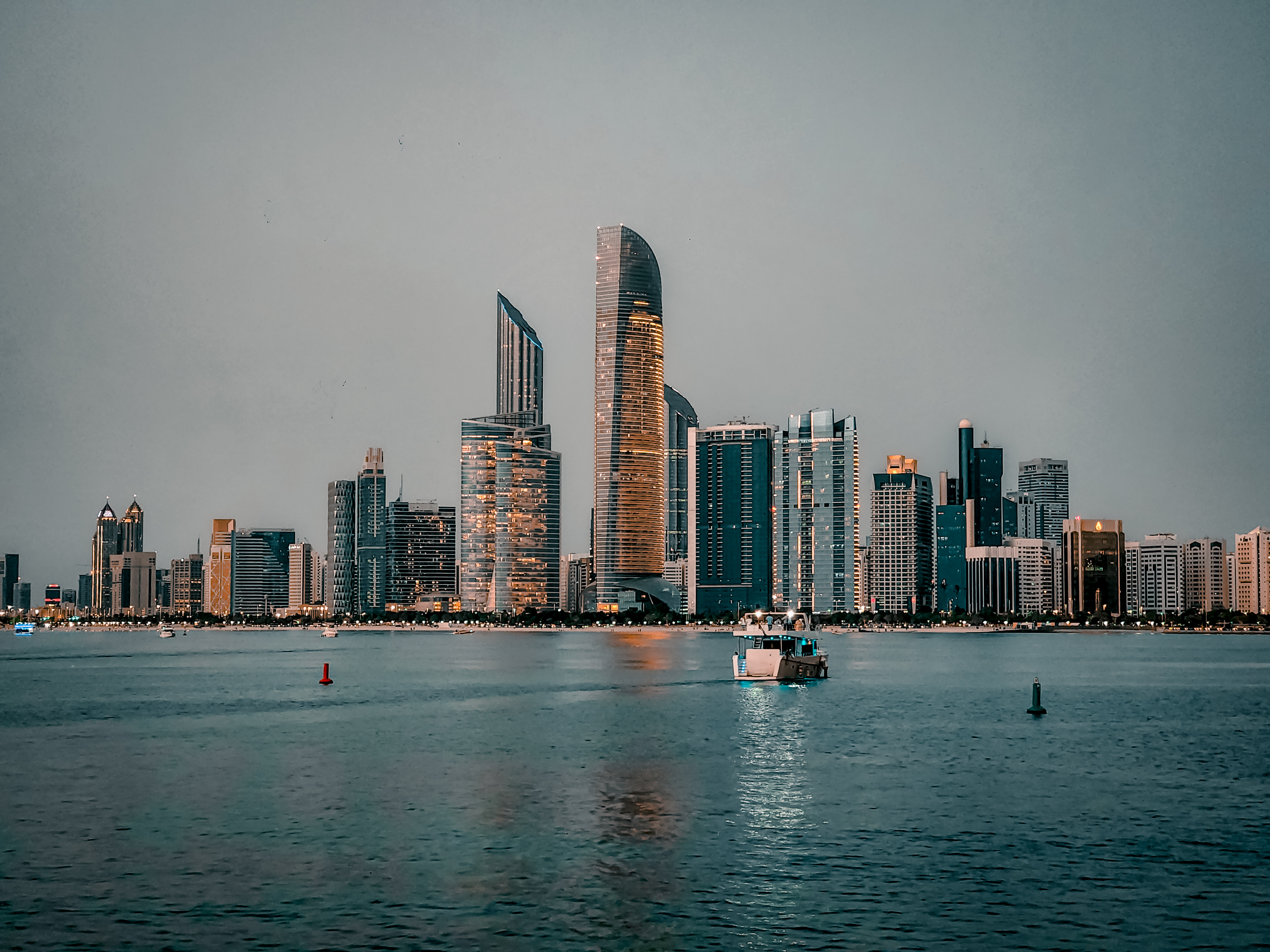
The skyline of Abu Dhabi

Abu Dhabi City is the capital of the Emirate of Abu Dhabi, and the local government of Abu Dhabi is directly led by the Ruler of Abu Dhabi. Abu Dhabi is the largest, and wealthiest of the seven emirates, and it plays a crucial role in the UAE's governance and economy. The Ruler has the executive authority to issue local laws, create or merge government departments, and appoint heads of departments.

The Ruler of Abu Dhabi appoints the Abu Dhabi Executive Council to lead the day-to-day management of government affairs. The Department of Municipal Affairs is responsible for municipal affairs for the entire emirate. Abu Dhabi is part of the Central Capital District, (Note: Not to be confused with the Central Business District of the city) which is separate from the eastern and western municipal regions of the Emirate of Abu Dhabi. The main settlement of the eastern region, officially "Al Ain Region" since a decree by Sheikh Khalifa in March 2017, is Al Ain City, and that of the western region, officially "Al Dhafra Region" as per the same decree, is Madinat Zayed.

The Government of the Emirate of Abu Dhabi officially leads both the city and greater emirate with agencies operating out of Abu Dhabi with branches in other cities. The Abu Dhabi Government has agencies and organisations operating across the emirate such as the Abu Dhabi Urban Planning Council and the Regulation and Supervision Bureau, which are responsible for infrastructure projects in the city.

Because Abu Dhabi is the capital of the UAE, it also serves as the headquarters of the Federal government of the United Arab Emirates, the office of the President of the United Arab Emirates, and seat of the Federal Supreme Council.

The Abu Dhabi Government Media Office (ADGMO) was formed in 2019 and is responsible for representing the government in the media, organising press conferences for the emirate and monitoring local and international media. It is a state-sponsored organisation that communicates the latest developments in the capital, and the emirate's vision, values and traditions.

== Cityscape ==
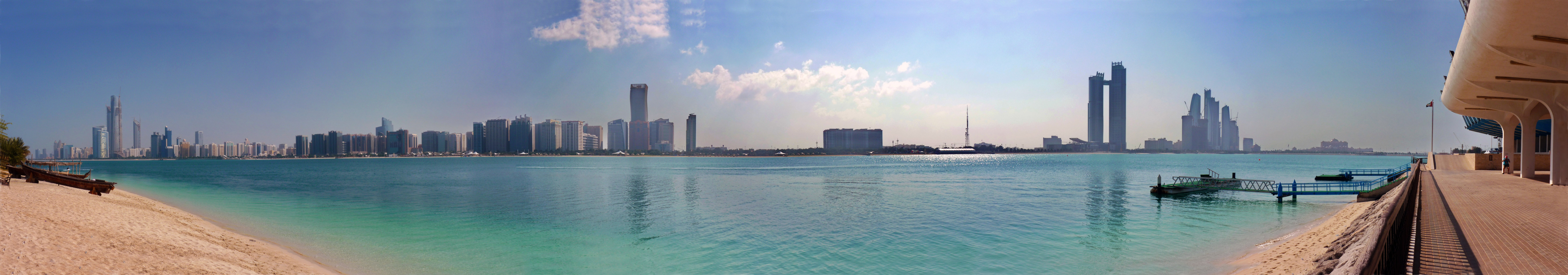
Abu Dhabi skyline as seen from the Marina

=== Architecture ===
ADIA Tower to the left and The Landmark at the right in Abu Dhabi

The city was planned under the guidance of Sheikh Zayed by Japanese architect Katsuhiko Takahashi in 1967 initially for a population of 40,000. The density of Abu Dhabi varies, with high employment density in the central area, high residential densities in central downtown and lower densities in the suburban districts. In the dense areas, most of the concentration is achieved with medium- and high-rise buildings. Abu Dhabi's skyscrapers such as the notable Burj Mohammed bin Rashid (World Trade Center Abu Dhabi), Etihad Towers, Abu Dhabi Investment Authority Tower, the National Bank of Abu Dhabi headquarters, the Baynunah (Hilton Hotel) Tower, and the Etisalat headquarters are usually found in the financial districts of Abu Dhabi. Other notable modern buildings include the Aldar Headquarters, the first circular skyscraper in the Middle East and the Emirates Palace with its design inspired by Arab heritage.

The development of tall buildings has been encouraged in the Abu Dhabi Plan 2030, which will lead to the construction of many new skyscrapers over the next decade, particularly in the expansion of Abu Dhabi's central business district such as the new developments on Al Maryah Island and Al Reem Island. Abu Dhabi already has a number of supertall skyscrapers under construction throughout the city.

Some of the tallest buildings on the skyline include the 382 m (1,253.28 ft) Central Market Residential Tower, the 324 m (1,062.99 ft) The Landmark and the 74-story, 310 m (1,017.06 ft) Sky Tower, all of them completed. Many other skyscrapers over 150 m (492.13 ft) (500 ft) are either proposed or approved and could transform the city's skyline. As of July 2008, there were 62 high-rise buildings 23 to 150 m (75.46 to 492.13 ft) under construction, approved for construction, or proposed for construction.

==== Sheikh Zayed Grand Mosque ====
The Sheikh Zayed Grand Mosque represents a key fixture of the city's architectural patrimony. Its construction was initiated under the administration of the late President Sheikh Zayed bin Sultan Al Nahyan, a key figure in the foundation of the modern United Arab Emirates.

The mosque was constructed with materials from countries around the world, including Italy, Germany, Morocco, Pakistan, India, Turkey, Iran, China, the United Kingdom, New Zealand, Greece, and the United Arab Emirates. More than 3,000 workers and 38 contracting companies took part in the construction of the mosque. Consideration of durability motivated the choice of many materials specified in the design of the structure. These materials include marble, stone, gold, semi-precious stones, crystals, and ceramics. Construction began on 5 November 1996. The building is large enough to safely contain a maximum of approximately 41,000 people. The overall structure is 22,412 square metres (241,240 square feet). The internal prayer halls were initially opened in December 2007.

As one of the most visited buildings in the UAE, the Sheikh Zayed Grand Mosque Center was established to manage the day-to-day operations, as a place of worship and Friday gathering and as a centre of learning and discovery through its education and visitor programs.

In July 2019, the Grand Mosque was listed among the top global attractions by TripAdvisor. As a part of its Travelers Choice Awards, the travel website placed the architectural masterpiece on number three out of the 750 landmarks considered from 68 countries.

In May 2021, the Sheikh Zayed Grand Mosque Center attended the Arabian Travel Market 2021 exhibition. This was part of the centre's core strategy to be active in the religious and cultural aspects of society.

==== The Founder's Memorial ====
The Founder's Memorial, a monument and visitor centre in Abu Dhabi, United Arab Emirates (UAE) is a memorial to Sheikh Zayed bin Sultan Al Nahyan, the first President of the United Arab Emirates, who died in 2004. The memorial consists of an open Heritage Garden and Sanctuary Garden at the centre of which is a cubic pavilion housing The Constellation, an artwork dedicated to Zayed's memory.

==== Presidential Palace ====
The UAE Presidential Palace, Qaṣr Al-Waṭan ("Palace of the Nation"), opened to the public in March 2019. It was built on the grounds of Ladies beach and construction was finished in 2018. Historically, 'barza' refers to a majlis session during which important matters can be brought to the attention of a Sheikh. After the Great Hall, it is the largest space in the UAE's Presidential Palace which holds up to 300 guests.

==== Multi-faith worship places ====
St. Paul's Church, Abu Dhabi

The Abrahamic Family House, a multi-faith complex on Saadiyat Island, includes the Imam Al-Tayeb Mosque, St. Francis Church, and the Moses Ben Maimon Synagogue, the UAE's first purpose-built synagogue. The project was inaugurated on 16 February 2023 and officially opened to the public on 1 March 2023.

On 22 September 2019, the Department of Community Development (DCD) in Abu Dhabi held a ceremony to grant licenses to 17 churches and the first-ever traditional Hindu temple. The listed churches were Catholic, Orthodox and Protestant churches, including St Joseph's Cathedral. The initiative was taken under the slogan "A Call for Harmony", to allow people from all religions and cultures to practice their faith in the country.

==== Qasr Al Hosn ====
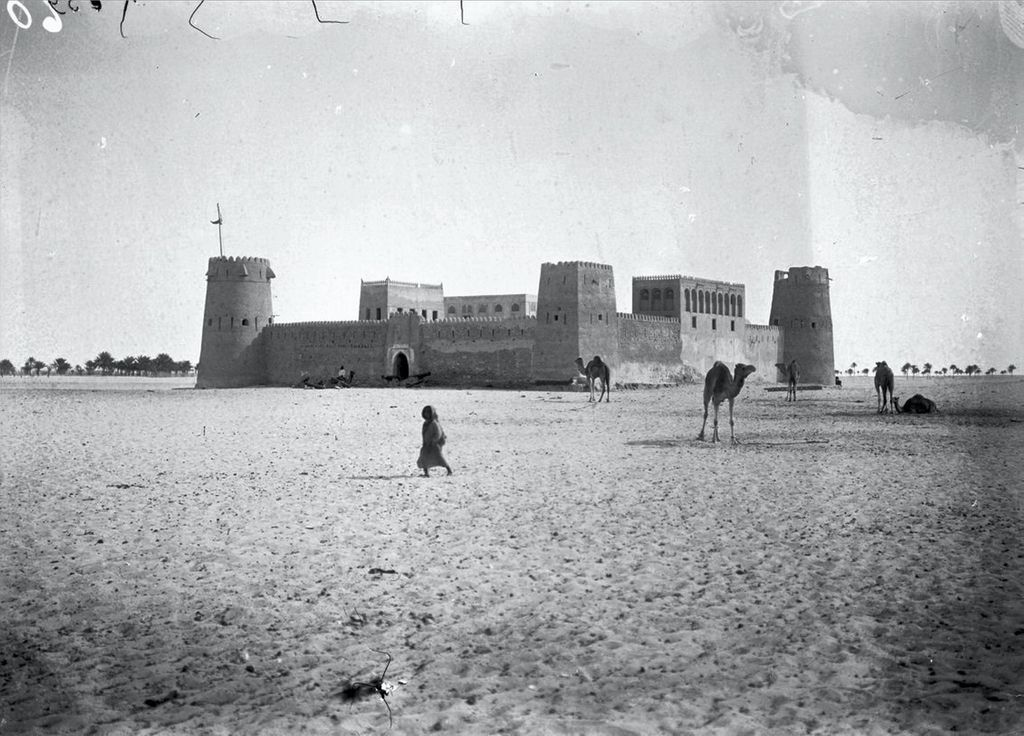
Photograph of Qasr Al Hosn from the early 20th century

Qasr Al Hosn is the oldest building in the Emirate of Abu Dhabi, built by the Bani Yas tribe in 1761. It was once the seat of the government and the palace of the ruling Al Nahyan family. Today, it is a museum open to all visitors portraying the history of Abu Dhabi and early lifestyles. It is where the visitors will notice the art Talli, a traditional form of decorative embroidery done by women, and the making of Al Sadu patterns which represent symbols of daily life. A three-screen mini-theatre is available which describes the traditional form of weaving practised by Bedouin women.

=== Parks, gardens, zoo, and beaches ===
Abu Dhabi has several parks, gardens, a zoo, and more than 400 kilometres (249 miles) of coastline, of which 10 kilometres (6 miles) are public beaches.

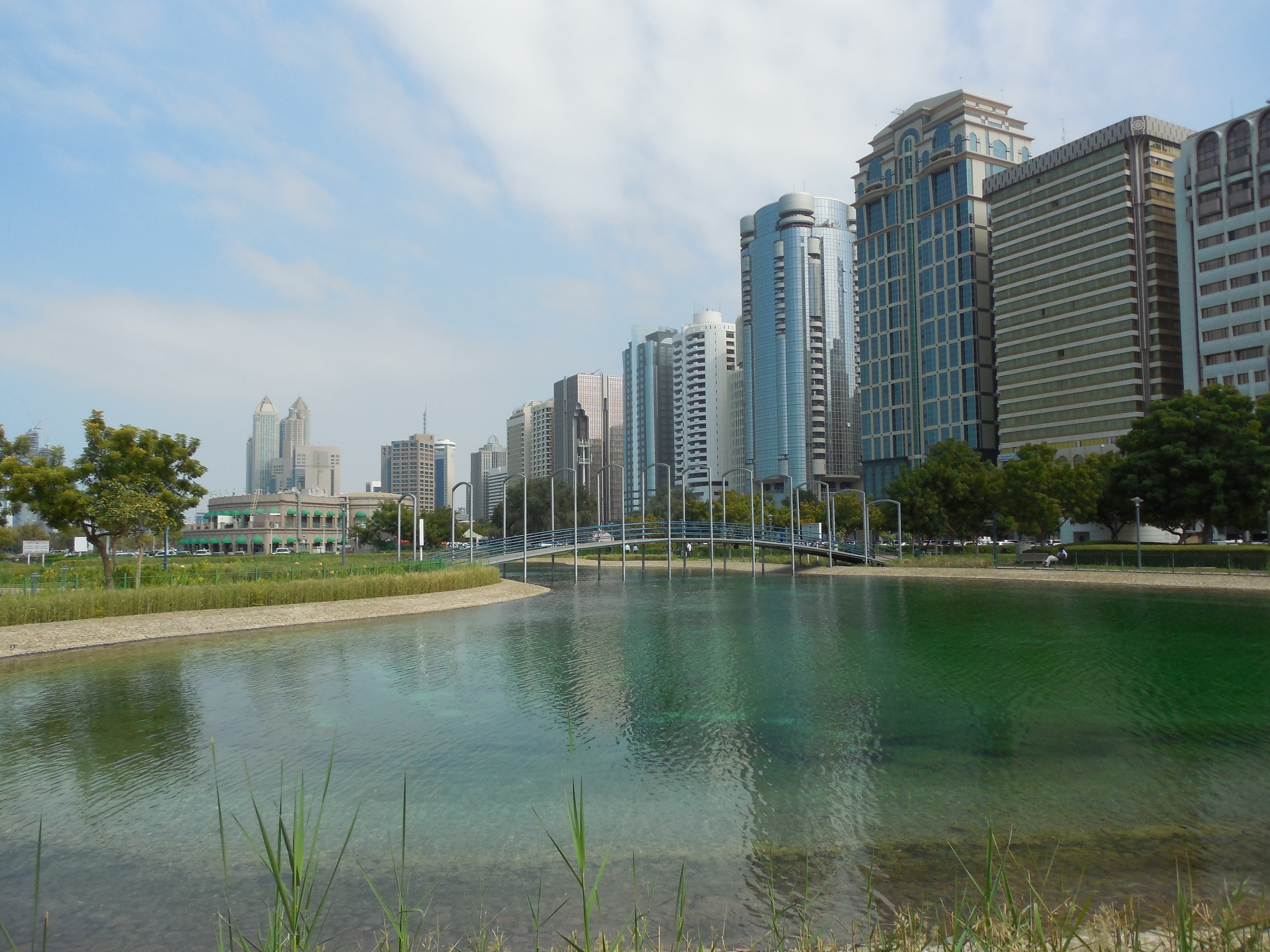
The Lake Park

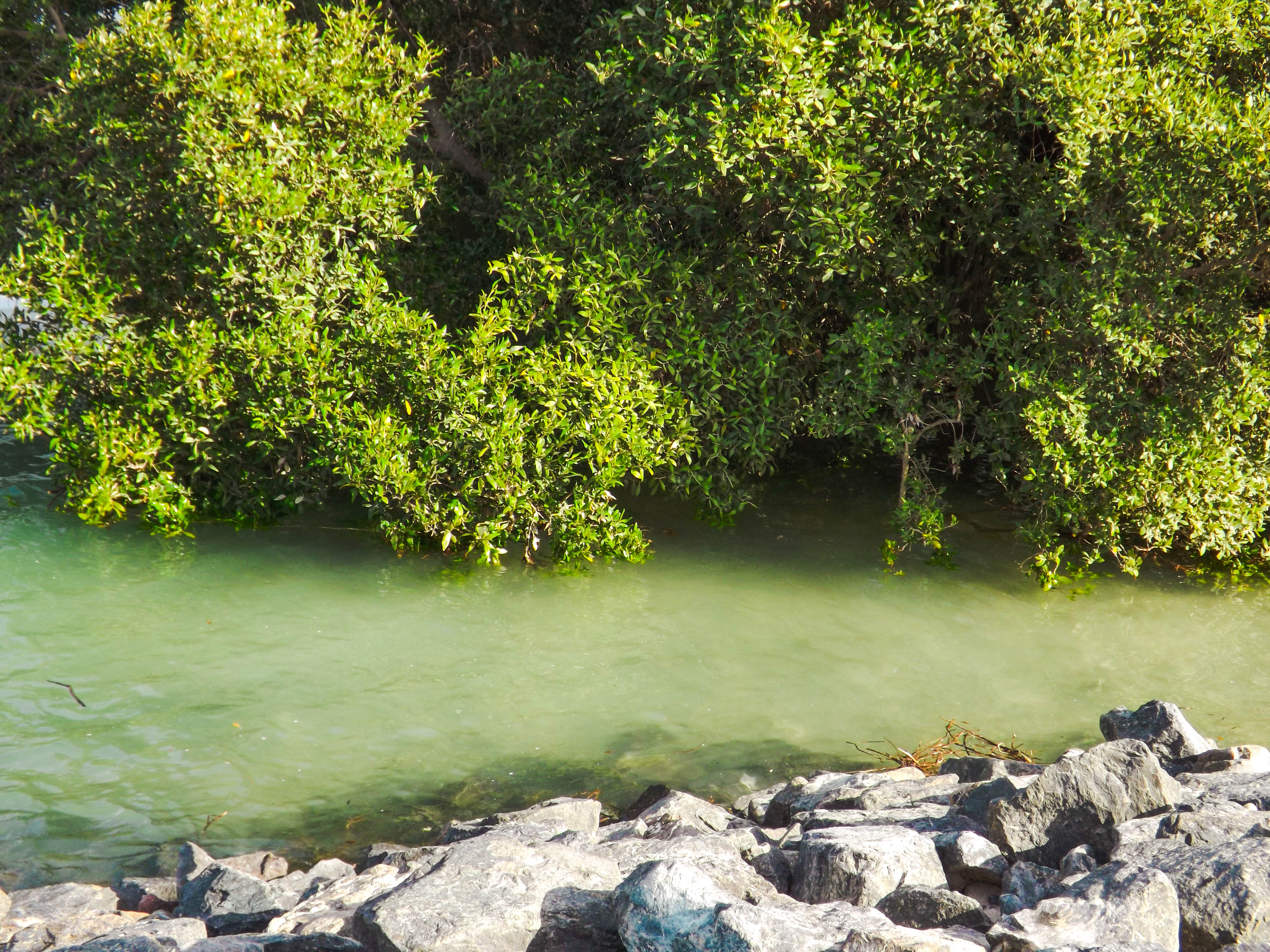
Mangroves at Mangrove National Park, near Al Qurm Corniche on Sheikh Zayed Bin Sultan Street in the eastern part of the city

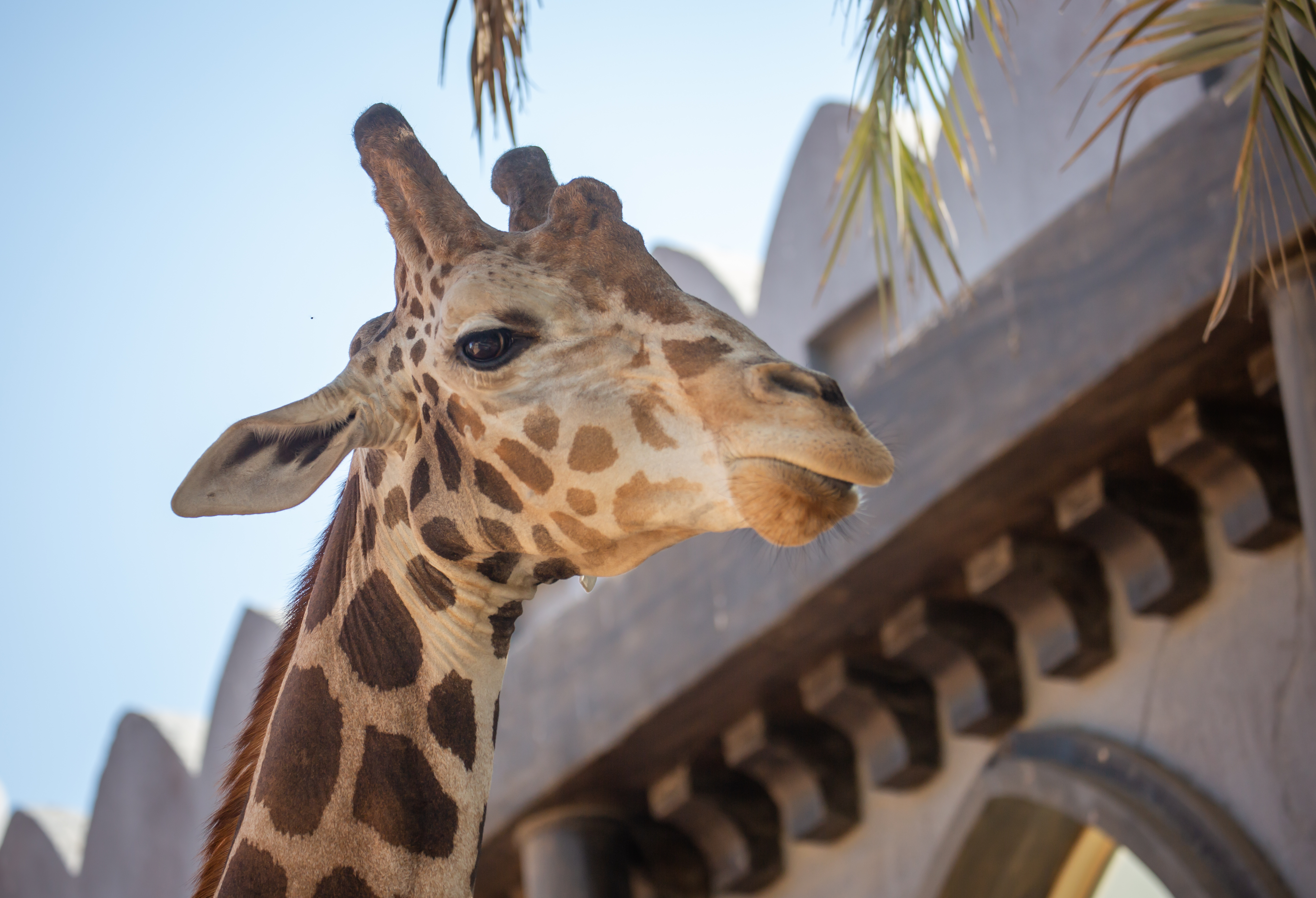
Giraffe at Emirates Park Zoo in Al Bahiyah, near the Abu Dhabi–Dubai highway

== Economy ==
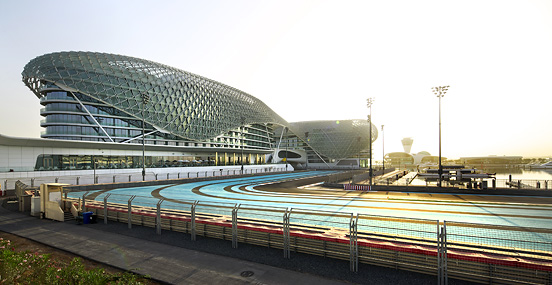
Yas Hotel Abu Dhabi

The UAE's large hydrocarbon wealth gives it one of the highest GDP per capita in the world and Abu Dhabi owns the majority of these resources 95% of the oil and 92% of gas. Abu Dhabi thus holds 9% of the world's proven oil reserves (98.2bn barrels) and almost 5% of the world's natural gas (5.8 billion cubic metres or 200 billion cubic feet). As of April 2022, oil production in the UAE was about 3.0 million barrels per day (BPD). The UAE is looking to expand its maximum production capacity from approximately 4 million BPD to 5 million BPD by 2030. In recent years, the focus has turned to gas as increasing domestic consumption for power, desalination and reinjection of gas into oil fields increases demand. Gas extraction is not without its difficulties, however, as demonstrated by the sour gas project at Shah where the gas is rich in hydrogen sulfide content and expensive to develop and process.

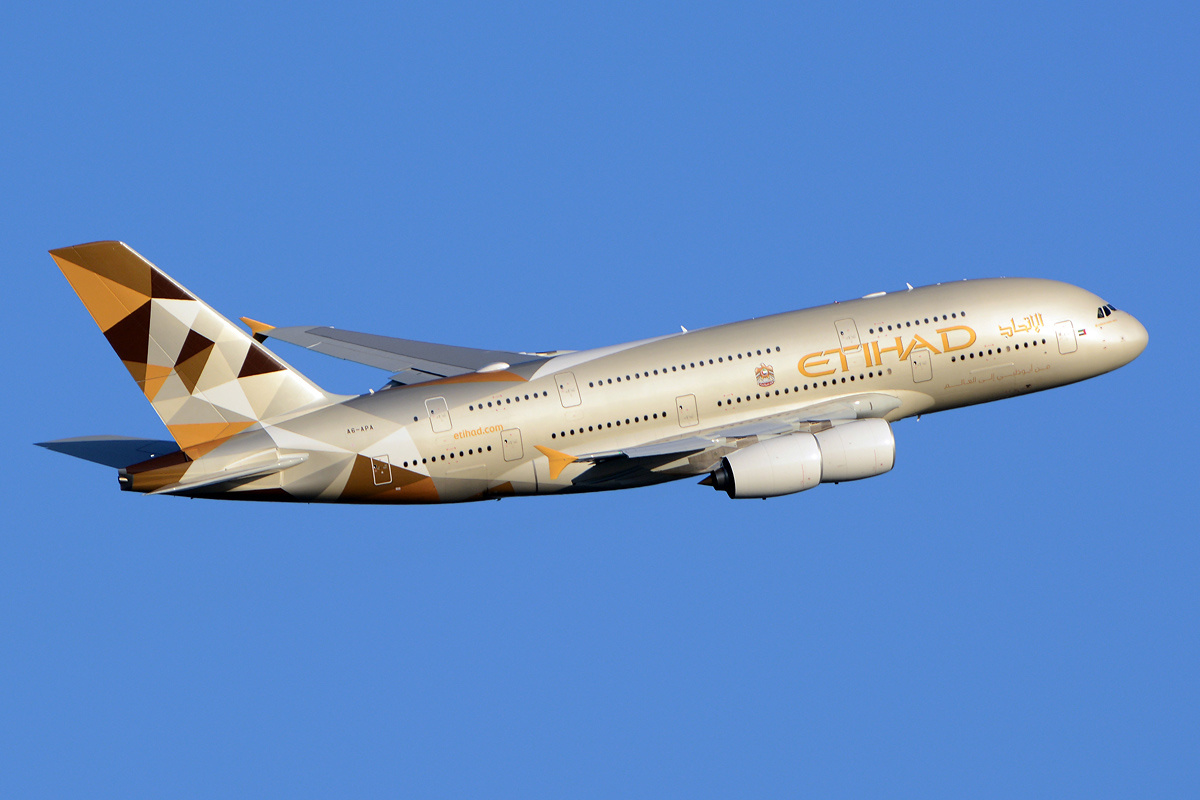
An Airbus A380 belonging to Etihad Airways, the second-largest airline in the UAE after Dubai-based Emirates

In 2009, the government diversified its economic plans. Served by high oil prices, the country's non-oil and gas GDP outstripped that attributable to the energy sector. Non-oil and gas GDP now constitutes 64% of the UAE's total GDP. This trend is reflected in Abu Dhabi with substantial new investment in industry, real estate, tourism and retail. As Abu Dhabi is the largest oil producer of the UAE, it has reaped the most benefits from this trend. It has taken on an active diversification and liberalisation program to reduce the UAE's reliance on the hydrocarbon sector. This is evident in the emphasis on industrial diversification with the completion of free zones, Industrial City of Abu Dhabi, twofour54 Abu Dhabi media free zone and the construction of another, ICAD II, in the pipeline. There has also been a drive to promote tourism and real estate with the Abu Dhabi Tourism Authority and the Tourism and Development Investment Company undertaking several large-scale development projects. These will be served by improved transport infrastructure, with a new port, an expanded airport and a proposed rail link between Abu Dhabi and Dubai all in the development stages.

Capital Gate The building is owned and was developed by the Abu Dhabi National Exhibitions Company.

Abu Dhabi's Emirate is the wealthiest of the UAE in terms of Gross domestic product (GDP) and per capita income. More than $1 trillion is invested worldwide in the city. In 2010, the GDP per capita reached $49,600, which ranks ninth in the world. Taxation in Abu Dhabi, as in the rest of the UAE, is nil for a resident or a non-bank, non-oil company. Abu Dhabi is also planning many future projects sharing with the Cooperation Council for the Arab States of the Gulf (GCC) and taking 29% of all the GCC future plannings. The UAE has a fast-growing economy: in 2006 the per capita income grew by 9%, providing a GDP per capita of $49,700 and ranking third in the world at purchasing power parity.

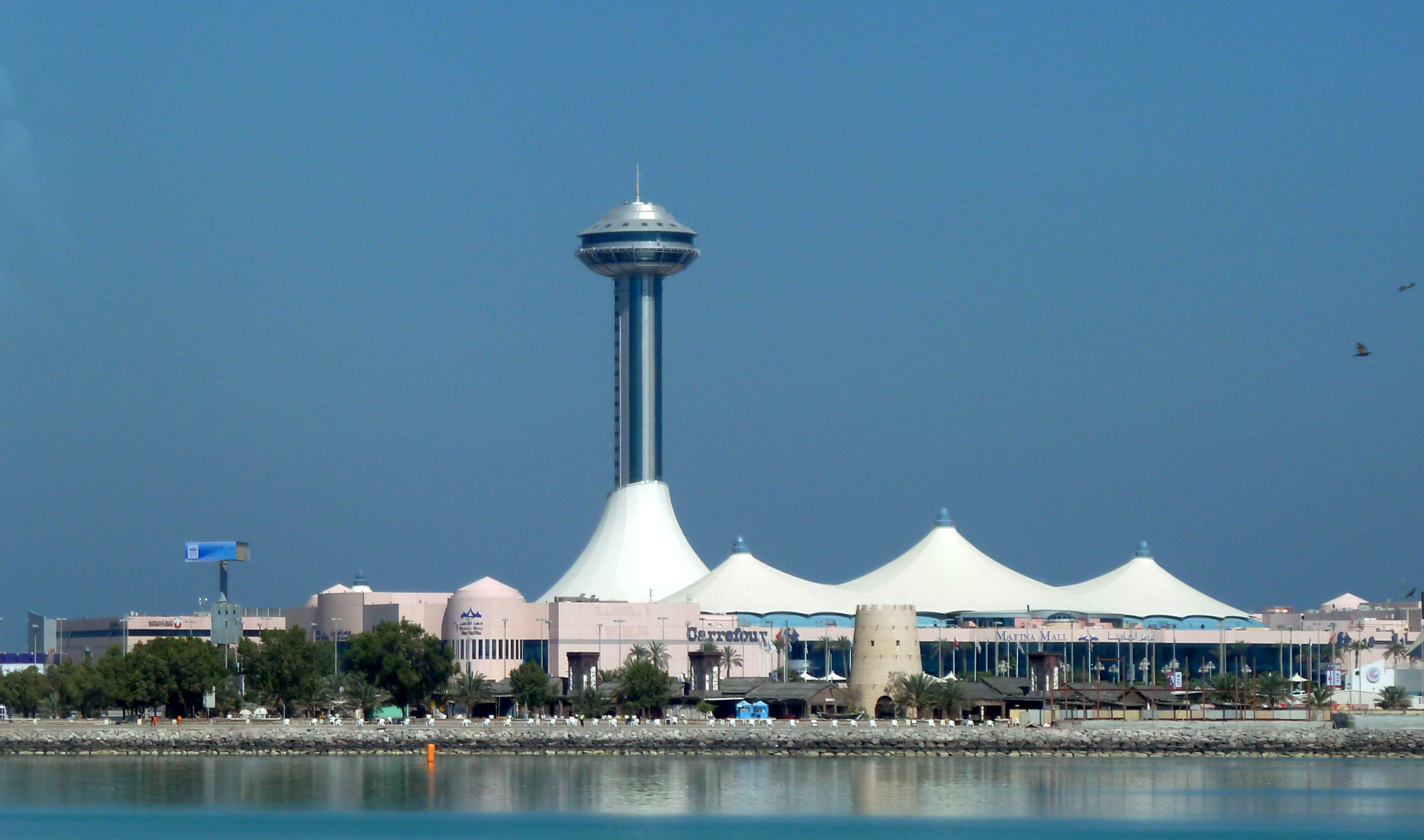
Marina Shopping Mall, one of the largest shopping malls in the city

Abu Dhabi's government is looking to expand revenue from oil and gas production to tourism and other things that would attract different types of people. This goal is seen in the amount of attention Abu Dhabi is giving its International Airport. The airport experienced a 30%+ growth in passenger usage in 2009. This idea of diversifying the economy is also seen in the Abu Dhabi Economic Vision 2030 planned by the Abu Dhabi Urban Planning Council. In this plan, Abu Dhabi's economy will be sustainable and not dependent on any single source of revenue. More specifically the non-oil portion of income is planned to be increased from about 40% to about 70%. As of July 2019, Abu Dhabi allocated $163 million to finance global entertainment partners as part of its plan to diversify the economy and wean it off oil.

Many Hollywood and other national film production teams have used parts of the UAE as filming locations. Neighbouring Dubai gets a lot of attention, but in recent years Abu Dhabi has become a popular destination. The Etihad Towers and Emirates Palace Hotel were some of the city's landmarks used as filming locations for the movie Furious 7, in which cars rush through the building and smashed through the windows of the towers.

In 2018, Abu Dhabi launched Ghadan 21, a string of initiatives to diversify the economy. The total injection is AED 50 billion. There are four main areas these initiatives must fall under: business and investment, society, knowledge and innovation, and lifestyle. The first phase includes over 50 initiatives that reflect the priorities of citizens, residents and investors.

== Utility services ==
The desalinated water supply and power production are managed by the Abu Dhabi Water and Electricity Authority (ADWEA). As of 2006, it supplied 560.2 MiGD (million imperial gallons per day) of water, while the water demand for 2005–06 was estimated to be 511 MiGD. The Environment Agency of Abu Dhabi (EAD) states that groundwater is the most significant source of water, as well as desalinated potable water, and treated sewage effluent. At 40.6 MiGD, the Umm Al Nar storage is the largest water source for Abu Dhabi, followed by the rivers Shuweihat and Taweelah. With falling groundwater level and rising population density, Abu Dhabi faces a severely acute water shortage. On average each Abu Dhabi resident uses 550 litres (120 imp gal; 150 US gal) of water per day. Abu Dhabi daily produces 1,532 tonnes of solid wastes which are dumped at three landfill sites by the Abu Dhabi Municipality. The daily domestic wastewater production is 330 MiGD and industrial waste water is 40 MiGD. A large portion of the sewerage flows as waste into streams and separation plants.

The city's per capita electricity consumption is about 41,000 kWh and the total supplied is 8,367 MW as of 2007. The distribution of electricity is carried out by companies run by SCIPCO Power and APC Energy. As part of UAE's Energy Strategy 2050 to reduce the carbon emission of power generation by 70%, Noor Abu Dhabi solar park project which is the largest solar project in the world was completed on 2 July 2019. The Abu Dhabi Fire Service runs 13 fire stations that attend about 2,000 fire and rescue calls per year.

State-owned Etisalat and private du communication companies provide telephone and cell phone service to the city. Cellular coverage is extensive, and both GSM and CDMA (from Etisalat and Du) services are available. Etisalat, the government-owned telecommunications provider, held a virtual monopoly over telecommunication services in Abu Dhabi prior to the establishment of other, smaller telecommunications companies such as Emirates Integrated Telecommunications Company (EITC – better known as Du) in 2006. The Internet was introduced into Abu Dhabi in 1995. The current network is supported by a bandwidth of 6 GB, with 50,000 dialup and 150,000 broadband ports.

Etisalat announced implementing a fiber-to-the-home (FTTH) network in Abu Dhabi during the third quarter of 2009 to make the emirate the world's first city to have such a network.

== City planning ==
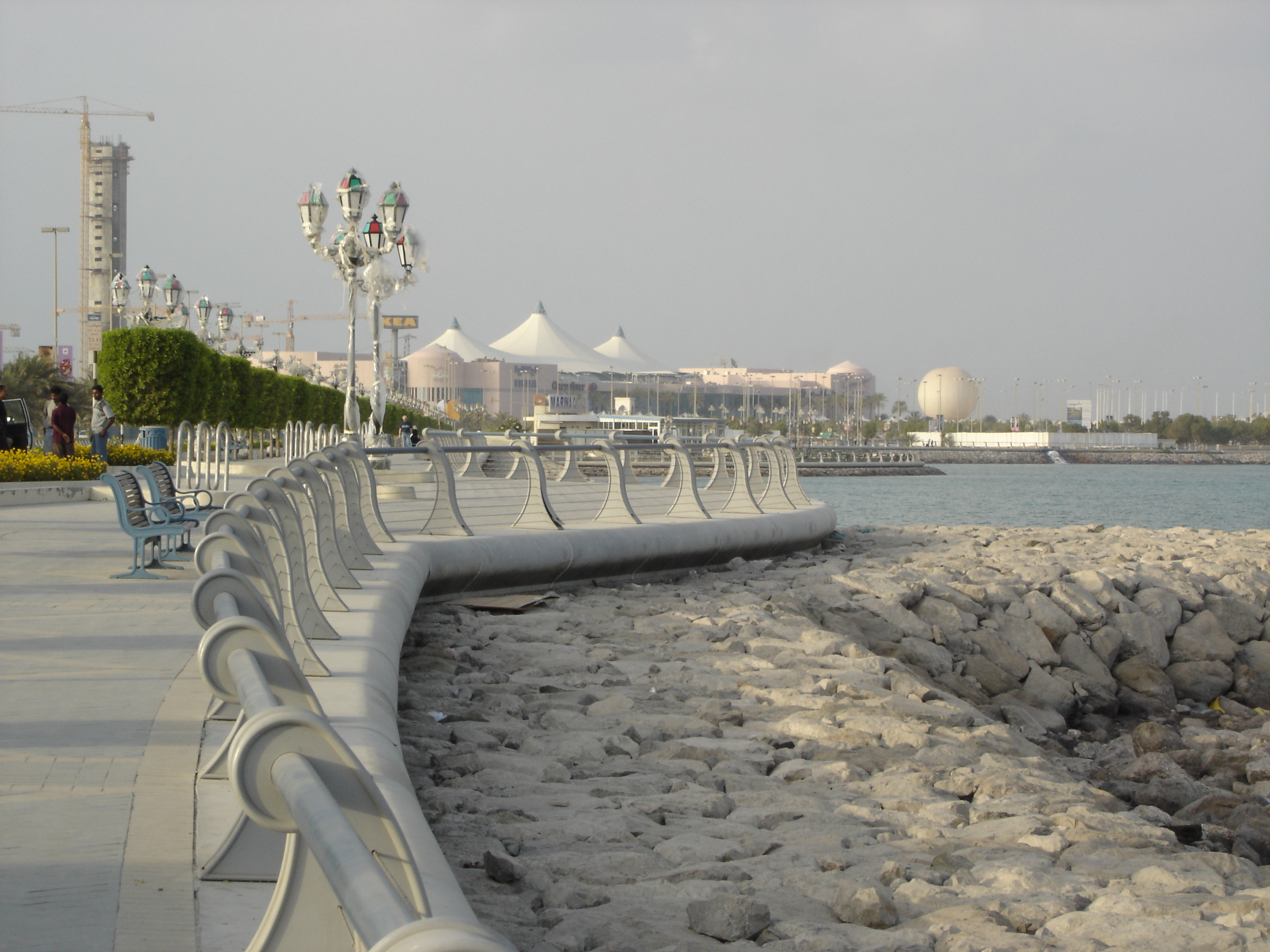
Waterfront park

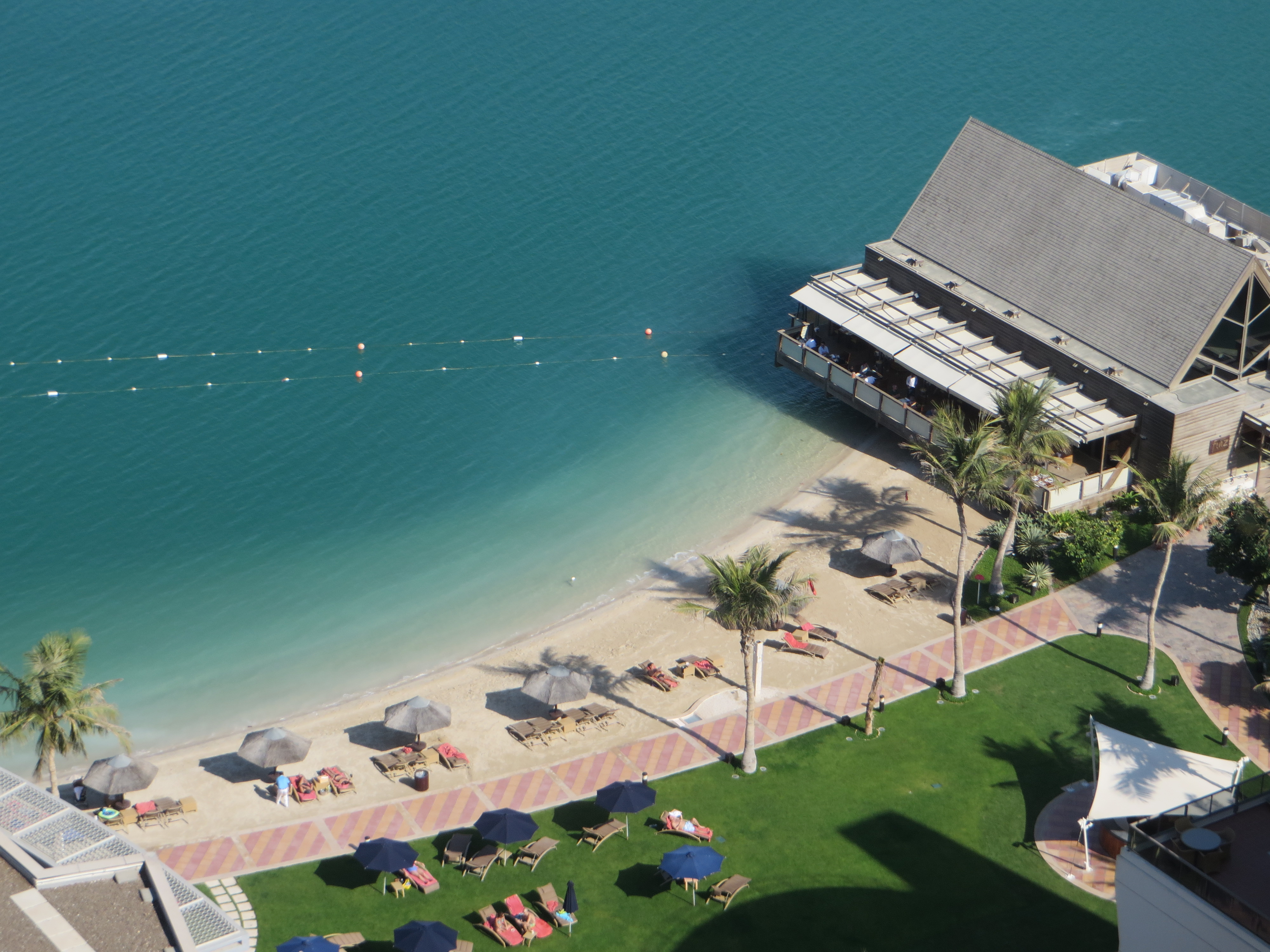
View of the Beach Rotana

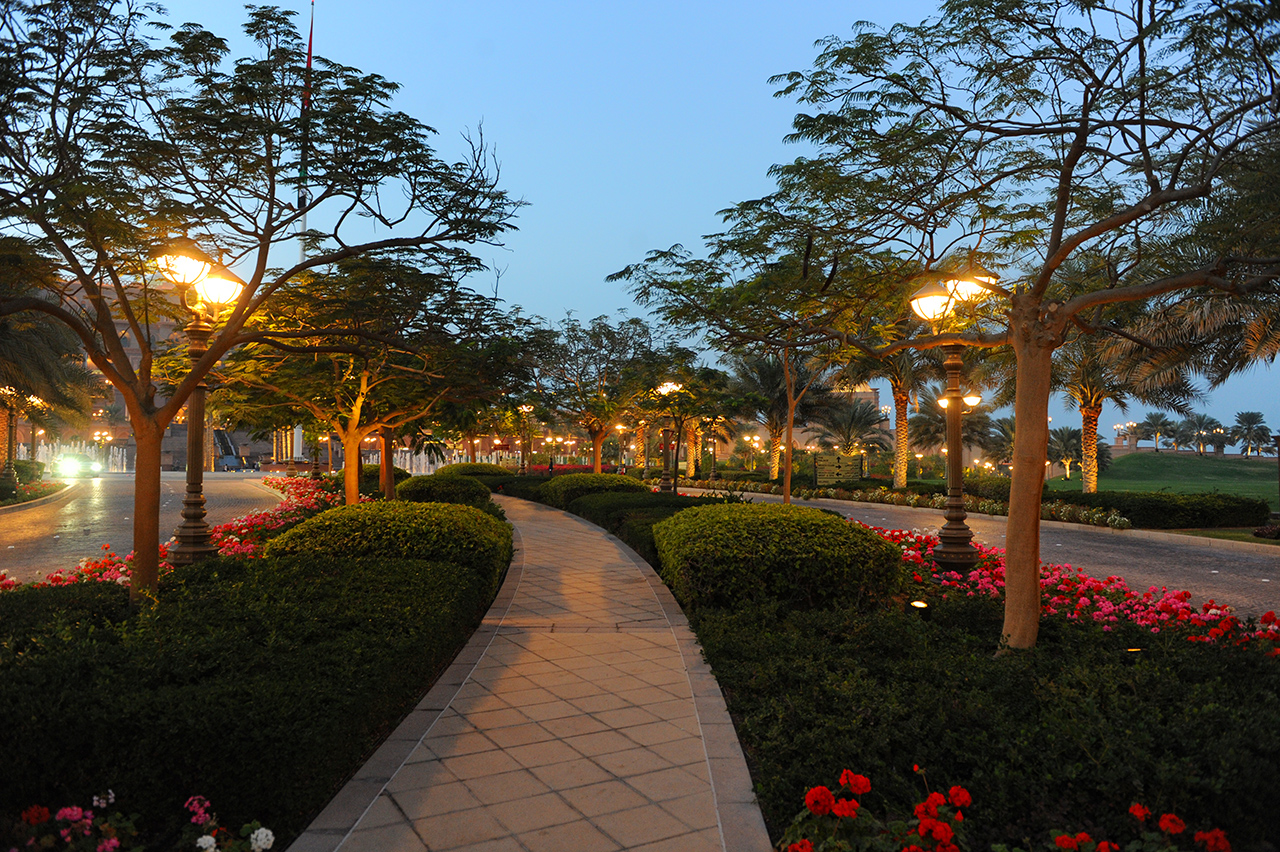
A public park

Abu Dhabi in the 1960s and 70s was planned for a predicted topmost population of 600,000. Following the urban planning ideals of the time period, the city has high-density tower blocks and wide grid-pattern roads. The population density is at its apex on the most northerly part of the island. At this point, the main streets have a large amount of 20- to 30-story towers. These towers are in a rectangular pattern, and inside is an ordinary grid pattern of roads with low rise buildings such as 2-story villas or 6-story low-rise buildings.

Due to this planning, a modern city with tall offices, apartment buildings, broad boulevards, and busy shops is present. Principal thoroughfares are the Corniche, Airport Road, Sheikh Zayed Street, Hamdan Street, and Khalifa Street. Abu Dhabi is known in the region for its greenery; the former desert strip today includes numerous parks and gardens. The design of the inner city roads and main roads are quite organised. Starting from the Corniche, all horizontal streets are oddly numbered, while all vertical streets are evenly numbered. Thus, the Corniche is Street No. 1, Khalifa Street is Street No. 3, Hamdan Street is Street No. 5, Electra Street is Street No. 7, and so on. Conversely, Salam Street is Street No. 8.

Mail is generally delivered to post-office boxes only; however, there is door-to-door delivery for commercial organisations. There are many parks throughout the city. Entrance is usually free for children, however, there is often an entrance fee for adults. The Corniche, the city's seaside promenade, is about 10 kilometres (6.2 mi) in length, with gardens, playgrounds, and a BMX/skateboard ring.

In 2007, the Abu Dhabi Urban Planning Council (UPC) was established, which is the agency responsible for the future of Abu Dhabi's urban environments and the expert authority behind the visionary Plan Abu Dhabi 2030 Urban Structure Framework Plan that was published in September 2007. The UPC is also working on similar plans for the regions of Al-Ain and Al-Gharbia.

Because of the rapid development of Abu Dhabi, a number of challenges to the city's urban organisation have developed, among them:

- Today, the city's population far surpasses the original estimated maximum population when it was designed. This causes traffic congestion, a shortage of car parking spaces, and overcrowding.
- Although there is an addressing system for the city, it is not widely used, causing problems in describing building locations. Directions must often be given based on nearby landmarks.
- However, there is a new naming system under the name of Onwani which is overhauling the entire addressing system of the entire Abu Dhabi Emirate. Its phases have already been implemented and are a success. The addressing system is up to international standards.

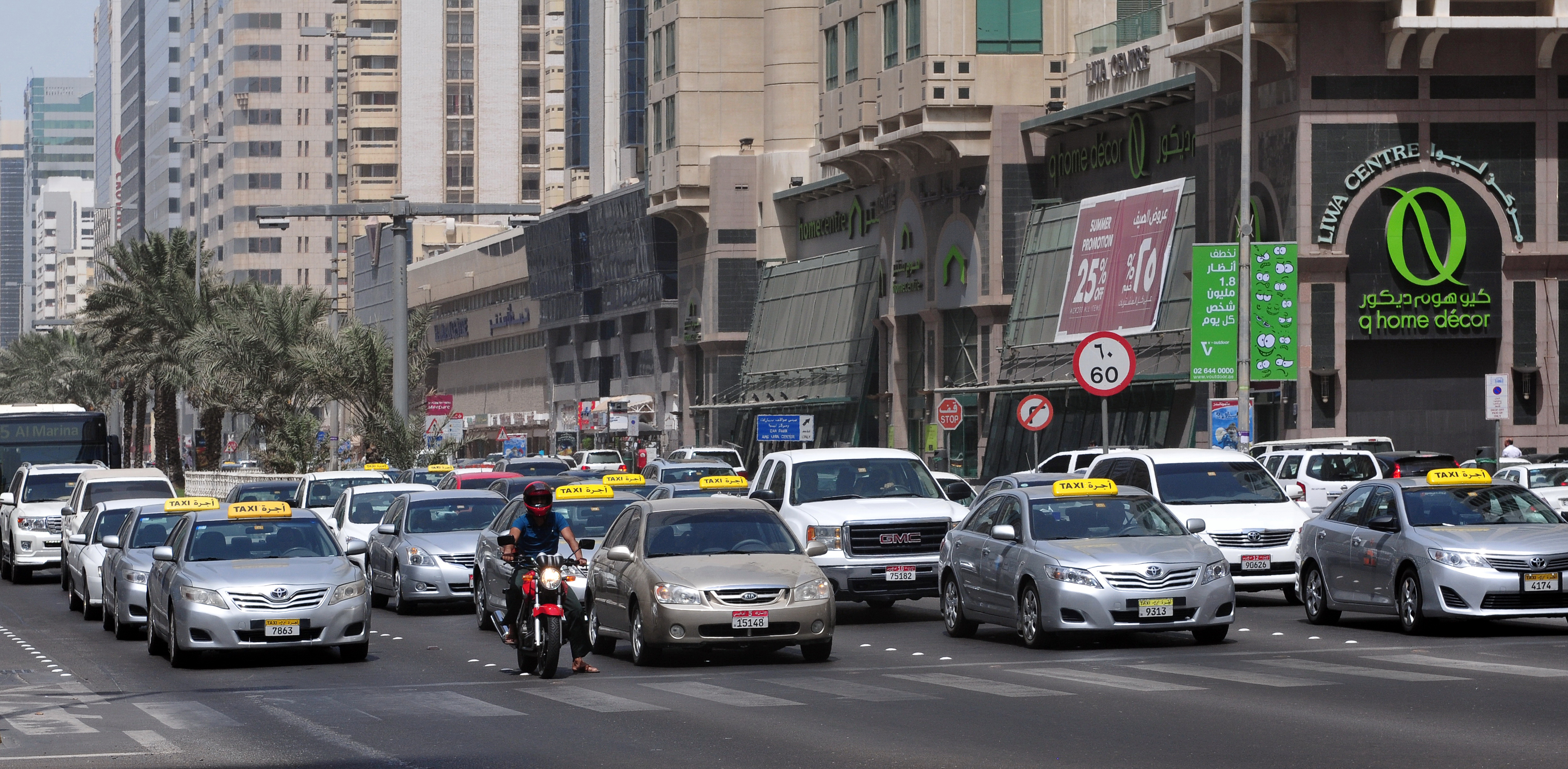
Busy road in downtown Abu Dhabi.

== Human rights ==
Human rights organisations have heavily criticised violations of human rights in Abu Dhabi. As with other parts of the UAE, foreign workers are not given proper treatment and many companies (both government and private) have yet to improve working conditions.

In 2025, Abu Dhabi was ranked as the safest city in the world for the ninth year running by the statistical analysis website Numbeo.

== Demographics ==
Historical population
Year	Pop.	±%
1960	25,000	—
1965	50,000	+100.0%
1969	46,400	−7.2%
1975	127,763	+175.4%
1980	243,257	+90.4%
1985	283,361	+16.5%
1995	398,695	+40.7%
2003	552,000	+38.5%
2009	896,751	+62.5%
2013	921,000	+2.7%
2014	1,205,963	+30.9%
2018	1,807,000	+49.8%
2023	2,595,000	+43.6%
The town of Abu Dhabi first conducted a census in 1968. All population figures in this table prior to 1968 are estimates obtained from populstat.info. Sources:

Abu Dhabi ranks as the 67th most expensive city in the world and the second-most in the region behind Dubai.

As of 2014, 477,000 of 2,650,000 people living in the emirate were UAE nationals. Approximately 80% of the population were expatriates. The median age in the emirate was about 30.1 years. The crude birth rate, as of 2005, was 13.6%, while the crude death rate was about 2%.

Article 7 of the UAE's Provisional Constitution declares Islam the official state religion of the UAE.

The majority of the inhabitants of Abu Dhabi are migrants from Nepal, India, Pakistan, Russia, Ethiopia, Somalia, Kenya, Bangladesh, Sri Lanka, the Philippines, China, Uganda, Ghana, the United Kingdom, France, Italy, Tanzania and various countries from across the Arab world. Some of these expatriates have been in the country for decades with only a few of them awarded citizenship. Consequently, English, Hindi-Urdu (Hindustani), Malayalam, Tamil, Telugu, Gujarati, Marathi, Tulu, Somali, Tigrinya, Amharic and Bengali are widely spoken.

The native-born population are Arabic-speaking Arabs who are part of a clan-based society. The Al Nahyan family, part of the al-Falah branch of the Bani Yas clan, rules the emirate and has a central place in society. There are also Arabs who are from other parts of the Arab world.

== Transportation ==
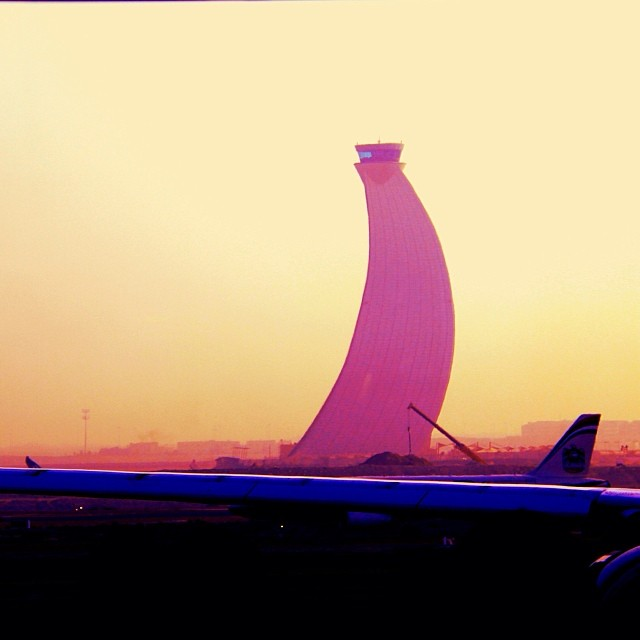
Air Traffic Control Tower of Zayed International Airport

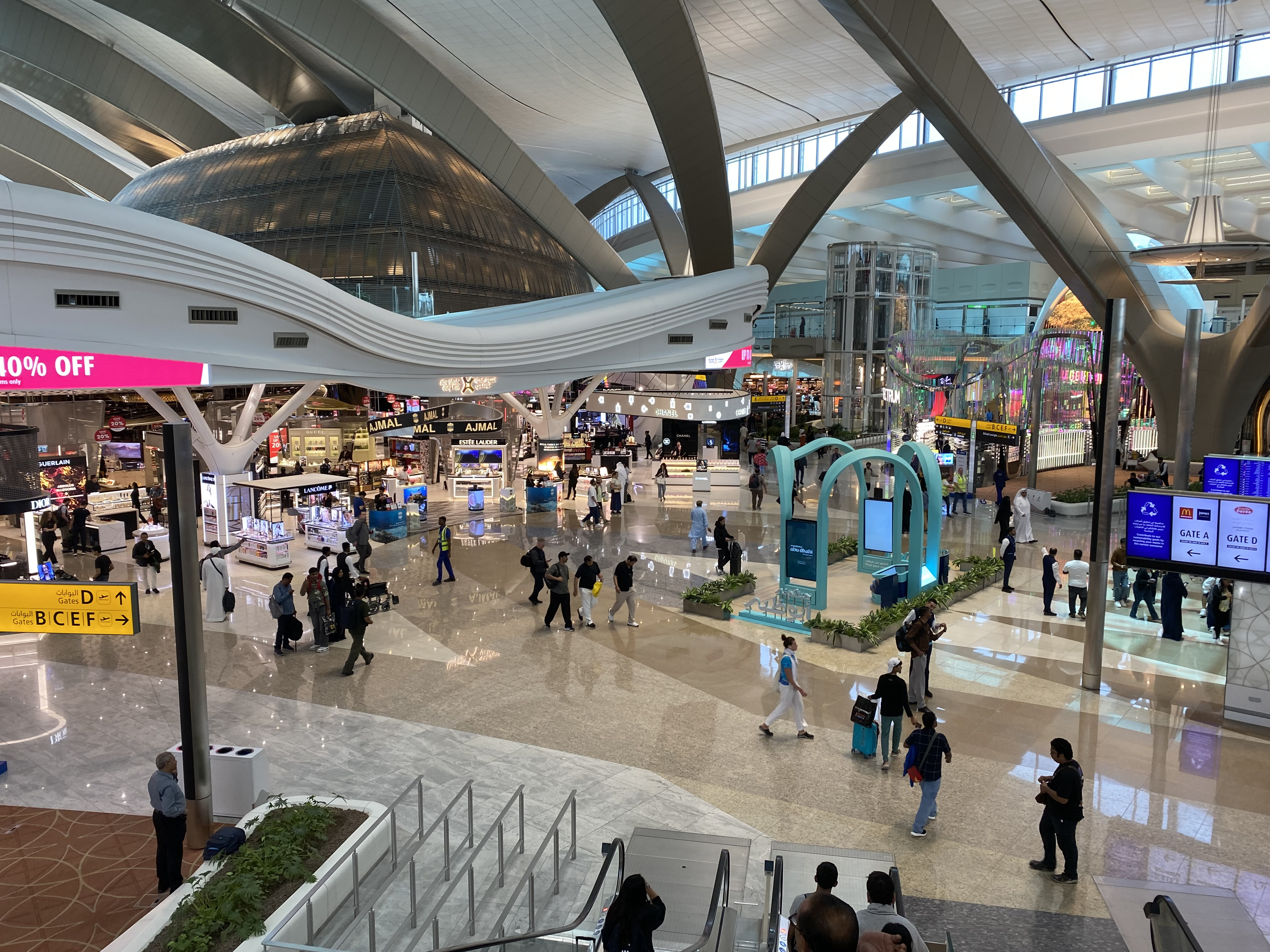
Terminal A at Zayed International Airport (2024)

Rapidly developing transportation in Abu Dhabi city is anchored by vast systems of highways connecting various islands and suburbs together alongside expanding public and private transport options.

=== Road ===
The main Abu Dhabi island is connected by three vast highways with their own bridges, the oldest of which is Al Maqta Bridge, built in 1968 as the first connection to the previously small fishing village on the island, now part of the E22 highway. The second Mussafah Bridge was opened in 1977, now part of the E20 highway that transforms into Khaleej Al Arabi Street, and the third bridge was the Sheikh Zayed Bridge opened in 2010, now part of the E10 highway and Sheikh Zayed Road, all of which connect the entire island to the Corniche Road, the 8 km promenade and beach at the tip of the island that overlooks the Persian Gulf. As the city expands, new bridges and roads have been constructed, or are currently under construction to link the main island with Al Maryah Island, Al Reem Island, Saadiyat Island, and other previously undeveloped islands. For example, in 2023, Sheikh Khaled bin Mohamed Al Nahyan inaugurated the Umm Yifeenah Bridge, an 11 km highway connection between Al Reem Island and Sheikh Zayed bin Sultan Street. This change, and many other, are a part of Abu Dhabi's 2030 Urban Structure Framework Plan.

=== Air ===
Zayed International Airport (AUH) is the city's main aviation hub and the second busiest airport in the UAE. Passenger numbers at Zayed International Airport rose by 17.2 percent in 2015, with more than 23 million travelers passing through its terminals during that year. A second runway and new terminal was also built recently. In July 2024, it was reported that the airport launched the world's first-of-its-kind "Smart Travel" biometric.

On 30 June 2019, the Department of Community Development (DCD) in Abu Dhabi officially inaugurated a multi-faith prayer room at Zayed International Airport. Located away from the main airport, the prayer room aims at enhancing the country's "position as an international hub for tolerance".

Abu Dhabi City is additionally served by the Al Bateen Executive Airport, situated on the main Abu Dhabi island, which was the old international airport for Abu Dhabi until AUH opened in 1982. The airport underwent renovation and expansion in 2022 to accommodate twin-aisle jets and resumed operation to private, business, and VIP traffic in addition to hosting an Abu Dhabi Police search and rescue base.

On 5 December 2024, Zayed International Airport in Abu Dhabi (AUH) won the title of "World's Most Beautiful Airport" at the Prix Versailles, a prestigious award for architecture and design. The award recognised its impressive architectural design in the Airports category. (WAM)

=== Rail ===
Abu Dhabi City is connected to the second phase of the Etihad Rail network, completed in 2023, for freight operations across the seven emirates. Passenger traffic has been confirmed and will allow for travel from Abu Dhabi city to other emirates on the network, however no date on commencement of operation has been set.

=== Public transport ===
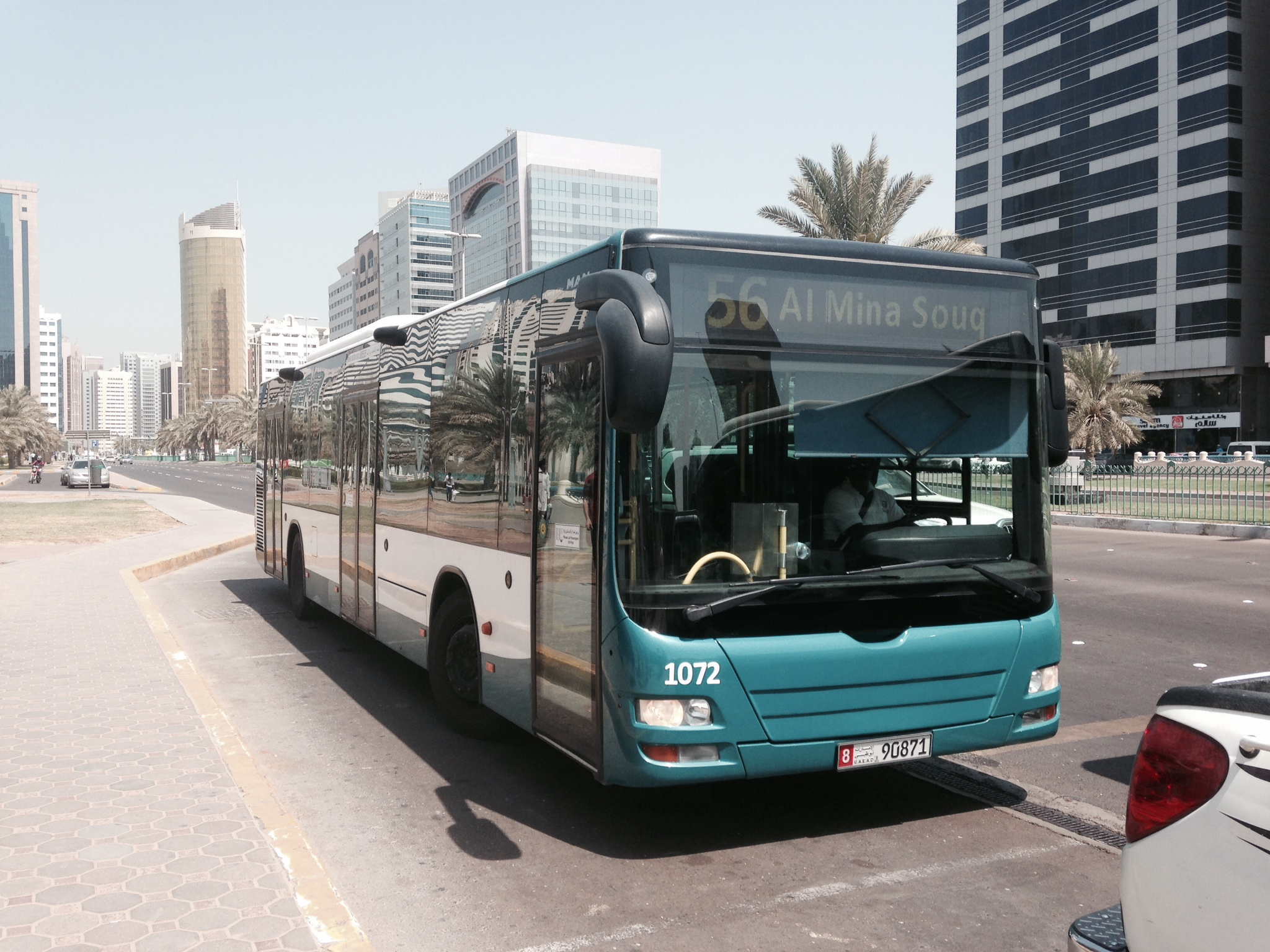
City Bus Number 56

Public transport systems in Abu Dhabi include public buses, taxis, ferries, and hydroplanes. A massive expansion of public transport is anticipated within the framework of the government's Surface Transport Master Plan 2030. The expansion was expected to see 130 km (81 mi) of metro and 340 km (210 mi) of tramways and bus rapid transit (BRT) routes. The city has nonetheless planned for further smart public transport options in various areas within the city, such as Yas Island and Saadiyat Island, in addition to expected rail service to other nearby cities.

==== Abu Dhabi Bus Service ====
The first town bus entered service in about 1969 but this was all part of a very informal service. There are other inter-city buses departing the Abu Dhabi central bus station; these inter-city buses are not only intra-emirate buses, but also inter-emirate services. On 30 June 2008, the Department of Transport began public bus service in Abu Dhabi with four routes. There are also public buses serving the airport. In an attempt to entice people to use the bus system, all routes were zero-fare until the end of 2008. The four routes, which operate between 6 am and midnight every day, run at a frequency of 10 to 20 minutes. Within the first week of service, the bus network had seen high usage. Some of the buses, which have a maximum capacity of 45 passengers, only had room for standing left. Some bus drivers reported as many as 100 passengers on a bus at one time. Due to the new, zero-fare bus service success, many taxi drivers were losing business. Taxi drivers have seen a considerable decrease in the demand for taxis while lines were forming for the buses.

As of 2021, the Abu Dhabi public bus system had completed 53.3 million passenger trips, with a fleet of 583 buses for the city of Abu Dhabi.

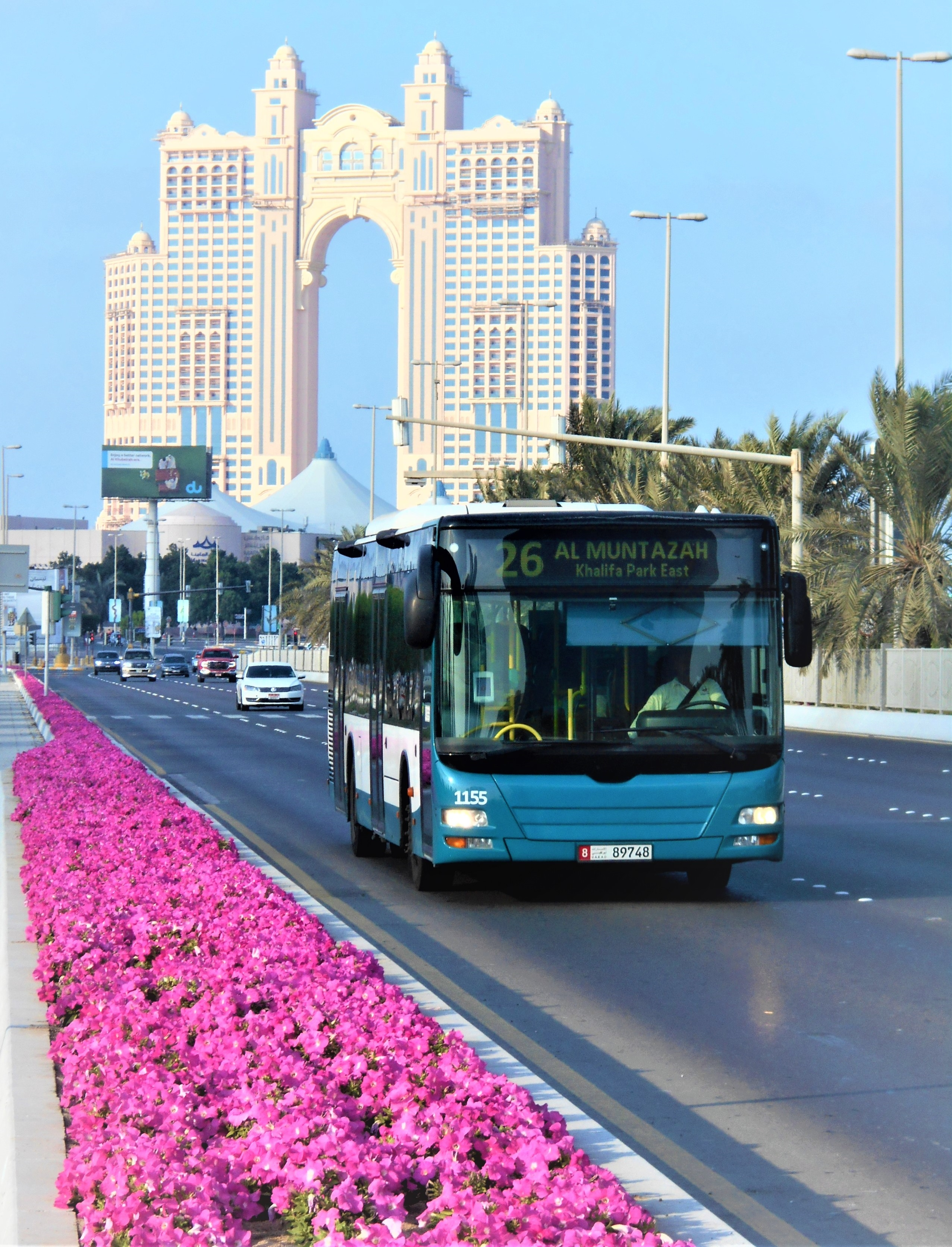
Public bus at a bus stop in Abu Dhabi

==== Smart Public Transportation ====
In 2022, Abu Dhabi launched autonomous self-driving public transport options in Yas Island and Saadiyat Island. The route in Saadiyat Island stops at cultural and tourist stops such as Louvre Abu Dhabi, NYU Abu Dhabi, and Sorbonne University Abu Dhabi whereas the Yas Island route focuses on the attractions in the island such as Ferrari World Abu Dhabi. The expansion include autonomous trams (Automated Rapid Transit or "ART"), taxis, and minibuses.

During October 2023, the Integrated Transport Centre (ITC) launched the ART Service on mainland Abu Dhabi as a pilot phase as part of the Smart Mobility project. It spans approximately 27 kilometres from Reem Mall, Al Reem Island, until Marina Mall, serving 25 stations in total.

In 2025, WeRide and Uber announced the launch of Level 4 fully driverless Robotaxi commercial operations. Public commercial operations commenced on 26 November without a vehicle specialist inside the AV, starting with Yas Island. This initiative is supported by Abu Dhabi's Integrated Transport Centre.

==== Water transport ====
The Emirate has many ports. One is Port Zayed. The others are Musaffah Port and Khalifa Port, which opened in 2012. They are owned by Abu Dhabi Ports Company and managed by Abu Dhabi Terminals. Water transport includes water taxis which can accommodate up to 12 passengers, and ferries which can carry up to 100 passengers on board. Water taxis can be hired for point-to-point travel across the city's waterways, offering a convenient option for shorter trips, and ferry transport system is a convenient and scenic way to travel between the city's islands and mainland.

In 2021, the number of passengers who used public ferries reached 114,093.

=== Toll Gates ===
Abu Dhabi introduced four toll gates in 2021 on all bridges (Sheikh Zayed Bridge, Maqtaa Bridge, Mussafah Bridge, and Sheikh Khalifa Bridge) entering the main Abu Dhabi island that only operate during peak hours, and by year-end had over 1.8 million registered cars in the system. Drivers must manually create an account to add balance to their toll gate allowance. Crossing the toll gate costs 4 AED. Abu Dhabi's toll gate system, known as Darb, is aimed at reducing traffic congestion and promoting smoother traffic flow. Drivers must register their vehicles on the Darb app or the official website. The system automatically deducts the toll charges from a prepaid account.

=== Flying Taxi Vertiport ===
Abu Dhabi's first flying taxi vertiport will open at the Zayed Port Cruise Terminal by late 2025. It will serve helicopters and eVTOLs, offering direct access to Saadiyat Island, the Corniche, and the Louvre Abu Dhabi.

== Culture ==
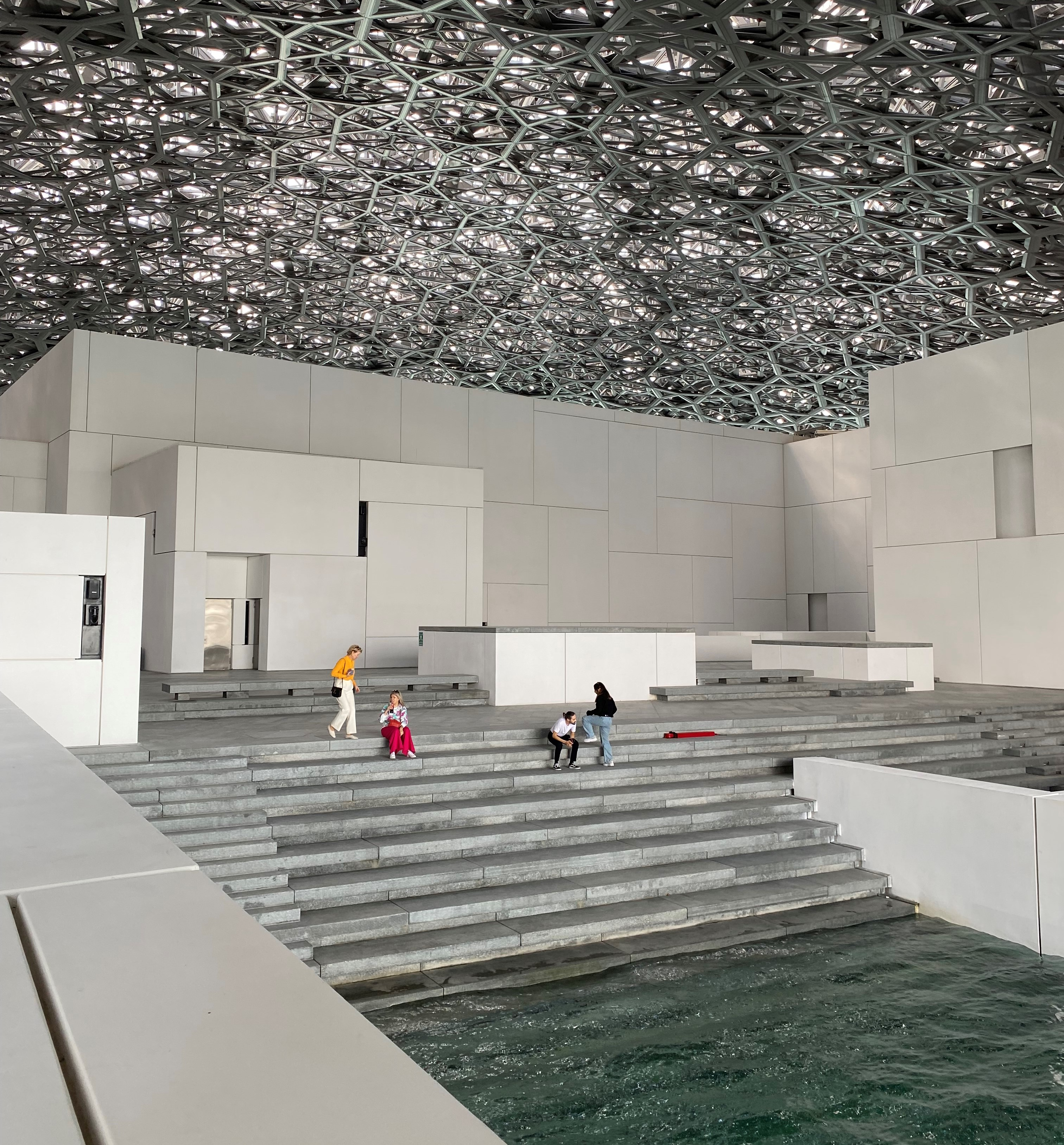
Louvre Abu Dhabi

Abu Dhabi has a diverse and multicultural society. The city's cultural imprint as a small, ethnically homogeneous pearling community was changed with the arrival of other ethnic groups and nationals—first by the Iranians in the early 1900s, and later by various African, Asian, European, and Middle Eastern ethnicities in the 1950s and 1960s. Abu Dhabi has been criticised for perpetuating a class-based society, where migrant workers are in the lower classes, and suffer abuse which "is endemic to the system".

Major holidays in Abu Dhabi include Eid al Fitr which marks the end of Ramadan, Eid ul-Adha which marks the end of Hajj, and National Day (2 December) which marks the formation of the United Arab Emirates.

This unique socioeconomic development in the Persian Gulf has meant that Abu Dhabi is generally more tolerant than its neighbours, including Saudi Arabia. Emiratis have been known for their tolerance; Christian churches, Hindu temples, Sikh gurdwaras (with the first synagogue commencing construction in 2020), and Buddhist temples can be found alongside mosques. The cosmopolitan atmosphere is gradually growing; as a result, there are a variety of African, Asian, European, Middle Eastern, and Western schools, cultural centres, and themed restaurants.

Abu Dhabi is home to several cultural institutions, including the Cultural Foundation and the National Theater. The Cultural Foundation, while closed for reconstruction as of spring 2011, is home to the UAE Public Library and Cultural Center. Various cultural societies such as the Abu Dhabi Classical Music Society have a strong and visible following in the city. The recently launched Emirates Foundation offers grants in support of the arts and to advance science and technology, education, environmental protection, and social development. The International Prize for Arabic Fiction (IPAF) will be based in Abu Dhabi. The city also stages hundreds of conferences and exhibitions each year in its state-of-the-art venues, including the Abu Dhabi National Exhibition Centre (ADNEC), which is the Persian Gulf's largest exhibition centre and welcomes around 1.8 million visitors every year.

The Red Bull Air Race World Series has been a spectacular sporting staple for the city for many years, bringing tens of thousands to the waterfront. Another major event is the Abu Dhabi International Petroleum Exhibition and Conference (ADIPEC).

The diversity of cuisine in Abu Dhabi reflects the cosmopolitan nature of society. Arab food is trendy and is available everywhere in the city, from the small shawarma to the upscale restaurants in the city's many hotels. Fast food and South Asian cuisine are also trendy and are widely available. The sale and consumption of pork, though not illegal, is regulated and sold only to non-Muslims in designated areas. Similarly, the sale of alcoholic beverages is regulated. A liquor permit is required to purchase alcohol; however, alcohol is available in bars and restaurants within four or five stars hotels. Shisha and qahwa boutiques are also popular in Abu Dhabi.

Poetry in Abu Dhabi and the UAE is highly regarded and often centres around satire, religion, family, chivalry, and love. According to an article from an Abu Dhabi tourism page, sheikhs, teachers, sailors, and princes make up a large bulk of the poets within the UAE. al-Khalil ibn Ahmad al-Farahidi formed a unique form of poetry to the UAE in the 8th century and was written in 16 metre. Another Emirati poet, Ibn Daher, is from the 17th century. Daher is important because he used Nabati poetry (AKA Bedouin poetry), a type of poetry written in the vernacular instead of classical/religious Arabic. Other important poets from the UAE are Mubarak Al Oqaili (1880–1954), Salem bin Ali al Owais (1887–1959), and Abdulla bin Sulayem (1905–1976). These poets made headway in Classical Arabic poetry as opposed to the Nabati poetry of the 17th century.

Today in Abu Dhabi, a group called the Abu Dhabi Cultural Foundation works to preserve the art and culture of the city. According to an article from the English Pen Atlas, Al Jawaher wal la'li was the first manuscript to come out of the UAE. According to another article, this book was written in the 1990s and was banned in the city for some time for making accusations about the ruling family.

For cultural influences, Abu Dhabi, since 2010, has become one of the major shooting spots for many film companies, including Hollywood. Some of the most famous films featuring Abu Dhabi are: The Kingdom (2007), Arrambam (2013), Baby (2015), Furious 7 (2015), Star Wars: The Force Awakens (2015), Dishoom (2016), War Machine (2017), Tiger Zinda Hai (2017), Race 3 (2018), Saaho (2019), Six Underground (2019), The Misfits (2021), Dune (2021), Vikram Vedha (2022), Crew (2024), Bade Miyan Chote Miyan (2024) and War 2 (2025).

In 2024, the Madison Square Garden Company confirmed that a second Sphere venue, identical to the Sphere in Las Vegas would be built in Abu Dhabi. The following year in 2025 it was confirmed that Disney would build a theme-park in Abu Dhabi called Disneyland Abu Dhabi. It will be located on Yas Island.

== Education ==
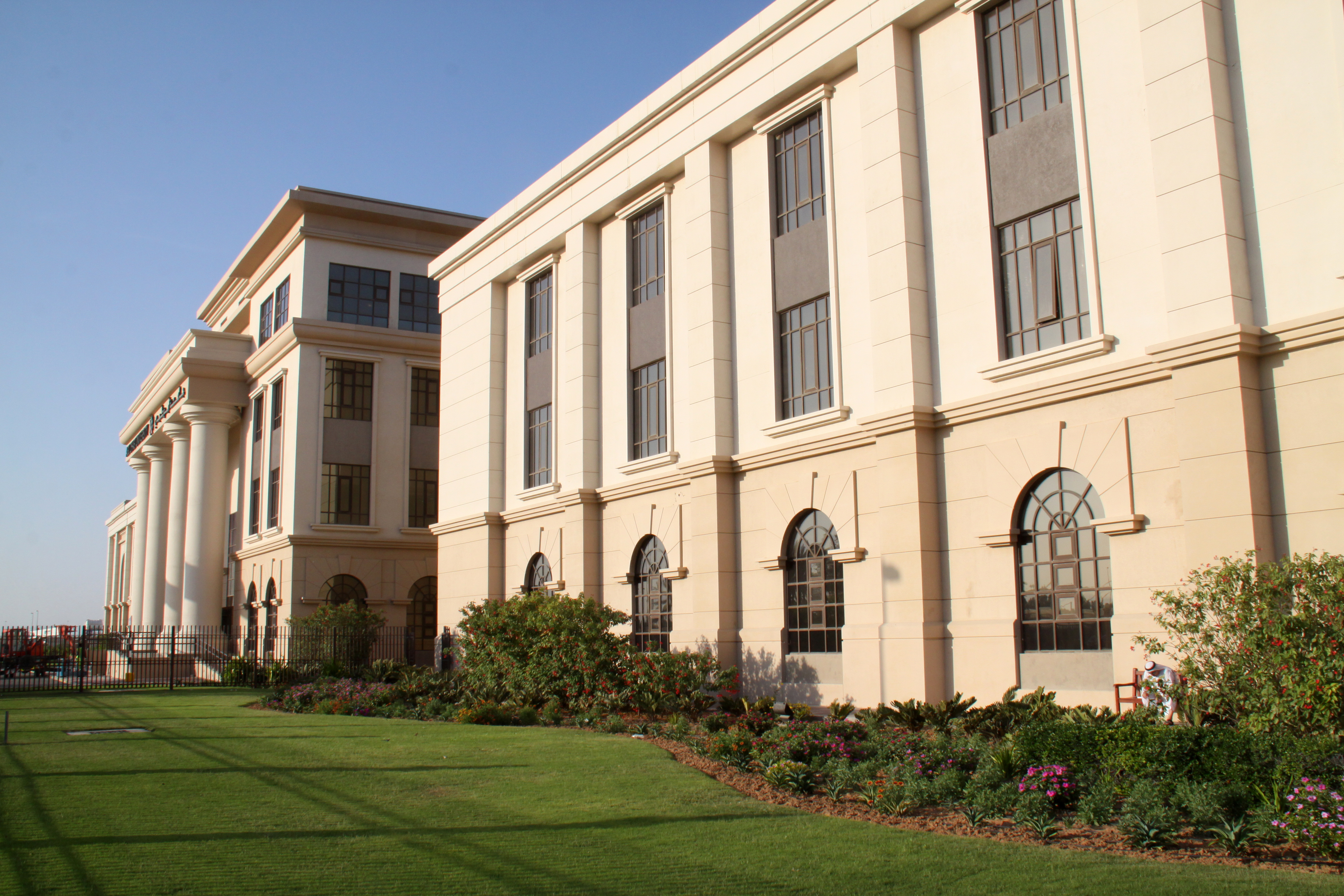
Abu Dhabi University

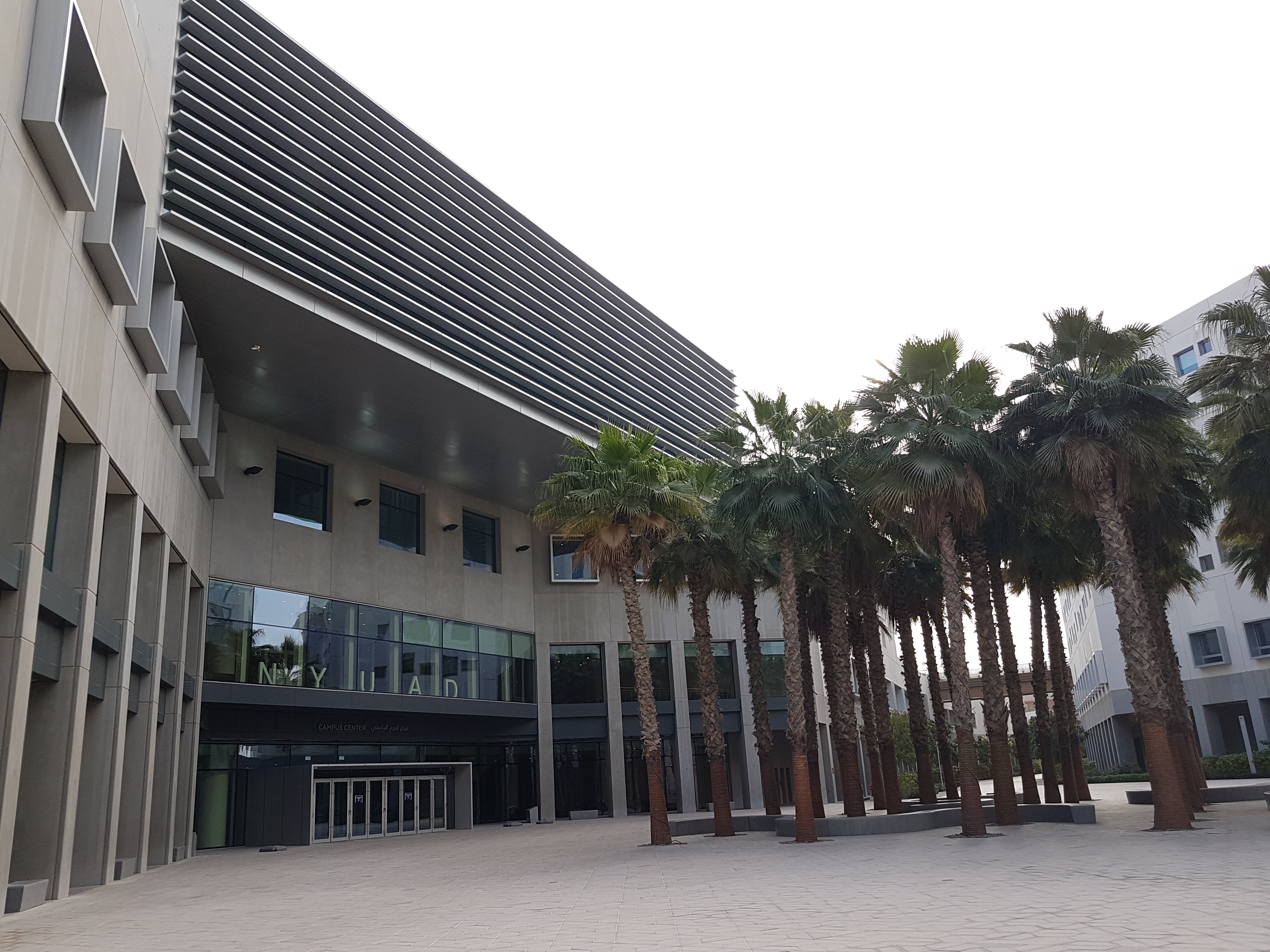
New York University Abu Dhabi campus on Saadiyat Island

Abu Dhabi is home to international and local private schools and universities, including government-sponsored INSEAD, New York University Abu Dhabi, Khalifa University, Higher Colleges of Technology, Sorbonne University Abu Dhabi, and Abu Dhabi University. New York University opened a government-sponsored satellite campus in Abu Dhabi in September 2010.

All schools in the emirate are under the authority of the Abu Dhabi Education Council. This organisation oversees and administers public schools and licenses and inspects private schools. From 2009, the council has brought over thousands of licensed teachers from native English speaking countries to support their New School Model Program in government schools.

Every year in the season of admissions, an exhibition is launched in Abu Dhabi Exhibition Center under government supervision. Universities from every corner of the world exhibit their career programs and scholarship programs. Heriot-Watt University, University of Bolton, Cambridge University, Oxford University, the Petroleum Institute, Khalifa University, and Abu Dhabi University attend.

In October 2019, Abu Dhabi announced the world's first graduate-level AI research institution, Mohamed bin Zayed University of Artificial Intelligence (MBZUAI). It enables graduation for students, businesses and governments to advance artificial intelligence. The university began accepting applications for masters and PhD programmes a year before the classes, which are scheduled to begin in September 2020.

== Sports ==
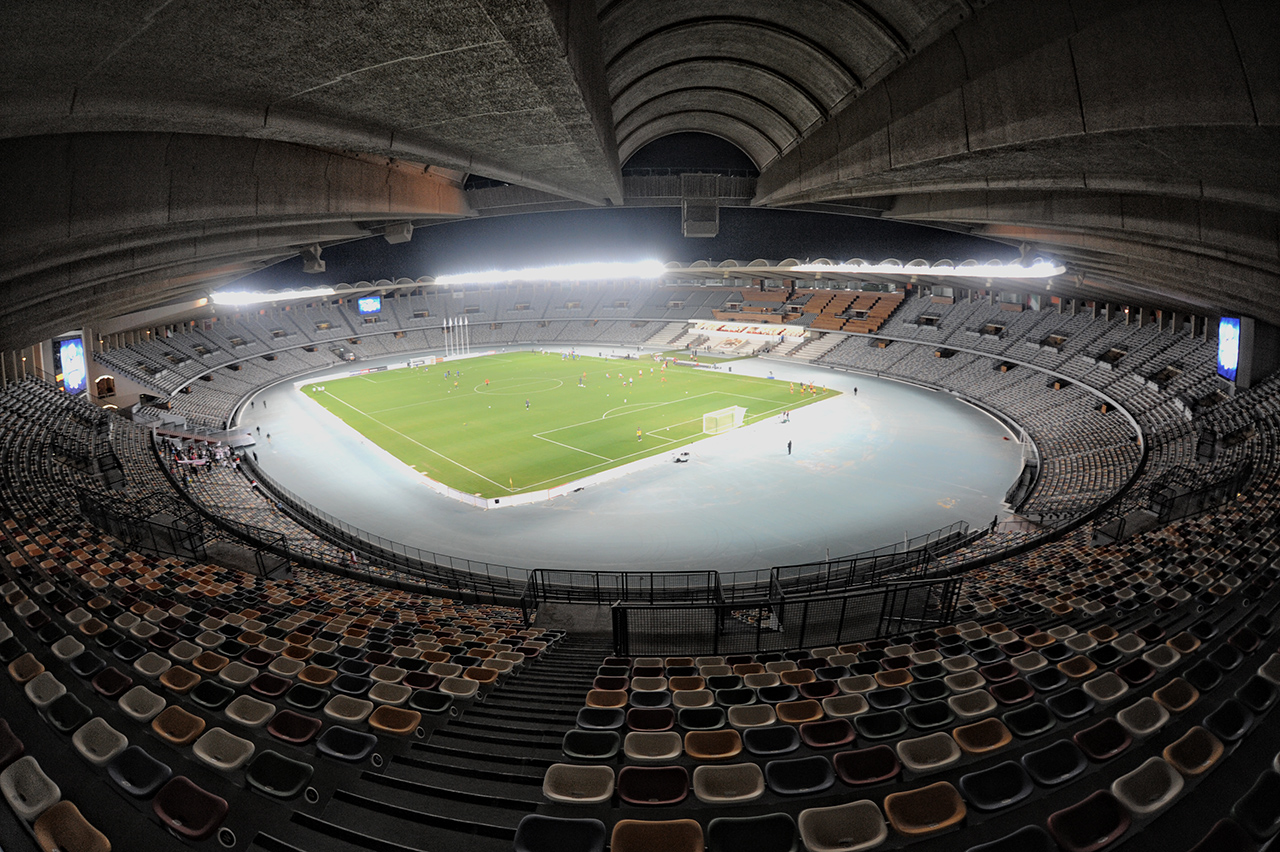
Abu Dhabi Zayed Sports City Stadium

Abu Dhabi has a diverse and expanding sporting culture underpinned by investments in sporting infrastructure and the hosting of global sporting events. Liwa Motorsport and traditional sports such as camel racing and equestrian sports have developed alongside popular modern sports such as Jiu-jitsu and football. Abu Dhabi follows the UAE's National Sport Strategy 2031 which aims to increase general participation in sports and expand the types and frequency of sport facilities available in the city.

=== Zayed Sport City ===
Zayed Sport City (ZSC) is a large free zone complex in the heart of Abu Dhabi city with a mixed-use of properties and sporting facilities to encourage sport participation. ZSC offers practice facilities for basketball, billiards, football, paintball, and a dedicated ice rink. The complex is also home to the Zayed Sports City Stadium, the largest in the UAE with a seating capacity of 45,000 and is the headquarters of the Abu Dhabi Sports Council, which is responsible for hosting events in the city and Mubadala Arena, the home of the UAE Jiu Jitsu team.

=== Jiu Jitsu ===
Jiu Jitsu is a popular sport in the city with a dedicated complex in the Mubadala Arena. It is a 'Soft Art' originated from the ancient martial art of the Samurai in Japan several centuries ago and it has been adopted by Brazil in the early 1900s. Jiu Jitsu does not include punches or kicks, but it applies the techniques such as throws, control positions and locks. Abu Dhabi government's Abu Dhabi Education Council (ADEC) maintains a comprehensive after-school program for interested and talented jiujitsu students. The Abu Dhabi Jiujitsu Schools Program began in 2008 under the patronage of crown prince (now President) Mohammed bin Zayed Al Nahyan, a keen Brazilian jiu-jitsu competitor. The program launched in 14 schools for pupils in grades 6 and 7 and has since expanded to 42 government schools, with 81 Brazilian coaches brought in as instructors.

9 to 13-year-old students are taught Brazilian jiu-jitsu as part of the curriculum. The plan is for up to 500 schools to be participating in the school-Jitsu program by 2015. The project was set up by special request of Sheikh Mohammad bin Zayed Al Nahyan to the head coach of the Emirates jiu-jitsu team, Carlos "Carlão" Santos, now also the managing director of the School-Jitsu Project.

=== Football ===
Football is the most popular sport in the city and the city has four football stadiums, namely Al Jazeera Stadium, Al Wahda Stadium, Sheikh Zayed Football Stadium (Zayed Sports City) and Hazza Stadium. The city hosts the Al Jazira Club, Al Wahda FC, and Baniyas Club, all of which compete at the UAE Pro League. In addition to local tournaments, the city has hosted international football events including five FIFA Club World Cup and the 2019 AFC Asian Cup.

=== Abu Dhabi Formula 1 Grand Prix ===
The city hosts the Abu Dhabi Grand Prix of Formula One, which has been held at the Yas Marina Circuit since 2009. The race takes place late in the Formula One season in November or December, and it is usually the last race of the season. The Yas Marina Circuit is one of the most expensive racing tracks built and regularly hosts various other local races and tours. The circuit has also hosted other events such as the V8 Supercars series of Dubai.

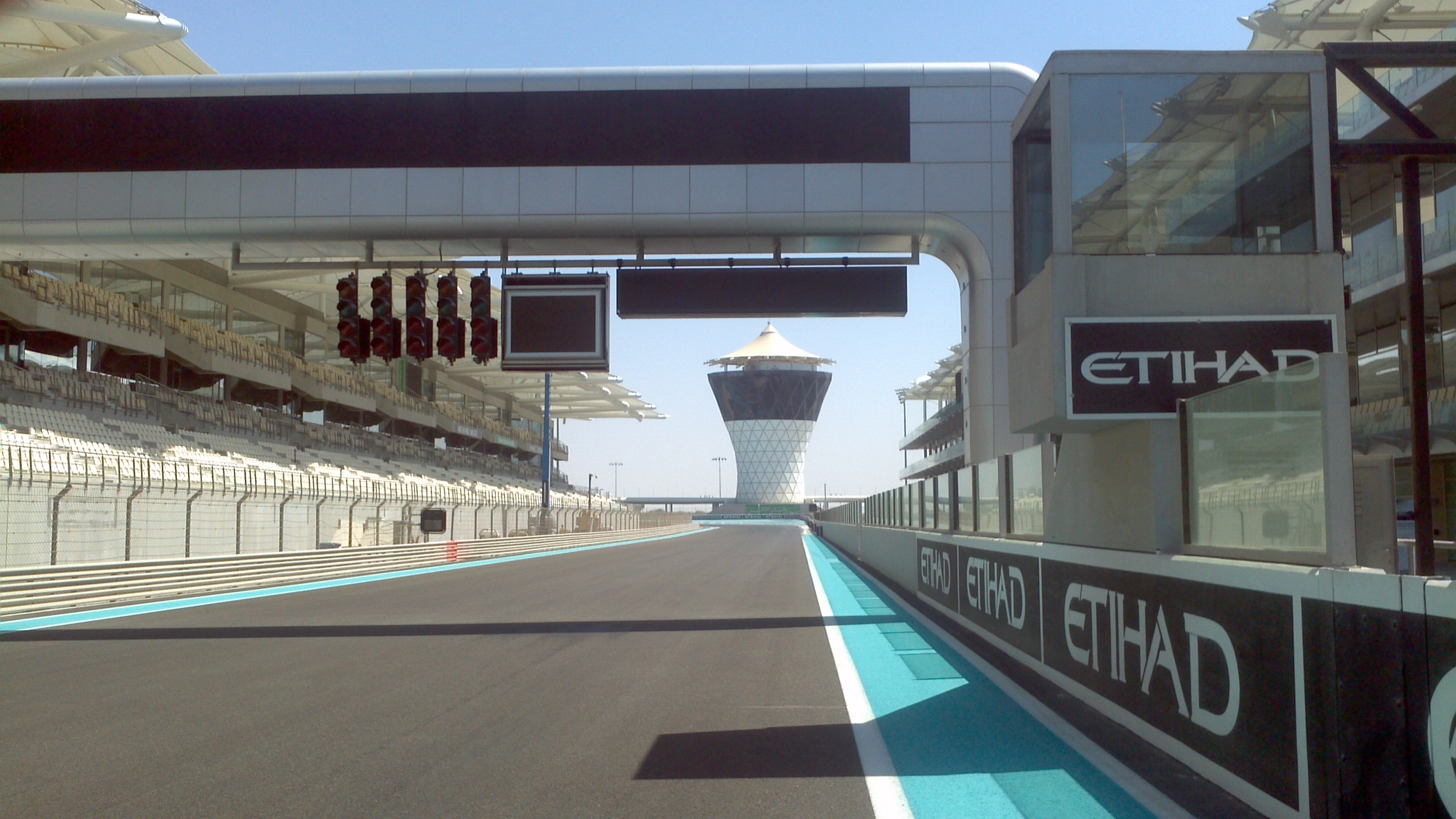
Yas Marina Circuit

=== Abu Dhabi Grand Slam ===
Abu Dhabi regularly hosts the International Judo Federation Abu Dhabi grand slam. Engendering some criticism, the International Judo Federation refused to allow the Israeli flag and the Israeli national anthem at the international games in 2017. Some referred to this action as anti-Semitic. The ban on Israeli symbols was lifted in 2018 and Israeli flag and the national anthem was allowed to be displayed. Israeli minister of sports Miri Regev was also allowed to attend the event.

=== Special Olympics World Games Abu Dhabi 2019 ===
In March 2019, Abu Dhabi hosted the first Special Olympics World Games in the Middle East. The event took place from 14 to 21 March 2019 and featured more than 7,500 athletes participating in 24 sporting disciplines. The official World Games Flame of Hope was lit in Athens and flown to Abu Dhabi, where it then embarked on the torch run, visiting all seven emirates of the UAE. It was the first time the Special Olympics World Games were hosted in the Middle East and North Africa region, with Abu Dhabi being the host city. More than 2,500 coaches and 20,000+ volunteers were available in the Olympics.

=== Other sporting events ===
The city has hosted multiple international cricket tournaments, such as the ICC Men's T20 World Cup, and tennis events such as the Mubadala World Tennis Championship.It has also hosted many UFC events.

== Sites and attractions ==
Abu Dhabi has many sites and attractions that include the Sheikh Zayed Grand Mosque, Mariam Umm Eisa Mosque, Emirates Palace, Qasr Al Watan, Yas Marina Circuit, The Corniche, Hayyatii Towers, Etihad Towers, Yas Marina, Yas Waterworld Abu Dhabi, Ferrari World Abu Dhabi, Louvre Abu Dhabi, Yas Island, Saadiyat Island, Warner Bros. World Abu Dhabi, SeaWorld Abu Dhabi and Jubail Mangrove Park.

On 29 April 2022, Abu Dhabi announced a 100% capacity for commercial activities, tourist attractions and events in the emirate.

The Walt Disney Company announced on 7 May 2025 that it plans to build its seventh worldwide theme park resort in Abu Dhabi on Yas Island.

== In popular culture ==
The American comic strip character Garfield the cat freqeuently tries to mail his archnemesis, Nermal the kitten, to Abu Dhabi as a running gag; he has done this 74 times.

== Sister cities ==
- Bethlehem, Palestine
- Brisbane, Australia
- Houston, United States
- Madrid, Spain
- Minsk, Belarus

== See also ==
- Abu Dhabi Fund for Development
- Abu Dhabi Investment Council
- Abu Dhabi Global Market
- Abu Dhabi Vegetable Market
- Abu Dhabi Mall
- Archaeology of the United Arab Emirates
- Department of Municipal Affairs (Abu Dhabi)
- Dubai-Abu Dhabi Highway
- Marawah
- National Center for Documentation and Research
- Postage stamps and postal history of Abu Dhabi
