= Abu Dhabi Vegetable Market =

Coordinates: 24.517281°N 54.379174°E

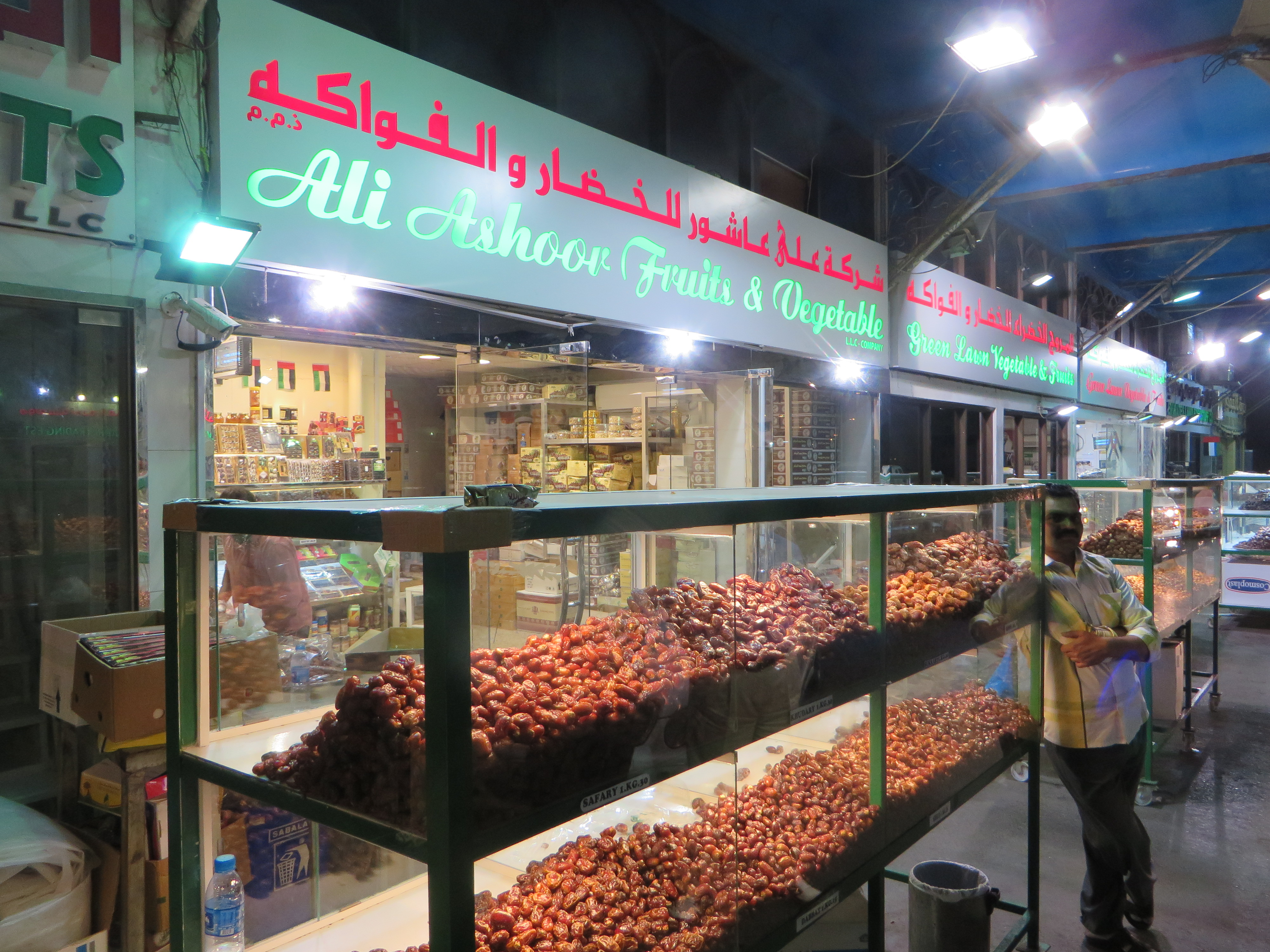
A date shop at the Abu Dhabi Vegetable Market.

The Abu Dhabi Vegetable Market (aka Al Mina Fruit & Vegetable Market or Souk) is the main vegetable market in central Abu Dhabi, United Arab Emirates.

As well as stalls selling fresh fruit and vegetables in general, the market also features a row of shops selling dates. The market is next to Zayed Port and the Fish Market is close by too.
