= Boggi =

Italian men's clothing retailer

Boggi Milano
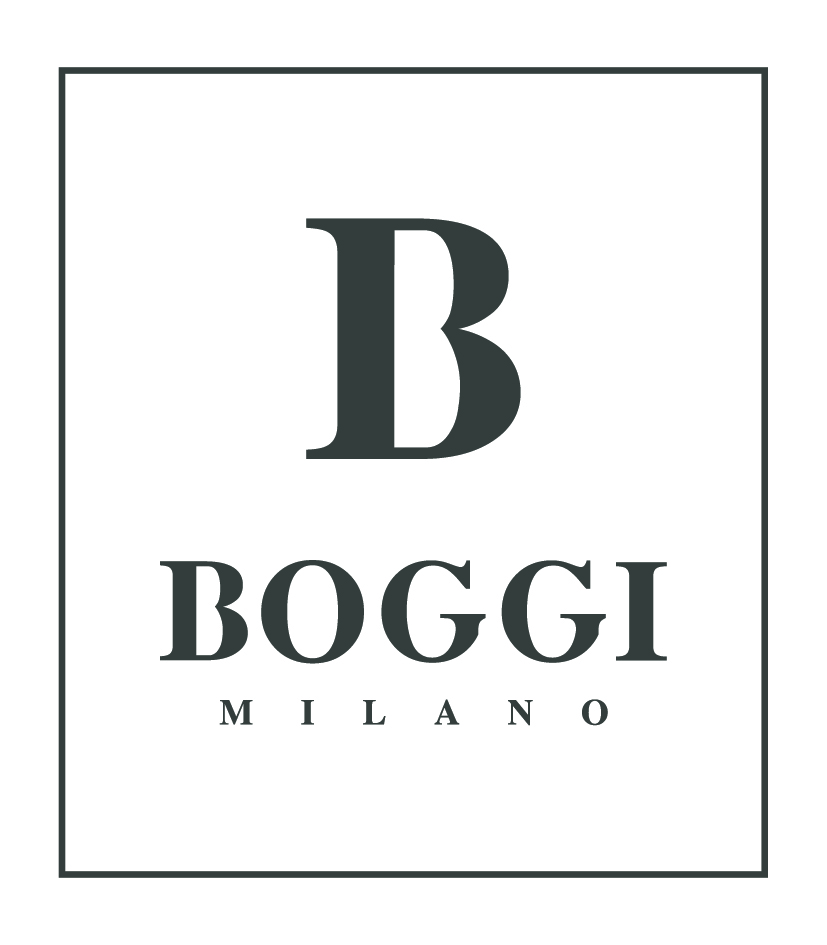
- Trade name: Boggi Milano
- Native name: Boggi Milano
- Type: Private
- Industry: Fashion retail
- Genre: Menswear
- Founded: 1939 in Monza, Italy
- Founder: Paolo Boggi
- Headquarters: Milan, Italy
- Number of locations: 285
- Area served: Worldwide
- Key people: Sandro De Bruno (President & CEO, The Brian & Barry Group); Carlo Zaccardi (CEO, †2025)
- Products: Menswear, accessories
- Parent: The Brian & Barry Group (acquired 2003)
- Website: www.boggi.com

Boggi is an Italian clothing brand founded in 1939 by Paolo Boggi. Based in Milan, the company is owned by the Brian & Barry Group, and has 290 stores in 67 countries. In addition to directly operated retail, the brand is also available at Kadewe, Selfridges, Bloomingdales, Nordiska Kompaniet, El Corte Ingles, and El Palacio de Hierro. E-commerce accounts for roughly 15% of revenue.

== History ==
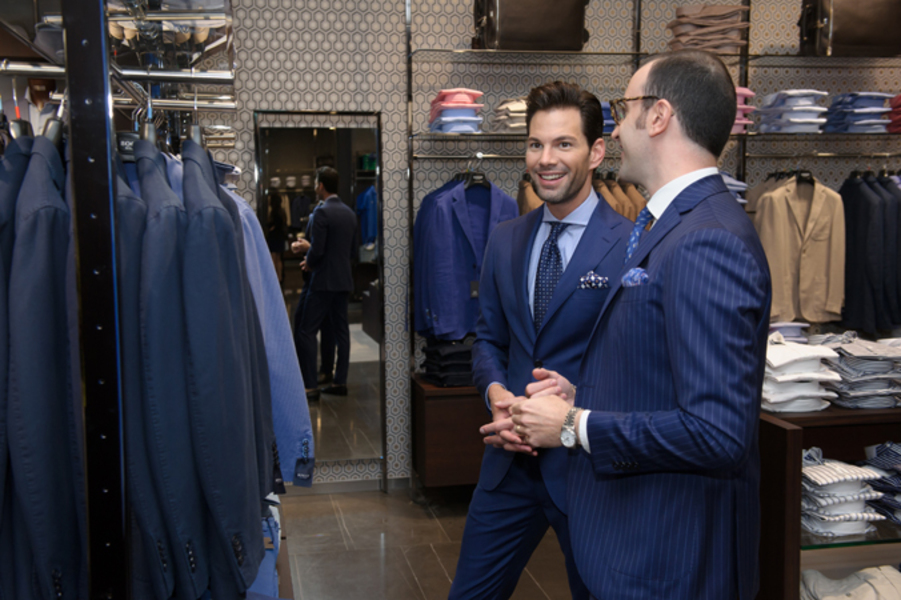
Inside a Boggi store

The brand was founded by Paolo Boggi with the opening of a small shop specializing in tailored suits in Monza. In 1964, after launching its first collection, the company expanded to Milan by opening a store in Galleria Passarella, a prestigious mixed-use complex located near Piazza San Babila and the Duomo. The location was renovated in 2019 to celebrate the brand's 80th anniversary.

In 1996, Boggi Milano opened a store in Geneva, Switzerland, its first store outside Italy.

In 2003, Boggi Milano was acquired for €13.2 million by the Brian & Barry Group, owned by brothers Carlo, Claudio and Roberto Zaccardi; Sandro De Bruno became President and CEO of the Brian & Barry Group.

From 2009, the brand began an expansion process, opening over 100 stores in Europe, Asia, the Middle East, Russia and South America. By 2011, Boggi had 100 stores worldwide. In 2016, the company established the Boggi Milano Academy, an internal training program aimed at developing new talent and keeping staff updated on the brand.

In 2019, the company announced plans to expand its operations with the goal of reaching revenue of €500 million. The plan included strengthening the e-commerce network and adopting an omnichannel retail strategy.

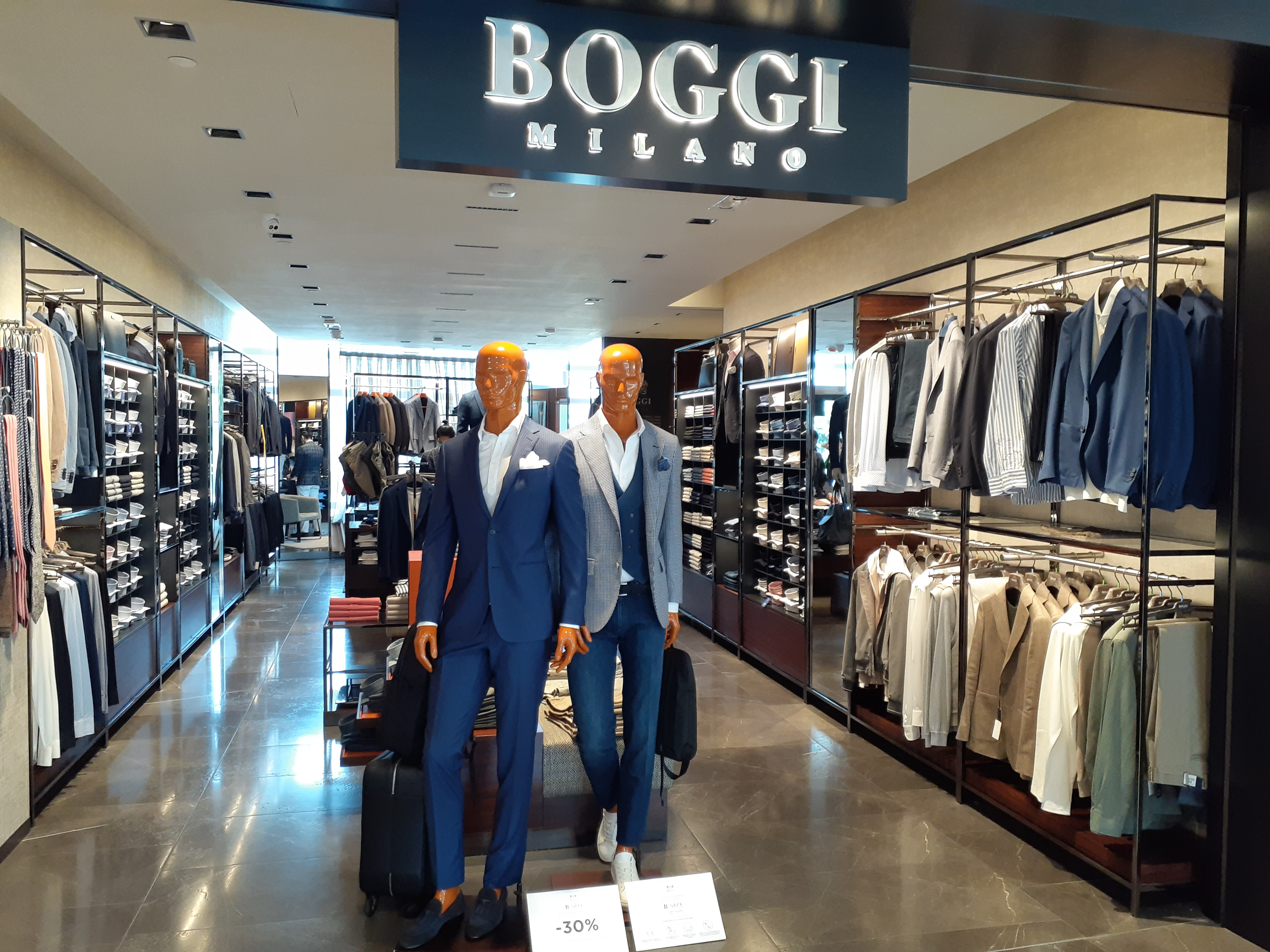
Boggi store in IFC Mall, Hong Kong

In 2024 the brand opened its Casa Boggi global headquarters in Milan. In 2025 the brand opened three directly operated stores in the US: Madison Avenue, Soho on Mercer Street, and The Shops at Columbus Circle. Its flagship U.S. store is a 8,810 sq-ft space at 527 Madison Avenue on the corner of 54th Street. Boggi opened shop-in-shop leased spaces inside Bloomingdales malls.

In 2025, Boggi Milano opened 140 stores across eight countries in two months. As of 2025, Boggi Milano has more than 240 stores in 63 countries worldwide, including several franchise locations. Boggi opened a new 10,000 m^{2} automated warehouse in Concorezzo, Monza.

Carlo Zaccardi, then-CEO of Boggi Milano, died at the age of 58 on February 19, 2025. Claudio Zaccardi became President and CEO of Boggi.

In 2025 Boggi became the official formalwear outfitter and licensee of the FIFA Men’s World Cup and the Women’s World Cup through 2027.

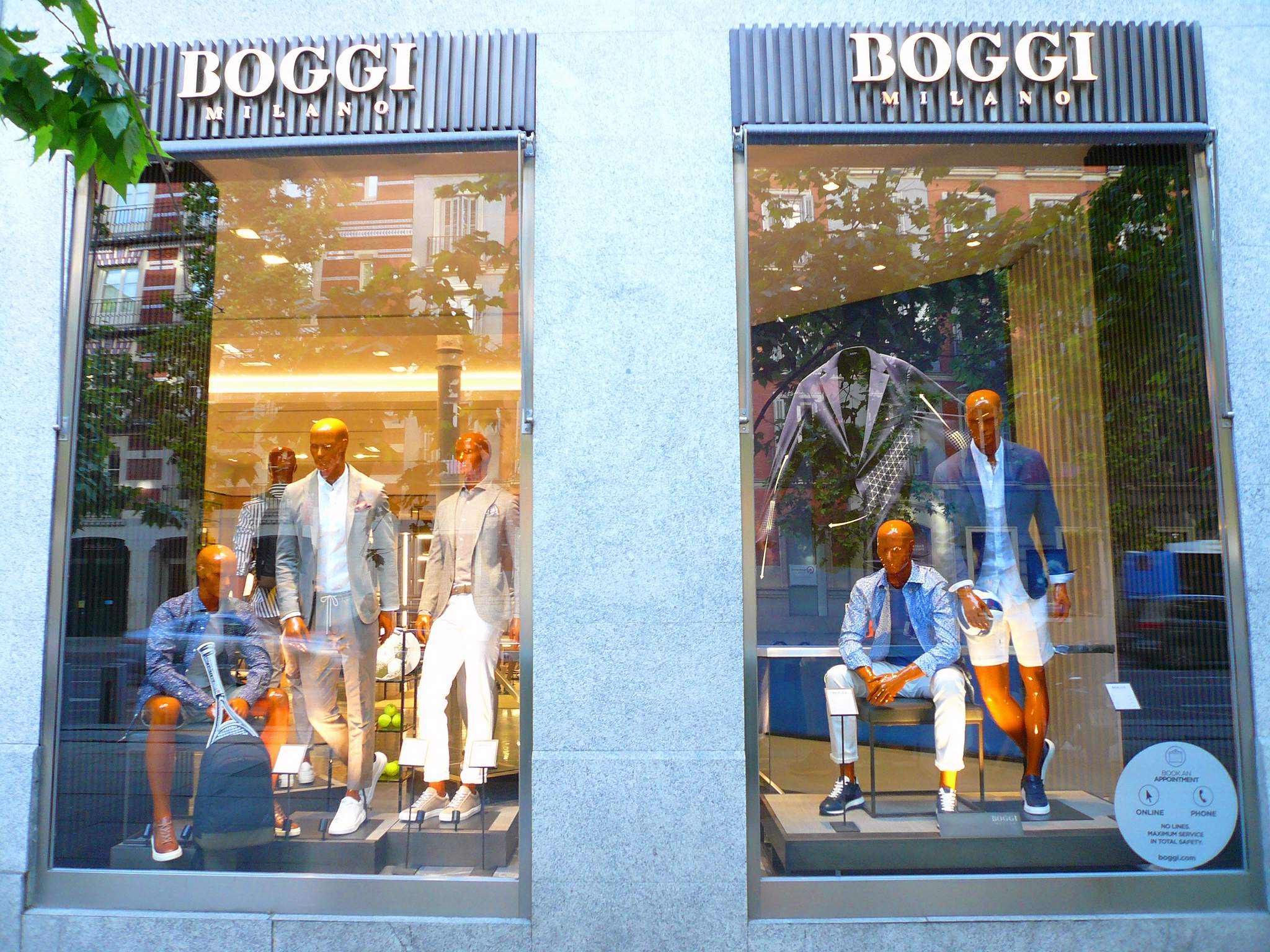
Boggi store in Madrid

Boggi generated revenue of €364 million in 2025. The company aims to reach €400 million in 2026.

In 2026 Boggi created a capsule collection of polo shirts and T-shirts commemorating the eight national teams that have won the FIFA World Cup: Brazil, Germany, Italy, Argentina, France, Uruguay, Spain and England.

In 2026 Boggi announced it is the official formalwear sponsor of AC Milan.

== Retail locations ==
=== Europe ===
- Albania: Tirana (Skanderbeg Square)
- Andorra: Andorra la Vella
- Austria: Salzburg, Parndorf, Wien (Steffl and Kärntner Straße)
- Belgium: Antwerp, Bruxelles, Maasmechelen
- Bulgaria: Sofia
- Croatia: Zagreb and Split
- Cyprus: Nicosia (Stasikratous Street) and Limassol
- Denmark: Copenhagen (Illum)
- France: Bordeaux, Cannes, Lille, Lyon, Nice, Marseille, Paris (Boulevard des Italiens, Boulevard Saint Germain, Rue Marbeuf), Miramas, Pont-Sainte-Marie, Saint-Tropez, Villefontaine
- Georgia: Tbilisi
- Germany: Berlin (KaDeWe and Kurfürstendamm), Düsseldorf (Königsallee), Frankfurt, Hamburg, Ingolstadt, Munich (Fünf Höfe and Munich Airport), Stuttgart (Breuninger)
- Greece: Athens (City Link, Golden Hall Mall, Stadiou Street and Kanari Street), Marousi, Thessaloniki (Tsimiski Street),
- Hungary: Budapest (Andrássy út)
- Italy
  - San Babila, B. Aires, Torino, Sanremo, P.ta Romana, Varese, Siena, Bergamo, C.so Vercelli, Monza, Brescia, Firenze, Trento, Padova, Bolzano, Udine, Roma Babuino, Venezia San Marco, Bologna, Verona, Roma Appia, Trieste, Treviso, Cola di Rienzo, Seregno, Alba, Genova, Novara, Bari, Catania, Venezia Mercerie, Torino Lagrange, Roma piazza Venezia, Bologna piazza Mercanzia, Palermo, Como, Milano Via Durini (Casa Boggi)
- Kosovo: Pristina
- Luxembourg
- Malta: Sliema
- Russia
- Spain: Barcelona Passeig de Gracia, Madrid (Calle Serrano, Las Rozas de Madrid), A Coruña, Las Palmas, Málaga, Bilbao, Palma, Santander, Sevilla, Valencia, Vigo, Zaragoza (El Corte Inglés)
- Serbia: Belgrade, Novi Sad
- Sweden: Sturegatan and NK Stockholm
- Switzerland: Zürich (Uraniastrasse), Geneva
- The Netherlands
- United Kingdom: Jermyn Street, Sloane Square, Westfield London

=== Asia ===
- Azerbaijan: Baku (Port Baku Mall)
- Hong Kong: Canton Road in Tsim Sha Tsui
- Indonesia: Beachwalk Shopping Center in Kuta, Bali
- Malaysia: Pavilion Kuala Lumpur, The Exchange TRX
- Philippines: Rustan's Makati Mall, Manila
- Singapore: Orchard Road Paragon and Takashimaya

=== Middle East ===
- Bahrain: Manama and Muharraq
- Egypt: Cairo (Cairo Festival City Mall)
- Jordan: Amman (Abdali Mall, City Mall, Taj Mall)
- Kuwait: Al Zahraa, Kuwait City (Avenues Mall), Salmiya (Marina Mall),
- Lebanon: Beirut (Beirut Souks)
- Qatar: Doha (Villaggio Mall, Lagoona Mall), Lusail (Place Vendôme Mall)
- Saudi Arabia: Riyadh (Al Nakheel Mall, Riyadh Park, Harvey Nichols, Al Faisaliah Mall)
- UAE: Dubai (Mall of the Emirates, Dubai Festival City Mall, Dubai Mall), Abu Dhabi (Abu Dhabi Mall, Reem Mall, Galleria Al Maryah Island, Dubai Hills Mall)

=== Americas ===
- Colombia: Bogotá, Cali, Medellin
- Mexico: Ciudad de México (Artz Pedregal, El Palacio de Hierro, Paseo Interlomas)
- Paraguay: Ciudad del Este (SAX Department Store)
- Peru: Lima (Santiago de Surco)
- Panama: Multiplaza Pacific
- USA: New York City (Madison Avenue, Mercer Street, Columbus Circle), Miami (Brickell City Centre)
