= Sowwah Square Tower 3 =

- Interactive map of the Sowwah Square Tower 3 area

General information
- Type: Commercial offices
- Location: Abu Dhabi; United Arab Emirates
- Coordinates: 24.500237°N 54.388372°E
- Construction started: 2008
- Completed: 2011
- Owner: Mubadala

Height
- Roof: 160 m (520 ft)

Technical details
- Floor count: 31

Design and construction
- Architect: Goettsch Partners

Sowwah Square Tower 3 is the name of a skyscraper on Sowwah island in Abu Dhabi, the capital of the United Arab Emirates.

The building is located in the district of Sowwah Square and opened in 2011. Sowwah Square Tower 3 is 160 meters (520 feet) tall with 31 floors.

== See also ==
- Sowwah Square Tower 1
- Sowwah Square Tower 2
- List of tallest buildings in Abu Dhabi
