= Brian & Barry =

Italian department store chain

- Company type: Private company
- Industry: Retail
- Founded: 1985; 41 years ago
- Headquarters: Milan, Italy
- Key people: Sandro De Bruno
- Products: Clothing, footwear, jewelry, beauty products, design products and food.
- Owner: Carlo Zaccardi died on 20/02/2025; Claudio Zaccardi; Roberto Zaccardi
- Website: brianebarry.it

Brian & Barry is an Italian department store chain and business group. Its global flagship store and corporate headquarters are in central Milan near Piazza San Babila. It carries high-end labels and Brian & Barry private label merchandise.

== History ==
In 1924, Pietro Zaccardi and his wife Maria opened a boutique in Monza. Ermanno Zaccardi, Piero's son, became a manager and in 70s created the Happening group. In 1985, the family opened the first Brian & Barry store. In 2003, Ermanno's sons Carlo, Claudio and Roberto Zaccardi bought the Boggi brand for €13.2 million. In 2010s the group has bought a 12-storey historical palace in central Milan, designed by Italian architect Giovanni Muzio, with an investment of €70 million. In March 2014, the flagship store Brian & Barry Building – San Babila was opened.

== Flagship and regional stores ==
Alba

- Brian & Barry Alba, 15 Via Vittorio Emanuele

Milan

- The Brian & Barry Building – San Babila, 28 Via Durini (70,000 square feet – opened 2014) – which include an Eataly corner
- Brian & Barry Milano Vercelli, 23 Corso Vercelli

Monza

- Brian & Barry Monza Donna, 36 Via Italia
- Brian & Barry Monza Uomo, 38 Via Italia

Seregno

- Brian & Barry Seregno, 74 Corso del Popolo

Varese

- Brian & Barry Varese, 4 Piazza Montegrappa

== See also ==
- Golden Quadrangle Fashion District
- La Rinascente
- Coin
