= Al Sila Tower =

Abu Dhabi Global Market Square Tower 1 (Al Sila Tower)
- Interactive map of the Abu Dhabi Global Market Square Tower 1 (Al Sila Tower) area

General information
- Type: Commercial offices
- Location: Abu Dhabi; United Arab Emirates
- Coordinates: 24.500237°N 54.388372°E
- Construction started: 2008
- Completed: 2012
- Owner: Mubadala

Height
- Architectural: 131 m (430 ft)
- Tip: 131 m (430 ft)
- Top floor: 121 m (397 ft)

Technical details
- Floor count: 31
- Floor area: 40,400 m^{2} (435,000 sq ft)

Design and construction
- Architect: Goettsch Partners

Abu Dhabi Global Market Square Tower 1 (Al Sila Tower), formerly Sowwah Square Tower 1, is the name of a skyscraper on Al Maryah Island in Abu Dhabi, the capital of the United Arab Emirates.

The building is located in the district of the Abu Dhabi Global Market Square and opened in October 2012. Al Sila Tower is 131 feet (40 metres) tall with 31 floors.

The tower holds 40,400 square metres (435,000 square feet) of office space which has been rented out to companies such as Gulf Capital, Abu Dhabi Finance, Booze and Company and others.

== See also ==
- Sowwah Square Tower 2
- Sowwah Square Tower 3
- Sowwah Square Tower 4
- List of tallest buildings in Abu Dhabi
