= List of shopping malls in Abu Dhabi =

This is a list of shopping malls located in Abu Dhabi, United Arab Emirates.

| Mall | Location | Area | # of Stores | Refs. | Images |
|---|---|---|---|---|---|
| Abu Dhabi Mall | Abu Dhabi, near Reem Island | | 200+ | | |
| Al Mariah Mall | Downtown Abu Dhabi | | 20 | | |
| Al Maqtaa Mall | Rabdan, Bawabat Abu Dhabi | | 20 | | |
| Al Raha Mall | Sheikh Zayed Bin Sultan St, Al Raha | | 100 | | |
| Al Wahda Mall | Hazza Bin Zayed St | | 350+ | | |
| Bawabat Al Sharq Mall | Baniyas East, Bawabat Al Sharq St | | | | |
| Capital Mall | Mohammed Bin Zayed City, Musaffah | | | | |
| City Center Masdar | Masdar City | | | | |
| Dalma Mall | ICAD I, Musaffah | | | | |
| Deerfields Mall | Sheikh Zayed Bin Sultan St, Al Bahyah | | | | |
| Forsan Central Mall | Khalifa City | | | | |
| Galleria at Al Maryah Island (Al Maryah Central) | Al Maryah Island | | | | |
| Khalidiyah Mall | Al Khalidiyah | | 160 | | |
| Madinat Zayed Shopping Center | Sultan Bin Zayed The First St | | | | |
| Marina Mall | Al Marina | | 400+ | | |
| Mazyad Mall | Musaffah | | | | |
| Mushrif Mall | Sheikh Rashid Bin Saeed St | | | | |
| Nation Towers Mall | Al Bateen, Nation Towers | | | | |
| Paragon Bay Mall | Al Reem Island | | | | |
| Reem Mall | Al Reem Island | | | | |
| Shams Boutik Mall | Al Reem Island, Shams Boutik | | | | |
| The Galleria | Al Mariah Island | | 130+ | | |
| The Mall, WTCAD | WTCAD, Sheikh Rashid Bin Saeed St | | | | |
| Yas Mall | Yas Island | | 400+ | | |
