= Sowwah Square Tower 2 =

- Interactive map of the Sowwah Square Tower 2 area

General information
- Type: Commercial offices
- Location: Abu Dhabi; United Arab Emirates
- Coordinates: 24.500237°N 54.388372°E
- Construction started: 2008
- Completed: 2011
- Owner: Mubadala

Height
- Roof: 184 m (604 ft)

Technical details
- Floor count: 37

Design and construction
- Architect: Goettsch Partners

Sowwah Square Tower 2 is a skyscraper on Sowwah island in Abu Dhabi, the capital of the United Arab Emirates.

The building is located in the district of Sowwah Square and opened in 2012 (it was supposed to be opened in 2011). Sowwah Square Tower 2 is 184 meters (604 feet) tall with 37 floors.

== See also ==
- Sowwah Square Tower 1
- Sowwah Square Tower 3
