= Al Zahiyah =

Area in central Abu Dhabi, UAE

Coordinates: 24.50067°N 54.37827°E

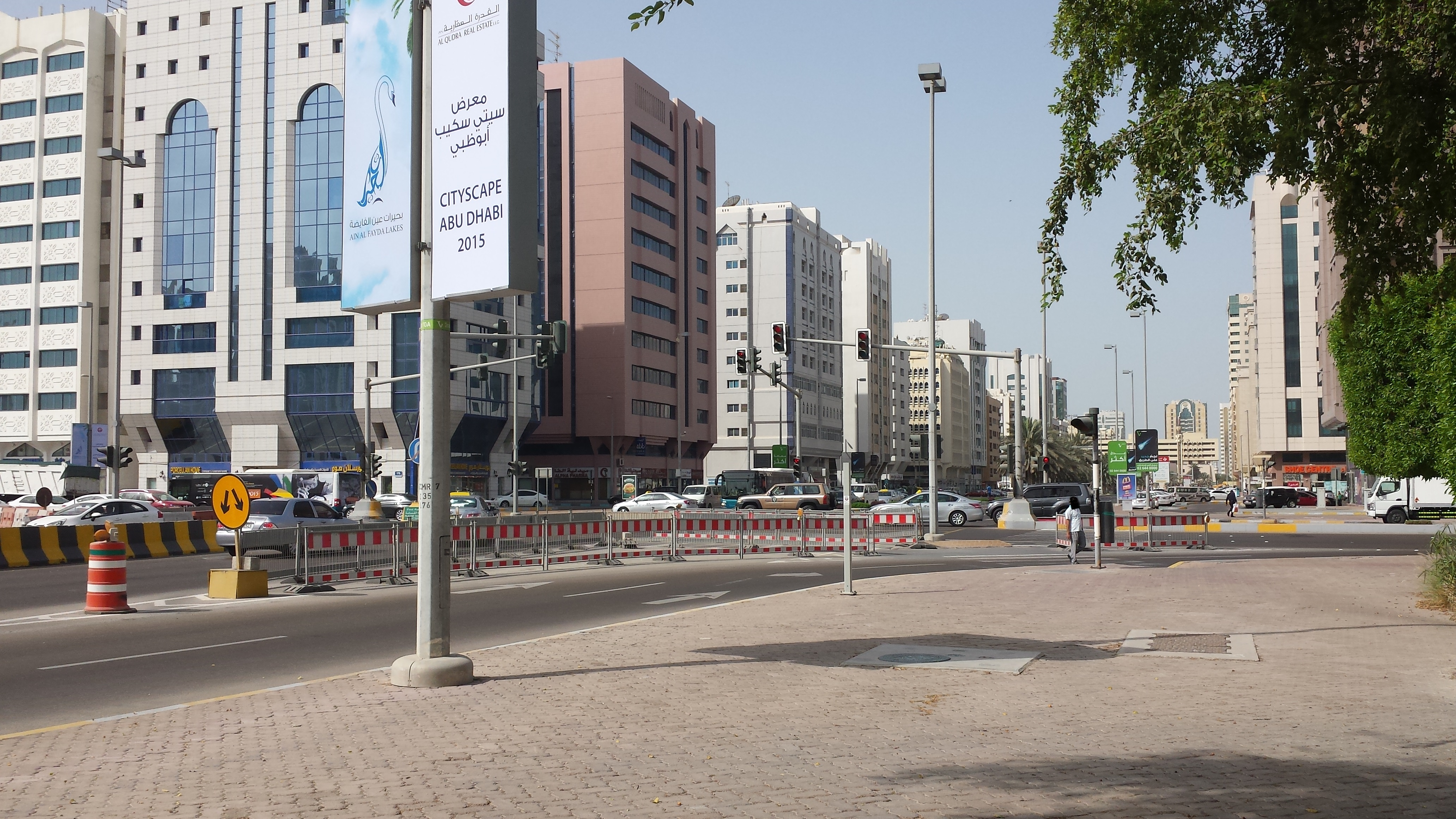
Street view in the Al Zahiayah area of Abu Dhabi

Al Zahiyah, formerly known as the Tourist Club Area, is an area in central Abu Dhabi, United Arab Emirates.

Al Zahiyah is an entertainment location, with restaurants, hotels (including the Beach Rotana), bars, and nightlife. The Abu Dhabi Mall is also located here. Five bridges connect the area of Al Maryah Island, a business district. The area became known as the "Tourist Club Area" in the 1970s.

A major 258-million AED infrastructure project of new roads, bridges, etc., was completed in 2019.
