= Beach Rotana =

Hotel in Abu Dhabi, United Arab Emirates

Coordinates: 24.4951°N 54.3840°E

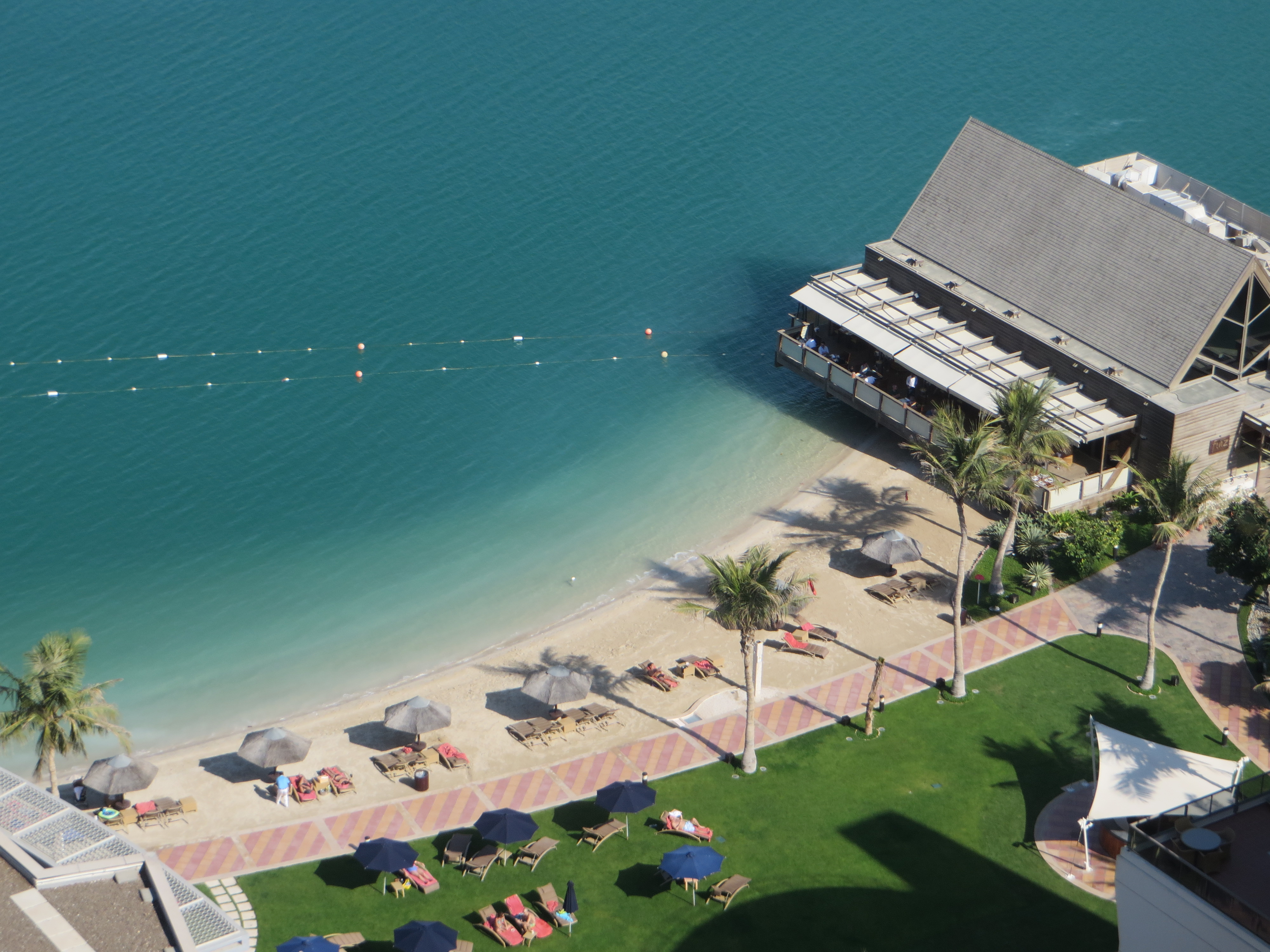
View of the beach at the Beach Rotana hotel, Abu Dhabi

The Beach Rotana is a grand resort in Abu Dhabi, United Arab Emirates.

The hotel is one of the oldest hotels in Abu Dhabi. It a member of The Leading Hotels of the World and part of Rotana Hotels. It is a hotel complex made up of two wings in Abu Dhabi's tourist club area, Al Zahiyah. The Beach Wing which stands with seven floors includes 286 rooms and suites whilst the Tower wing is 20 floors high and includes 128 rooms and suites. The Beach wing was opened in 1993 and the Tower wing in 2002. The hotel was established as the Beach Hotel by Nasser Al Nowais and Selim El Zyr, with backing by the hotel owner, Sheikh Suroor bin Mohammed.

The hotel houses twelve restaurants and bars, Zen the spa at Rotana and the Beach Club with a 120-metre beach, two swimming pools, and a gymnasium.

The Beach Rotana is next to Abu Dhabi Mall and is directly linked by an internal entrance. Opposite on Al Maryah Island is the Cleveland Clinic Abu Dhabi hospital building, dominating the view.

== Information ==
	Beach Wing	Hotel Tower	Apartments
Year constructed	1990	1999	1999
Opening date	September 1993	September 2002	September 2002
Guest room floors	2nd – 7th floor	8th – 20th floor	8th – 21st floor
Height	24 metres	71 metres	74 metres

Companies involved in construction

- Hotel Tower, Apartments and Beach Club:
  - Consult Limited / Arabian Construction Company / Ghazi Awad/MAPCO
- Beach Wing:
  - Arabian Construction Company / Al Zubair
