= Casa Barelli =

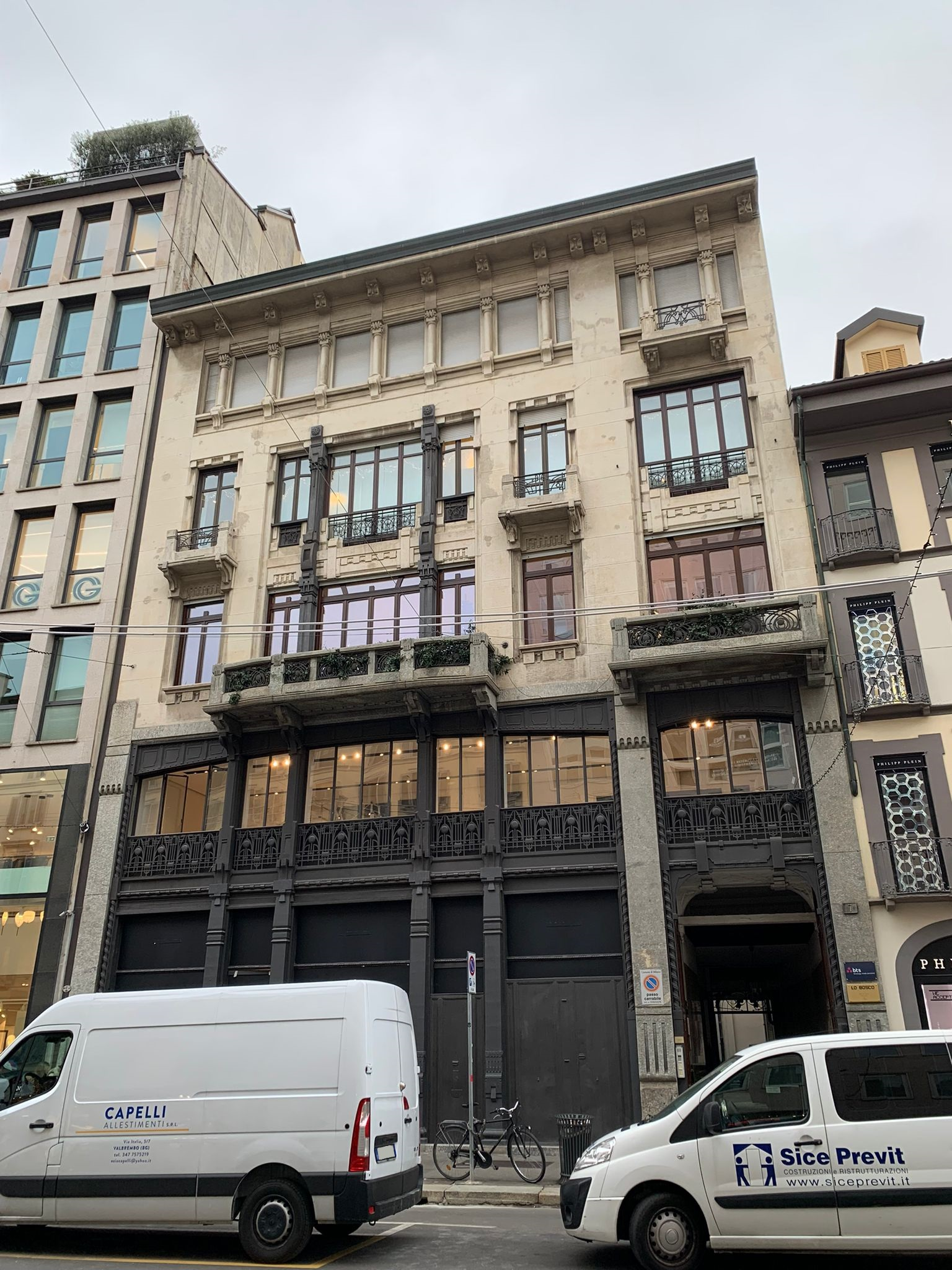
- Casa Barelli in 2021
- Click on the map for a fullscreen view

General information
- Location: Milan, Italy
- Coordinates: 45°28′04.05″N 9°11′53.21″E

Casa Barelli is a historic building located in Milan, Italy.

== History ==
The building, designed by architect Cesare Mazzocchi, was erected in 1907.

In 2023, Italian tennis player Jannik Sinner purchased some units within the building.

== Description ==
Located at Corso Venezia 7, just a short distance from Piazza San Babila, the building rises over five floors. The façade is marked by pronounced asymmetry and elegant Art Nouveau decorations, distinguished by iron-work elements. This material dominates the first two levels, creating a clear horizontal emphasis, and also features in the window-pillars of the second and third floors, as well as in the balustrades of the balconies.
