= World Alliance of International Financial Centers =

- Abbreviation: WAIFC
- Formation: October 1, 2018; 7 years ago
- Type: Trade association
- Legal status: Active
- Purpose: Facilitate cooperation between leading international financial centers
- Headquarters: City of Brussels, Belgium
- Services: Finances
- Members: 20 (plus 8 observers)
- Official language: English
- President: Jennifer Reynolds
- Managing Director: Jochen Biedermann
- Treasurer: Frederic de Laminne
- Website: waifc.finance

The World Alliance of International Financial Centers (WAIFC) is a non-profit financial association based in Brussels, Belgium. Created in Paris in 2018, its goal is to facilitate mutual cooperation by representing the world's major financial centers.

== History ==
In 2016 the financial centres of Paris, Frankfurt and Moscow proposed the creation of a non-profit association to facilitate cooperation and promote good practice and exchange with international public authorities. Two years later the association was founded as the World Alliance of International Financial Centres in Paris and was registered on October 1, 2018 in the city of Brussels by eleven financial centres from countries such as Germany, France, Belgium, Russia, Canada and the United Arab Emirates.

According to the newspapers Luxemburger Wort and L'Echo, the alliance was created "in order to strengthen collaboration between the centres leading to the development of a dialogue with public authorities based on financial technologies and sustainable development". Arnaud de Bresson, executive director of the Paris Europlace organization, was elected as the first president, while Jochen Biedermann and Frederic de Laminne became managing director and treasurer respectively. In January 2021, Jennifer Reynolds, President & CEO of Toronto Finance International, was elected as the first Chairwoman of the Alliance. The initial eleven members were joined by centers from other territories such as Japan, Hong Kong, Mauritius, Qatar and the United Kingdom to form an 20-member alliance today.

In view of the contingency generated by the COVID-19 pandemic in 2020, the association expressed in a publication the need to "reconsider economic models and give a new priority to long-term prospects and sustainable economy". Board member Hubertus Väth cited the financial centers of Tokyo and Hong Kong as examples for "successfully dealing with similar challenges in the past," referring to the 2002–2004 SARS outbreak. The text also called for concentrated efforts to develop technologies such as blockchain, artificial intelligence and cloud computing to address contingency challenges.

== Overall focus ==
WAIFC was created to bringing international financial centres under one organization to facilitate mutual cooperation, encourage the exchange of best practices, stimulate financial research and undertake projects that contribute to sustainable economic development. Currently the organization is in charge of conducting research projects with universities and private consulting companies, focusing on areas of action such as the development of financial technologies or fintech, data collection from financial centers and their contribution to green investment.

== Members ==
The following organisations are or were full members of WAIFC:

- Abu Dhabi Global Market (ADGM)
- Astana International Financial Centre (AIFC)
- Belgian Finance Center (BFC)
- Busan Finance Center (BFC)
- Casablanca Finance City (CFC)
- FinCity.Tokyo
- Frankfurt Main Finance (FMF)
- Hong Kong Financial Services Development Council (FSDC)
- Luxembourg for Finance (LFF)
- Moscow Internacional Financial Center (MIFC) (Membership suspended in March 2022)
- Paris Europlace
- Stuttgart Financial (From 15 May 2020)
- The Capital Market Authority of Oman (CMA)
- The Economic Development Board Mauritius (EDB)
- The Qatar Financial Center (QFC)
- TheCityUK
- Toronto Finance International (TFI)
- Rwanda Finance
- Dubai International Financial Centre (DIFC)
- Stichting Capital Amsterdam (SCA)

=== Observers ===
The following were observers at WAIFC as of April 2024:

- City of Boston
- Connecticut Hedge Fund Association
- Eastern economic Corridor (EEC) Office (Bangcock)
- Greater New York Chamber of Commerce
- Lujiazui Financial City (Shanghai)
- Strategic Reforms Agency Uzbekistan
- Two Rivers International Finance and Innovation Centre
- World Business Chicago
