= Piazza San Babila =

Square in Milan, Italy

- City square
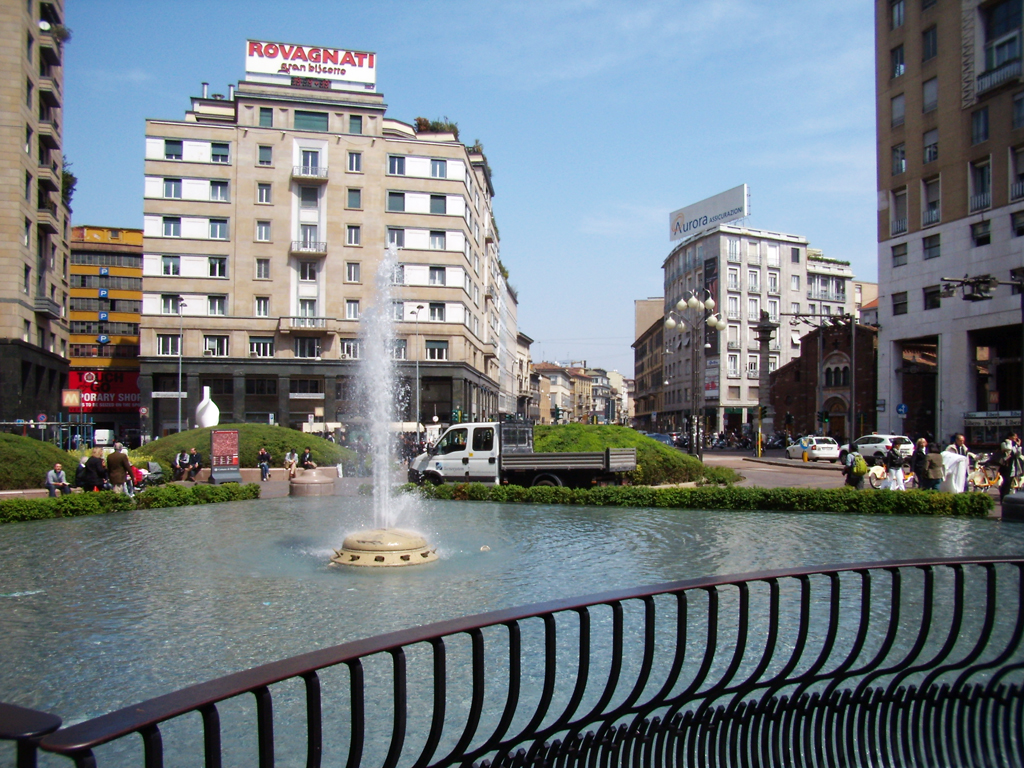
- Piazza San Babila in 2010
- Location: Milan, Italy
- Interactive map of Piazza San Babila
- Coordinates: 45.4667°N 9.1976°E

Piazza San Babila is a city square in Milan, Italy.

The square had always existed as a "largo" since Roman times, as the road to Bergamo would cross the walls of the Roman city. In medieval times as the city expanded beyond its Roman walls the homonymous basilica was founded, and the largo became an important crossroad in the city's intricated road network. Corsia dei Servi (now Corso Vittorio Emanuele II), corsia di san Damiano (now Corso Monforte), corso di Porta Orientale (now Corso Venezia), Contrada del Durino (now via Durini), Contrada del monte (now Corso di Montenapoleone) all used to cross here.

Subsequently, from 1931 to 1948 the largo was widened and officially became a "Piazza", the old buildings were demolished and new ones were built in their place, including the Snia Viscosa Tower, Milan's first skyscraper. The only building that survived the radical renovation of the largo was the basilica, which still stands today. New streets were opened such as Corso Matteotti in 1927 and Corso Europa in the 1960s. Nowadays the streets meeting in San Babila and the contiguous Largo Arturo Toscanini are, anticlockwise from the bottom, Corso Europa, via Durini, via Borgogna, Corso Monforte, Corso Venezia, via Bagutta, Corso Matteotti and finally Corso Vittorio Emanuele II.

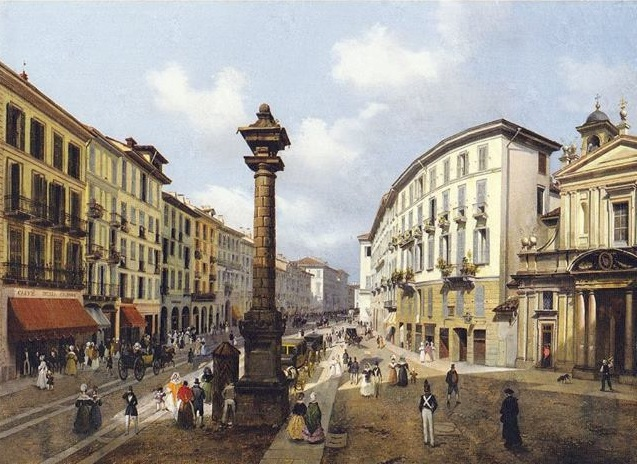
Corso Venezia of Piazza San Babila

== Gallery ==
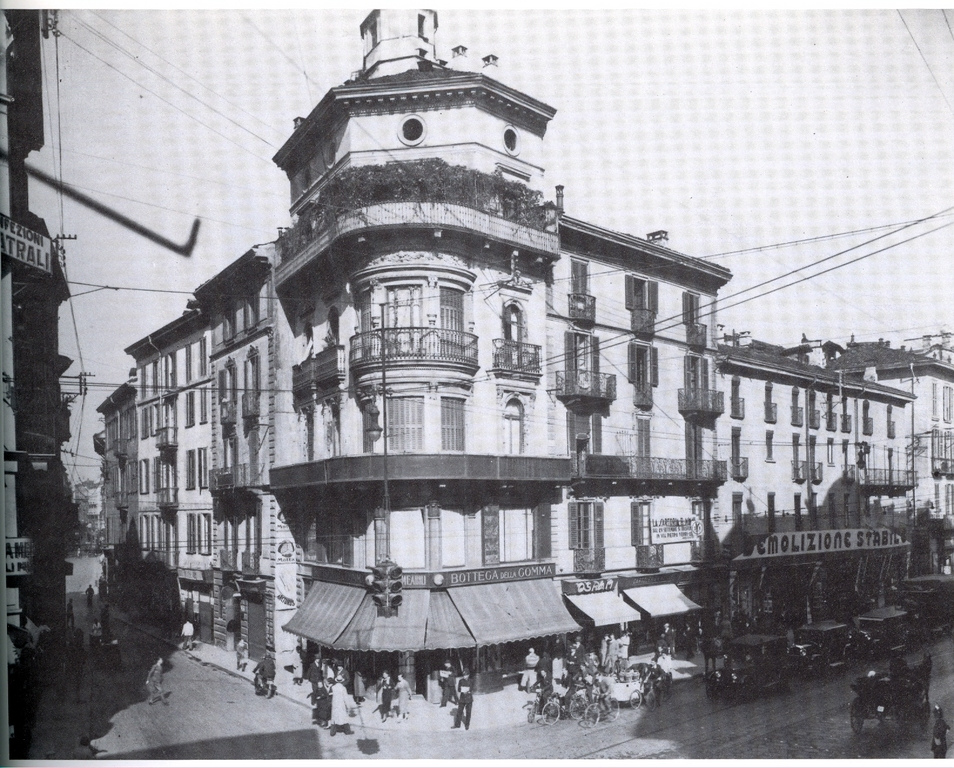
Monte Napoleone

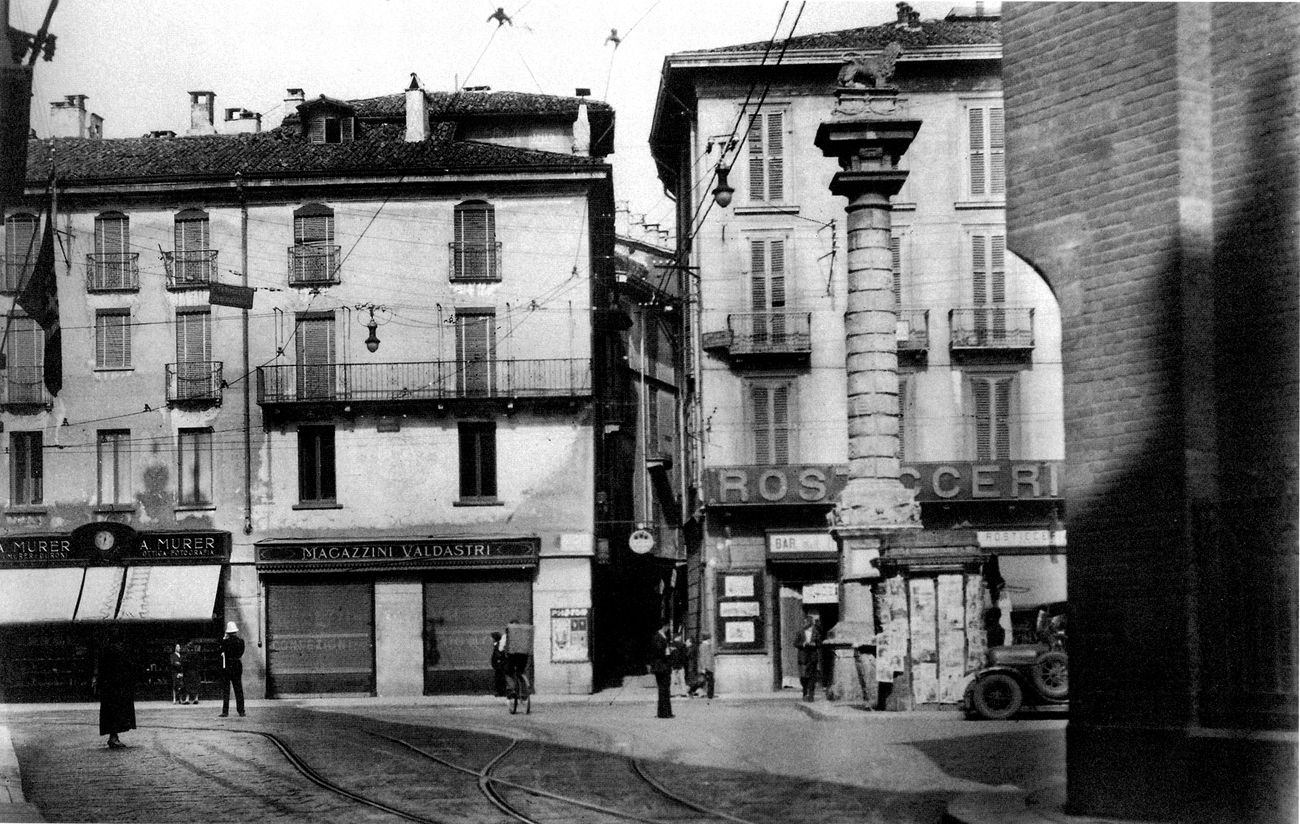
corso Monforte

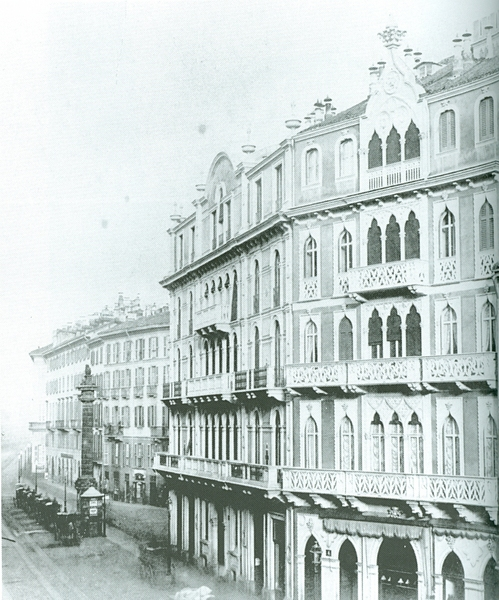
Gli edifici in stile neogotico veneziano

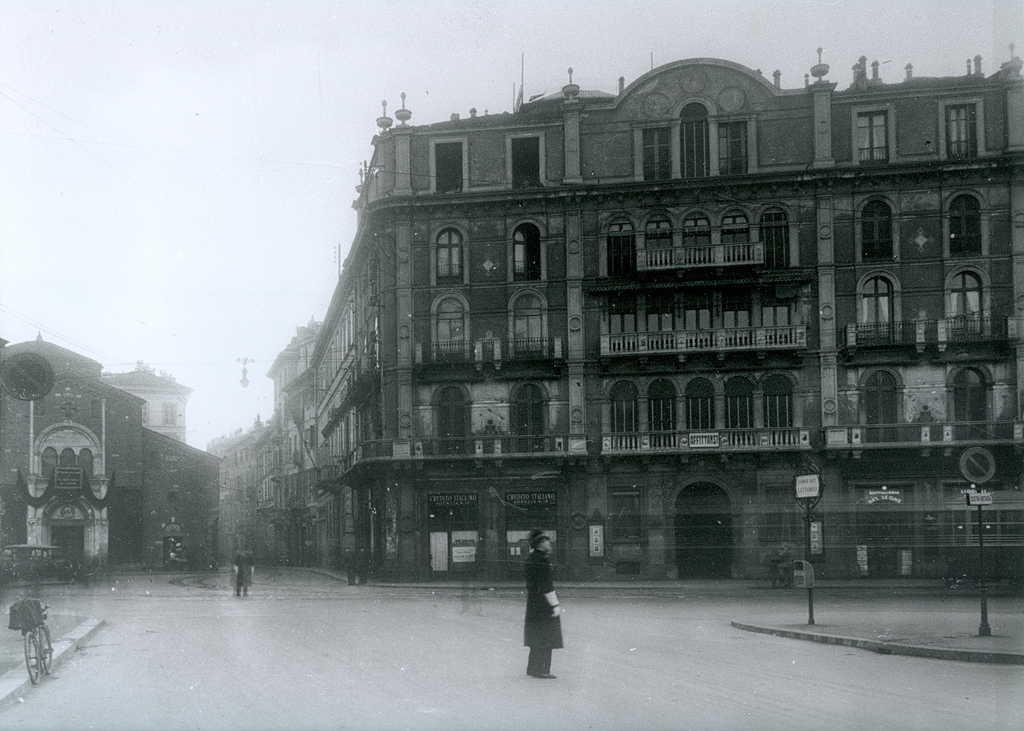
One of the two buildings in the Venetian Neo-Gothic style

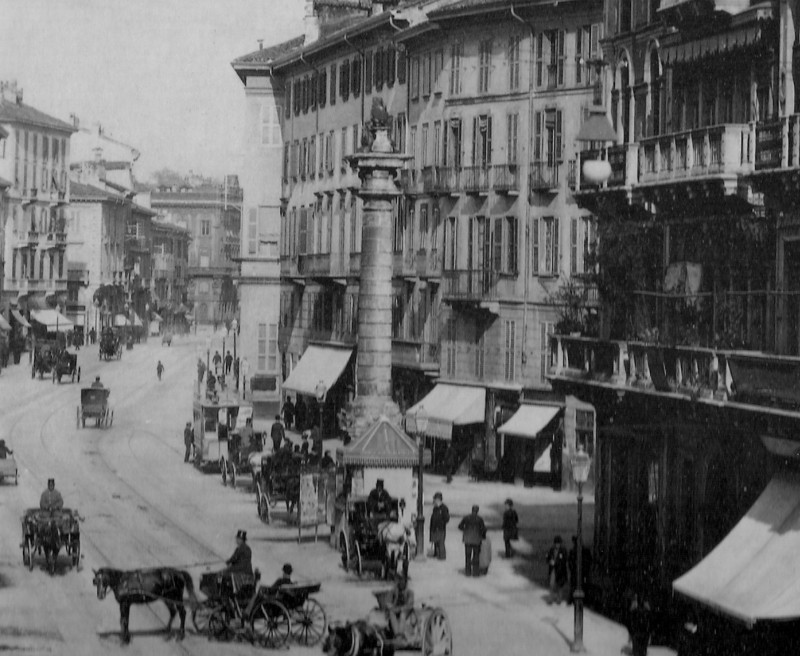
Largo San Babila and Corso Venezia in 1890

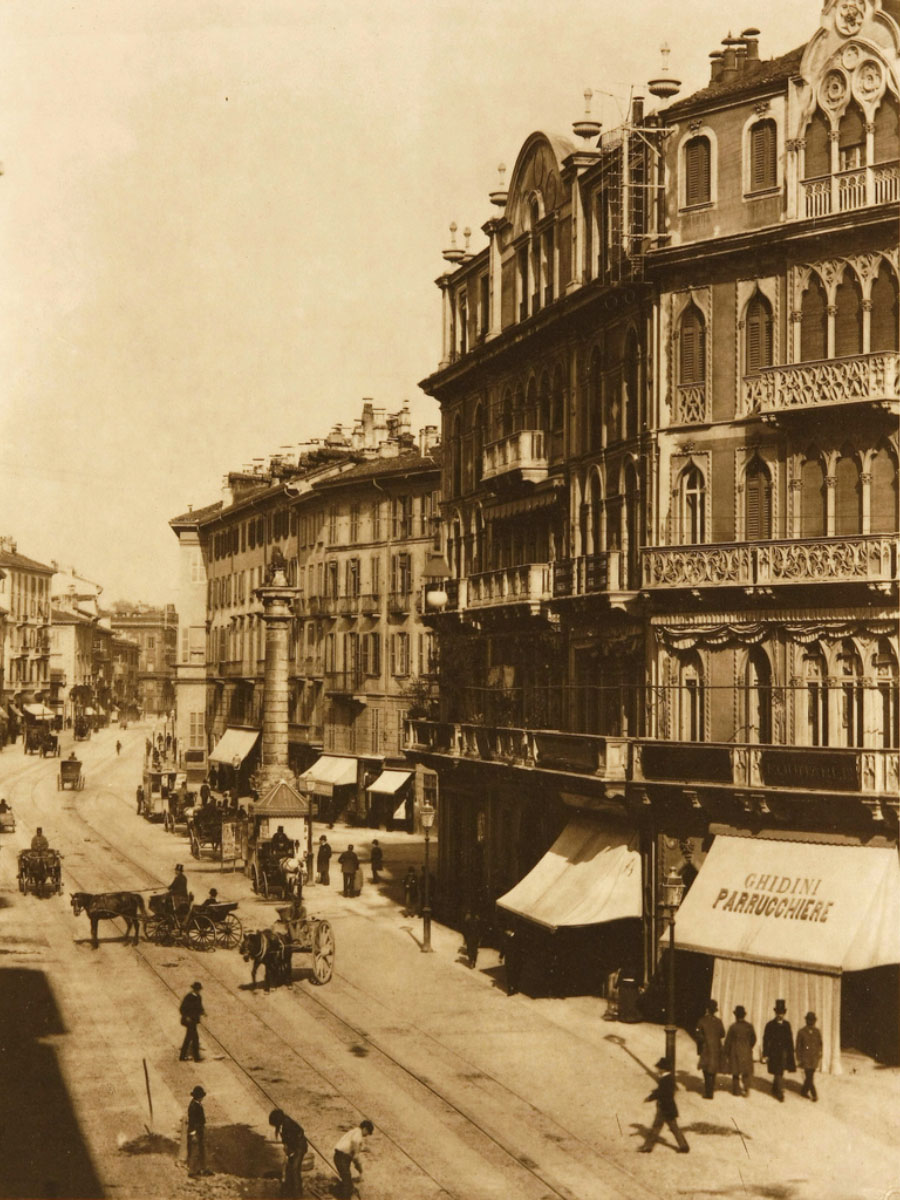
Largo San Babila

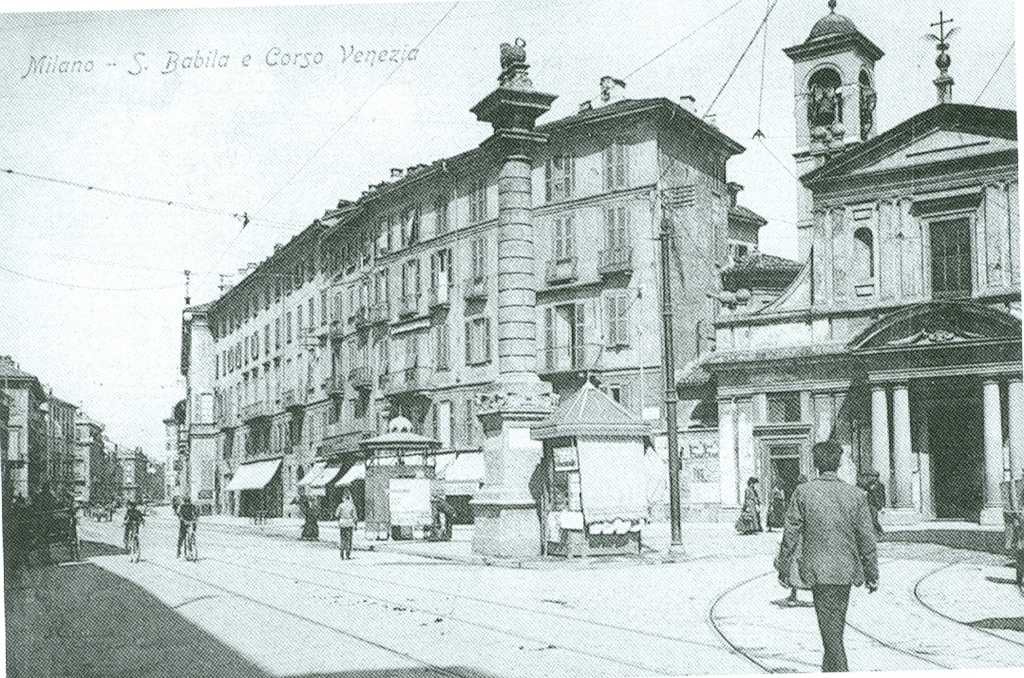
Largo San Babila at the end of the 19th century

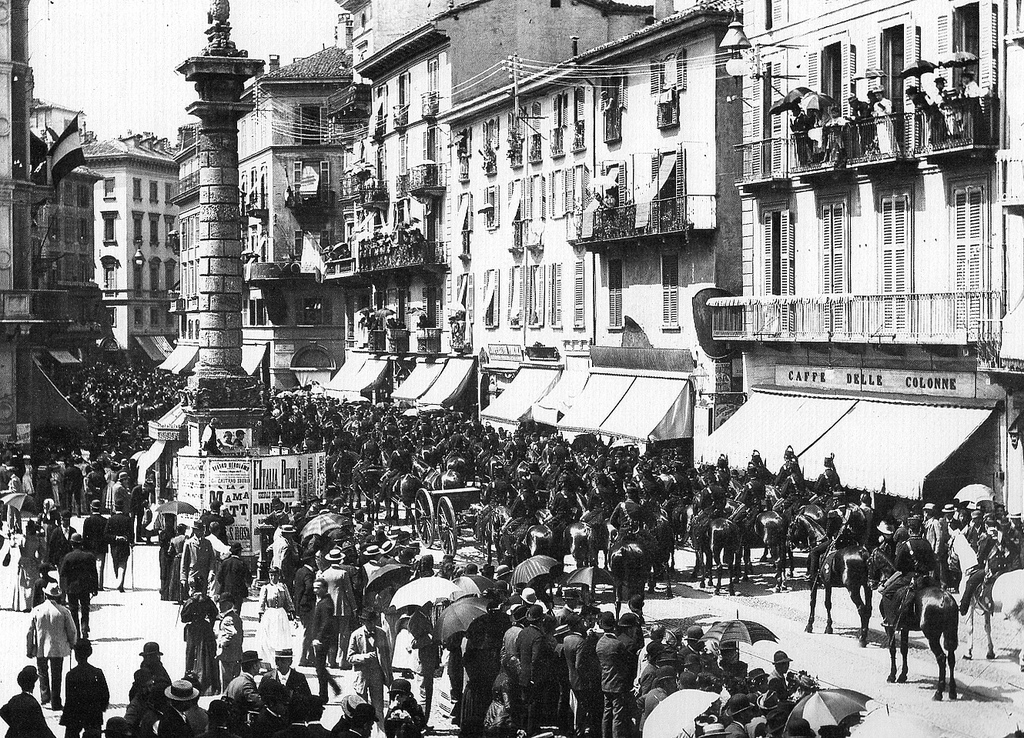
Largo San Babila during the 1898 Milan riots

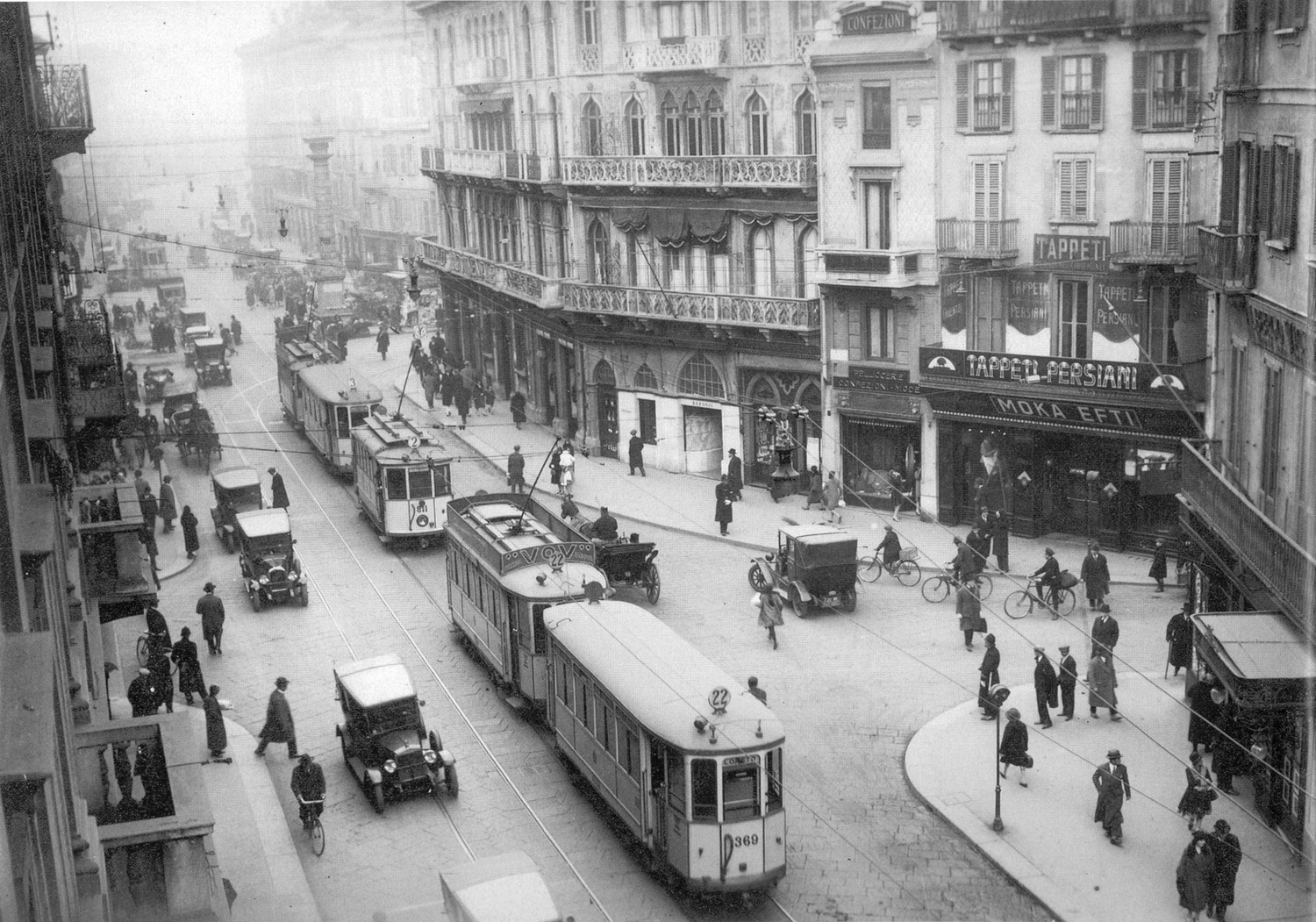
Largo San Babila in 1926

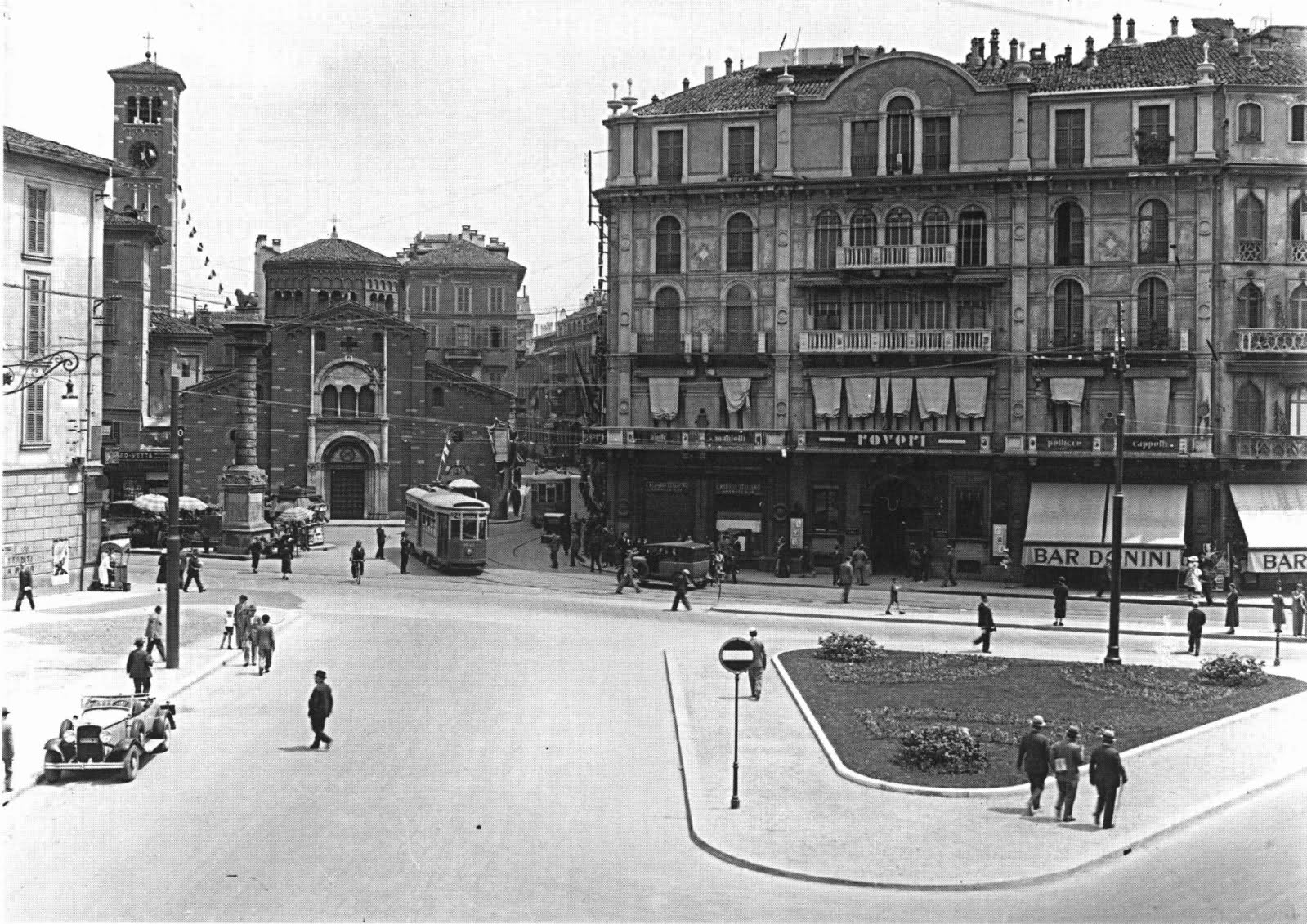
Largo San Babila in the 1930s

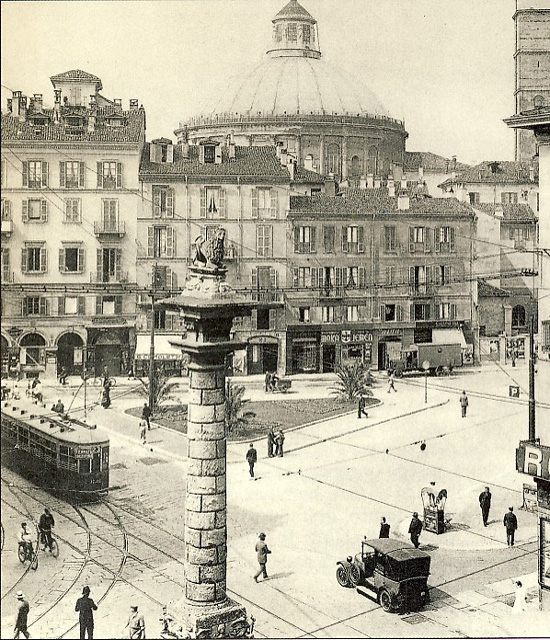
Largo San Babila in the 1930s

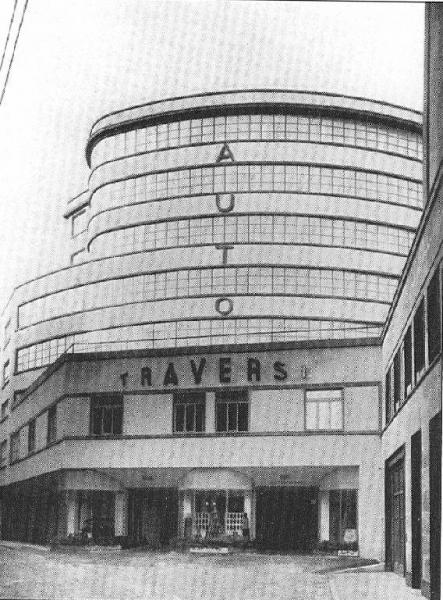
The Garage Traversi, built in 1938

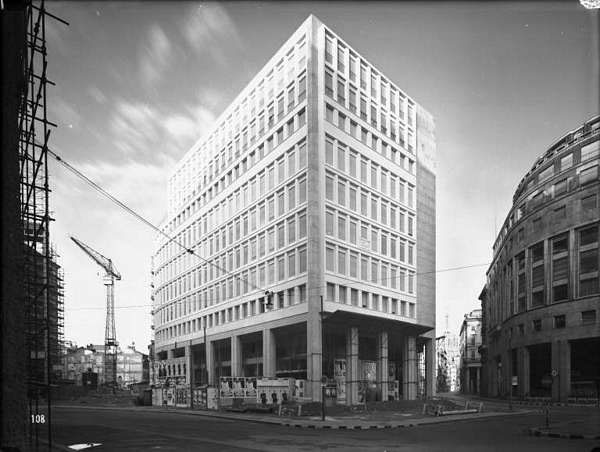
The corner building at Corso Vittorio Emanuele
