= Al Maryah Central =

Shopping center in Abu Dhabi, United Arab Emirates

Coordinates: 24°30′4.0″N 54°23′26.8″E

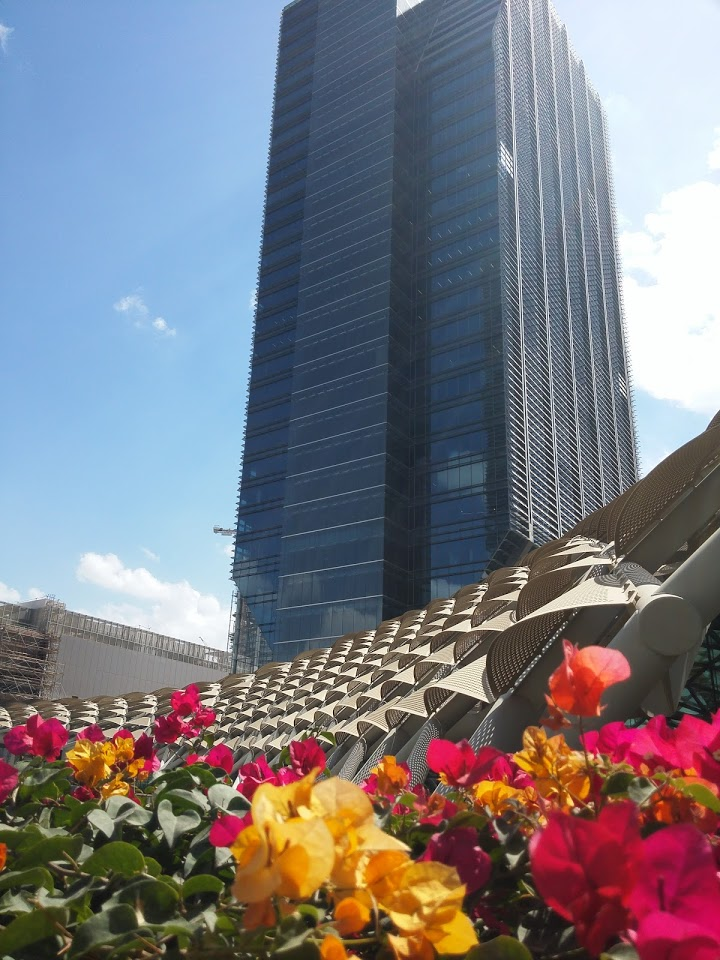
Galleria at Al Maryah Island - 2019

The Galleria at Al Maryah Island (part of the mixed-use complex Al Maryah Central) is a shopping center on Al Maryah Island, Abu Dhabi in the United Arab Emirates with 2,300,000 square feet (210,000 m^{2}) of gross leasable space. The mall links to The Galleria and combined, they cover over 2.7 million square feet with hundreds of retail, dining and entertainment and leisure-oriented tenants.

== Retail facilities ==
There are 5 levels, of which 4 hold retail space. In total there are approximately 400 retail stores, and health club. There is an open-air, roof top food hall, over 145 providers including al fresco cafés, bistros and fine dining restaurants. Also present are a multi-screen cinema, and food market.

== Facilities ==
There are just over 7000 parking spaces. There is a children’s entertainment park as well as a rooftop park with an outdoor amphitheater.

== Mixed-use facilities ==
The precinct will also feature two, 400,000 square foot integrated towers comprising a mix of hotel serviced and residential apartments and luxury residences.
