= Abu Dhabi Mall =

Coordinates: 24°29′47″N 54°23′1″E

- مركز أبو ظبي

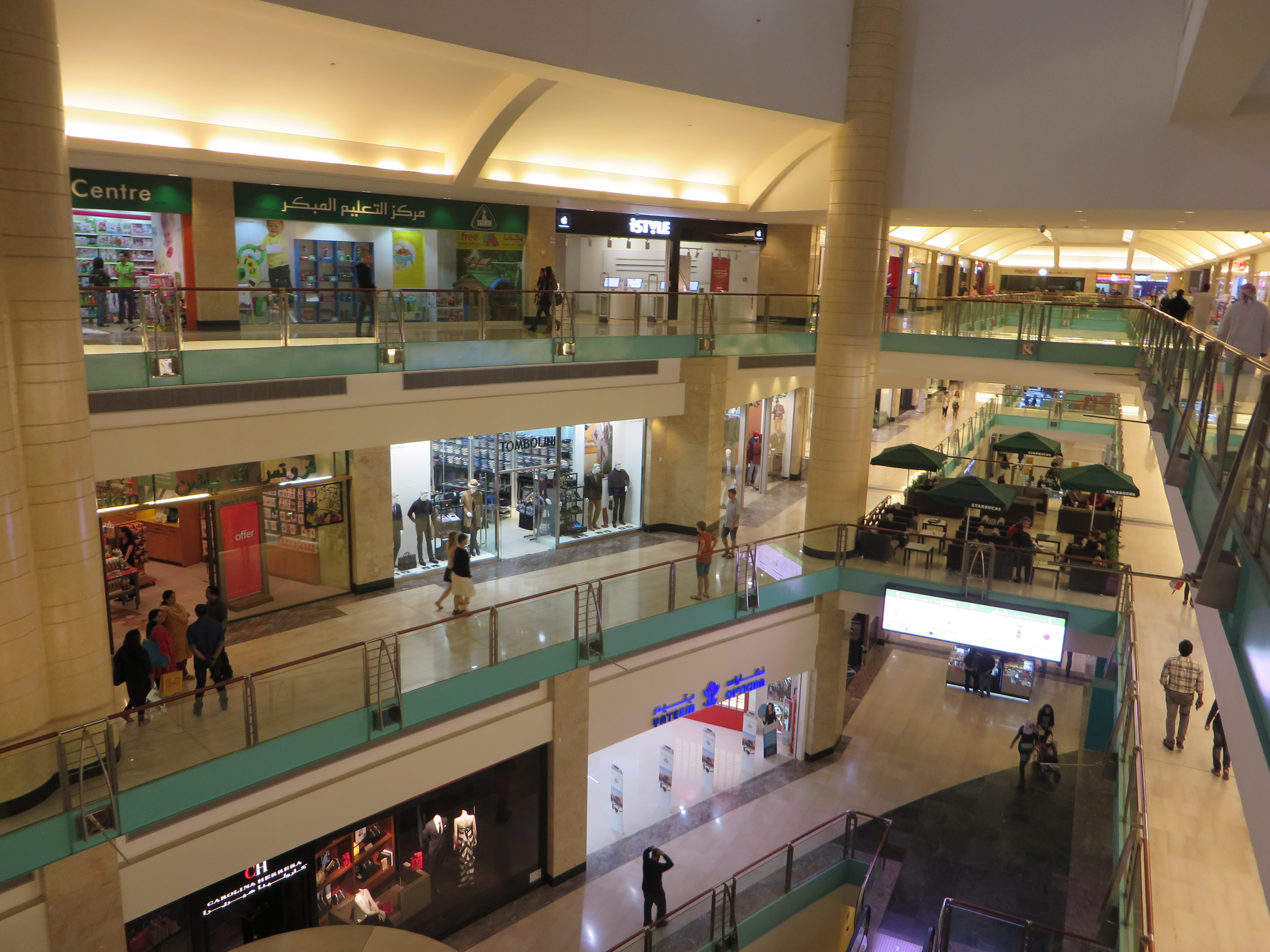
- A view of the mall on the third floor.
- Location: Abu Dhabi, UAE
- Opened: 15 May 2001; 25 years ago
- Website: www.abudhabi-mall.com

Abu Dhabi Mall is a shopping mall in central Abu Dhabi, United Arab Emirates. It opened on 15 May 2001 and has over 200 shops, food court and cinema. The mall is located next to the Beach Rotana hotel, with a direct internal entrance from the hotel. In January 2017, Forbes recognized Abu Dhabi Mall as the second best shopping mall in Abu Dhabi.

== Cafes ==
- Café Nero
- Cold Stone Creamery
- Cinnabon
- Baskin Robbins
- Charleys Philly Steaks

== Restaurants ==
- Bosporus (Turkish)
- Chili's (American)
- Denny's
- Gourmet Burger Kitchen
- Famous Dave's BBQ

== Stores ==
=== Fashion ===
- Lacoste
- Mango
- Mothercare
- Nike
- Polo Ralph Lauren
- Riva
- Skechers
- Springfield

=== Beauty ===
- Kiko Milano
- Lush Cosmetics
- MAC
- Nectar Bath Treat
- Sephora
- Swatch
- Pandora

=== Retail ===
- Blockbuster UAE

== See also ==
- List of shopping malls in the United Arab Emirates
