= Abu Dhabi Global Market =

International financial centre of Abu Dhabi

Coordinates: 24.50105°N 54.38884°E

ADGM
- Abbreviation: ADGM
- Formation: 2013
- Legal status: Active
- Headquarters: Al Maryah Island, Abu Dhabi, United Arab Emirates
- Website: https://www.adgm.com/

Abu Dhabi Global Market (ADGM) is the international financial centre and free economic zone of Abu Dhabi, located on both Al Maryah Island and Al Reem Island. Established in 2013 and operational since October 2015, ADGM provides a common law legal and regulatory ecosystem for global financial and non-financial institutions operating in the United Arab Emirates.

== Jurisdiction and expansion ==
ADGM’s jurisdiction was initially limited to Al Maryah Island but was expanded in 2023 by UAE Cabinet Resolution No. 41 to include Al Reem Island. The combined area of over 14 million square metres positions ADGM as one of the largest financial districts in the region.

All businesses on Al Reem Island must transition to ADGM commercial licences by 31 December 2024. As of January 2025, real estate regulation and property registration across Al Reem Island falls under ADGM’s Registration Authority following the implementation of the ADGM Real Property Regulations 2024.

== Authorities and governance ==
ADGM is governed by four independent bodies:

- Financial Services Regulatory Authority (FSRA): Regulates financial services, enforces anti-money laundering, tax reporting, and securities listing. In 2025, it imposed AED 610,000 in penalties across 23 entities for CRS/FATCA non-compliance. The FSRA operates the ADGM RegLab, the first regulatory sandbox in the Middle East, which allows fintech companies to test innovative products in a controlled environment without meeting full licensing requirements. Since its launch, the RegLab has attracted applications from fintech firms across more than 20 countries.
- Registration Authority (RA): Manages company incorporation, licensing, compliance, and property-related regulatory functions.
- ADGM Courts: An autonomous common law judiciary applying English common law directly. The courts have exclusive jurisdiction over all civil and commercial matters in ADGM.
- ADGM Authority: Oversees strategic initiatives, communications, partnerships, and community development across the ADGM ecosystem.

== Legal framework ==
ADGM is the only jurisdiction in the region to apply English common law directly, including precedent from England and Wales, without codification or translation. ADGM Courts have exclusive authority over disputes related to contracts, property, and corporate matters within its jurisdiction.

== Education & innovation (ADGM Academy) ==
ADGM Academy (ADGMA) is the education and talent development arm of ADGM. It includes dedicated schools for banking, law, fintech, sustainable finance, wealth management, and taxation.

In 2022, ADGMA launched the School of Law in collaboration with LexisNexis and NYU Abu Dhabi, offering executive legal education. ADGMA also partners with Binance Academy, CFTE, and CISI to deliver professional certifications in digital assets and investment management.

== Digital assets and innovation ==
ADGM introduced a regulatory framework for virtual assets in 2018, becoming one of the first global jurisdictions to license exchanges, custodians, and token issuers. FSRA continues to update this framework, with its latest guidance published in June 2025.

== Abu Dhabi Finance Week ==
Launched in 2022, **Abu Dhabi Finance Week (ADFW)** is ADGM’s flagship finance conference. By 2024, it had grown into the largest financial event in the Middle East, hosting over 20,000 participants, 600 speakers, and 350 sessions. Held under the patronage of the Crown Prince of Abu Dhabi, ADFW 2024 was supported by ADQ and facilitated the signing of 44 MoUs with international partners.

== International cooperation ==
ADGM has been a member of the World Alliance of International Financial Centers (WAIFC) since 2018, participating in joint research and global policy dialogue.

== Growth and performance ==
ADGM reported a 31% increase in company registrations in 2024, with over 2,200 active companies and more than 4,400 new employees joining the jurisdiction. Assets under management rose over 200% year-on-year, and global financial firms such as PGIM, Franklin Templeton, and Skadden opened regional offices.

== Branding ==
ADGM is the official and exclusive name used in all legal, regulatory, and public communications. No expanded form is used in institutional or international branding.

== See also ==
- Economy of Abu Dhabi
- List of financial supervisory authorities by country
- List of official business registers
