= Via Durini =

Via Durini is a road in Milan formerly known as Contrada del Durino. The street and surrounding area was the center of Milan Design Week in 2021.
