= Al Maryah Island =

Island in the United Arab Emirates

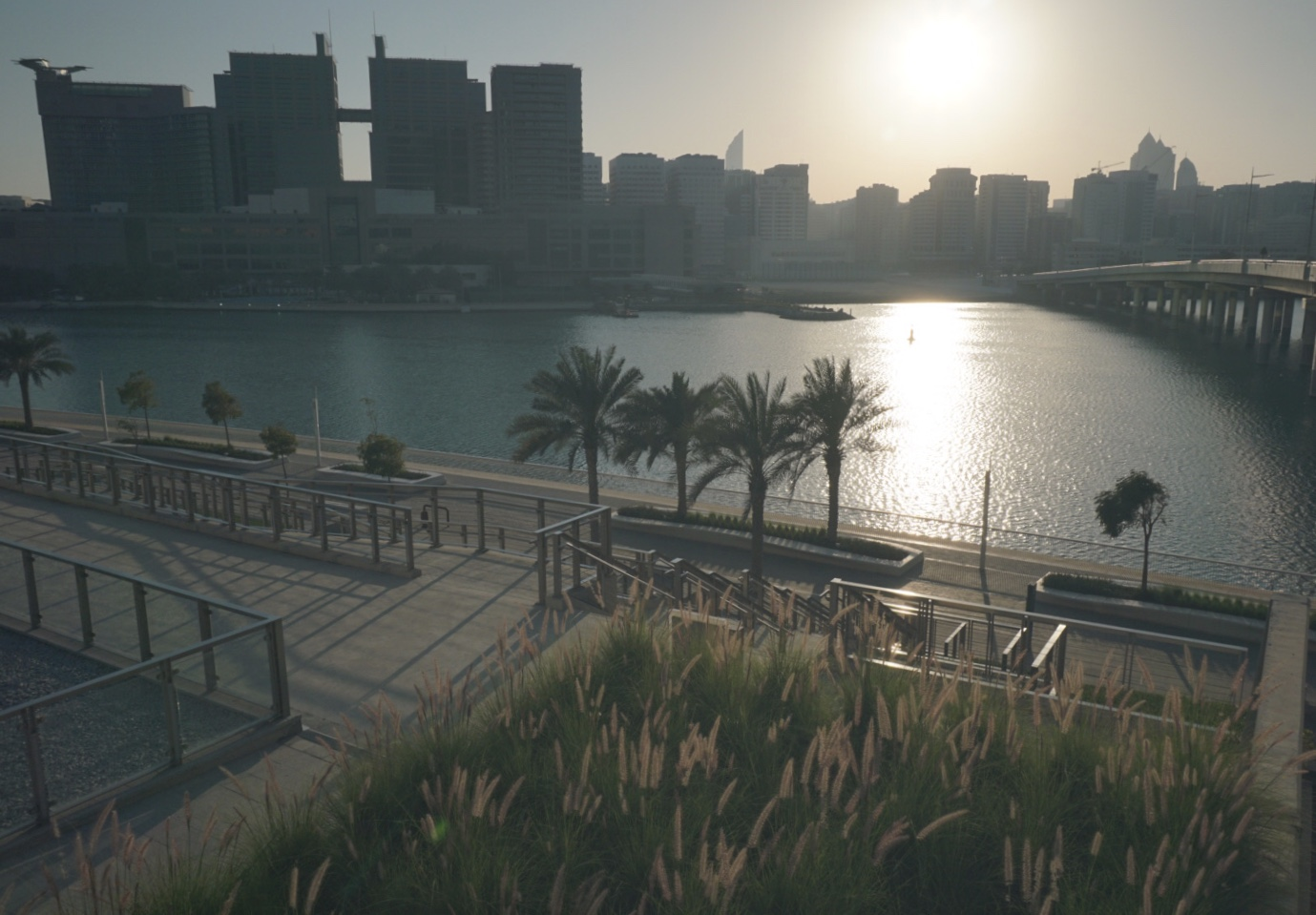
- A view from Maryah Island overlooking the city of Abu Dhabi
- Interactive map of Al Maryah Island

Geography
- Coordinates: 24°30′07″N 54°23′24″E

Administration
- United Arab Emirates

Al Maryah Island (Arabic: جزيرة المارية) is designated as the Central Business District of Abu Dhabi, the capital of the United Arab Emirates. Previously named Sowwah Island, it is a natural island located northeast of the Abu Dhabi Island, and west of Reem Island. It is managed by the Mubadala Investment Company as well as Aldar, and serves as the home of the Abu Dhabi Global Market (ADGM), an international financial free-zone operating under English Common Law.

Positioning itself as the 'Capital of Capital', Al Maryah Island is a mixed-use development zone comprising grade A commercial offices, luxury retail and hospitality, and specialised healthcare facilities. It is the regional base for many multi-national financial institutions such as J.P Morgan, Morgan Stanley, Goldman Sachs, and "new private equity" such as BlackRock and Brevan Howard. It is also home to The Galleria, one of Abu Dhabi's largest luxury retail complexes; Cleveland Clinic Abu Dhabi, a multi-specialty hospital; and two 5-star hotels, namely the Rosewood Hotel and the Four Seasons Hotel. The island also features multiple apartment residences.

Announced in December 2025 through a joint venture by Aldar and Mubadala, the northern side of Al Maryah Island is earmarked for a massive expansion of office, residential and retail space, doubling the available office space on the island, along with 3000 luxury waterfront apartments, as well as a landmark hotel.

== History ==
The island was previously named Sowwah Island, prior to its designation as the financial district and its renaming. It was a low-lying, uninhabited sandbar and salt flat (sabkha), separated from the main island by a short channel.

In 2007, the Abu Dhabi Urban Planning Council (UPC) designated the island as the site for the new Central Financial District, in an effort to relieve congestion in the existing downtown area. Extensive dredging and land reclamation work was done between 2007 and 2009 in order to stabilize the shoreline and build the infrastructure to support underground infrastructure.

In 2012, the island was opened to the public with the completion of the Sowwah Square (Later to be named ADGM Square). Coinciding with this, the island was renamed to Al Maryah Island, referencing a village in the Liwa Oasis, inhabited by a large number of Arabian Oryx called Al Maryah.

This was followed by the establishment of the Abu Dhabi Global Market (ADGM) in 2013 through Federal Decree No. 15 to establish the island as a financial free zone, operating separately from UAE civil courts to attract foreign investment. ADGM became operational in 2015.

== Geography and infrastructure ==
The island covers approximately 114 hectares (280 acres), and is located along the eastern coast of the Abu Dhabi island and west of Reem Island.

The island features a multi-level segregated grid system to manage its density:

- Podium Level: The podium level is built ~15 meters above ground level. This level is reserved for light vehicle traffic and pedestrian walkways.
- Service Level: The ground level is a service road network built to allow logistics and heavy-traffic to occur 'underground', removing heavy-vehicles from the pedestrian level.
- Pedestrian Level: Enclosed, climate controlled levels built between major commercial and lifestyle centres, allowing pedestrian movement across centres without exposure to the summer climate.

The Island is connected to the main island and Reem Island though a series of four connection bridges each. Three new bridges will be built in the new North Maryah expansion project, one to Reem Island, one to Mina Zayed/Tourist Club Area and one to connect to Saadiyat Island on E12 highway through Abu Dhabi Island.

== See also ==
- Economy of Abu Dhabi
- Mubadala Investment Company
- Abu Dhabi Global Market
