= The Power Principle =

Documentary film directed by Scott Noble

The Power Principle is a non-profit documentary movie directed by Scott Noble and released online for free.

The film makers explore how, in their view, the United States establishment promotes a culture of fear in order to secure increased military expenses, year after year.

The film claims the U.S. government and the military-industrial complex, together with the U.S. media, developed a powerful propaganda machinery (inspired in good part from Nazi propaganda) in order to scare and convince the public that U.S. invasions like those in Dominican Republic (1965), Grenada (1983), U.S. support for brutal mass killings, terror campaigns like those in Guatemala (1954), Indonesia (1965), El Salvador (1979), US-designed assassination plots like those in Nicaragua (1981) and in huge parts of Latin America (Operation Condor) and support for overthrowing democratically elected governments like those in Brazil (1964) and Chile (1973) were needed in order to prevent the spread of communism, using mainly the domino theory.

The movie also points at the help provided by the Western countries to fascist regimes in order to counter movements supporting workers rights (socialism, communism, anarchy). The fascism is presented as an instrument in the hands of the plutocracy for oppressing and enslaving the working class.

The meaning of the movie's title, "The power principle" is revealed as the Mafia principle, which is "not allowing disobedience" - in this case not allowing the countries in the developing world to have governments that try to improve the life of the many.

The movie traces the roots of the U.S. establishment (both Republican and Democrat parties) mindset into the doctrine of Edward Bernays, pioneer in the field of public relations and propaganda, who believed the democracy is hard to handle and people are just too stupid to govern themselves in democracy, so there is a need of an elite, public guardians who manage the society and there is a need of public relation practitioners who would be professionals in working for the government for managing, manipulating the public and engineering consent.

The film is split into three parts: "Empire", "Propaganda" and "Apocalypse".

== Participants ==
The film features interviews with:

- Nafeez Ahmed, British investigative journalist
- John Perkins, American author of Confessions of an Economic Hit Man
- James Petras, Bartle Professor (Emeritus) of Sociology at Binghamton University in Binghamton, New York
- Marcia Esparza, from Historical Memory Project
- Peter Linebaugh, American Marxist historian
- Noam Chomsky, American linguist and political commentator
- Graeme MacQueen, retired professor of religious studies at McMaster University in Hamilton, Ontario
- Adam Tomlinson, from National Public Radio (UK)
- Christopher Simpson, professor of Journalism at School of Communication, American University, Washington D.C., author of Science of Coercion
- Howard Zinn, American historian
- Nancy Snow, Pax Mundi (“Distinguished”) Professor of Public Diplomacy, Kyoto University of Foreign Studies
- Michael John Parenti, American political scientist
- William I. Robinson, American professor of sociology at the University of California, Santa Barbara
- John Stauber, American progressive writer
- Morris Berman, American historian and social critic, author of Dark Ages America
- William Blum, American author, Rogue State: A Guide to the World's Only Superpower
- Stanislav Yevgrafovich Petrov, retired lieutenant colonel of the Soviet Air Defence Forces
- Sara Flounders, American political writer
- Michael Albert, American activist

The movies also includes anti-establishment speeches of:

- Naomi Klein, Canadian author of The Shock Doctrine
- Ralph McGehee, former CIA officer
- Philip Agee, former CIA officer and writer
- John Stockwell, former CIA officer
- Thomas P.M. Barnett, American military geostrategist

== See also ==
- The Power of Nightmares, a BBC documentary film series pointing at the fear inducing tactics of the U.S. government, used to secure public support for its latest military interventions in Iraq and Afghanistan.
- The War on Democracy, a 2007 documentary film, criticizing both the United States' intervention in foreign countries' domestic politics and its "War on Terrorism".
- Red Scare
- Overseas interventions of the United States
