= Pat Bagley =

American editorial cartoonist and journalist

- Born: Patrick Bagley; 1956 (age 69–70); Salt Lake City, Utah, U.S.
- Notable work: Editorial cartoons for The Salt Lake Tribune
- Awards: Herblock Prize (2009), Torch of Freedom Award (2007), Pulitzer Prize finalist (2014)

Patrick "Pat" Bagley (born 1956) is an American editorial cartoonist and journalist for The Salt Lake Tribune in Salt Lake City, Utah, and an author and illustrator of several books.

== Biography ==
Bagley was born in Salt Lake City and raised in Oceanside, California, where his father was mayor and his mother was a school teacher. Always interested in politics, Bagley participated in a PBS interview of Ronald Reagan when he was in high school. As a member of the Church of Jesus Christ of Latter-day Saints (LDS Church), he was a proselyting missionary in the Bolivia La Paz Mission from 1975 to 1977. In 1978, he received his degree in political science (with a history minor) from Brigham Young University (BYU) in Provo, Utah.

Bagley has two sons, Miles and Alec. Will Bagley, Pat's older brother, is an accomplished historian of the western United States and coauthored This is the Place!: A Crossroads of Utah's Past with Pat in 1996.

In October 2009, while reacting to recent statements by Dallin H. Oaks, an LDS Apostle, about gay marriage protesters and religious freedom, Bagley commented that he was "retired" from the church, though not bitter or angry, and considers his LDS life a "good experience" and "in my blood."

=== Cartooning ===
In 1977, during a finance class at BYU, Bagley doodled a political cartoon, which he submitted to the student newspaper, The Daily Universe. This became his first published cartoon, which was reprinted in Time Magazine just weeks later. Bagley submitted more cartoons to the Universe and targeted campus issues, such as the Brigham Young University Honor Code. Some believe the attention from his cartoons helped change the policy.

After graduation, Bagley briefly worked as a caricaturist in the nearby Orem Mall, before being hired as the editorial cartoonist at The Salt Lake Tribune, where he still produces a daily cartoon. His cartoons have appeared in The Washington Post, The Guardian, The Wall Street Journal, Newsweek and the Los Angeles Times. Over the years, he has produced more than 6,000 cartoons for the Tribune. He is syndicated in over 450 American newspapers by Cagle Cartoons. Daryl Cagle ranks Bagley as the second most popular political cartoonist on his index.

Bagley is also an illustrator and author of independent political cartoons and children's books. His liberal political stance contrasts with the conservative state of Utah, and has influenced several books of political cartoons and humor, including 101 Ways to Survive Four More Years of George W. Bush, Clueless George Goes To War!, Clueless George Is Watching You!, and Clueless George Takes on Liberals!.

Bagley describes himself as a former moderate Republican who became a liberal independent during the presidency of George W. Bush. Bagley often addresses the predominant Utah culture of conservative politics and the LDS Church. Bagley's joking about Jell-O consumption in Utah helped motivate the Utah State Senate to declare in an official 2001 Legislative Resolution that Jell-O is "a favorite snack food of Utah."

In September 2020, Bagley drew a cartoon that showed a police officer looking at an X-ray for himself with a doctor. The doctor said "there’s your problem" while pointing to the X-ray which has the outline of a white hooded Ku Klux Klan figure. The cartoon was condemned by law enforcement groups and led to a protest of The Salt Lake Tribune. Bagley defended himself, saying that "I went to some pains to show that not all police are racist....white supremacists make a point of infiltrating law enforcement. That’s a fact. That’s a problem."

In April 2021, The Salt Lake Tribune published another Bagley cartoon that likened Utah congressman Burgess Owens (an African American) to a Ku Klux Klan member. Owens, who grew up in the segregated South, called the cartoon “pathetic.” Utah Senators Mike Lee and Mitt Romney and Representatives Chris Stewart, John Curtis and Blake Moore issued a joint statement calling the cartoon "repugnant" while enjoining the Tribune to retract it and issue an apology. Bagley responded by accusing Owens of promoting "dangerous conspiracy theories."

=== Olympic pins ===
For the 2002 Salt Lake Olympics, Bagley designed many popular commemorative pins that poked fun at local themes, including a "Seven Brides for One Brother" pin and a "Crickets Make Me Barf" seagull pin. During the Olympics, Bagley sold out of his Utah-themed pins and many in high demand were sold at inflated prices. After the events had ended, Bagley continued to produce pins as the only recognized "pin artist" in the world.

=== Leaving the United States ===
On July 4, 2025, Bagley announced that he was moving to Portugal. "This has been years in the planning," he wrote. "I first considered leaving on election night 2016. When Jan 6 didn’t absolutely destroy the GOP and Trump brands, I knew it was prudent to make plans." He went on to draw parallels between current U.S. events and those of 1930s Europe, particularly the Spanish Civil War. "MAGA is full-on fascist," he wrote, "the real malignant deal in all its facets." Bagley wrote that he loved the US and hoped to return for visits, but acknowledged that his cartoons and editorials might mean it would be difficult for him to enter the country under the current Administration.

== Honors ==
- In 1992, Bagley received the Wilbur Award for Religious Communication from the Religious Public Relations Council for a cartoon in the April 23, 1991 Tribune. He was the first cartoonist to receive the award, which is given for "outstanding communication of religious values in the news and entertainment media."
- Bagley's 2002 book Dinosaurs of Utah and Dino Destinations was nominated for the Utah Children's Book of the Year.
- In 2006, Bagley was honored by the Utah Headliners Chapter of the Society of Professional Journalists as the best editorial cartoonist in Utah.
- Bagley was dubbed "Best Illustrator" by Salt Lake City Weekly in their 2007 Artys awards, which annually honor the best artistic talent in the city.
- Bagley was the recipient of the 2007 Torch of Freedom Award from the American Civil Liberties Union of Utah.
- Bagley was awarded the 2009 Herblock Prize for editorial cartooning by a unanimous panel of judges, made up of Garry Trudeau, Jules Feiffer and John Sherffius, representing the Herb Block Foundation.
- Bagley was a finalist for the 2014 Pulitzer Prize in Editorial Cartooning "for his adroit use of images and words that cut to the core of often emotional issues for his readership."

== Publications ==
- Mormons: History, Culture, Beliefs: 2004, White Horse Books (ISBN 0974486035)

=== Children's books ===
- If You Were a Girl in the Time of the Nephites: 1989, Deseret Book (ISBN 0875792499)
- If You Were a Boy in the Time of the Nephites: 1989, Deseret Book (ISBN 0875792502)
- I Spy a Nephite: 1991, Deseret Book (ISBN 0875794157), reissued 2000, White Horse Books paperback (ISBN 1566845750)
- A Nephite in the Works: 1992, Deseret Book (ISBN 0875796303)
- Hana, the No-Cow Wife: 1993, Deseret Book (ISBN 0875797148)
- Where Have All the Nephites Gone: 1993, Deseret Book (ISBN 0875797571)
- Peek-A-Boo Magic: 1995, Buckaroo Books (ISBN 1885628005)
- Norman the Nephite's & Larry the Lamanite's Book of Mormon Time Line: 1995, Deseret Book (ISBN 087579906X)
- Showdown at Slickrock: 1995, Buckaroo Books (ISBN 1885628021)
- Norman the Nephite and the A-maze-ing Conference Center: 2000, White Horse Books (ISBN 1566845920)
- Dinosaurs of Utah and Dino Destinations: 2001, White Horse Books (ISBN 1566846013)

=== Political satire ===
- 101 Ways to Survive Four More Years of George W. Bush: 2005, White Horse Books, (ISBN 0974486043)
- Clueless George Goes To War!: 2005, White Horse Books (ISBN 0974486051)
- Clueless George Is Watching You!: 2006, White Horse Books (ISBN 097448606X)
- Clueless George Takes on Liberals!: 2006, White Horse Books (ISBN 0974486078)
- Fist Bump Heard 'Round the World: The 2008 Election in Cartoons: 2008, White Horse Books (ISBN 0980140625)

=== Social and religious satire ===
- I am Appalled...: A Collection of Daily Universe Cartoons: 1979, BYU Chapter of the Society of Professional Journalists and Sigma Delta Chi, with Steve Benson
- We Survive World War Three and You Give Us Light Beer?: Life After Megadeath: 1983, Gibbs Smith (ISBN 0879051418)
- Treasures of Half-Truth: 1986, Signature Books (ISBN 0-941214-47-8)
- "Oh My Heck!": A Pretty, Great Cartoon Book: 1988, Signature Books (ISBN 0941214680)
- The Best of Bagley: 20 Years of Cartoons from The Salt Lake Tribune: 1998, Slickrock Books (ISBN 1892936011)
- Welcome to Utah: 2001, White Horse Books (ISBN 1566846080)
- Bagley's Utah Survival Guide: 2008, White Horse Books (ISBN 0980140609)

=== Illustrator ===
- Legalizing Adulthood in Utah: 1991, Aspen West, by Tom Barberi
- Sunday of the Living Dead: 1995, Buckaroo Books, by Robert Kirby (ISBN 978-1-885628-49-7)
- Astro-Nuts!: Riddles About Astronauts and the Planets They Love: 1995, Buckaroo Books, by Rick Walton (ISBN 1-885628-12-9)
- Dino-Might: Pre-Hysterical Dinosaur Riddles: 1995, Buckaroo Books, by Rick Walton (ISBN 1-885628-080)
- The Ghost Is Clear!: Riddles about ghosts, vampires, witches, and other creatures: 1995, Buckaroo Books, by Rick Walton (ISBN 1-885628-11-0)
- Wholly Cowboy!: Cowboy, Cow, and Horse Riddles: 1995, Buckaroo Books, by Rick Walton (ISBN 1-885628-07-2)
- Wake Me for the Resurrection: 1996, Buckaroo Books, by Robert Kirby (ISBN 1885628471)
- Norman the Nephite's Church History Time Line: 1996, Deseret Book, by William W. Slaughter (ISBN 1573451959)
- This is the Place!: A Crossroads of Utah's Past: 1996, Buckaroo Books, by Will Bagley (ISBN 1885628250)
- Pat & Kirby Go To Hell: 1997, Slickrock Books, by Robert Kirby (ISBN 1885628463)
- J. Golden Kimball Stories: 1999, White Horse Books, by James N. Kimball (ISBN 1566845491)
- Family Home Screaming: 1999, Slickrock Books, by Robert Kirby (ISBN 1892936089)
- Kirby Soup for the Soul: 2003, White Horse Books, by Robert Kirby (ISBN 0974486027)
- Fit Kids Cookbook: 2004, White Horse Books, by Kate Duffy and Sarah McRedmond (ISBN 097093016X)
