= National Press Foundation =

Organization

- Abbreviation: NPF
- Formation: 1975; 51 years ago
- Type: NGO
- Legal status: Foundation
- Headquarters: Washington, D.C., U.S.
- Region served: United States
- President: Anne Godlasky
- Staff: 7
- Website: www.nationalpress.org

The National Press Foundation is a nonprofit journalism training organization. It educates journalists on complex issues and trains them in reporting tools and techniques. It recognizes and encourages excellence in journalism through its awards.

NPF programs are held in Washington, D.C., and other U.S. and international cities. It has recently produced trainings on vaccine development, poverty and inequality in America, international trade, and the 2020 election.

== History ==
The National Press Foundation was incorporated in the District of Columbia on Aug. 5, 1975, as part of the National Press Club. In 1980, under the leadership of Donald R. Larrabee, it became an independent organization. Its first educational program was a 1981 conference at Princeton University aimed at improving business and economics reporting, held at a time when journalism schools had few programs to prepare business writers. NPF expanded to offer training programs on other topics around the United States, as well as internationally.

With a grant from Evelyn Y. Davis and The Evelyn Y. Davis Foundation, the National Press Foundation built a broadcast studio in 2014, called Studio works | The Evelyn Y. Davis Studio.

During the 2020 COVID-19 pandemic, NPF began offering its training online.

== Organization and leadership ==
NPF is managed by an executive committee and is governed by a volunteer board of directors.

The organization's current president is Anne Godlasky. The chairman of the board is Amos Snead. Past presidents of NPF include Sandy K. Johnson, Bob Meyers, Robert Alden, Frank Aukofer, Joseph Slevin, and David Yount, all former journalists.

== Programs ==
In 2010, NPF offered a training program called Cancer Issues 2010, underwritten by Pfizer. The advertised goal was to train journalists to “understand the latest research” on various cancers, including the role of pharmaceutical products and vaccines. MicroRNA (miRNA) was also a listed topic.

== Funding ==
NPF is funded by sponsors of individual training programs, an annual awards dinner, and an endowment. Sponsors include media organizations, foundations, corporations, and individuals.

Some of NPF’s current and recent funders include Arnold Ventures, the Hinrich Foundation, the David & Lucile Packard Foundation, Bloomberg Philanthropies, CNN, Toyota, Twitter, Johnson & Johnson, Fondation Ipsen, Bayer, the Evelyn Y. Davis Foundation, W.K. Kellogg Foundation, GlaxoSmithKline, Heising-Simons Foundation, American Association for Cancer Research, American Society of Addiction Medicine and Honda.

NPF has previously been funded by Pfizer, the Bill & Melinda Gates Foundation, Eli Lilly and Company, the Global HIV Vaccine Enterprise, World Health Organization, TB Alliance, Business Roundtable, Mayo Clinic, Prudential Financial, AdvaMed, Huawei, Pharmaceutical Research and Manufacturers of America (PhRMA), the United States Chamber of Commerce, and Verizon Communications.

== Awards ==
In 1984, NPF created its first award to honor Sol Taishoff, the late founder of Broadcasting Magazine. The foundation now offers a slate of journalism awards to celebrate work that represents the highest standards of journalism. NPF awards are made by a vote of individual committees and ratified by the board of directors.

Since 1989, the NPF has presented the Clifford K. and James T. Berryman Award annually for editorial cartooning. Winners have included Chip Bok (1993), Jim Morin (1996), Rex Babin (2000), Signe Wilkinson (2001), Kevin Kallaugher (2002), Ann Telnaes (2003), Jimmy Margulies (2005), Steve Sack (2006), Matt Wuerker (2010), Nick Anderson (2011), Adam Zyglis (2013), Clay Bennett (2014), Darrin Bell (2016), Ruben Bolling (2021), Ward Sutton (2022), Jen Sorensen (2023), and Tom Tomorrow (2024).
