= Clay Bennett (cartoonist) =

American cartoonist (born 1958)

- Born: January 20, 1958 (age 68) Clinton, South Carolina, U.S.
- Area: Editorial cartoonist
- Awards: Pulitzer Prize for Editorial Cartooning, 2002

Clay Bennett (born January 20, 1958, in Clinton, South Carolina) is an American editorial cartoonist. His cartoons typically present liberal viewpoints. Currently drawing for the Chattanooga Times Free Press, Bennett is the recipient of the 2002 Pulitzer Prize for Editorial Cartooning.

Graduating from the University of North Alabama in 1980, Bennett briefly served as a staff artist at the Pittsburgh Post-Gazette and the Fayetteville Times (NC). He worked as an editorial cartoonist at the St. Petersburg Times for 13 years (1981–1994) but was fired in 1994. While Bennett's editor Phil Gailey denied the firing was politically motivated, some observers saw it as part of the traditionally liberal newspaper's trend towards becoming more conservative. Bennett said "Many saw the termination as political because I was out there on the far left. Obviously expressing your point of view can cost you your job." He later worked for The Christian Science Monitor (1997–2007) and now draws five cartoons a week for the Chattanooga Times Free Press, having joined its staff in 2007.

A nominated finalist for The Pulitzer Prize eight times, Bennett won the Prize for Editorial Cartooning in 2002. He's also the recipient of the Sigma Delta Chi Award, the National Journalism Award, the Robert F. Kennedy Journalism Award, the John Fischetti Award, the National Headliner Award, the Thomas Nast Award from the Overseas Press Club, the Berryman Award from the National Press Foundation, the Ranan Lurie/United Nations Political Cartoon Award and the National Cartoonists Society's Award for Editorial Cartoons.

A past president of the Association of American Editorial Cartoonists, Bennett lives in Chattanooga with his wife, artist Cindy Procious. His work is syndicated internationally by Counterpoint Licensing and Syndication.

== Awards ==
- 2024 National Headliner Award for Editorial Cartoons
- 2023 National Headliner Award for Editorial Cartoons
- 2019 Sigma Delta Chi Award, Society of Professional Journalists
- 2019 Green Eyeshade Award for Editorial Cartoons, Society of Professional Journalists
- 2018 Green Eyeshade Award for Editorial Cartoons, Society of Professional Journalists
- 2017 NCS Award for Editorial Cartoons, National Cartoonists Society
- 2017 Sigma Delta Chi Award, Society of Professional Journalists
- 2017 Thomas Nast Award, Overseas Press Club of America
- 2016 Green Eyeshade Award for Editorial Cartoons, Society of Professional Journalists
- 2016 National Headliner Award for Editorial Cartoons
- 2014 Clifford K. and James T. Berryman Award for Editorial Cartooning, National Press Foundation
- 2014 Green Eyeshade Award for Editorial Cartoons, Society of Professional Journalists
- 2013 Grambs Aronson Award for Cartooning with a Conscience, Hunter College
- 2013 Champion of Equality, Tennessee Equality Project
- 2012 Green Eyeshade Award for Editorial Cartoons, Society of Professional Journalists
- 2011 Green Eyeshade Award for Editorial Cartoons, Society of Professional Journalists
- 2011 United Nations/Ranan Lurie Political Cartoon Awards
- 2010 Green Eyeshade Award for Editorial Cartoons, Society of Professional Journalists
- 2009 Green Eyeshade Award for Editorial Cartoons, Society of Professional Journalists
- 2008 Ink Bottle Award, Association of American Editorial Cartoonists
- 2007 Thomas Nast Award, Overseas Press Club of America
- 2007 Robert F. Kennedy Journalism Award for Cartoons
- 2005 Thomas Nast Award, Overseas Press Club of America
- 2005 John Fischetti Award for Editorial Cartooning
- 2005 Alumni of the Year, University of North Alabama
- 2004 Grand Prize, National Population Cartoon Contest
- 2004 National Headliner Award for Editorial Cartoons
- 2002 Pulitzer Prize for Editorial Cartooning
- 2002 NCS Award for Editorial Cartoons, National Cartoonists Society
- 2002 National Journalism Award, Scripps Howard Foundation
- 2001 Sigma Delta Chi Award, Society of Professional Journalists
- 2001 John Fischetti Award for Editorial Cartooning
- 2001 Editorial Cartoonist of the Year, Editor & Publisher magazine
- 2000 National Headliner Award for Editorial Cartoons
- 1999 National Headliner Award for Editorial Cartoons
- 1994 Green Eyeshade Award for Editorial Cartoons, Society of Professional Journalists
- 1990 Jane Roe Media Award, Florida Abortion Rights Action League
- 1986 H. L. Mencken Award for Best Cartoon, Free Press Association
- 1984 Green Eyeshade Award for Editorial Cartoons, Society of Professional Journalists
- 1979 Society for Collegiate Journalists Award for Editorial Cartoons

== Nominations and citations ==
- 2024 Finalist, Pulitzer Prize for Illustrated Reporting and Commentary
- 2022 Finalist, NCS Award for Editorial Cartoons, National Cartoonists Society
- 2022 Finalist, Green Eyeshade Award for Editorial Cartoons, Society of Professional Journalists
- 2021 Finalist, National Headliner Award for Editorial Cartoons
- 2020 Finalist, National Headliner Award for Editorial Cartoons
- 2020 Finalist, Green Eyeshade Award for Editorial Cartoons, Society of Professional Journalists
- 2018 Finalist, NCS Award for Editorial Cartoons, National Cartoonists Society
- 2017 Finalist, National Headliner Award for Editorial Cartoons
- 2017 Finalist, Green Eyeshade Award for Editorial Cartoons, Society of Professional Journalists
- 2015 Citation for Excellence, United Nations/Ranan Lurie Political Cartoon Awards
- 2015 Finalist, Green Eyeshade Award for Editorial Cartoons, Society of Professional Journalists
- 2014 Finalist, NCS Award for Editorial Cartoons, National Cartoonists Society
- 2014 Finalist, Herblock Prize
- 2013 Finalist, NCS Award for Editorial Cartoons, National Cartoonists Society
- 2013 Finalist, Pulitzer Prize for Editorial Cartooning
- 2013 Finalist, National Headliner Award for Editorial Cartoons
- 2012 Finalist, NCS Award for Editorial Cartoons, National Cartoonists Society
- 2010 Citation for Excellence, United Nations/Ranan Lurie Political Cartoon Awards
- 2009 Finalist, Thomas Nast Award, Overseas Press Club of America
- 2009 Finalist, International Editorial Cartoon Competition, Canadian Committee for World Press Freedom
- 2009 Finalist, National Headliner Award for Editorial Cartoons
- 2008 Finalist, Pulitzer Prize for Editorial Cartooning
- 2008 Finalist, Green Eyeshade Award for Editorial Cartoons, Society of Professional Journalists
- 2007 Citation for Excellence, United Nations/Ranan Lurie Political Cartoon Awards
- 2006 Citation for Excellence, United Nations/Ranan Lurie Political Cartoon Awards
- 2003 Finalist, Pulitzer Prize for Editorial Cartooning
- 2001 Finalist, Pulitzer Prize for Editorial Cartooning
- 2001 Finalist, National Journalism Award, Scripps Howard Foundation
- 2000 Finalist, Pulitzer Prize for Editorial Cartooning
- 1999 Finalist, Pulitzer Prize for Editorial Cartooning
