= Herblock Prize =

- Awarded for: editorial cartooning
- Venue: Library of Congress
- Country: United States
- Presented by: The Herb Block Foundation
- Rewards: $15,000 and trophy
- First award: 2004
- Website: HerbBlockFoundation.org

The Herblock Prize for editorial cartooning is an annual $15,000 after-tax cash prize, and a sterling silver Tiffany trophy. Designed "to encourage editorial cartooning as an essential tool for preserving the rights of the American people through freedom of speech and the right of expression," it is named for the editorial cartoonist Herblock and sponsored by The Herb Block Foundation.

The rotating three-judge panel that determines the award-winner is typically composed of the previous year's winner, another editorial cartoonist, and a scholar of editorial cartooning. The award is typically presented some time between March and May of each year, at the Library of Congress.

Each award presentation is accompanied by a guest lecturer who discusses contemporary social issues "in the spirit of Herblock." Previous Herblock Prize guest lecturers include Ben Bradlee, President Barack Obama, Sandra Day O’Connor, Tom Brokaw, Tim Russert, Ted Koppel, George Stevens, Jr., Jim Lehrer, Garry Trudeau, Gwen Ifill, and Bob Woodward.

Finalists for the award have been named since 2011; they receive a $5,000 after-tax prize.

== History ==
When Herb Block died in October 2001, he left $50 million with instructions to create a foundation to support charitable and educational programs that help promote and sustain the causes he championed during his 72 years of cartooning. The Herb Block Foundation is committed to defending the basic freedoms guaranteed all Americans, combating all forms of discrimination and prejudice, and improving the conditions of the poor and underprivileged through the creation or support of charitable and educational programs with the same goals. The Foundation is also committed to improving educational opportunities to deserving students through post-secondary education scholarships and to promoting editorial cartooning through continuing research. The Herb Block Foundation awarded its first grants and the annual Herblock Prize in editorial cartooning in 2004.

In 2011, Ann Telnaes became the first female Herblock Prize finalist. In 2012, Matt Bors became the first alternative-weekly cartoonist to win the Herblock Prize. in 2014, Jen Sorensen became the first female Herblock Prize award-winner.

== Award recipients ==
Year	Winner	Organization
2026	Jack Ohman	San Francisco Chronicle
2025	Marty Two Bulls Sr
2024	Steve Brodner
2023	Ann Telnaes	The Washington Post
2022	Lalo Alcaraz	Andrews McMeel Syndication
2021	Rob Rogers	Pittsburgh Post-Gazette (formerly)
2020	Michael de Adder	CounterPoint
2019	Matt Davies	Newsday
2018	Ward Sutton	The Boston Globe
2017	Ruben Bolling	Tom the Dancing Bug
2016	Mark Fiore	Self Syndicated
2015	Kevin Kallaugher (KAL)	The Baltimore Sun & The Economist
2014	Jen Sorensen	The Austin Chronicle
2013	Tom Tomorrow	This Modern World
2012	Matt Bors	www.MattBors.com & CartoonMovement.com
2011	Tom Toles	The Washington Post
2010	Matt Wuerker	Politico
2009	Pat Bagley	Salt Lake Tribune
2008	John Sherffius	Camera of Boulder, Colorado
2007	Jim Morin	Miami Herald
2006	Jeff Danziger	Rutland Herald in Rutland, Vt.
2005	Tony Auth	Philadelphia Inquirer
2004	Matt Davies	Journal News of Westchester County, N.Y.

== Award finalists ==
Year	Finalist	Organization
2025	Peter Kuper
2024	Pedro Molina
2023	Michael Ramirez	Las Vegas Review-Journal
2022	Peter Kuper	The New Yorker & The New York Times
2021	Darrin Bell	"Candorville"
2020	Matt Lubchansky	The Nib
2019	Clay Jones	Self Syndicated
2018	Steve Brodner
2017	Marty Two Bulls, Sr.	Indian Country Today Media Network
2016	Ken Fisher, AKA Ruben Bolling	"Tom the Dancing Bug”
2015	Mike Luckovich	The Atlanta Journal-Constitution
2014	Clay Bennett	The Chattanooga Times Free Press
2013	Jack Ohman	The Sacramento Bee
2012	Jen Sorensen	JenSorensen.com
2011	Ann Telnaes	The Washington Post
