= Tony Namate =

Zimbabwean cartoonist (born 20th century)

- Born: 20th century
- Known for: Political cartooning

Tony Namate (born 20th century) is a Zimbabwean cartoonist who has gained international recognition for his scathing cartoon commentary on socio-political issues in Zimbabwe and beyond.

His 2011 collection of political cartoons, whose title – The Emperor's New Clods – alludes to Hans Christian Andersen's "The Emperor's New Clothes", has been described by the Association of American Editorial Cartoonists’ Kevin Kallaugher as “...[puncturing] the pomposity of the powerful on behalf of the poor and the powerless.”

== Early and personal life ==
Growing up on American comics and British funnies his father would bring home from work, Namate was more fond of the drawings than he was of the text. He later became addicted to Mad magazine in high school in the 1980s, where he read Julius Caesar as well as George Orwell's Animal Farm. The parallels between his country's political situation and what he read would shape what was to become his political outlook.

== Career ==
Namate credits his career as a cartoonist to the pioneer cartoonist in Zimbabwe, Hassan Musa, the first black cartoonist in the country in the 1970s. Namate started his career as an editorial cartoonist in 1988 with the Zimbabwean state-controlled The Herald newspaper in Harare, where he worked till 1991 when he left to do independent political cartoons.

He joined the Daily News, an independent daily in Harare, as an editorial cartoonist in 1999 when Zimbabwe politics was in turmoil. President Robert Mugabe, after leading the struggle to liberate the country from white minority rule, was being increasingly criticized for his autocratic style of governance and for human rights abuses while the economy was experiencing a worrisome nose-dive.

Namate's work has earned him attacks and threats of legal from the government of Zimbabwe, which has described him as "treasonable, infuriating and unacceptable". The Daily News, the independent paper he worked for in the late 1990s, suffered a series of dangerous attacks, including one with a homemade bomb on 22 April 2000. A year later, in January 2001, another explosion blew up the daily's printing press. The paper and the cartoonist managed to carry on despite these attacks and the Daily News only shut its doors in 2003, when the government refused to grant it a permit. Namate refused to give up and rather went to work for the website New Zimbabwe.

=== Honors ===
Namate was a runner-up of the United Nations Correspondents Association's 2000 Ranan Lurie Political Cartoon Award, and was awarded the Cartoonists Rights Network, International's Courage in Editorial Cartooning Award, which he received in Lexington, Kentucky, in 2004.

=== Publications ===
- State of the Nation (1997)
- Writing on the Wall (1998)
- The Emperor's New Clods: Political Cartoons from Zimbabwe (2011)
