= Jim Morin =

American cartoonist

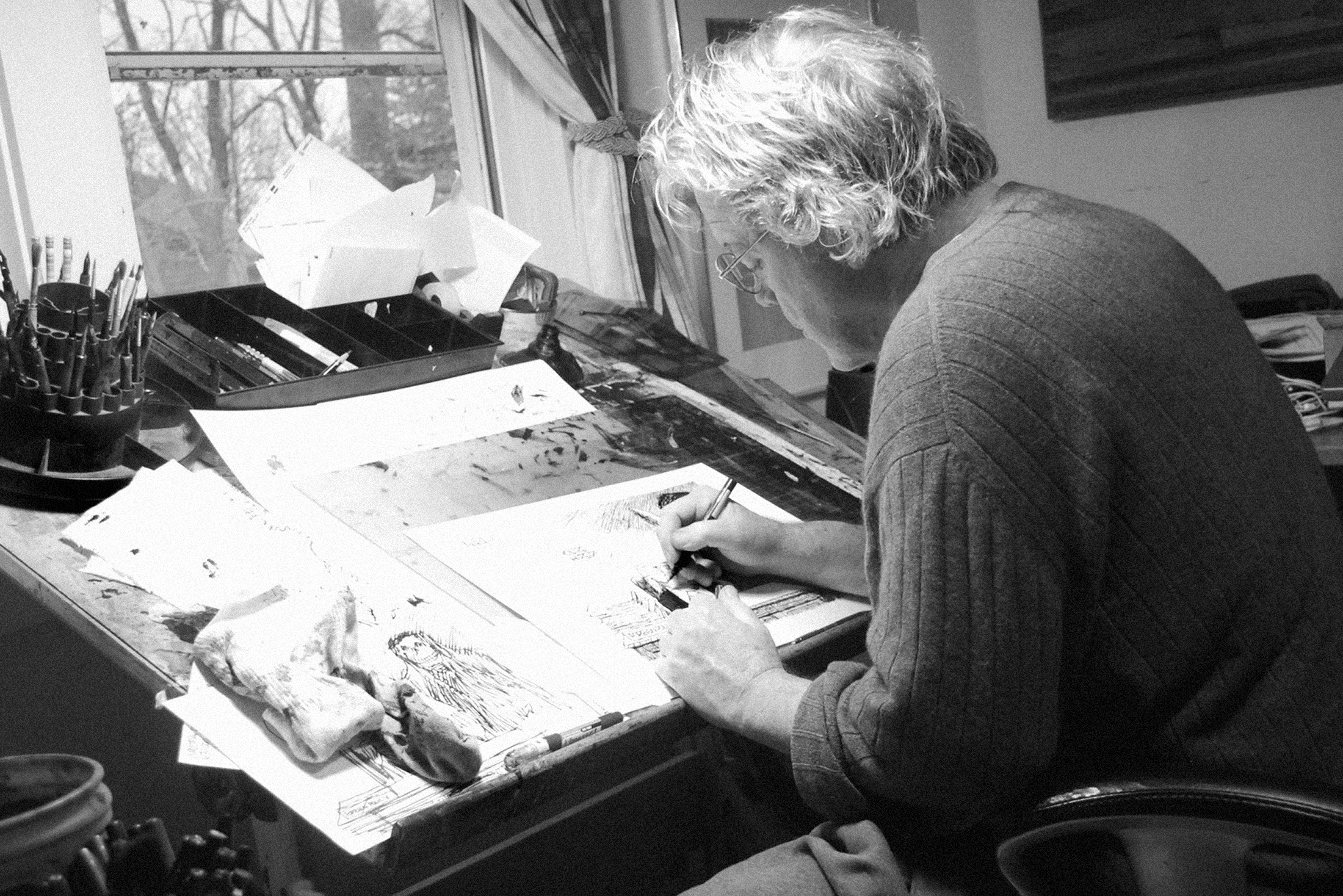
- Morin in 2023
- Born: January 30, 1953 (age 73); Washington, D.C.
- Known for: Visual arts, painting
- Spouse: Danielle Morin
- Awards: Overseas Press Club Awards, 1979 & 1990; Pulitzer Prize, Miami Herald Editorial Board, 1983; National Cartoonist Society Editorial Cartoon Award, 1992; Pulitzer Prize for editorial cartooning, 1996 & 2017; Berryman Award, 1996; John Fischetti Award, 2000; Thomas Nast Prize, 2002; Herblock Prize, 2007
- Website: www.jimmorin.com

Jim Morin (born 1953) is the internationally-syndicated editorial cartoonist and painter. He was the political cartoonist at the Miami Herald from 1978 to 2019. His cartoons have included extensive commentary on eight U.S. presidents: Richard Nixon, Gerald Ford, Jimmy Carter, Ronald Reagan, George H. W. Bush, Bill Clinton, George W. Bush, Barack Obama and Donald Trump.

Morin was awarded the Pulitzer Prize for editorial cartooning in 1996 and again in 2017. He also shared in the Miami Herald's editorial writing Pulitzer Prize in 1983. As the editorial cartooning Pulitzer category no longer exists, Morin is the last editorial cartoonist to have received the award. Morin is also syndicated nationally and internationally by his own Morintoons Syndicate. He was previously syndicated by CWS/The New York Times Syndicate and by King Features Syndicate.

His cartoons and caricatures run in newspapers in states including New York, Alaska, Colorado, Ohio, Oregon, California, Michigan, Arkansas, Tennessee, Virginia, Washington, D.C., Texas, as well as in Canada and countries in Europe and Southwest Asia. His work has appeared in national magazines, various books and on Internet sites and magazines. Morin has been interviewed on CNN, WFOR, NPR, Sky News (the 24-hour European television news station), Comcast Newsmakers and several other television programs.

== Biography ==
Morin was born on January 30, 1953, in Washington, D.C. and raised in the Massachusetts suburb of Wayland. He began drawing at age seven.

He attended the Rivers School in Weston, Massachusetts and Suffield Academy in Connecticut, and studied painting and drawing at Syracuse University under Jerome Witkin. "He was the only teacher I had who saw cartoons as paintings, as art," Morin says. "Painting has made me more conscious.. . . My paintings affect my drawings and vice versa." The Watergate scandal inspired Morin to explore the art of caricature. During his senior year at Syracuse, he was the editorial cartoonist for their daily student newspaper, The Daily Orange. He graduated from Syracuse in 1975 with a degree in illustration and a minor in painting.

Following college, Morin served a brief stint as the editorial cartoonist at The Beaumont Enterprise before moving on to Richmond, Virginia, where he spent one year as the editorial cartoonist at the Richmond Times-Dispatch. During his time in Richmond, Morin became a professional acquaintance of Jeff MacNelly, the Pulitzer Prize-winning cartoonist at the Richmond News Leader. In December, 1978, Morin moved to The Miami Herald where he worked until his retirement in 2019.

Throughout his editorial cartooning career, he also worked evenings on his oil paintings and his work was shown at many galleries and museum shows throughout Florida. Morin retired from the Miami Herald in 2020, with his last cartoon being published in the paper on 1 January 2020.

== Books ==
Morin is the author of several books: Line of Fire: Political Cartoons by Jim Morin, Bushed, and Ambushed. (The latter two cartoon collections contained words by Walter C. Clements.)

Morin's work has also been shown in compendiums of political cartoons and on the PBS documentary, The American Presidents.

Morin's watercolor work is evident in his book, Jim Morin's Field Guide to Birds.

== Exhibitions ==
His cartoons have been exhibited worldwide, most recently at The Ogunquit Museum of American Art, where in 2022, a selection of his cartoons focused on issues of the environment were showcased alongside a selection of his landscape paintings. His cartoons were also featured in an exhibition at the University of Miami's Lowe Art Museum, where he also spoke to a packed and standing audience. His retrospective exhibition of cartoons at the International Museum of Cartoon Art hung for nine months due to popular demand.

The Coral Springs Museum of Art exhibited a large body of his work in its two-month show, Jim Morin: Art of Politics Drawings & Paintings in 2008. His canvasses have been exhibited in Miami group shows at the Museum of Science, the Art Collector's Gallery, the Don Webb Gallery, the Virginia Miller Gallery and Patou Fine Art. He had a one-man show at the Futernick Gallery in Miami in 2006. On the web, his paintings can be viewed on his website and at that of Absolute Arts.

== Awards ==
Morin won the Pulitzer Prize for editorial cartooning in 1996 and in 2017. He shared the Pulitzer with the Miami Herald Editorial Board in 1983 and was a Pulitzer finalist in 1977 and 1990. In 2007, he won the prestigious Herblock Prize. Upon awarding the Herblock Prize to Morin, Harry Katz, the Herb Block Foundation curator, praised Morin for his "impressive, unrelenting barrage of cartoons and caricatures displaying artistry, courage and conviction."

Internationally he has won the Thomas Nast Prize, given every three years. Nationally, he has also been awarded the 2000 John Fischetti Award, the 1996 National Press Foundation Berryman Award, the 1992 National Cartoonist Society Editorial Cartoon Award, and the Overseas Press Club Awards in 1990 and 1979.
