= The Emperor's New Clods =

The Emperor's New Clods: Political Cartoons from Zimbabwe
- Author: Tony Namate
- Language: English
- Genre: Cartoon
- Publisher: Lion Press in collaboration with the New Zimbabwe Media Limited
- Publication date: 2011
- Publication place: Zimbabwe
- Media type: Print (Paperback)
- Pages: 114
- ISBN: 0956663869
- Preceded by: Writing on the Wall

The Emperor's New Clods: Political Cartoons from Zimbabwe is a collection of political cartoons by Tony Namate. The collection features cartoons published by the cartoonist in Zimbabwean newspapers between 1998 and 2005, highlighting some landmark moments in a troubled period of the country's history.

The book, whose title alludes to the tale "The Emperor's New Clothes" by Hans Christian Andersen, is said to have been described by the Association of American Editorial Cartoonists’ Kevin Kallaugher as “...[puncturing] the pomposity of the powerful on behalf of the poor and the powerless.”
