= The Madness of King George (book) =

2004 book by Michael K. Smith and Matt Wuerker

The Madness of King George: The Ingenious Insanity of Our Most "Misunderestimated" President
- Cover of the paperback edition
- Author: Michael K. Smith
- Illustrator: Matt Wuerker
- Language: English
- Subject: George W. Bush
- Publisher: Common Courage Press
- Publication date: 2004
- Publication place: Canada
- ISBN: 978-1-56751-248-9
- OCLC: 53819725

The Madness of King George: The Ingenious Insanity of Our Most "Misunderestimated" President is a political satire book written by Michael K. Smith and illustrated by Matt Wuerker. It was published in 2004 by Common Courage Press in Canada. Alternating between text and cartoons, it takes a critical look at George W. Bush's life and first term as president of the United States, portraying it all as a rush to war in Iraq.

== Reception ==
Publishers Weekly gave the book a negative review. Peter C. Newman, writing for The Globe and Mail, called it "a delicious send-up with nothing held back".
