= Marty Two Bulls Sr =

American editorial cartoonist

Marty Two Bulls Sr (born 1961 or 1962) is an American editorial cartoonist. He was a finalist for the Pulitzer Prize for Editorial Cartooning in 2021, but the award was not given that year.

== Biography ==
Two Bulls comes from an artistic family of Oglala Lakota from the Pine Ridge Indian Reservation. He grew up in Rapid City, South Dakota, where he did editorial cartoons for Central High School's school newspaper. He attended The Art Institute of Colorado, then took jobs at KOTA-TV, the Rapid City Journal, and the Argus Leader. He completed an art degree at the Institute of American Indian Arts once his children matured. Since then, he splits his time between New Mexico and South Dakota. His editorial cartoons focus on issues of interest to Native Americans. They often take an ironic point of view, point out solutions that he finds obvious, or highlight perceived hypocrisy.

In 2012, he won the Sigma Delta Chi Award from the Society of Professional Journalists, and he was a finalist for the 2017 Herblock Prize. In 2021, he was a finalist for the Pulitzer Prize for Editorial Cartooning, but the award was not given that year, which was protested by the Association of American Editorial Cartoonists, Cartoonists Rights Network International, National Cartoonists Society, and publisher Andrews McMeel Syndication.
