= Jimmy Margulies =

American cartoonist

- Born: October 8, 1951 (age 75)
- Areas: Editorial cartoonist, Caricaturist
- Awards: National Headliner Award (1996); Fischetti Award (1996); National Press Foundation Barryman Award (2005); Association for Women in Communications Clarion Award (2007, 2008, 2010, 2011)
- Children: 2

Jimmy Margulies (born October 8, 1951) is an American editorial cartoonist and caricaturist. His work appears daily in AM New York and on the website of Newsday, and is distributed nationally to over 425 papers by King Features Syndicate. His cartoons appear regularly in Time, Newsweek, The New York Times and USA Today.

== Biography ==
While at Carnegie Mellon University, Margulies started drawing and publishing editorial cartoons. He graduated there in 1973, earning a Bachelor of Fine Arts in graphic design.

In 1978-79, he worked as an artist in New York City for the Cultural Council Foundation CETA Artists Project, often contributing cartoons to the CCF Journal.

He is married to his wife Martha. They have two kids, Elana and David.

== Publications ==
Margulies has two collections of his cartoons published: My Husband is Not a Wimp! (1988), and Hitting Below the Beltway (1998).

== Awards and recognition ==
Margulies has won the National Headliner Award and Fischetti Editorial Cartoon Competition (1996), the Barryman Award from the National Press Foundation (2005), and four Clarion Awards from the Association for Women in Communications (2007, 2008, 2010, 2011). The National Rifle Association of America placed him on their blacklist, which he considers a badge of honor.

In its 2009 "Best of Everything" lists, Time magazine listed Margulies's "Save the Women and Children... and my bonus too" as its top editorial cartoon of the year.
