= Chip Bok =

American editorial cartoonist

- Born: Arthur Bernard Bok III; July 25, 1952 (age 74) Dayton, Ohio, U.S.
- Area: Cartoonist
- Notable works: Editorial cartoons
- Awards: National Cartoonist Society Editorial Cartoon Award, 1995 and 1999. National Press Foundation Berryman Award, 1993; John Fischetti Award, 1988 and 1998

Arthur Bernard "Chip" Bok III (born July 25, 1952) is an American editorial cartoonist for the Akron (Ohio) Beacon Journal and the Tampa Bay Times. He has illustrated some of Dave Barry's books, and was a finalist for the Pulitzer Prize in 1997.

== Early life ==
Born in Dayton, Ohio to University of Dayton team physician and former football player Arthur Bernard Bok, Jr., Bok began editorial cartooning in 7th grade math class, where he was influenced by Don Martin's work in Mad magazine. He attended college at his father's alma mater, where he was captain of the hockey team.

== Career ==
Prior to working as an editorial cartoonist, Bok held several other jobs such as substitute teaching, concrete labor, wholesale drug sales, and freelance work. From 1981 to 1982 he was staff editorial cartoonist at the Clearwater Sun in Clearwater, Florida. After his time there he drew a lifestyle cartoon for the Miami Herald, illustrated columns for Dave Barry, and created computer animations for the Viewtron online service. In 1987, he returned to his home state of Ohio where he became an editorial cartoonist for the Akron Beacon Journal.

In 1997 Bok was a finalist for the Pulitzer Prize.

In addition to several collections of cartoons, Bok has also illustrated a children's book written by Helen Thomas, The Great White House Breakout, which was published in 2008.

== Personal life ==
Bok is married to wife Deb and together they have four adult children. He currently lives in Akron, Ohio.

== Bibliography ==
- Bok! The 9.11 Crisis In Political Cartoons. (University Of Akron Press, 2002) ISBN 1884836895.
- A Recent History of the United States in Political Cartoons: A Look Bok. (University Of Akron Press, 2005) ISBN 193196811X.
- The Great White House Breakout. (illustrator, written by Helen Thomas) (Penguin Group, 2008) ISBN 978-0-8037-3300-8 (children's book)
