= Cartoonists Rights Network International =

American non-profit organization

- Founder: Dr. Robert I. Russell
- Purpose: Protecting the human rights and free expression of political and editorial cartoonists
- Origins: 1999
- Key people: Terry Anderson, executive director; Joel Pett, president; board members past and present including Kevin Kallaugher, Nikahang Kowsar, Ann Telnaes, Matt Wuerker
- Revenue: Public donations
- Website: www.cartoonistsrights.org

Cartoonists Rights Network International (CARTOONISTS RIGHTS) is a non-profit organization created in 1999 in the United States by the late Dr. Robert "Bro" Russell. It seeks to defend the human rights and especially the freedom of expression of political and editorial cartoonists.

CARTOONISTS RIGHTS "envisions a world where cartoonists are free to express themselves without fear of persecution" and "is dedicated to fostering a global community of cartoonists, advocating for the protection of their human rights, and providing support for the defense of those facing threats as a result of their work."

== Robert Russell Courage in Cartooning Award ==
Since its foundation in 1999, the organization has presented a $1000 annual Courage in Editorial Cartooning Award "to a cartoonist who is in great danger or has demonstrated exceptional courage in the exercise of free speech rights, or both". The award was re-named after its founder Robert Russell on his retirement in 2019. Since 2021 it has alternated biannually with the Kofi Annan Courage in Cartooning Award from the Freedom Cartoonists Foundation, Geneva.

=== Laureates ===
Year	Laureate	Country
1999	Doğan Güzel	Türkiye
2000	Essam Hanafy	Egypt
2001	Nikahang Kowsar	Iran
2002	Nyemb Popoli	Cameroon
2003	no laureate	
2004	Tony Namate	Zimbabwe
2005	Musa Kart	Türkiye
2006	Ali Dilem	Algeria
2006	« The Twelve Danish Cartoonists »	Denmark
2007	Zapiro	South Africa
2008	Baha Boukhari	Palestine
2009	Mario Robles Patiño	Mexico
2010	Mana Neyestani	Iran
2011	Zunar	Malaysia
2012	Aseem Trivedi	India
2012	Ali Ferzat	Syria
2013	Akram Raslan	Syria
2014	Kanika Mishra	India
2014	Majda Shaheen	Palestine
2015	Atena Farghadani	Iran
2016	Ali Dorani aka Eaten Fish	Iran
2017	Ramón Esono Ebalé	Equatorial Guinea
2018	Pedro X. Molina	Nicaragua
2019	Badiucao	China
2020	Ahmed Kabir Kishore	Bangladesh
2021	Lagoon Eain & Waiyan Taunggyi	Myanmar
2023	Abel Bellido Córdoba aka Abecor	Bolivia
2025	Zehra Ömeroğlu	Türkiye
