= Sickos =

- The character's most well-known appearance, from the 2015 comic Painful Procedural

Publication information
- First appearance: October 13, 2006
- Created by: Ward Sutton

"Sickos" is a term associated with a character colloquially referred to as the Sickos Guy, originating from a 2006 cartoon by Ward Sutton for The Onion, created under the pseudonym Stan Kelly. The character is shown as a disheveled man wearing a black shirt labeled "Sickos", grinning through a window and often saying, "Yes… Ha ha ha… Yes!"

Since its publication, the image has been adopted as an Internet meme, typically used to depict amusement or approval at situations perceived as negative, unfortunate, or otherwise undesirable such as schadenfreude. It has also been used in sports contexts, particularly among fans expressing enjoyment when teams perform poorly.

== Origin ==
Stan Kelly is a fictional persona created by Ward Sutton, depicted as a middle-aged editorial cartoonist with strongly conservative views. Through the character, Sutton satirizes fears of societal decline in the United States, which Kelly attributes to "sickos" who he believes endanger traditional values. Targets of Kelly’s criticism have included teenagers loitering and listening to rap bands, store managers who refuse coupons, and Michelle Obama's Let's Move! public health campaign. Kelly's cartoons often contradict themselves, adding to the satire. The character was first introduced in an October 13, 2006 cartoon, where he was portrayed as a school shooter looking through the window of a school, turned off by the school's aggressive self-defense class. However, the most well-known appearance of the character was in the February 16, 2015 cartoon Painful Procedural, in which the caption "If Drugs Are Legalized" accompanies a scene in which a stereotypical American family (another recurring element in Kelly's cartoons) watches a police procedural on television that ends due to a lack of crime. The family, labeled "honest viewers" and "innocent kids", reacts with distress alongside an anthropomorphized Statue of Liberty, while a newspaper headline reads "All crime dramas canceled". Outside the window, a man in a black shirt labeled "Sickos" grins and says, "Yes… Ha ha ha… Yes!" This figure, later known as the "Sickos Guy", became a recurring element in Kelly's cartoons, representing individuals who take satisfaction in perceived moral or societal decline, after the success of this cartoon. Various characters throughout Kelly's cartoons have been represented as "Sickos Guys", such as the crew of the USS Abraham Lincoln, which plans to "attempt suicide ... to make Trump look bad". Characters such as the Grim Reaper are similarly labeled as "Socialism" and "Communism".

Sutton explained in 2020 that the character’s black clothing and unkempt appearance were intended to signify villainy from Kelly’s perspective. Although the Sickos Guy is often portrayed as a stand-in for liberal and left-wing figures, Sutton clarified that the character was meant to reflect Kelly’s view of the general modern American rather than a specific political alignment.

== Popularity ==
The Sickos character, identified by his black shirt and the speech bubble reading "Yes… Ha ha ha… Yes!", became a popular image on social media, often used by users to express amusement at news or events perceived as unfortunate for the subject involved. In 2020, Nitish Pahwa of Slate noted political examples of its use, including mockery of efforts by Donald Trump supporters to overturn the 2020 United States presidential election and reactions to the Republican Party’s threats to boycott the 2020–21 United States Senate election in Georgia.

Ward Sutton, who was frequently tagged when the image circulated, stated that he was uncertain how it became a meme, describing its spread as "a complicated and weird thing". He characterized the phenomenon as "mind-blowing" and expressed appreciation that the image generally appeared to be used humorously rather than maliciously. While Sutton welcomed the character’s popularity, he criticized unauthorized commercial use of the image. Official merchandise featuring the Sickos Guy is produced by The Onion.

Its popularity has given rise to variants as well. Notably, in the wake of the 2026 announcement that the Paris prosecutor's office searched through the French offices of X over the Grok chatbot's image generation feature, (Note: See Grok sexual deepfake scandal.) a variant spread on rival social media platform Bluesky depicting the character as a stereotypical French aristocrat with a shirt saying "Pervers," still grinning through a window saying "Oui... hon hon hon... oui!" This variant was typically used with a news outlet's article on the office raid as a quote-post.

== Sports ==
"We're the Sickos because we watch everything. It's not the teams who are Sickos. We're the ones who are sick. We're the ones at the window looking in, going, 'Ha Ha Ha … Yes!' at all these great games."

— Jordan Edmonson, Sickos Committee member

Sickos Guy has been adopted as an informal mascot by sports fans who take enjoyment in games involving struggling teams or unusual circumstances.

In 2020, college football fans created the Sickos Committee Twitter account from a Discord server for sportswriters. The account focuses on highlighting games where both teams perform poorly, as well as other unconventional or humorous moments in college football, Canadian football, and various niche sports. For example, its top game for Week 9 of the 2022 season featured Iowa, which had the lowest-ranked offense in the country, against Northwestern, which had not won a game in the United States for over a year. (Note: Northwestern's only victory during this stretch was in Ireland.) At the end of the season, Iowa was named the Committee's "national champion" for finishing 130th out of 131 teams in total offense, an honor marked by a fundraiser for a food bank in Iowa City.

During the 2023 Quick Lane Bowl, play-by-play announcer Connor Onion referenced the meme after a low-scoring 10–9 first half, remarking that the "Sickos Committee is out there saying, 'Ha ha ha... Yes!'".

The Committee frequently promotes MACtion (midweek Mid-American Conference games) and "Pac-12 After Dark" (late-night Pac-12 Conference games), both known for unpredictable and entertaining outcomes with low viewership. George Smith, who refers to himself as the Committee's commissioner, stated in 2022 that the group genuinely enjoys the sport for its unusual events and does not intend to mock teams or players. Ward Sutton expressed support for the Committee's use of his character, provided it was not monetized.

The meme also gained popularity among fans of the Ottawa Senators during the 2020–21 NHL season, when the team was performing poorly. Supporters used the Sickos Guy as a symbol of ironic optimism, cheering for losses to improve the team's NHL entry draft lottery odds. A Twitter user named Chris, credited with starting the Sens Sicko movement, described it as "a backwards way of cheering for the Sens" that made defeats enjoyable. The Senators organization embraced the meme by selling Sickos-themed cardboard cutouts for games held without spectators due to COVID-19 restrictions and by playing a parody of the song "Say I Yi Yi" with Sickos-themed lyrics at home games. Following a March 14, 2021 victory over the Toronto Maple Leafs, head coach D. J. Smith referenced the trend, saying, "I love the passion of the fans, and I gotta say to them: 'YES... HA HA HA... YES!'"
