= Doğan Güzel =

- Occupation: Cartoonist

Doğan Güzel is a Kurdish Turkish-born cartoonist. He is best known for his satirical comic strip Qirix.

== Early life ==
Doğan Güzel is from Diyarbakır, a city in southeastern Turkey that is the unofficial capital of the region of Turkish Kurdistan.

== Career ==
Doğan Güzel initially drew his comic strip Qirix for the newspaper Özgür Gündem from 1992 to 1995. "Qirix" is a pejorative name for a Kurdish masculine character type and the strip follows one example named Keko.

On 31 July 1998 Güzel was arrested and imprisoned in Istanbul's Bayrampasa Prison for four 1993 cartoons he drew for the pro-Kurdish publications Özgür Gündem and Özgür Ülke. Each cartoon included the phrase "Khape TC", which is usually translated as "the lax or weak Republic of Turkey," though the slang word "khape" also means "prostitute" or " bastard." He was sentenced to forty months – ten months for each cartoon – in prison for "insulting the State" under Article 159 of the Turkish Penal Code, which criminalizes a wide-range of expression. (It was replaced in 2005 with Article 301.) He spent a year in prison before he was pardoned and released on 16 September 1999 by Turkish President Süleyman Demirel. Güzel was awarded the first annual Award for Courage in Editorial Cartooning by the Cartoonists Rights Network International in 1999.

In 2012, Güzel sought political asylum in Spain, moved to Seville, and became a naturalized Spanish citizen.

When visiting Istanbul, Güzel was again arrested at the offices of Özgür Gündem on 17 August 2016. In the wake of the July 2016 Turkish coup d'état attempt, the government of Turkish President Recep Tayyip Erdoğan closed over 100 media outlets and arrested dozens of journalists. A court ruled that Özgür Gündem was a "mouthpiece" of the Kurdistan Workers’ Party and thus publishing “a terrorist organization’s propaganda." Police raided the offices of Özgür Gündem, seizing computers, beating journalists, and yelling "Armenians, Jews, sons of Lenin; you are going to find out about the strength of the Turkish state." Doğan Güzel was arrested along with nearly two dozen journalists. A photograph of Güzel in police custody with his shirt nearly torn off became a symbol for those protesting attacks on the Turkish press. Güzel and 22 journalists were released two days later.

In addition to his work as a newspaper cartoonist, Güzel contributed to the magazine Meme and illustrated the 1998 historical novel Ataların Karşılaşması by Cemal Resid Ahmed.
