= Killing Hope =

1995 book by William Blum

Killing Hope: U.S. Military and CIA Interventions Since World War II
- First edition
- Author: William Blum
- Language: English
- Subject: Central Intelligence Agency (U.S.)
- Genre: History
- Publisher: Common Courage Press
- Publication date: 1995
- Publication place: United States
- Media type: Print (Hardcover, Paperback)
- Pages: 500 pp
- ISBN: 1-56751-253-4
- OCLC: 53832319
- Preceded by: West-Bloc Dissident: A Cold War Memoir
- Followed by: Freeing the World to Death: Essays on the American Empire

Killing Hope: U.S. Military and CIA Interventions since World War II by William Blum is a history book on CIA covert operations and United States military interventions during the second half of the 20th century. The book, published in 1995 by Common Courage Press, takes a strongly critical view of American foreign policy. It is an updated and revised version of one of Blum's previous works, The CIA – A Forgotten History (1986).

The book covers various US foreign policy ventures from just after World War II onward. Its basic premise is that the American Cold War-era activities abroad were done with imperialist motives.

== Critical reception ==
Noam Chomsky called the book "far and away the best book on the topic." John Stockwell described it as "[t]he single most useful summary of CIA history", Ramsey Clark said it was a "valuable contribution", and International Security's Teresa Pelton Johnson wrote: "Blum has performed a very important service in collecting this information in one place, and the documentation is praiseworthy."

Ted Dace said Killing Hope is "[a] good, long look in the mirror".

Reviewing the earlier version of the book in 1986, Choice's R. H. Immerman wrote: "By falling prey to the same Manichean absolutism that has hamstrung US global policies, Blum has compromised the credibility of his work. He has nevertheless produced a valuable reference for anyone interested in the conduct of US foreign policy, including graduate students and general readers."

In the London School of Economics Review of Books in 2014, LSE doctoral researcher Julia Muravska unfavorably compared Killing Hope with the work of academic historians such as William Keylor, stating that Blum's criticism of the U.S. occurs in an historical vacuum without any consideration for Soviet actions that "would have also helped the reader understand what drove the US foreign policy decisions that today's citizens find so morally repugnant." She said that much of the book is "heavily and meticulously footnoted," said the 2014 edition's "The American Empire Post-Cold War" chapter has "unsubstantiated claims" and shallow analysis, saying that "Blum relies on ... RT to make his case" regarding the post-2014 Russo-Ukrainian War.

== Editions ==
First published in 1995, it has since been updated several times by the author.

- 1998 revised edition (Black Rose Books) ISBN 1-55164-096-1
- 2003 revised edition (Common Courage Press) ISBN 1-84277-369-0
- 2004 Updated Edition (Common Courage Press) ISBN 1-56751-252-6
- 2014 Updated Edition (Zed Books) ISBN 978-1783601776

== See also ==
- Timeline of United States military operations
- United States involvement in regime change
- Rogue State: A Guide to the World's Only Superpower
- Blowback (podcast), a podcast about American empire and US-led regime change
