= Jen Sorensen =

American cartoonist, born 1974

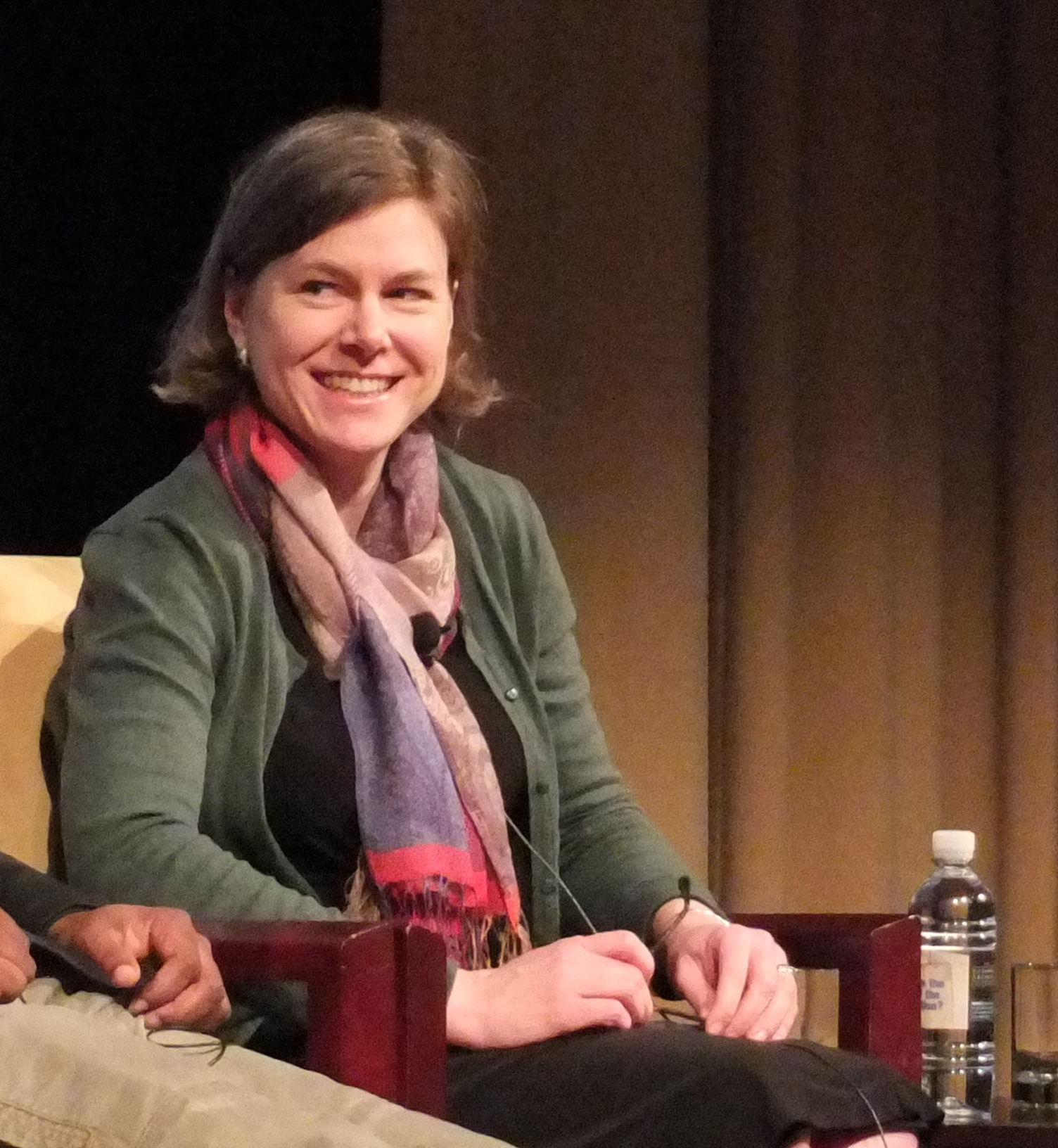
- Sorensen in 2015
- Born: September 28, 1974 (age 52) Lancaster, Pennsylvania, U.S.
- Area: Cartoonist
- Notable works: weekly strip under her own name
- Awards: 2017 Pulitzer Finalist; 2014 Herblock Prize; 2013 Robert F. Kennedy Journalism Award

Jen Sorensen (born September 28, 1974, in Lancaster, Pennsylvania) is an American cartoonist and illustrator who creates a weekly comic strip that often focuses on current events from a liberal perspective. Her work has appeared on the websites Daily Kos, Splinter, The Nib, Politico, AlterNet, and Truthout; and has appeared in Ms. Magazine, The Progressive, and The Nation. It also appears in over 20 alternative newsweeklies throughout America. In 2014 she became the first woman to win the Herblock Prize, and in 2017 she was named a Pulitzer Finalist in Editorial Cartooning.

== Career ==
Raised in Lancaster, Pennsylvania, Sorensen enrolled in the University of Virginia, where she drew a daily comic strip, Li'l Gus, for its student newspaper, University Journal, from 1994 to 1995, as well as contributing to the satirical magazine The Yellow Journal.

Sorensen soon became published in various comic anthologies, including Action Girl and the Big Book of the 70's. She published her own book, Slowpoke Comix #1, in 1998. In 1999, one year after the book was published, Slowpoke became a weekly comic strip. As of 2012 the strip goes simply by her own name, though a few alternative weekly papers continue to use the Slowpoke name.

Sorensen has published three volumes of cartoons: Slowpoke: Café Pompous from 2001, Slowpoke: America Gone Bonkers from 2004 and her latest book, Slowpoke: One Nation Oh My God! published in 2008. Besides her weekly political cartoon, she has produced illustrations for such periodicals as Nickelodeon Magazine, The American Prospect, The Dallas Observer, Women's Review of Books, and MAD Magazine.

She has written and illustrated a number of long-form comics, most notably a piece on health care reform commissioned by Kaiser Health News, and a synopsis of Jane Austen's Pride and Prejudice for NPR.

Sorensen has been a member of the artist collectives "Cartoonists with Attitude" and "Serializer."

She served as comics editor for Splinter News (formerly Fusion) from 2014 to 2018.

Sorensen is also a member of the National Advisory Council of the Billy Ireland Cartoon Library and Museum at Ohio State University.

She has been interviewed by Yahoo/ABC News (video), The Washington Post, as well as the University of Virginia Magazine; the latter web article has a video of Sorensen working.

== Awards ==
- 2000: Xeric Award
- 2005: Alternative Newsweekly Award, Cartoon (Five or fewer papers), 1st Place
- 2009: The Grambs Aronson Award for Cartooning With a Conscience, Hunter College
- 2012: Alternative Newsweekly Award, Cartoon, 1st Place
- 2012: National Cartoonists Society Reuben Award in Editorial Cartoons
- 2012: Herblock Prize Finalist
- 2013: Robert F. Kennedy Journalism Award
- 2013: National Cartoonist Society Award for Best Editorial Cartoons
- 2014: Herblock Prize
- 2017: Pulitzer Prize Finalist for Editorial Cartooning
- 2023: Clifford K. and James T. Berryman Award

=== Herblock Prize ===
In 2012, Sorensen was a Herblock Finalist and was later awarded the prize in 2014, making her the first woman to be awarded the prize. Sorensen was awarded the prize based on her portfolio containing work from her local weekly newspaper The Austin Chronicle, her regular publications in The Nation, Ms. Magazine, Politico, MAD Magazine, as well as her political cartoon, Slowpoke. The Herblock Foundation judges felt that, "Jen Sorensen’s strong portfolio addresses issues that were important to Herblock, such as gun control, racism, income inequality, healthcare, and sexism. Her style allows her to incorporate information which backs up the arguments she presents. Her art is engaging and her humor is sharp and on target.”

=== Pulitzer Prize ===
Sorensen was named a 2017 Pulitzer Prize Finalist in Editorial Cartooning for a variety of her work featured in several U.S. publications. Her nominated work includes several cartoons on the current political climate, such as The Trump Supporting Union Member, Poverty Injection, Radical Cleric vs. Trump, and more. According to the Pulitzer Prize board, Sorensen's work is powerful and "often challenging the viewer to look beyond the obvious".

== Books ==
Sorensen's comics have been published in several books, often published by Alternative Comics. Sorensen's books are generally compilations of her weekly comic strip, although the first book contained entirely new material. The Slowpoke books contain cartoon strips concerning U.S. politics and social justice issues. These comics comment on the Trump administration, the water crisis in Flint, Michigan, healthcare, climate change, and more topics related to the current U.S. political climate.

- Slowpoke Comix #1 - 1998 (Alternative Comics) (OCLC 63661994)
- Slowpoke: Café Pompous - 2001 (Alternative Comics) (ISBN 1-891867-02-4)
- Slowpoke: America Gone Bonkers - 2004 (Alternative Comics) (ISBN 1-891867-78-4)
- Slowpoke: One Nation, Oh My God! - 2008 (Ig Publishing) (ISBN 0-978843-16-9)
