= Ward Sutton =

American cartoonist

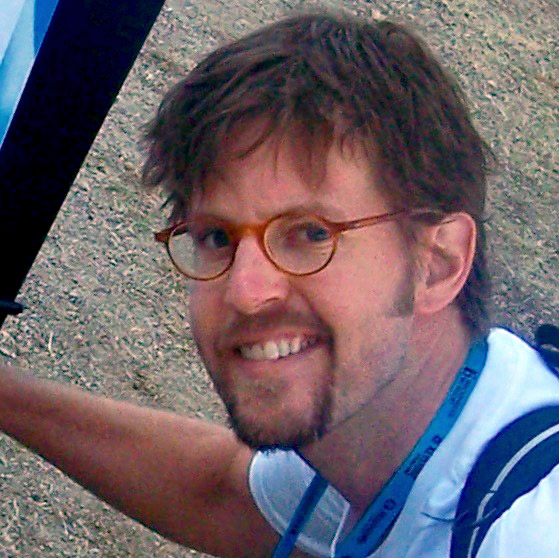
- Sutton attending the 2008 Democratic National Convention
- Born: Minneapolis, Minnesota, U.S.
- Occupations: Illustrator, cartoonist, writer
- Awards: Herblock Prize (2018) Berryman Award for Cartooning (2022)
- Website: suttonimpactstudio.com

Ward Sutton is an American illustrator, cartoonist and writer. His comic strip, Sutton Impact (formerly Schlock 'n' Roll), was published in The Village Voice from 1995 to 2007. Sutton won the Herblock Prize in 2018 for his work.

Sutton's editorial cartoons have appeared regularly in the Boston Globe since 2008. He is also a regular cartoonist for The Onion, where he draws under the pseudonym Stan Kelly.

== Career ==
Sutton has contributed cartoons and illustrations to the op-ed pages of The New York Times and to Rolling Stone, Time, The Nation, Entertainment Weekly and The New Yorker. He also illustrates and writes a parody political cartoon for The Onion under the pseudonym of "Stan Kelly", depicting the one-panels of an ultraconservative middle-aged cartoonist. According to Onion President Sean Mills in an interview with Wikinews, the cartoon has generated "a lot of heat ... He has a very unique take on what is going on in the world, and it does tend to upset some people, but that's the job of an editorial cartoonist, to be a provocateur."

In addition to his work for print media, Sutton designed the animation for the opening credits of the television show Strangers with Candy, and has created animation for HBO, VH-1, and TV Land. He has also designed silk-screened posters for a variety of musical acts, including Beck, Radiohead, Phish, and Pearl Jam.

In the 1990s Sutton worked for some time as editorial cartoonist at High Times Magazine.

== Awards ==
Sutton won the Herblock Prize for editorial cartooning in 2018. His win that year was reflective of a growing acceptance of multi-panel editorial cartooning. After winning the award, Sutton quipped that then-president Donald Trump could benefit from editorial cartoons, saying "They're shorter than the presidential briefings that he reportedly has no patience for. Plus, most these days are focused on his favorite subject – himself!"

In 2022 Sutton received the Clifford K. and James T. Berryman Award for political cartooning from the National Press Foundation.

== See also ==
- Sickos, a character Sutton created as Stan Kelly that became an Internet meme
