= Death of Akram Raslan =

The death of Akram Raslan, an artist known for his political cartoons, at the hands of the government of Syria brought condemnation from various publications around the world. Drawing themes from the Syrian civil war, Raslan had drawn images expressing criticism of Syrian leader Bashar al-Assad and Assad's actions against the Syrian people, as well as criticism of institutions such as the United Nations. While the cartoonist died in 2013, partial confirmation of the facts around the event were not released until 2015. However, many details remain uncertain.

== Background ==
Akram Raslan was born in the Syrian city of Hama in 1974. He was awarded the Cartoonists Rights Network, International (CRNI)'s 2013 winner of the Award for Courage in Editorial Cartooning.

Since the Syrian Civil War, along with many of Syria's artists, poets, writers and activists, Raslan remained incarcerated. He reportedly faced torture at the hands of his captors.

The news service Albawaba.com ran an article commenting that the "story of Raslan's detainment has become a disturbingly common one for Syrian dissidents."

== See also ==
- Syrian civil war
