= Ann Telnaes =

American editorial cartoonist (born 1960)

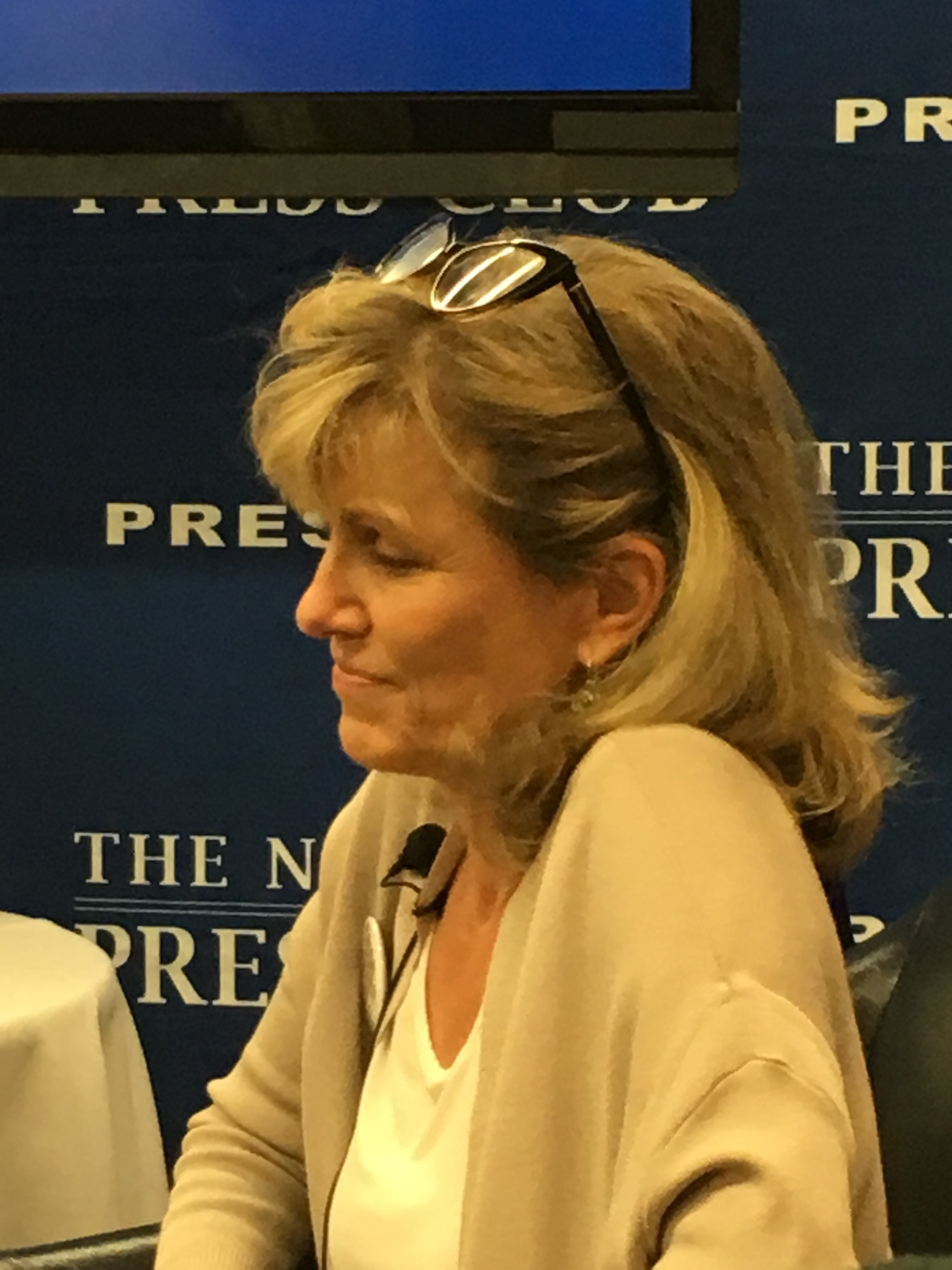
- Telnaes in 2018
- Born: Ann Carolyn Telnaes; November 15, 1960 (age 66) Stockholm, Sweden
- Area: Editorial cartoonist
- Awards: Pulitzer Prize (2001, 2025); Berryman Award (2003); Reuben Award (2016); EWK Prize (2021); Herblock Prize (2023)
- Spouse: David Lloyd

Ann Carolyn Telnaes (/ˈtɛlnəs/; born November 15, 1960) is an American editorial cartoonist. She creates cartoons in forms including animation, visual essays, live sketches, and traditional print. She worked for The Washington Post from 2008 until her resignation on January 3, 2025. She held a solo exhibition at the Great Hall in the Thomas Jefferson Building of the Library of Congress in 2004.

Telnaes was president of the Association of American Editorial Cartoonists during 2016–2017. In 2020, her work was included in the exhibit Women in Comics: Looking Forward, Looking Back at the Society of Illustrators in New York City. She is a member of the advisory board of the Freedom Cartoonists Foundation that is based in Geneva and a former member of the board of directors of Cartoonists Rights Network International. She has won two Pulitzer Prizes.

== Biography ==
Ann Telnaes was born in Stockholm, Sweden, in 1960. She was graduated from Reno High School in Reno, Nevada in 1979. She became a naturalized citizen of the United States in 1973.

Telnaes earned a Bachelor of Fine Arts degree at the California Institute of the Arts in 1985, focusing on character animation. In 2020, she taught the course "Commentary Through Cartoons" as a visiting faculty member at CalArts.

Before becoming an editorial cartoonist, she worked in the animation field and also as a show designer for Walt Disney Imagineering. She contributed to such films as The Brave Little Toaster and The Chipmunk Adventure. As her views became more politicized, her political cartoons were published regularly in the New York Times, Los Angeles Times, Chicago Tribune,Washington Post and other prominent newspapers. In 1993 she relocated to Washington, D.C. Most of her cartoons are considered liberal with emphasis on women's issues including abortion rights, burkas and third-world pregnancy. Her cartoons are syndicated by Tribune Media Services in the United States. From January 2000 until September 2005 she was one of the six female contributors to Six Chix and she also provided a "commentoon" in Women's eNews weekly.

In 2003, while the Massachusetts Supreme Judicial Court was deciding the fate of same-sex marriage Telnaes created an editorial cartoon criticizing the historical imbalance of gender roles in the United States by which "the traditional view of marriage between a man and a woman has resulted in second class citizenship for many people in America for a long time".

Telnaes's 2025 cartoon depicting billionaires and Mickey Mouse performing obeisance before the president-elect that was rejected by the Post opinion editor

Telnaes began working for The Washington Post in 2008. In 2015, a Telnaes cartoon was removed by the Washington Post from the newspaper's website. The cartoon had depicted Ted Cruz as an organ grinder with two monkeys. Telnaes defended her cartoon by tweeting, "Ted Cruz has put his children in a political ad—don't start screaming when editorial cartoonists draw them as well."

In January 2025, Telnaes resigned from The Washington Post after her cartoon lampooning powerful media and technology billionaires and a corporation mascot performing obeisance before president-elect Donald Trump was rejected by opinions editor David Shipley. Included in the sketch were OpenAI CEO Sam Altman, Post owner Jeff Bezos, Meta/Facebook head Mark Zuckerberg offering bags of money, Los Angeles Times publisher Patrick Soon-Shiong, and a prostrate Disney mascot Mickey Mouse (representing Disney subsidiary ABC News). Shipley stated that his editorial decision was based on the piece's redundancy with other content that had recently been published by or been approved for publication in the Post. His refusal to publish the cartoon was decried by the Association of American Editorial Cartoonists as "craven censorship" and "political cowardice". Telnaes responded to the situation with a post to her online newsletter.

== Personal life ==
Telnaes lives in Washington, D.C. She is married to David Lloyd. The Carnegie Corporation of New York honored her with their Great Immigrants Award in 2015. The program honors naturalized U.S. citizens who have made significant contributions to American society, democracy, and cultures.

== Awards ==
Telnaes is the second female cartoonist and one of the few freelancers to win the Pulitzer Prize for Editorial Cartooning. She was the first woman to receive both the Pulitzer Prize for Editorial Cartooning and the Reuben Award.

- 1996
  - Best Cartoonist, The Population Institute XVII Global Media Awards
  - Best Editorial Cartoonist, Sixth Annual Environmental Media Awards
  - Reuben Award (National Cartoonists Society), finalist
- 1997 — National Headliner Award for Editorial Cartoons
- 2001 — Pulitzer Prize for Editorial Cartooning
- 2002 — Maggie Award for Editorial Cartoons, now known as The Planned Parenthood Federation of America (PPFA) Media Excellence Awards
- 2003 — Clifford K. and James T. Berryman Award (National Press Foundation)
- 2011 — Herblock Prize, finalist
- 2015 — Great Immigrants Award from Carnegie Corporation of New York
- 2016 — Reuben Award, winner
- 2021 — EWK Prize, winner
- 2022 — Pulitzer Prize for Illustrated Reporting and Commentary, finalist
- 2023 — Herblock Prize, winner
- 2025 — Pulitzer Prize for Illustrated Reporting and Commentary

== Bibliography ==
- Humor's Edge (Pomegranate Press/Library of Congress, 2004)
- Dick: An Editorial Cartoon Collection (Ann Telnaes, 2006)
- Trump's ABC (Fantagraphics, 2018)
