= Wilma Soss =

Wilma Porter Soss (March 13, 1900 – October 10, 1986) was an American shareholder activist. She worked in public relations before committing to shareholder activism full time in the late 1940s. Soss held stock in over 100 American corporations and regularly attended shareholder meetings for many of those companies, where she advocated for changes such as increased representation of women on their boards of directors. Soss founded and chaired the Federation of Women Shareholders in American Business as part of her advocacy.

Soss's work inspired the Broadway play and 1956 film The Solid Gold Cadillac.

== Early life ==
Wilma Porter was born to Clara née Wiessman and George Edison Porter, possibly on March 13, 1900, (Note: Soss's birth certificate was destroyed in the San Francisco earthquake, and she later stated that she did not "believe in age.") in San Francisco. She later claimed to have been born during an earthquake. Her father worked as a photographer. Her parents were divorced when she was six, and Wilma moved to New York City to live with her grandmother, in Park Slope, Brooklyn. In Brooklyn, she attended the Manual Training High School.

She entered the Columbia School of Journalism in 1919, moonlighting as a reporter at the Brooklyn Times. While at Columbia, Porter met Joseph Soss, whom she married in 1923. Her husband ran an advertising company based in Brooklyn.

Wilma Soss graduated from Columbia in 1925. She worked as a reporter at the Brooklyn Times, writing a column on theater. She soon left the paper to embark on a career in public relations (PR).

== Career ==
=== Public relations ===
Soss's first jobs in the PR field were as an assistant to Florenz Ziegfeld and then the publicist Harry Reichenbach. In the 1930s, she entered into the publicity field on her own, working for clients that included the New York City stores Saks Fifth Avenue, Tailored Women, and Shoecraft. An obituary describes her during this time as having been "the highest-paid publicity woman on Fifth Avenue." She was later employed as publicity director for Alfred Dunhill and the International Silk Guild (the latter from 1934–1941). Beginning in 1941, Soss worked for manufacturers of railroad freight cars in Detroit. She left that industry to work as a PR consultant in manufacturing, for the Budd Company, in 1945.

=== Shareholder activism ===
Following the end of World War II, Soss purchased a share in U.S. Steel. She later reported that she had been interested in working in public relations in the steel industry, so attended a U.S. Steel shareholder meeting to learn more. After going to the meeting, she was "shocked" at how it was run, and resolved to become a shareholder activist full time. In 1947, Soss founded the Federation of Women Shareholders in American Business (FWSAB), and was elected its first president on October 28, 1948. She would continue to be involved with the FWSAB as chair for 39 years.

In the decades that followed, Soss began attending shareholder meetings regularly—by 1971 she claimed to go to around 150 every year and to hold stock in over 100 companies. She became known as a "corporate gadfly", as she tended to hold minimal amounts of stock in the companies that she advocated for changes to. Soss used her attendance at shareholder meetings to advocate for women's "economic suffrage" and often promoted the inclusion of women on governing boards of the companies she was involved in. At other times she challenged corporate leaders as overpaid.

Soss was also known for an "extraordinary" way of dressing. By 1966, Life reported that she brought a megaphone to shareholder meetings in case the microphone she was speaking at got turned off.

In 1954, Soss began a weekly radio show on NBC Radio Network, called "Pocketbook News". Every 10-minute episode discussed economic issues. The show lasted until 1980.

== Death ==
Soss died on October 10, 1986, of a heart attack.

== Legacy ==
Soss was the inspiration for the Broadway play and 1956 film The Solid Gold Cadillac, about a shareholder activist challenging a company's upper management as overpaid.

The historian Robert E. Wright described Soss as "America’s first female financial broadcast journalist of significant tenure and national standing." Wright and Janice Traflet, a professor at Bucknell University, published a biography of Soss in 2022.

Her papers are held by the University of Wyoming's American Heritage Center.

== See also ==
- Evelyn Y. Davis

== Bibliography ==
- Wright, Robert E. (2018-10-01). "Pioneer Financial News: National Broadcast Journalist Wilma Soss, NBC Radio, 1954–1980". Journalism History. 44 (3): 138–149. doi:10.1080/00947679.2018.12059205. ISSN 0094-7679.
- Wright, Robert E. (2021-04-03). "The limits of female policy punditry: The Gendered Misreading of Wilma Soss's Critiques of Nixonomics and Nadernomics". Media History. 27 (2): 237–250. doi:10.1080/13688804.2020.1745626. ISSN 1368-8804.
