= Matt Wuerker =

American political cartoonist

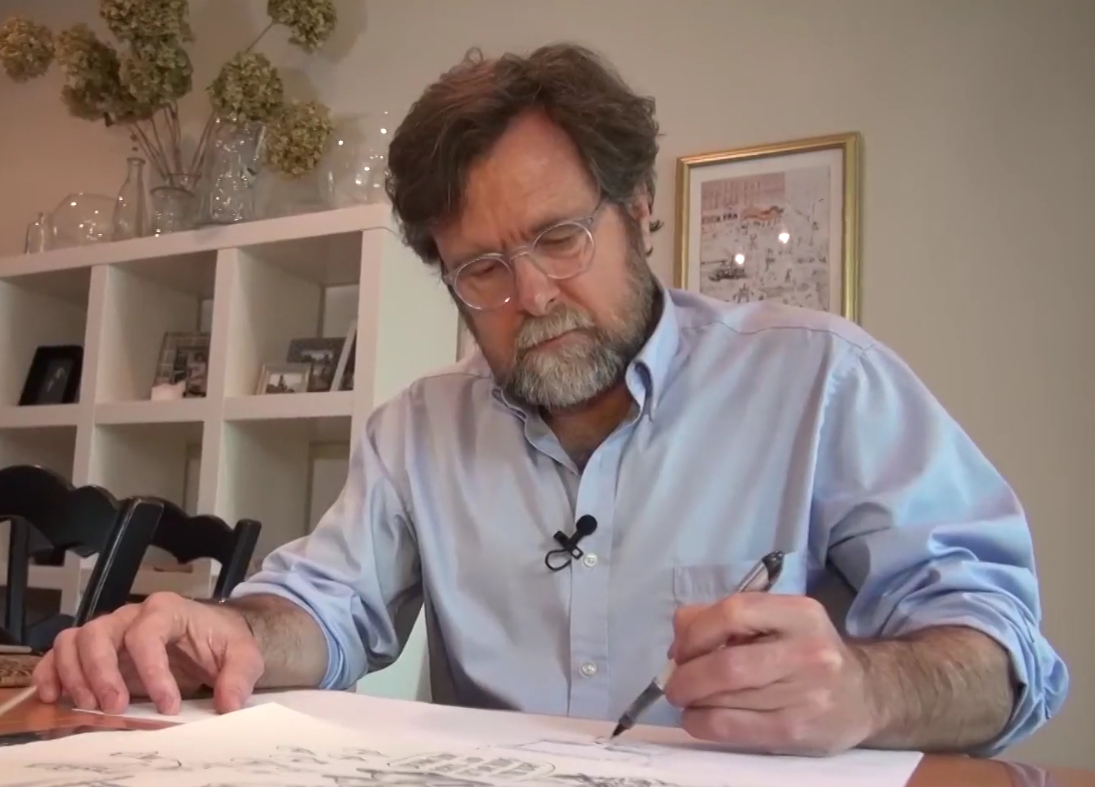
- Education: Lewis & Clark College
- Occupation: Cartoonist
- Awards: Pulitzer Prize for Editorial Cartooning

Matt Wuerker (/ˈwɜːrkər/) is a Pulitzer Prize-winning American political cartoonist and founding staff member of Politico.

== Career ==
Wuerker graduated from Lewis & Clark College with a BA in 1979. While there, he served as the chief editorial cartoonist for The Pioneer Log, the weekly student newspaper.

He has published two collections of cartoons, Standing Tall in Deep Doo Doo, A Cartoon Chronicle of the Bush Quayle Years (Thunder's Mouth Press, 1991) and Meanwhile in Other News... A Graphic Look at Politics in the Empire of Money, Sex and Scandal (Common Courage Press, 1998). He illustrated the book The Madness of King George (Common Courage Press, 2003) by Michael K. Smith.

In August 2017, a cartoon that he drew in response to Hurricane Harvey was criticized for being insensitive to victims of the hurricane. The cartoon depicted a man in a Confederate-flag shirt being winched from a house with a "Secede" sign, as one of the rescuers points out that they had been sent by the government. A tweet from Politico containing the cartoon was later deleted.

== Awards ==
Wuerker was the winner of the 2012 Pulitzer Prize for Editorial Cartooning. He was a finalist for the award in 2009 and 2010. He was awarded the 2010 Herblock Prize (presented at the Library of Congress) and the 2010 Berryman Award by the National Press Foundation.
