= Herblock =

American editorial cartoonist and author (1909–2001)

- Block likely in the 1950s
- Born: Herbert Lawrence Block; October 13, 1909 Chicago, Illinois, United States
- Died: October 7, 2001 (aged 91) Washington, D.C., United States
- Area: Cartoonist
- Pseudonym: Herblock
- Notable works: Editorial cartoons Herblock Prize

Herbert Lawrence Block, commonly known as Herblock (October 13, 1909 – October 7, 2001), was an American editorial cartoonist and author best known for his commentaries on national domestic and foreign policy.

During the course of a career stretching into nine decades, he won three Pulitzer Prizes for editorial cartooning (1942, 1954, and 1979), and shared a fourth in 1973 for Public Service on Watergate. He was awarded the Presidential Medal of Freedom (1994), the National Cartoonist Society Editorial Cartoon Award in 1957 and 1960, the Reuben Award in 1956, the Gold Key Award (the National Cartoonists Society Hall of Fame) in 1979, and numerous other honors.

== Early life and education ==
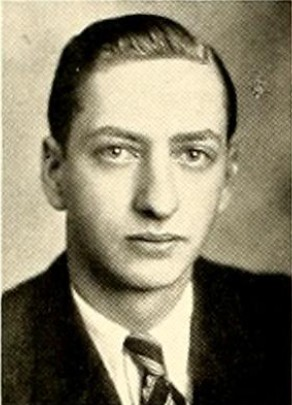
Herbert Block in 1929 Lake Forest College yearbook

Block was the youngest of three boys born in Chicago to a Catholic mother, Theresa Lupe Block, and a father of Jewish descent, David Julian Block, a chemist and electrical engineer.

His brother Rich became president of an industrial laundry, and his brother Bill was a newspaper reporter for the Chicago Tribune and later for the Chicago Sun.

He began taking classes at the Art Institute of Chicago when he was eleven, winning a scholarship there at age 12. He adopted the "Herblock" signature in high school. After graduating in 1927, he attended Lake Forest College for almost two years, where he majored in English and political science.

Herblock said that his family was conservative and that his father voted for Herbert Hoover in 1928.

== Career ==
Late in his second year at Lake Forest College, Herblock was hired ‍—‌ after submitting some cartoons he had done in high school and college for the Evanston News-Index ‍—‌ to replace the Chicago Daily News' departing editorial cartoonist. He never returned to school. His first cartoon for the Daily News (April 24, 1929) advocated conservation of America's forests.

Block moved to Cleveland in 1933 to become the staff cartoonist for Newspaper Enterprise Association, which distributed his cartoons nationally. With the onset of the Great Depression, Block became a supporter of President Franklin D. Roosevelt and the New Deal. In his cartoons, he pointed out the dangers of Soviet aggression, the growing Nazi menace, and opposed American isolationists.

Herblock focused most of his attacks on those public figures in power — often on Republican figures — but Democrats who displeased him were not immune from criticism. As an example: despite being an ardent admirer of Franklin Roosevelt, Herblock found it necessary to attack the president's 1937 court-packing scheme.

He won his first Pulitzer Prize for Editorial Cartooning in 1942 for the cartoon, "British Plane." He then spent two years in the Army doing cartoons and press releases.

Upon discharge in 1946, Block became chief editorial cartoonist for The Washington Post, where he worked until his death 55 years later.

Herblock coined the term "McCarthyism" in this March 29, 1950, cartoon.

While he criticized Stalin and other Communist figures, he also believed that the United States was overreacting to the danger of communism. In the early 1950s, Senator Joseph McCarthy was a recurring target of Herblock's cartoons, one of which (March 29, 1950) introduced the term McCarthyism.

The Washington Post officially endorsed Eisenhower in the 1952 presidential election. Because Herblock supported Adlai Stevenson, the Post pulled his cartoons — but restored them after a week. Herblock always insisted on total editorial independence, regardless of whether or not his cartoons agreed with the Post's stance on political issues. During Eisenhower's administration, Herblock criticized the president mainly for insufficient action on civil rights and for not curbing the abuses of Senator McCarthy. He won a second Pulitzer Prize in 1954.

Another favorite target in the McCarthy era was Richard Nixon — at the time Eisenhower's vice president. Nixon canceled his subscription to the Post after Herblock drew him crawling out of an open sewer in 1954. (He had once used the same motif for Senator McCarthy.) During this era, Herblock's Nixon was characterized by his infamous "five o'clock shadow" beard stubble; shortly after Nixon was elected President in 1968, Herblock published a cartoon of a barbershop with an open chair and the sign, "This establishment offers ONE FREE SHAVE to any new President. H. Block, Proprietor." Block never drew Nixon with stubble again.

In the 1960s, Herblock attacked the US war effort in Vietnam, causing President Johnson to drop his plans of awarding the cartoonist with a Presidential Medal of Freedom. The cartoonist would eventually be awarded this honor by Bill Clinton in 1994.

Herblock's cartoons about the Watergate scandal led to him being put on Nixon's enemies list.

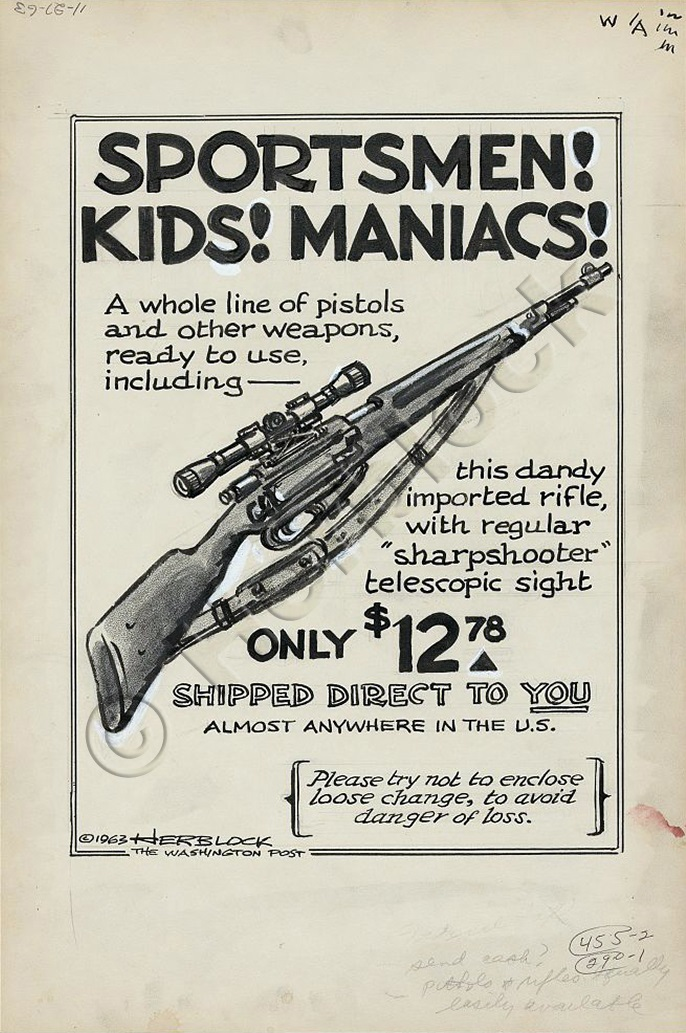
"SPORTSMEN! KIDS! MANIACS!" cartoon about gun owners published by Herblock in 1963 after John F. Kennedy's assassination

Herblock won his third Pulitzer Prize in 1979. In the 1980s and 1990s, he satirized and criticized Presidents Reagan, George H. W. Bush, and Clinton in addition to taking on the issues of the day: gun control; abortion; the influence of fundamentalist Christian groups on public policy; and the dot-com bubble. The tobacco industry was a favorite target of Herblock, who had smoked at one time. He gave it up and had criticized cigarette companies even before that.

Block's cartoons were syndicated to newspapers around the world by Creators Syndicate from 1987 until his death in 2001.

Stating that he never got tired of his work, Herblock continued as the 21st century began by lampooning the newly elected president George W. Bush.

== Personal life and death ==
Herblock never married, and, in the Post's employee index, his address was listed as simply "The Washington Post".

He died on October 7, 2001, after a protracted bout of pneumonia six days short of what would have been his 92nd birthday. His final cartoon appeared in The Washington Post on August 26.

== Honors ==
Herblock won three Pulitzer Prizes for editorial cartooning (1942, 1954, 1979), shared a fourth Pulitzer Prize in 1973 for Public Service on Watergate, the Presidential Medal of Freedom (1994), the National Cartoonist Society Editorial Cartoon Award in 1957 and 1960, the Reuben Award in 1956, and the Gold Key Award (the National Cartoonists Society Hall of Fame) in 1979. In 1986, he received the Elijah Parish Lovejoy Award as well as an honorary Doctor of Laws degree from Colby College, and in 1999 an honorary Doctor of Arts degree from Harvard University.

In 1961, he was chosen as one of 50 outstanding Americans of meritorious performance in the fields of endeavor, to be honored as a Guest of Honor at the first annual Banquet of the Golden Plate in Monterey, California. Honor was awarded by vote of the National Panel of Distinguished Americans of the Academy of Achievement.

In 1966, he was selected to design the U.S. postage stamp commemorating the 175th anniversary of the Bill of Rights.

In 1987 he received the Four Freedoms Award for the Freedom of Speech.

On January 27, 2014, HBO premiered a documentary, Herblock: The Black & The White, which was executive produced by George Stevens Jr., produced and directed by his son, Michael Stevens, who also co-wrote with Sara Lukinson. The documentary interviews Jon Stewart, Lewis Black, Tom Brokaw, Bob Woodward, Carl Bernstein, Jules Feiffer, Ted Koppel and Ben Bradlee as witnesses to Block's life, work and indelible contribution to American satire.

== Legacy: the Herb Block Foundation ==
When Herb Block died in October 2001, he left $50 million with instructions to create a foundation to support charitable and educational programs that help promote and sustain the causes he championed during his 72 years of cartooning. The Herb Block Foundation awarded its first grants and the annual Herblock Prize in editorial cartooning in 2004. According to its website, the Herb Block Foundation "is committed to defending the basic freedoms guaranteed all Americans, combating all forms of discrimination and prejudice and improving the conditions of the poor and underprivileged through the creation or support of charitable and educational programs with the same goals. The Foundation is also committed to improving educational opportunities to deserving students through post-secondary education scholarships and to promoting editorial cartooning through continuing research."

== Exhibitions ==
Herblock's first major solo exhibition was in 1950 at the Corcoran Gallery of Art, which displayed about 200 of his drawings. In 2008 Herblock's work was the subject of exhibitions entitled Herblock's Presidents at the Smithsonian Institution's National Portrait Gallery (United States), and Herblock's History at the Library of Congress. In late 2009 and early 2010, the Library of Congress showcased a new exhibition called Herblock!. This exhibition included cartoons that represented Block's ability to wield his pen effectively and artfully. He used it to condemn corruption and expose injustice, inequality, and immorality. His topics included the Great Depression; the rise of fascism and World War II; communism and the Cold War; Senator Joseph McCarthy; race relations; Richard Nixon; the Reagan era; the 2000 election and more.

== Books of collected cartoons by Herbert Block ==
External videos
- Booknotes interview with Herblock on A Cartoonist's Life, November 14, 1993, C-SPAN

- Block, Herbert. Herblock: The Life and Works of the Great Political Cartoonist ed. by Harry Katz (W. W. Norton, 2009), 304pp; prints more than two hundred fifty cartoons in the text; comes with a DVD containing more than 18,000 Herblock cartoons
- Herblock's History: Political Cartoons from the Crash to the Millennium (Library of Congress, 2000)
- Herblock: A Cartoonist's Life (Maxwell Macmillan International, 1993)
- Herblock at Large: "Let's Go Back a Little ..." and Other Cartoons with Commentary (Pantheon Books, 1987)
- Herblock Through the Looking Glass (Norton, 1984)
- Herblock on All Fronts: Text and Cartoons (New American Library, 1980)
- Herblock Special Report (Norton, 1974)
- Herblock's State of the Union (Simon & Schuster, 1972)
- The Herblock Gallery (Simon & Schuster, 1968)
- Straight Herblock (Simon & Schuster, 1964)
- Herblock's Special for Today (Simon & Schuster, 1958)
- Herblock's Here and Now (Simon & Schuster, 1955)
- The Herblock Book (The Beacon Press, 1952)
- Herblock Looks at Communism (Simon & Schuster, 1950)
