= John Sherffius =

American cartoonist

- Education: University of California, Los Angeles
- Occupation: Cartoonist
- Children: 3
- Awards: Herblock Prize (2008)

John Sherffius works as a freelance artist. He currently leads a happy life in Massachusetts with his dog, wife, and three kids.

He graduated from the University of California, Los Angeles. His cartoons have appeared in The Daily Bruin, the Ventura County Star, The St. Louis Post-Dispatch, and The Kansas City Star. He appears on Cagle.com and Creator's Syndicate. He is a member of The Association of American Editorial Cartoonists.

== Awards ==
- 2008 Herblock Award
- 2001 Scripps Howard Foundation, National Jo
