= Rogue State: A Guide to the World's Only Superpower =

Book by William Blum

- Author: William Blum
- Language: English
- Genre: Politics
- Publisher: Common Courage Press (US); Zed Books Ltd. (UK)
- Publication date: 2000
- Publication place: United States
- Media type: Print (Hardcover, Paperback)
- Pages: 394
- ISBN: 1-56751-374-3
- OCLC: 62712660
- Preceded by: The CIA: A Forgotten History (1986)
- Followed by: West-Bloc Dissident: A Cold War Memoir (2002)

Rogue State: A Guide to the World's Only Superpower (ISBN 1-56751-374-3) is a book by William Blum first published in 2000. The 3rd revision updates events covered in the book to the year 2005. It examines and criticizes United States foreign policy during and following the Cold War. The book's first chapter is titled "Why Do Terrorists Keep Picking on the United States". Subsequent chapter titles include "America's Gift to the World – the Afghan Terrorist Alumni", "The U.S. Versus the World at the United Nations" and "How the CIA Sent Nelson Mandela to Prison for 28 Years". The book was published in several languages including Arabic.

== Chapters ==
Ours and Theirs: Washington's Love/Hate Relationship with Terrorists and Human-Rights Violators

1. Why Do Terrorists Keep Picking on the United States?
2. America's Gift to the World—the Afghan Terrorist Alumni
3. Assassinations
4. Excerpts from US Army and CIA Training Manuals
5. Torture
6. The Unsavories
7. Training New Unsavories
8. War Criminals: Theirs and Ours
9. Haven for Terrorists
10. Supporting Pol Pot

United States Use of Weapons of Mass Destruction

1. Bombings
2. Depleted Uranium
3. Cluster Bombs
4. United States Use of Chemical and Biological Weapons Abroad
5. United States Use of Chemical and Biological Weapons at Home
6. Encouragement of the Use of CBW by Other Nations

A Rogue State versus the World

1. A Concise History of United States Global Interventions, 1945 to the Present
2. Perverting Elections
3. Trojan Horse: The National Endowment for Democracy
4. The US versus the World at the United Nations
5. Eavesdropping on the Planet
6. Kidnapping and Looting
7. How the CIA Sent Nelson Mandela to Prison for 28 Years
8. The CIA and Drugs: Just Say "Why Not?"
9. Being the World's Only Superpower Means Never Having to Say You're Sorry
10. The United States Invades, Bombs and Kills for It...but Do Americans Really Believe in Free Enterprise?
11. A Day in the Life of a Free Country

== Endorsement by Osama bin Laden ==
Rogue State received notoriety when it was mentioned in a speech attributed to Osama bin Laden broadcast on January 19, 2006. Bin Laden stated: "If Bush carries on with his lies and oppression, it would be useful for you to read the book The Rogue State". Sales subsequently soared.

When asked if he was disturbed by bin Laden's endorsement of his book, Blum replied "I was glad. I knew it would help the book's sales and I was not bothered by who it was coming from. If he shares with me a deep dislike for the certain aspects of U.S. foreign policy, then I'm not going to spurn any endorsement of the book by him. I think it's good that he shares those views and I'm not turned off by that." Prior to bin Laden's statement, the book was ranked at 209,000 on Amazon's sales list. By the following Sunday it was number 12.

According to the Associated Press, Bin Laden quoted the following passage by Blum: "If I were president, I could stop terrorist attacks against the United States in a few days. Permanently. I would first apologize – very publicly and sincerely – to all the widows and orphans, the impoverished and the tortured, and the many millions of other victims of American imperialism. Then I would announce to every corner of the world that America's global military interventions have come to an end." The quote is from Blum's 2004 book Freeing the World to Death: Essays on the American Empire, but appears in the Zed Books edition of Rogue State.

== Other editions ==
- Blum, William (2006). Rogue State: A Guide to the World's Only Superpower. Zed Books Ltd. ISBN 1-84277-827-7.

== See also ==
- Killing Hope
- Rogue state
- American Empire
