= William Blum =

American writer, critic, and socialist (1933–2018)

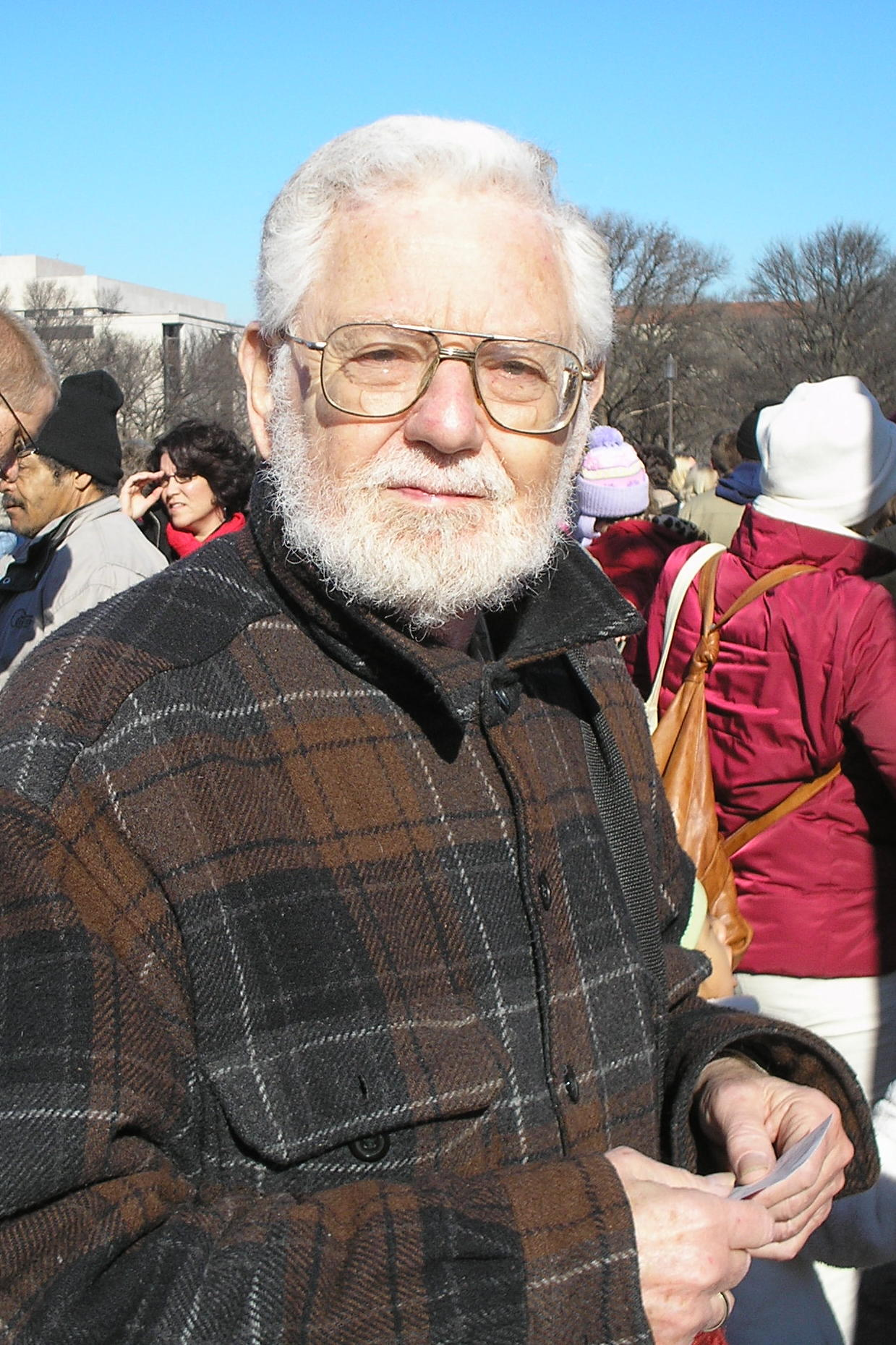
- Blum in 2007
- Born: William Henry Blum; March 6, 1933; Brooklyn, New York, U.S.
- Died: December 9, 2018 (aged 85); Arlington, Virginia, U.S.
- Occupations: Journalist, author, U.S. foreign policy critic
- Writing career
- Genres: Political journalism, history
- Notable works: The CIA: A Forgotten History (1986); Rogue State (2000); Killing Hope (2003)
- Website: williamblum.org

William Henry Blum (/bluːm/; March 6, 1933 – December 9, 2018) was an American author and journalist and a critic of United States foreign policy.

== Early life ==
Blum was born at Beth Moses Hospital (now part of Maimonides Medical Center) in Brooklyn, to Ruth (née Katz) and Isidore Blum, who were Polish Jewish immigrants. His father was a machinist. He was a graduate of Erasmus Hall High School and gained a degree in accountancy in 1955 from the City College School of Business and Civic Administration, which later became Baruch College of the City University of New York. Blum worked as a computer programmer for IBM and later the U.S. State Department. He had the ambition of becoming a foreign service officer to, as he explained, "take part in the great anti-Communist crusade" but was later disillusioned by the Vietnam War. Blum became involved in anti–Vietnam War activism and was pressured to resign his government post in 1967. By then he had already taken part in anti-war protests and become a founder and editor of the Washington Free Press, an alternative bi-weekly newspaper.

== Journalism ==
Blum worked as freelance journalist in the United States, Europe and South America. In 1972–1973, Blum worked as a journalist in Chile where he reported on the Allende government's "socialist experiment" before the U.S backed coup and the regime of Augusto Pinochet. In the mid-1970s, he worked in London with ex-CIA officer Philip Agee and his associates "on their project of exposing CIA personnel and their misdeeds". He supported himself with his writing and speaking engagements on college campuses. One of Blum's stories on Iraq was listed by Project Censored as one of "The Top Ten Censored Stories of 1998".

In his books and online columns, Blum devoted substantial attention to CIA interventions and assassination plots. Noam Chomsky has called Blum's book Killing Hope: U.S. Military and CIA Interventions Since World War II, "far and away the best book on the topic." Blum supported Ralph Nader's presidential campaigns. He circulated a monthly newsletter by email called "The Anti-Empire Report". Blum described his life's mission as: "If not ending, at least slowing down the American Empire. At least injuring the beast. It's causing so much suffering around the world."

In an interview with C-SPAN in 2006, Blum stated: "Speaking about U.S. foreign policy, which is my specialty, the authors I would most recommend would be Michael Parenti and Noam Chomsky and Edward Herman and Howard Zinn and Alexander Cockburn." According to Blum, left-wing publications such as The Nation declined to publish his work because they considered him too much of a fanatic. Blum was a member of the International Committee to Defend Slobodan Milosevic, and wrote in Rogue State: A Guide to the World's Only Superpower that the ethnic cleasing of Kosovo Albanians had begun after the NATO bombing of Yugoslavia rather than before it. Roger Lippman wrote that this was incorrect because the reporting of massacres and ethnic cleansing of Albanians had begun in a year earlier in 1998.

=== Osama bin Laden statement ===
In early 2006, Blum briefly became the subject of widespread media attention when Osama bin Laden issued a public statement in which he quoted Blum and recommended that all Americans read Rogue State: A Guide to the World's Only Superpower. As a result of the mention, sales of his book greatly increased. "I was quite surprised and even shocked and amused when I found out what he'd said," Blum commented. "I was glad. I knew it would help the book's sales and I was not bothered by who it was coming from. If he shares with me a deep dislike for certain aspects of US foreign policy, then I'm not going to spurn any endorsement of the book by him. I think it's good that he shares those views and I'm not turned off by that." On the Bin Laden endorsement, Blum stated, "This is almost as good as being an Oprah book." In an interview on MSNBC Countdown, he said: "Basically it's US foreign policy which creates anti-American terrorists. It's the things we do to the world. It's not, as the White House tells us, that they hate our freedom and democracy. That's just propaganda."

In a May 22, 2006, article entitled "Come Out of the White House With Your Hands Up", Blum wrote: "Since the bin Laden recommendation, January 19, I have not been offered a single speaking engagement on any campus. . . . This despite January–May normally being the most active period for me and other campus speakers."

== Death ==
Blum died on December 9, 2018, in Arlington, Virginia, from kidney failure at the age of 85 following a fall in his apartment two months earlier.

== Works ==
Articles

- (DV) Blum: "Come Out of the White House With Your Hands Up!" Dissident Voice (May 22, 2006).
- "Hit List." CovertAction Information Bulletin (Fall 1993), p. 9.
- "The Painful Truths Told by Phil Agee." Consortium News (Jun. 27, 2013).

Books

- The CIA: A Forgotten History. Zed Books (1986). ISBN 0-86232-480-7.
- Killing Hope: U.S. Military and CIA Interventions Since World War II. Common Courage Press (1995). ISBN 1-56751-052-3.
  - UK edition. Zed Books (2003). Revised in 2014. ISBN 978-1783601776.
  - 2nd edition, updated. Common Courage Press (2004). ISBN 1-56751-252-6. ISBN 1-56751-253-4.
- Rogue State: A Guide to the World's Only Superpower. Common Courage Press (2000). ISBN 1-56751-194-5.
  - Full text available.
- West-Bloc Dissident: A Cold War Memoir. Soft Skull Press (2002). ISBN 1-56751-306-9.
- Freeing the World to Death: Essays on the American Empire. Common Courage Press (2004). ISBN 1567513069.
- America's Deadliest Export: Democracy - The Truth About US Foreign Policy and Everything Else. Zed Books (2013). ISBN 1-78032-445-6.
