= Marcia Esparza =

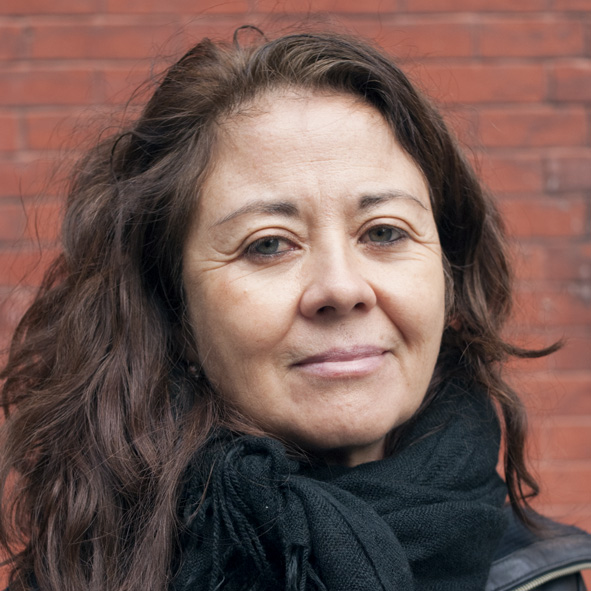
Dr. Marcia Esparza

Dr. Marcia Esparza is a professor of sociology at John Jay College of Criminal Justice. She is known for her research on state violence, genocide, and collective memory-silence that are the product of mass killings. She is the founder of Historical Memory Project, HMP and the author of Silenced Communities: Legacies Resistance to Militarization and Militarism in a Guatemalan Rural Town, 2017 (Berghahn Books).

Esparza formed part of the United Nations’ Historical Clarification Commission in war-ridden Guatemala (1997–1999), interviewing war and genocide survivors. In 2002 she founded the HMP to preserve the collective memory of war, genocide and state violence and to promote critical awareness of their long-term consequences in Latin America within the Latinx diaspora in New York City. She collects local archives recording human rights atrocities in the region in an attempt to preserve historical memory of state violence. Esparza has also appeared on talk shows such as Democracy Now! and Aljazeera to talk about her scholarly works and HMP mission in documenting the extinction and genocide of the indigenous population of Latin America. At CUNY and throughout NYC she has held public and cultural events commemorating and raising awareness of human rights crimes as seen in Rebel Memory #1 which touches upon the missing 43 Mexican students of the Ayotzinapa school.

Esparza takes an interdisciplinary approach that includes Museum Studies, Studies of Indigenous Peoples, Poverty Studies, War Studies, Postcolonial Studies, Central and Latin American Studies, and Human Rights Studies. Her current book project focuses on collective military memory through the lens of military museums, particularly in Mallorca, Spain.

== Historical Memory Project ==
Dr. Marcia Esparza developed the Historical Memory Project influenced by her field research experiences with the United Nations’ Historical Clarification Commission, or Truth Commission, from 1997 to 1999, which uncovered war atrocities against the rural Mayan population of Guatemala. To continue revealing state crimes, war, and genocides against indigenous people, Afro-descendants, workers, students, and peasants, Dr. Esparza established HMP at John Jay College of Criminal Justice, City University of New York (CUNY), a public institution serving the children and grandchildren of immigrants, many of whom have vicarious or direct experiences with the realities of state violence, war, and genocide; nearly 40% of John Jay's student body is of Latino descent.

== Awards and honors ==
She is the recipient of the National Endowment for the Humanities Fellowship for Hispanic Serving Institution and Mellon Foundation fellow at CUNY graduate Center, addressing a seminar topic of "Poverty." In February 2013, she organized as part of the seminar a panel titled "Poverty and the Humanities: War, Violence, and Militarization," which included speakers Cynthia Enloe and David Brotherton. The committee made connections between the inner city's supposed "gang" culture, the militarization of post-Cold War nation-states, and post-independence civil wars in Central America.

In 2014, she was awarded a Senior Fellowship of the Zukunftskollegs at the University of Konstanz.

== Education ==
She got her baccalaureate at Hunter College (CUNY) and her doctoral degree in sociology at the University of Albany (SUNY).

== Publications ==
Dr. Marcia Esparza has written and co edited a series of book texts such as:

- S State Violence and Genocide in Latin America: The Cold War Years, 2010, (London: Routledge).
- Justice and Legacies of State Violence in Latin America: A “Double-Edged Sword” Paradigm?”, 2015, (NYC: Lexington Books).
- the Rescuers of Victims of Human Rights Crimes in Latin America, 2016, (NYC: Lexington Books).
- Communities: Legacies Resistance to Militarization and Militarism in a Guatemalan Rural Town, 2017, (Bergham Books).
