= Evelyn Y. Davis =

American activist shareholder (1929–2018)

- Born: Evelyn Yvonne De Jong; August 16, 1929; Amsterdam, Netherlands
- Died: November 4, 2018 (aged 89); Washington, D.C., U.S.
- Burial place: Rock Creek Cemetery
- Education: Western Maryland College; George Washington University
- Known for: Shareholder activism

Evelyn Yvonne Davis (August 16, 1929 – November 4, 2018) was an American activist shareholder known for her unconventional approach to corporate governance. She owned stock in a wide number of companies, and published an annual newsletter focusing on the business world, Highlights and Lowlights. Davis became notorious for her attendance at annual corporate meetings, where she was a "corporate gadfly" who would pressure top leadership of corporations and otherwise attempt to gain attention.

Born into a wealthy family in Amsterdam, Davis survived the Holocaust and relocated to the United States after World War II, settling in Catonsville, Maryland. She purchased stock in a large number of companies beginning in the 1950s. She quickly developed a reputation for antagonizing CEOs and making unexpected comments at shareholder meetings. Davis also advocated for more substantive changes including term limiting board members, banning greenmailing, and transparency in corporate political contributions. Though her many proposed shareholder resolutions advancing these goals were rarely successful, a 2017 analysis credited her with increasing the say that individual shareholders had in how corporations were run. Unfazed by controversy, Davis unashamedly sought media coverage for her actions and was a polarizing figure at shareholder meetings.

== Early life ==
Evelyn Yvonne De Jong (Note: In 1990, she claimed her middle name did not stand for anything.) was born on August 16, 1929, in Amsterdam, to Herman H. De Jong, a neurologist, and Marianna De Jong, a psychologist. Her family was wealthy, and she grew up in a 12-room house with her parents and an older brother. During World War II, Evelyn, her mother, and older brother were forcibly taken to Nazi concentration camps at Barneveld and Westerbork and then to Theresienstadt in Czechoslovakia because of their Jewish heritage. (Note: Her father was in the US giving lectures.) Although Davis was reluctant to discuss her experiences during the war, she recounted being beaten by a Nazi guard, scarred after being cut on the calf by shrapnel, forced to pick potatoes at a concentration camp in the Netherlands and cut mica while in Czechoslovakia. She attributed her experiences in the Holocaust with instilling in her an "infatuation" with authority and making it "difficult to lead a normal life."

After they were released, she moved with her brother to live in Catonsville, Maryland, with her father (their parents had divorced), in 1942. After graduating from the Catonsville High School in 1947, she attended Western Maryland College and George Washington University, studying business administration. De Jong did not graduate from either institution. She found employment as a stenographer after leaving college.

== Career ==
The first stock she purchased was in Safeway Stores in 1954, but De Jong got her start in owning large amounts of stocks through an inheritance from her father, who died in 1956. That year she moved to New York City. In 1957, she married her first husband, William Henry Davis III, whose last name she used for the rest of her life. Their divorce shortly afterward gave her more money in the settlement.

=== Highlights and Lowlights ===
Davis published an annual newsletter titled Highlights and Lowlights, which included a range of corporate news, gossip, and her personal opinions. These often included commentary on how she was treated at different stockholder meetings and covered in the press. The first issue was published in 1965. Copies began at a price of around $20, cost $69 in 1978, $120 in 1985, $260 in 1990, $600 in 2012, and were only sent to high-profile businessmen. By 1990 she claimed to be earning a yearly income of $250,000 from subscriptions. Six years later that figure had risen to $600,000. In 2010, Goldman Sachs cancelled their subscription after Davis attacked board member Stephen Friedman.

While Davis maintained that she sold subscriptions because of her savvy analysis, others, such as fellow shareholder activist John J. Gilbert, attributed the success of the newsletter to CEOs who hoped to stay in her good graces. Vanity Fair noted that it was "widely regarded as a vanity publication".

Through the newsletter she held a press pass for the White House. Larry Speakes wrote in his memoirs that while working in the Reagan administration, he would sit Davis in the back of the room because she was a "pest". Speakes also recounted seating her behind plants at a conference Ronald Reagan gave and pointing her out to Reagan so he could avoid calling on her. Reagan still did: Speakes wrote that he later stated "I know I made a mistake [calling on her], but she just jumped out from behind those potted flowers." Later press secretary Marlin Fitzwater would call on Davis when he wanted to change the subject, favorably receiving her business questions. After not being invited to a press conference with Mikhail Gorbachev in 1987, she reached out to his press secretary for foreign affairs, Gennadi Gerasimov, to complain. Gerasimov and Davis became close friends.

=== Shareholdings ===
Davis was frequently referred to in the media as a "corporate gadfly." She held stock in many major corporations, but only small numbers of shares of any specific company—though always enough to submit shareholder resolutions. Despite her relatively small holdings, Davis became known for attending numerous annual general meetings, generally during the spring, and developed a reputation for antagonizing the top leadership of the company. The Los Angeles Times wrote that it seemed the main reason she purchased stock was to attend the meetings. In 1995 she noted that she only dealt with top corporate leadership, saying "I'm not gonna deal with nothings and nobodies, not me, Evelyn Y. Davis."

Because she held stock in so many companies, she could only attend a portion of annual meetings, and chose those which had seemed the most relevant in the preceding year. She told The Journal-Herald in 1979 that another factor was that she would only go while companies were "nasty" to her: "when they get nice I stop going." Davis deliberately sought media coverage for her actions, and would ask local papers why they did not cover her if she was covered in a national paper. She also criticized the publishers of The Washington Post and USA Today at corporate meetings for not sufficiently covering her.

Although she received substantial coverage for her handling of her stocks, most of Davis's net worth was held in bonds and the money market.

Comments at shareholder meetings that attracted publicity included criticizing the beard of Henry Ford II, of Ford Motor Company, recommending that Lee Iacocca change his diet, and calling Frank Blake a "phony". Oftentimes she brought up things that had caused her personal inconvenience, such as asking Procter & Gamble about the size of soap bars in their bathrooms, or criticizing a malfunctioning smoke detector in a hotel operated by ITT Inc. Davis also nominated unexpected figures to serve on the board of companies that she held stock in, including Koo Stark for the board of ITT (claiming her "royal connections" would prove beneficial), Hank Aaron to the board of United Airlines, and Ralph Nader to the board of GM. She also carefully followed corporate news, and often asked pointed questions.

=== Attendance at annual meetings ===
The first time Davis spoke at a shareholder meeting was at IBM's in 1959. She later described being very nervous. Afterwards, she took a public speaking course, through the YMCA, which helped her gain confidence. Around this time Davis took a course through the New York Institute of Finance in securities analysis. In 1963 she was arrested for attempted prostitution, charges which attracted much attention but she later denied as "a corporate frameup" in retaliation for her activism as a shareholder. That year, IBM assigned a bodyguard to Davis at their meeting.

By 1967 she held stock in around 60 companies. Davis also attracted attention for the outfits she wore to shareholder meetings, which included a Batman mask at the 1966 American Broadcasting Company meeting, an aluminum dress to the 1968 U.S. Steel meeting, a swimsuit at the 1970 GM meeting, and a hard hat at an AT&T meeting in the 1970s. She was knocked to the ground by another stockholder at a 1977 meeting of Eastern Airways. After getting five stitches, she attended a meeting of The New York Times Company an hour later. In 1979, she held stock in 132 companies, and the year prior she was averaging 70 annual meetings a year.

In 1983, Phil Caldwell, chairman of Ford, personally handed Davis keys to a new car that she bought in a public ceremony. She had initially requested that Chrysler do this, but they refused so she canceled her order. In 1985 she held stock in around 135 companies. A decade later, a reporter for Knight Ridder estimated that Davis had slowed down somewhat, putting her annual meeting attendance at 30-40 of the 120 companies she held stock in. At the 1995 meeting of CBS, after praising an expected acquisition by Westinghouse Electric Corporation as liberation "from the Tisch regime,” company chairman Laurence Tisch told her to “Sit down or be thrown out.” The following year, Ted Turner of Turner Broadcasting System issued a similar threat. In 2002 the value of her stock holdings were estimated to be $1.5 million. William Clay Ford Jr. of Ford delivered her a new car in 2003.

Davis continued to attend shareholder meetings regularly until 2012, when, at the age of 82, she said that she was too old to continue. Publication of "Highlights and Lowlights" had ceased the year before. Several CEOs commented that shareholder meetings were less eventful without her there.

=== Impact and philosophy ===
Davis became notorious for her outspoken manner: in 1996, People described her as "the nation’s most obstreperous corporate gadfly," and Vanity Fair wrote in 2002 that she was "arguably the most famous and least loved shareholder activist in the country." The 2007 book Corporate Governance deemed her "perhaps the most well-known" individual shareholder activist.

Davis was a prolific proposer of shareholder resolutions in the corporations she held stock in. An analysis from 1987 to 1994 found that she was responsible for 15% of shareholder resolutions submitted in the United States. A 2017 case study of her activism estimated that she proposed resolutions at around forty companies a year. Her proposed resolutions were often met with rejection, and averaged 16% support. 15% were supported by more than half of shareholders, and just 7.5% were accepted by the companies. Yet these success rates were not significantly different from overall rates.

She regularly pressed for lower pay for executives, board members to be term-limited, companies to be transparent about political contributions, and requiring the election of accountants. Her obituary in The New York Times credited this advocacy as "helping to advance stricter rules for corporate governance." The corporate scholar Graeme Guthrie credited Davis's work with giving shareholders a say, even if her proposals did not always get implemented.

Davis stated that she "did not believe" in women holding corporate positions of power, saying that "men are more objective; I'd much rather deal with them than a bunch of jealous bitches." On another occasion, she said she felt able to manipulate men and not women, and another time said she disliked women who she felt were "jealous" that she was "famous and glamorous" and had a "little more than they've got." Davis often implied that male CEOs were enamored with her.

She convinced GM to phase out greenmailing in 1990, after four years of lobbying. Bristol Myers Squibb credited Davis with pushing them to require yearly elections of board members. In 2005, six companies, including Macy's, shortened the term for board members from three years to one, a change Davis had been pushing for since 1988. In 2005, The Atlanta Constitution reported that many of the issues which Davis advocating for were finding increasing support among other shareholders. Besides her focus on shareholder rights, she did not have clearly defined political aims, considering the primary function of a company to make money.

She claimed at times that she spoke up so frequently to represent "the little guy," while at other times noting that she wanted attention. Though some found her comments irritating, and at times she was removed from the room, Davis felt her confrontational manner benefitted all shareholders, noting that she asked questions nobody else did, and added that she did not care what others thought. On another occasion she said that "I don't need a psychiatrist to tell me... I'm compensating... I'm a power hungry individual. Power is better than love. Love has only been disappointing."

== Personal life ==
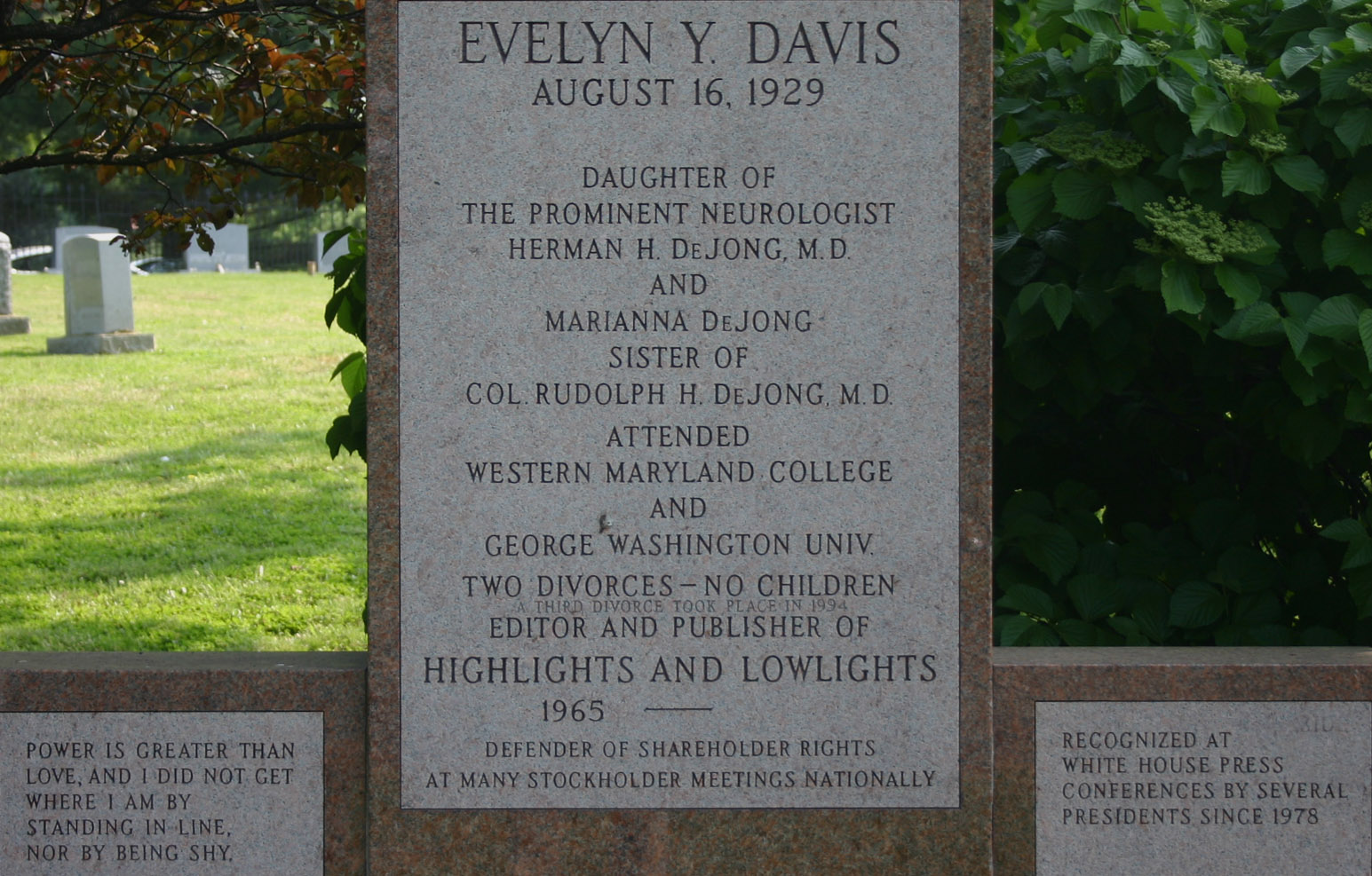
Davis's gravestone at Rock Creek Cemetery in 2005

Davis was married and divorced four times. She lived in New York City, and later moved to Washington, D.C., in the 1980s. By 1990 she lived in an apartment at the Watergate complex. She spoke English, Dutch, French, and German. She had no children, but said that "[m]y stocks are my children." Davis had three facelifts over the course of her life, in 1984, 1989, and 2001. She attributed this to a need to look good at shareholder meetings.

Davis founded the Evelyn Y. Davis Foundation in 1993 to distribute her money. The intention of the foundation was primarily to fund scholarships for studying journalism. Upon her death it had assets of approximately $11 million. Davis generally required that places where she made donations place a plaque in her memory, and instructed the executors of her estate to ensure that the plaques were well-kept and not replaced.

Shortly before her death, Davis entered an assisted living facility. She died on November 4, 2018, at the MedStar Washington Hospital Center. She was buried in Rock Creek Cemetery, with a tombstone that she had placed in 1987 and updated as necessary since then. Her tombstone reads "Power is greater than love, and I did not get where I am by standing in line, nor by being shy."

== See also ==
- Wilma Soss

== Bibliography ==
- Guthrie, Graeme (2017). "A gadfly in the ointment: The Consequences of Separating Ownership and Control". The Firm Divided: Manager-Shareholder Conflict and the Fight for Control of the Modern Corporation. Oxford University Press. pp. 3–13. ISBN 978-0-19-064119-1.
- Kastiel, Kobi; Nili, Yaron (2020). "The Giant Shadow of Corporate Gadflies" (PDF). Securities and Exchanges Commission.
- Kim, Kenneth A. (2007). Corporate Governance. Pearson/Prentice Hall. ISBN 978-0-13-173534-7.
- Speakes, Larry (1988). Speaking out : the Reagan presidency from inside the White House. with Robert Pack. Scribner. ISBN 978-0-684-18929-1.
