= Robert Kirby (humor columnist) =

American writer (born 1953)

Robert Kirby (born 1953 in California) is an American writer. He was a columnist for the Salt Lake Tribune from 1994 until 2021, focusing on the quirks of Utah and Mormon culture.

== Biography ==
Kirby was born into a military family. in Barstow, California. He served as a missionary for the Church of Jesus Christ of Latter-day Saints (LDS Church) in Uruguay, where he met his future wife. On his return from Uruguay, he was hired as a police officer with the Grantsville Police Department, and later the Springville Police Department (1979).

Kirby began writing columns for the local newspapers the Springville Daily Herald and Utah County Journal under the pseudonym Officer John "Blitz" Kreeg

In 1989, Kirby quit the police force to write full-time. The Salt Lake Tribune has published his column since 1994. Kirby won the 2007 Utah Headliners Award for the Opinion Column category.

In September 2018, Kirby was suspended from the Salt Lake Tribune for three months without pay, following an internal investigation into a social media allegations by Courtney Kendrick, a Provo-based blogger (and occasional columnist at the Tribune's rival, the LDS Church-owned Deseret News) of inappropriate behavior toward her at a Mormon conference in July. Kendrick, then 41, wrote she felt "belittled and embarrassed" after Kirby, 65, made sexually tinged comments and persuaded her to eat an edible dose of marijuana, then mocked her before a Sunstone Symposium audience by declaring Kendrick was "high." Kirby issued a written apology stating he was "sorry that my actions have offended people" and acknowledged that there was some truth to the allegations. Subsequent statements carried a fuller acknowledgement of his responsibility and his understanding of the harmful nature, however initially unintended, of his words and actions: In his own written statement, Kirby said: “I’m profoundly sorry that my actions have offended people in the community. I have a lot of work to do in understanding the pain I have caused. “After discussing my conduct with Tribune management,” he continued, “I am more aware of the consequences of my actions and I will be undergoing training and counseling to become a better person.”

Kirby retired from the Tribune in 2021.

== Writing style ==
Kirby, who is active in the LDS Church, often writes about its teachings and how its members interpret those teachings in their daily lives. Since many of the Salt Lake Tribune's readers are non-Mormon, Kirby attempts to explain (usually in a humorous way) the Mormon way of thinking to outsiders. At one time he referred to himself as an "OxyMormon". This approach either alienates those Latter-day Saints who feel their beliefs should not be satirized, or endears itself to the reader. Despite this discordant reception, Kirby was once quoted favorably in the LDS Church's bi-annual General Conference.

== Personal ==
As of 2017, Kirby lives in Herriman, Utah. He and his wife have three daughters and nine grandchildren.

== Published books ==
Novels:

- Brigham's Bees (1991)
- Dark Angel (2000)

Humor:

- Happy Valley Patrol (1993)
- Sunday of the Living Dead (1995)
- Wake Me for the Resurrection (1996)
- Pat & Kirby go to Hell (or heck if you have the sticker edition) (1997)
- Family Home Screaming (1999)
- Kirby Soup for the Soul (White Horse Book, 2003)

Non-fiction:

- END OF WATCH: Utah's Murdered Police Officers, 1853-2003 (University of Utah Press, February 2004)
