= Common Courage Press =

American publisher

- Founded: 1991
- Headquarters location: 121 Red Barn Road, Monroe, Maine 04951
- Official website: www.commoncouragepress.com

Common Courage Press is a book publishing company based in Monroe, Maine. It is a small press publishing company and focuses on books based around social justice, with a leftist point of view.

The company was formed in 1991 by Greg Bates and his wife Flic Shooter. Its first book was one criticizing the Gulf War, Mobilizing Democracy: Changing The U.S. Role in the Middle East. It published books by Noam Chomsky. They published 10 to 12 books a year on average, and by 1998 had published 57 books.

Ralph Nader praised Common Courage Press in 1997, proclaiming it "exists because too often the major publishers of books do not have common courage or have convinced themselves that 'courageous' books don't sell."

== Selected publications ==
- Blum, William. Killing Hope: U.S. Military and CIA Interventions Since World War II. Common Courage Press, 1995. ISBN 1-56751-052-3
  - 2nd edition, updated. Common Courage Press, 2004. ISBN 1-56751-252-6, ISBN 1-56751-253-4
- Blum, William. Rogue State: A Guide to the World's Only Superpower. Common Courage Press, 2000. ISBN 1-56751-194-5
- Blum, William. Freeing the World to Death: Essays on the American Empire. Common Courage Press, 2004.
