= John Fischetti =

American cartoonist (1916–1980)

- Born: September 27, 1916 Brooklyn, New York, United States
- Died: November 18, 1980 (aged 64) United States
- Area: Cartoonist
- Notable works: Editorial cartoons
- Awards: Pulitzer Prize for Editorial Cartooning, 1969; National Cartoonists Society Editorial Cartoon Award, 1962–1965

John R. Fischetti (September 27, 1916 – November 18, 1980) was an editorial cartoonist for the New York Herald Tribune and the Chicago Daily News. He received a Pulitzer Prize for Editorial Cartooning in 1969 and numerous awards from the National Cartoonists Society.

The Fischetti Editorial Cartoon Competition Award, also known as the John Fischetti Award, is named after him.

== Biography ==
Fischetti was born in Brooklyn, New York, where his Italian father was a barber. As a teenager during the Great Depression, he worked various jobs, including one at a hotel where Rollin Kirby, one of his influences, lived. At 19, Fischetti began studying commercial art at the Pratt Institute in Brooklyn, where he continued his education for three years (1937–1940).

Then he moved to California, where he worked for the Walt Disney Studio in Burbank. Fischetti's job with Disney lasted only nine months, due to the work's strain on his eyes.

While pursuing freelance work, Fischetti began his career as an editorial cartoonist at the Chicago Sun in 1941. Some of his freelance work appeared in such publications as Esquire, The Saturday Evening Post and Collier's.

Fischetti served 1942–1945 as a radio operator and army sergeant during World War II. In 1945 he joined the staff of Stars & Stripes as a war-time artist with Dick Wingert and other war-time cartoonists.

From 1951 to 1962 Fischetti was a syndicated cartoonist for the Newspaper Enterprise Association. He then joined the New York Herald Tribune, departing in 1967 when that paper folded. In 1967 he moved back to Chicago and joined the Chicago Daily News, which ceased publication in 1978. He joined Bill Mauldin at the Chicago Sun-Times two years before he died of a heart attack in 1980.

He published a compilation of his cartoons Zinga Zinga Za in 1973.

== Style ==
Fischetti, like many of his colleagues, favored heavy use of crayon, pencil or ink brush in a vertical format at the beginning of his post-war career. By the 1960s, as his style matured, he began using a horizontal pen-and-ink style that betrayed his roots in animation, Fischetti satirized politics, fads and social issues.

== Awards ==
In 1969, he won the Pulitzer Prize for Editorial Cartooning in honor of the body of his work. He also received the National Cartoonists Society's Editorial Cartoon Award in 1962, 1963, 1964, and 1965.

== John Fischetti Award ==
The Fischetti Editorial Cartoon Competition Award, usually referred to as the John Fischetti Award, is given annually to a staff, syndicated or regularly published professional cartoonist for cartoons on current social and political subjects (including sports and entertainment) published in a daily or weekly newspaper or regularly published periodical (including Internet publications) in the United States. They are administered by the Journalism Department of Columbia College Chicago.
