= Kevin Kallaugher =

American cartoonist

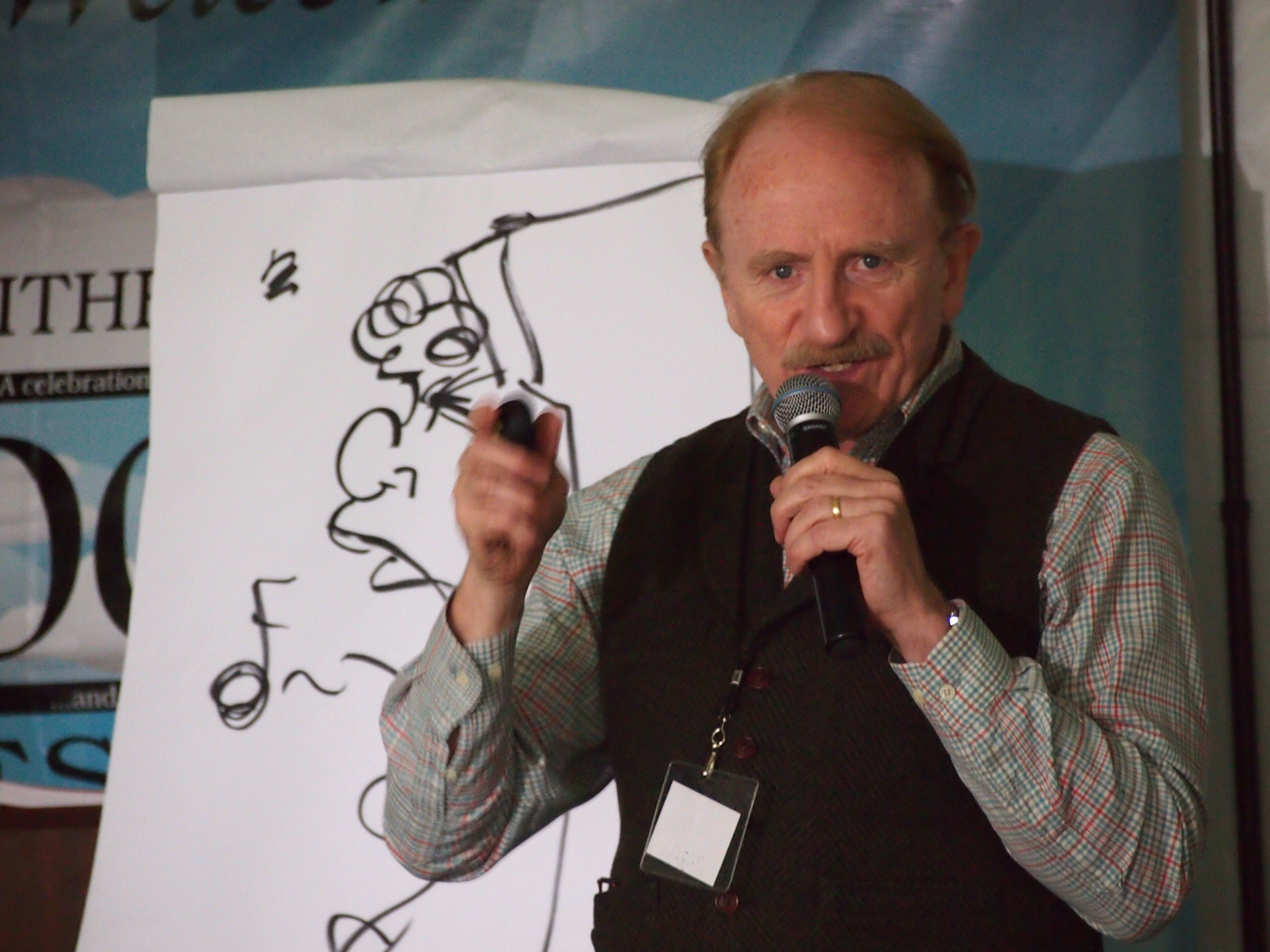
- Kallaugher in 2016
- Born: March 23, 1955 (age 71) Norwalk, Connecticut
- Area: Political cartoonist
- Pseudonym: KAL

Kevin Kallaugher (born March 23, 1955, in Norwalk, Connecticut) is a political cartoonist for The Economist. He formerly drew editorial cartoons for The Baltimore Sun. He cartoons using the pen name KAL.

== Editorial cartoon career ==
Kallaugher graduated from Harvard College with honors in visual and environmental studies in 1977. After that, he undertook a cycling tour of the British Isles, joining the Brighton Bears Basketball Club as a player and coach. When the club ran into financial trouble, Kallaugher began drawing caricatures of tourists on Brighton Pier and in Trafalgar Square.

In 1978 Kallaugher applied for a job working at The Economist, regarding it as his final opportunity to land a cartooning job in the United Kingdom. He initially was offered the opportunity to work a one-day cartooning "trial". Coincidentally, his first assignment was to draw a caricature of Denis Healey, of whom Kallaugher had already drawn a caricature while watching a televised interview with Healey the previous evening. Kallaugher was subsequently hired as the first resident cartoonist in the then 135-year history of The Economist. He spent the following 10 years in London working for such publications as The Observer, The Sunday Telegraph, Today and The Mail on Sunday.

Kallaugher returned to the United States in 1988, becoming the editorial cartoonist for The Baltimore Sun. Over the course of his 17 years at the newspaper up to 2006, he drew more than 4,000 cartoons for The Sun while also drawing two cartoons per week for The Economist. He left The Sun in 2006, but returned in 2012.

In June 2025, Kallagher said he had been dismissed from The Baltimore Sun. He said it was because the politics of his work did not match those of the paper's new majority owner, Sinclair Broadcast Group chairman David D. Smith. He said he was asked to attend a meeting the previous December at Sinclair headquarters where Smith said he planned to hire a local-topics cartoonist and derided Kallaugher's work as "ultra-liberal." Kallaugher declined to restrict his work to local issues.
