= Cagle Cartoons =

Editorial syndication service

- Type: Print and digital syndicate
- Industry: Political cartoons, Opinion columns
- Founded: 2000
- Founder: Daryl Cagle
- Headquarters: Santa Barbara, California, USA
- Website: www.caglecartoons.com

Cagle Cartoons, Inc. is a syndication service for political cartoons and opinion columnists. Started by editorial cartoonist Daryl Cagle in 2001, Cagle Cartoons distributes the cartoons of sixty cartoonists and fourteen columnists to more than 850 subscribing newspapers in the United States and around the world, including over half of America's daily, paid-circulation newspapers.

Cagle Cartoons syndicates the political cartoons of four Pulitzer Prize winners: Adam Zyglis, Mike Keefe, Kevin Siers, and Steve Sack. Cagle Cartoons also syndicates the political cartoons of four winners of the “Cow” or the “Grand Prix de l'Humour Vache” from the Salon International de la Caricature, du Dessin de Presse et d’humour” in Saint-Just-le-Martel, France: Patrick Chappatte (2021), Rayma Suprani (2014), Angel Boligan (2017) and Daryl Cagle (2013).

== Structure ==
Cagle Cartoons is a "package service" where subscribing publications receive all of the content and can reprint whatever they choose for one fee. Cagle does not charge delivery fees for his service, noting digital delivery replaced the cost of mailing features years ago.

== Controversy ==
In August 2020, a cartoon spotlighting racial injustice, drawn by David Fitzsimmons of the Arizona Daily Star, whose work is syndicated by Cagle Cartoons, drew controversy after it was shared to eighth-grade students by a teacher as part of an assignment to interpret the cartoon. Texas Governor Greg Abbott called for the teacher to be fired.

== Notable cartoonists and columnists syndicated by Cagle Cartoons ==
- Pat Bagley
- Pat Byrnes
- Patrick Chappatte
- Jaume Capdevila
- Daryl Cagle
- Bill Day
- Will Durst
- Bob Englehart
- Randall Enos
- Christine Flowers
- Peter Funt
- Emad Hajjaj
- Osama Hajjaj
- Mike Keefe
- Phil Kerpen
- Yaakov Kirschen
- Jeff Koterba
- Peter Kuper
- Dick Polman
- Michael Reagan
- Steve Sack
- Kevin Siers
- Rayma Suprani
- Elwood Watson
- Dave Whamond
- Monte Wolverton
- Adam Zyglis
