= Kevin Siers =

American editorial cartoonist

- Born: 1954 (age 71–72); Minnesota
- Education: University of Minnesota
- Known for: Editorial cartoonist
- Awards: 2014 Pulitzer Prize for Editorial Cartooning

Kevin Siers (pronounced Sires) is an American editorial cartoonist formerly working for The Charlotte Observer and is syndicated by Cagle Cartoons. He was awarded the 2014 Pulitzer Prize for Editorial Cartooning.

== Biography ==
Siers was born in Minnesota around 1954. His father was a mechanic who worked in ore mines. Before he could spell, Siers would draw cartoons, then add speech balloons to the drawings in which he would scribble gibberish. In elementary school, a fifth-grade teacher recognized his talent for drawing and encouraged him to create a comic book. Teachers at his high school continued to encourage his development. Initially, his drawings were copied from the style of popular comic strips, including most importantly the daily strips Dick Tracy, Lil' Abner and Pogo, and then later from the style of Marvel Comics. He was working as an iron ore miner in Minnesota when he began to draw editorial cartoons during a layoff.

Using money from his mining job, he attended the University of Minnesota as a biology major on a part-time basis, and joined the staff of campus newspaper Minnesota Daily as editorial cartoonist. While there, he became acquainted with Steve Sack (who won a Pulitzer for Editorial Cartooning the year before Siers), who became Siers' mentor. In 1987 he began drawing for The Charlotte Observer as an editorial cartoonist. He was further mentored there by Doug Marlette, the primary editorial cartoonist at the Observer at the time.

He was awarded the 2014 Pulitzer Prize for Editorial Cartooning for "his thought-provoking cartoons drawn with a sharp wit and bold artistic style." Siers was the third cartoonist from The Observer to win the Pulitzer, for "thought-provoking cartoons drawn with a sharp wit and bold artistic style."

== Work ==
Siers is known for making fun of politics without regard to affiliation. He divides his workday into three parts; the first part of his day is spent researching and assembling ideas, in the second phase he doodles the ideas and determines which combinations have the most potential, and he finalizes his daily cartoon by mid-day. He does not use a computer to create his cartoons, but instead draws in the traditional manner using fine-point pens and a watercolor brush. He does use Photoshop to add color after he has scanned his cartoon to digital format.

Though Siers describes himself as "very liberal", The Washington Post said in 2014 about half his cartoons attacked Barack Obama and half lampooned conservatives. He is the only local cartoonist in the Carolinas producing daily cartoons. His work is syndicated by Cagle Cartoons.

On July 11, 2023, he was let go by the owner of the Charlotte Observer, McClatchy Newspapers. The editorial cartoonists of two other newspapers owned by McClatchy, Jack Ohman at the Sacramento Bee and Joel Pett at the Lexington Herald-Leader, also received notice on that day.
