= Clifford K. Berryman =

American cartoonist (1869–1949)

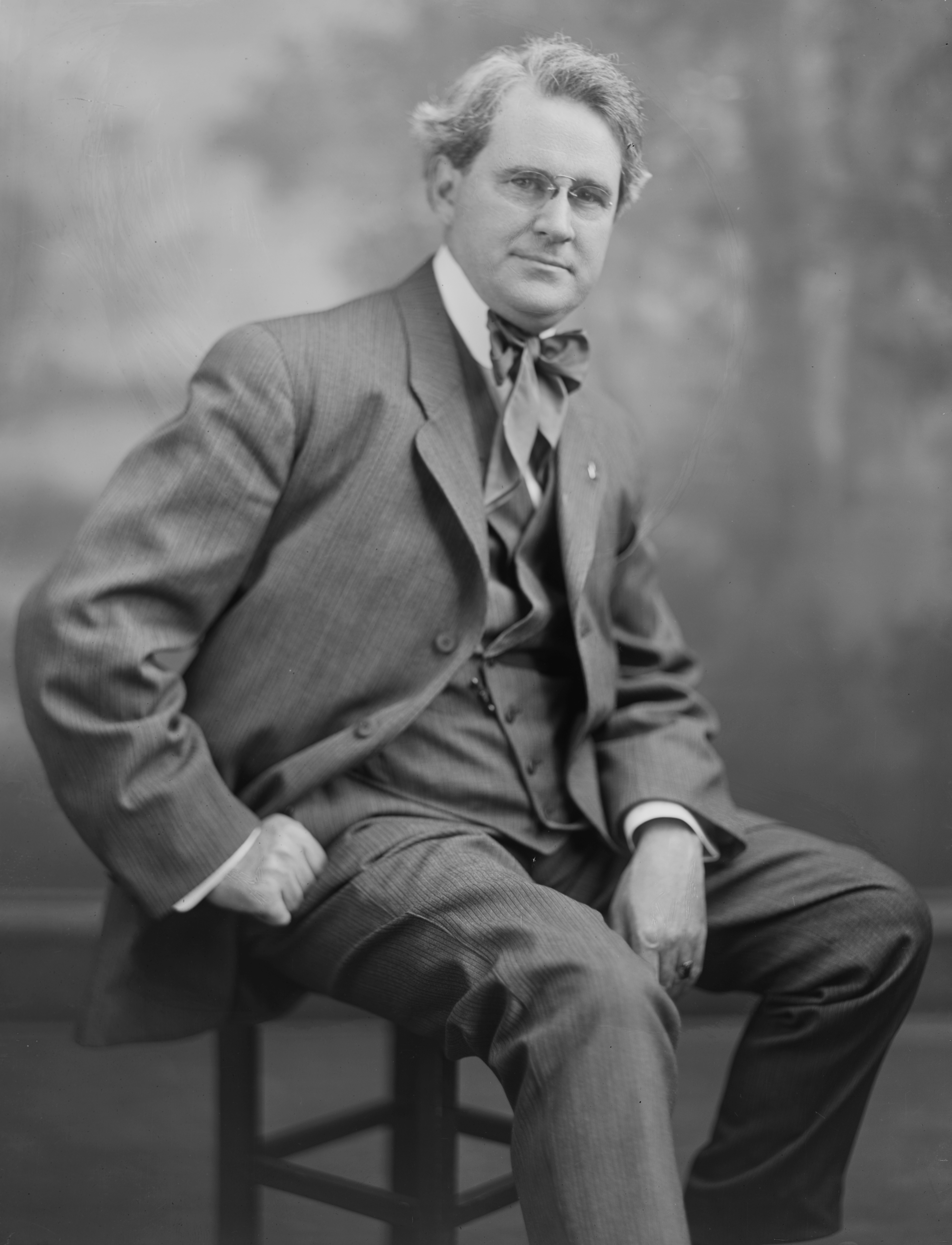
- Berryman in an early 20th century Harris & Ewing photo
- Born: April 2, 1869 Clifton, Kentucky, US
- Died: December 11, 1949 (aged 80) Washington, D.C., US
- Area: Editorial cartoonist
- Notable works: "Remember the Maine" "Drawing the Line in Mississippi"
- Awards: Pulitzer Prize for Editorial Cartooning, 1944
- Spouse: Kate Geddes Durfee (m. 1893)
- Children: James T. Berryman

Clifford Kennedy Berryman (April 2, 1869 – December 11, 1949) was a Pulitzer Prize–winning cartoonist with The Washington Star newspaper from 1907 to 1949. He was previously a cartoonist for The Washington Post from 1891 to 1907.

During his career, Berryman drew thousands of cartoons commenting on American presidents and politics. Political figures he lampooned included former Presidents Theodore Roosevelt, Franklin D. Roosevelt, and Harry S. Truman. He is particularly known for his cartoons "Remember the Maine" and "Drawing the Line in Mississippi."

Berryman was a prominent figure in Washington, D.C. President Harry S. Truman once told him, "You are ageless and timeless. Presidents, senators and even Supreme Court justices come and go, but the Monument and Berryman stand." Berryman's cartoons can be found at the Library of Congress, the National Archives, and George Washington University, as well as archives that house presidential collections.

== Biography ==
=== Early life ===
Berryman was born on April 2, 1869, in Clifton, Kentucky, to James Thomas Berryman and Sallie Church Berryman. Berryman's father often entertained friends and neighbors with drawings of "hillbillies" from their hometown; Clifford inherited his father's knack for drawing.

=== Editorial cartoons ===
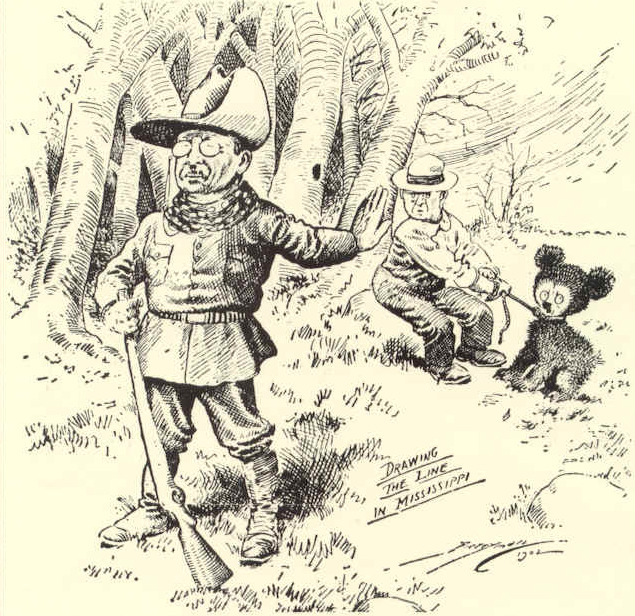
Berryman's 1902 political cartoon in The Washington Post spawned the teddy bear.

Berryman was appointed draftsman to the United States Patent Office in Washington, D.C., serving there from 1886 to 1891. During his tenure, Berryman submitted sketches to The Washington Post. In 1891, he became an understudy of political cartoonist George Y. Coffin at The Washington Post. After Coffin died in 1896, Berryman took over the position as cartoonist for the newspaper.

As a political cartoonist, Berryman satirized both Democrats and Republicans, and covered topics such as drought, farm relief, food prices, representation of Washington, D.C., in Congress, labor strikes and legislation, campaigning and elections, political patronage, European coronations, the America's Cup, and the atomic bomb.

In 1898, during the Spanish–American War, The Post printed Berryman's classic illustration "Remember the Maine," which became the battle-cry for American sailors during the War. His November 16, 1902, cartoon, "Drawing the Line in Mississippi," depicted President Theodore Roosevelt showing compassion for a small bear cub. The cartoon inspired New York store owner Morris Michtom to create a new toy and call it the teddy bear.

Berryman worked at The Washington Post until 1907, when he was hired by The Washington Star. Berryman was the first cartoonist member of the Gridiron Club and served as the organization's president in 1926.

He drew political cartoons for The Washington Star until his death in 1949. As a Washingtonian, he was an advocate for DC voting rights.

=== Personal life ===
Berryman married Kate Geddes Durfee on July 5, 1893, and they had three children: Mary Belle, who died as an infant, Florence Seville, who later became an art critic, and James Thomas, who became a Pulitzer Prize–winning cartoonist.

Berryman was a Presbyterian and an active member of the Washington Heights Presbyterian Church.

== Awards ==
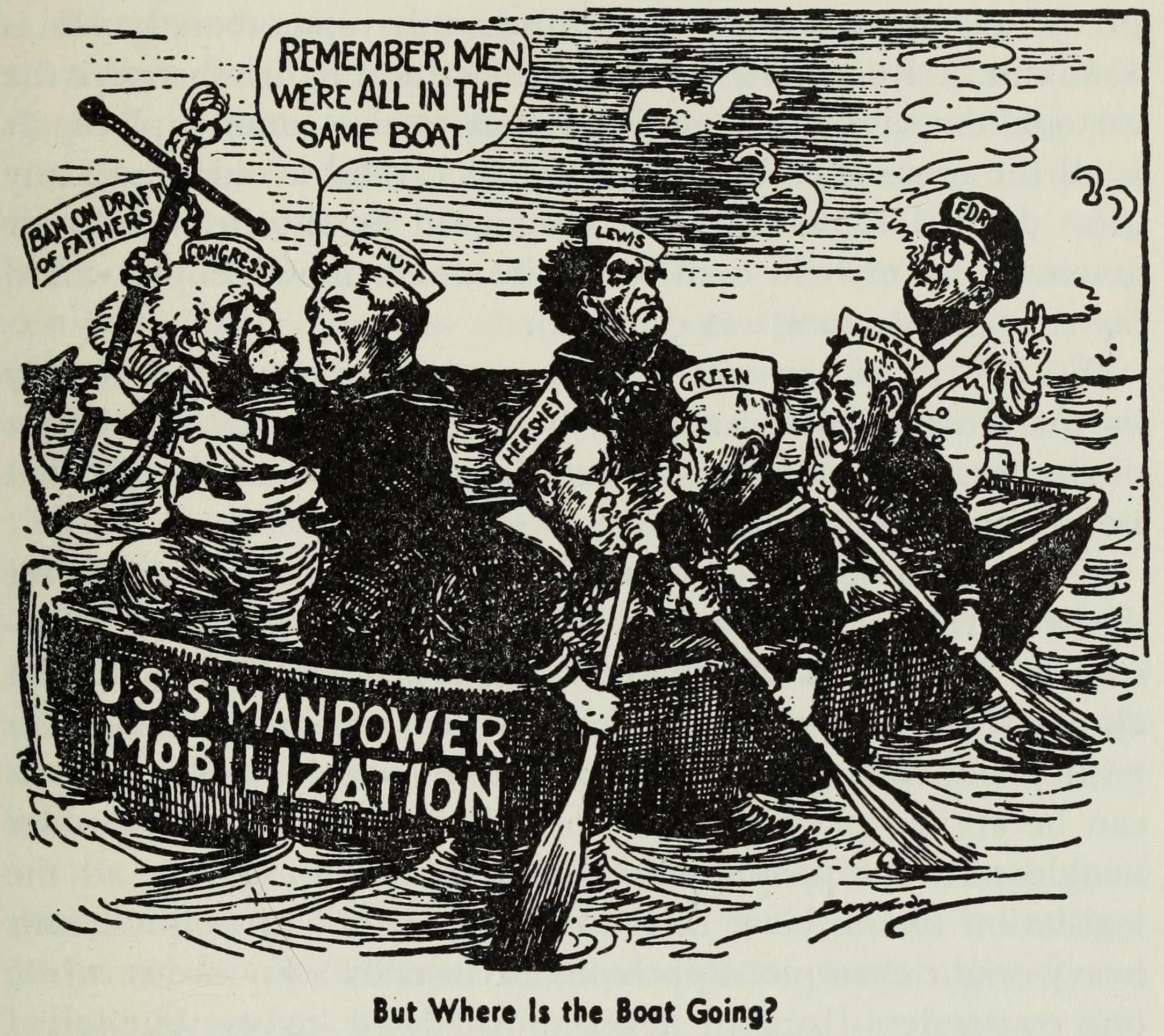
"But Where Is the Boat Going?", a political cartoon that earned Berryman the 1944 Pulitzer Prize for Editorial Cartooning

In 1944, Berryman was awarded the Pulitzer Prize for Editorial Cartooning for his drawing "But Where is the Boat Going." The cartoon depicted President Franklin D. Roosevelt and other government officials trying to steer the USS Mississippi in several different directions.

=== Clifford K. and James T. Berryman Award for Editorial Cartooning ===
Since 1989, the National Press Foundation has presented the Clifford K. and James T. Berryman Award annually for editorial cartooning. Winners have included Chip Bok (1993), Jim Morin (1996), Kevin Kallaugher (2002), Rex Babin (2003), Steve Sack (2006), Matt Wuerker (2010), Nick Anderson (2011), Adam Zyglis (2013), and Clay Bennett (2014).

== Death ==
Berryman died on December 11, 1949, from a heart ailment, age 80, and is interred in Glenwood Cemetery in Washington, D.C.

== Gallery ==
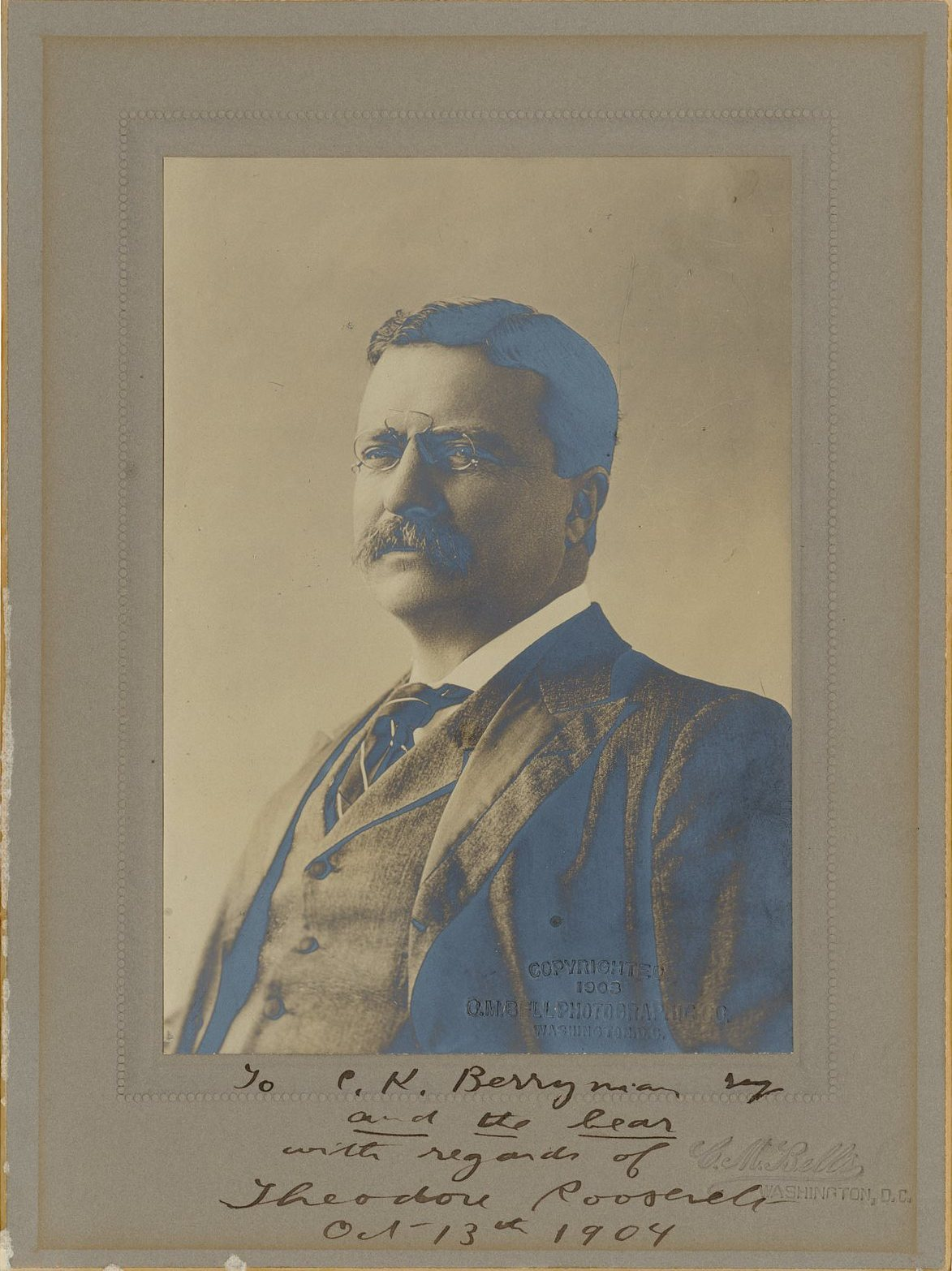
A signed 1904 photo President Theodore Roosevelt sent to Berryman

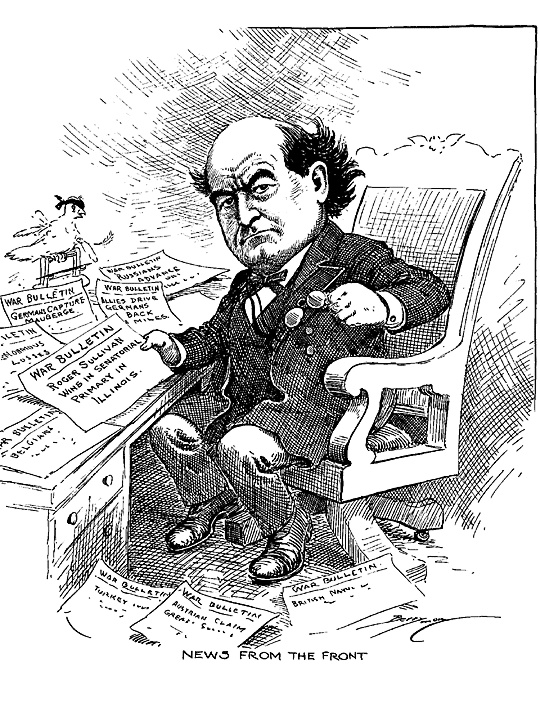
William Jennings Bryan reading news from fronts during World War I in 1914

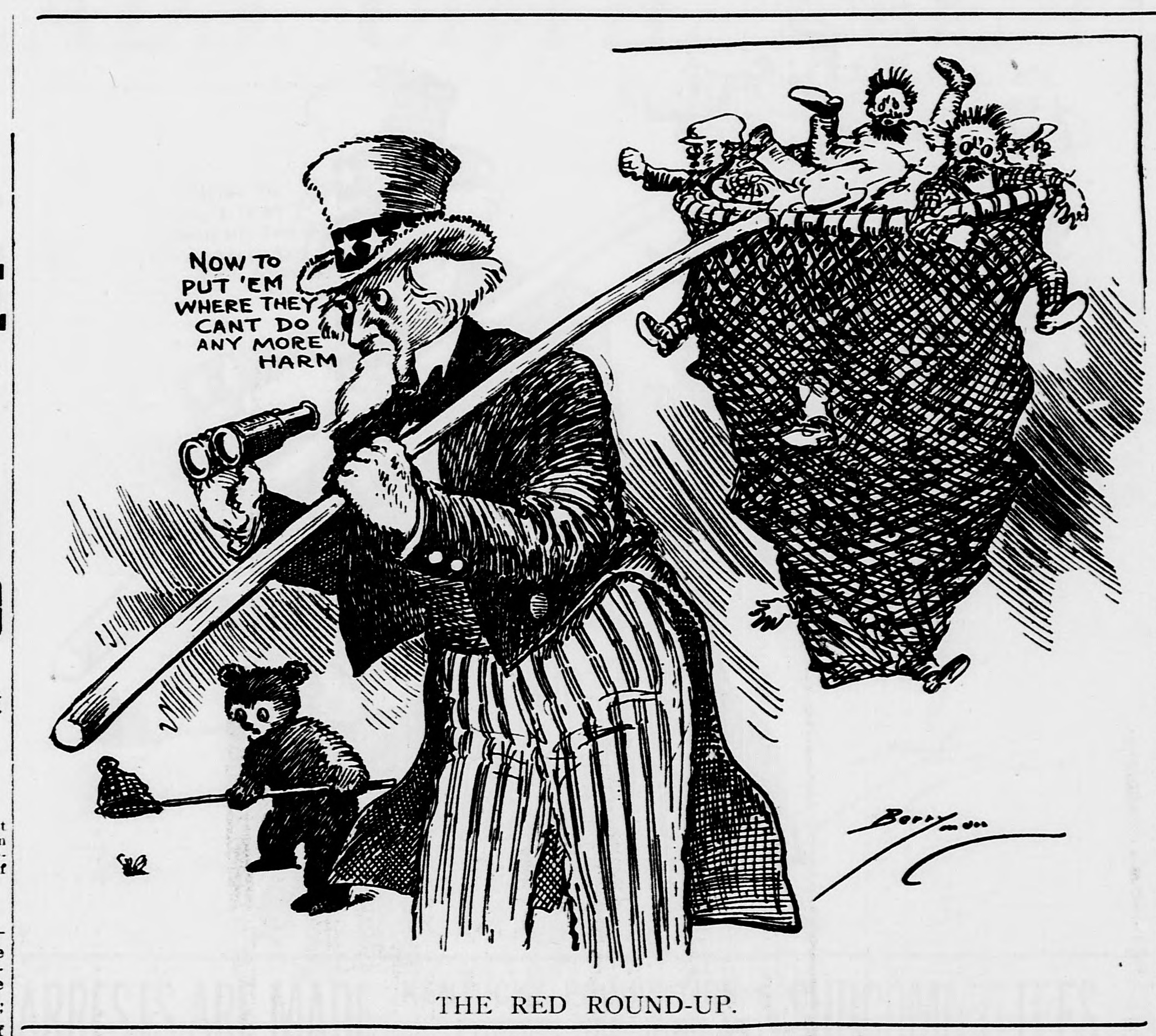
"The Red Round-Up" about the 1919 Palmer Raids efforts to deport radicals

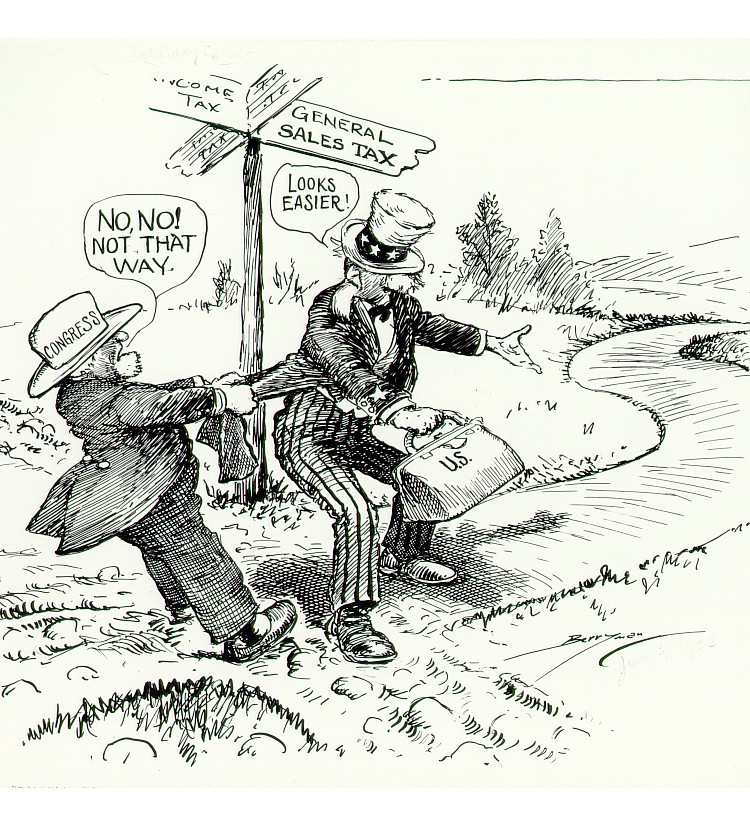
A comedic representation of the debate about the income tax in the United States

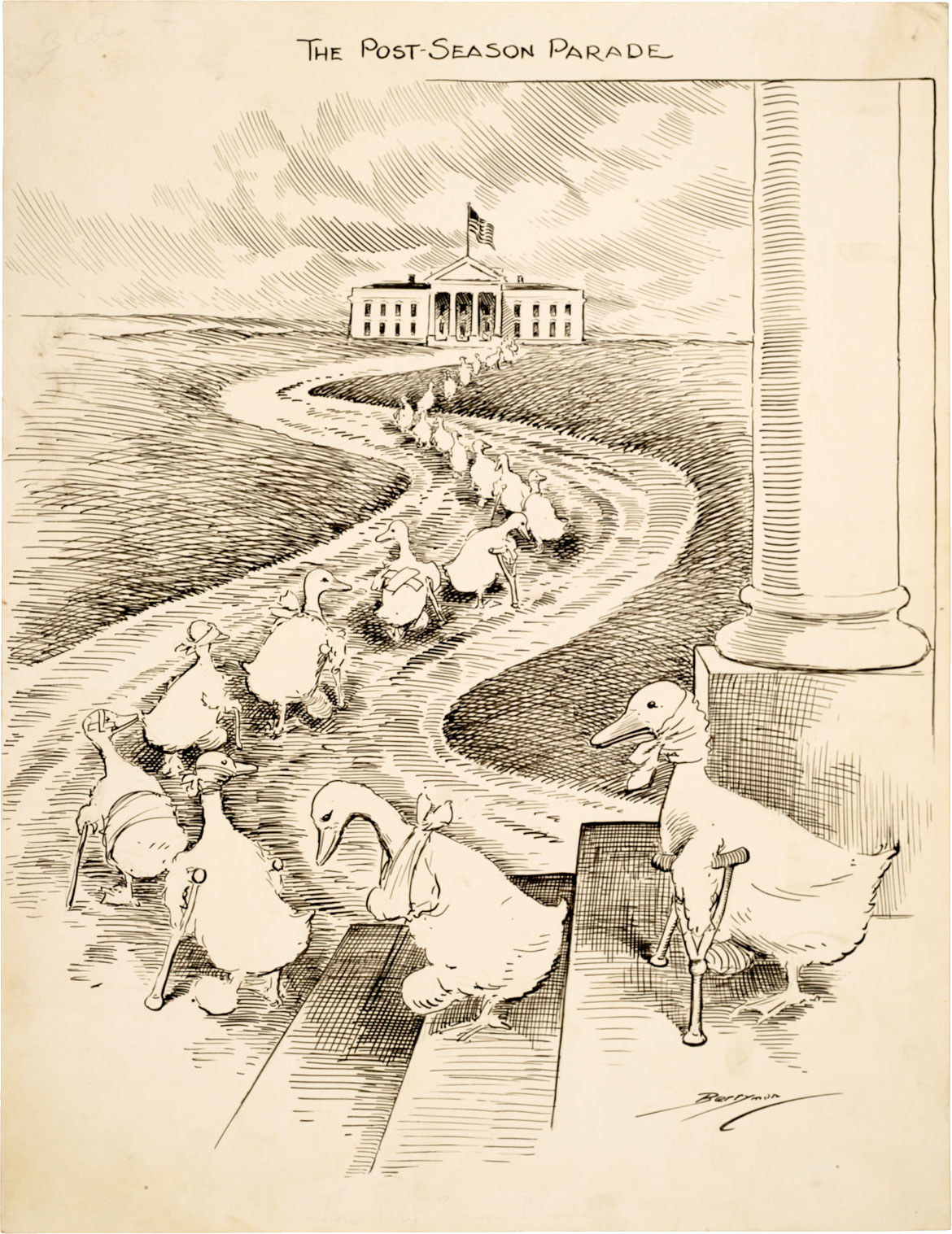
After being defeated, "lame duck" Democrats head to the White House in hopes of securing political appointments from President Woodrow Wilson

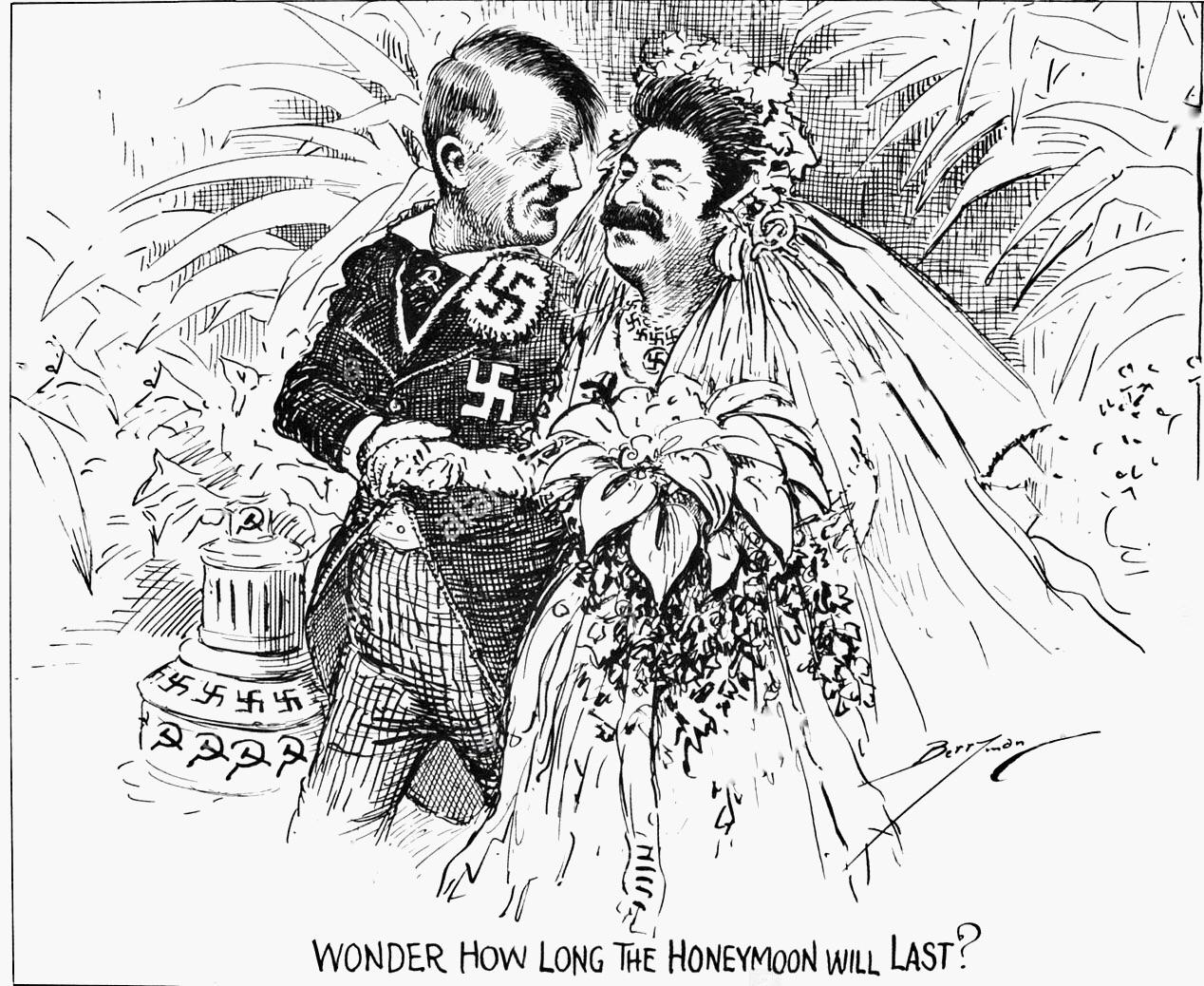
"Wonder how long the honeymoon will last?" from The Washington Star in 1939

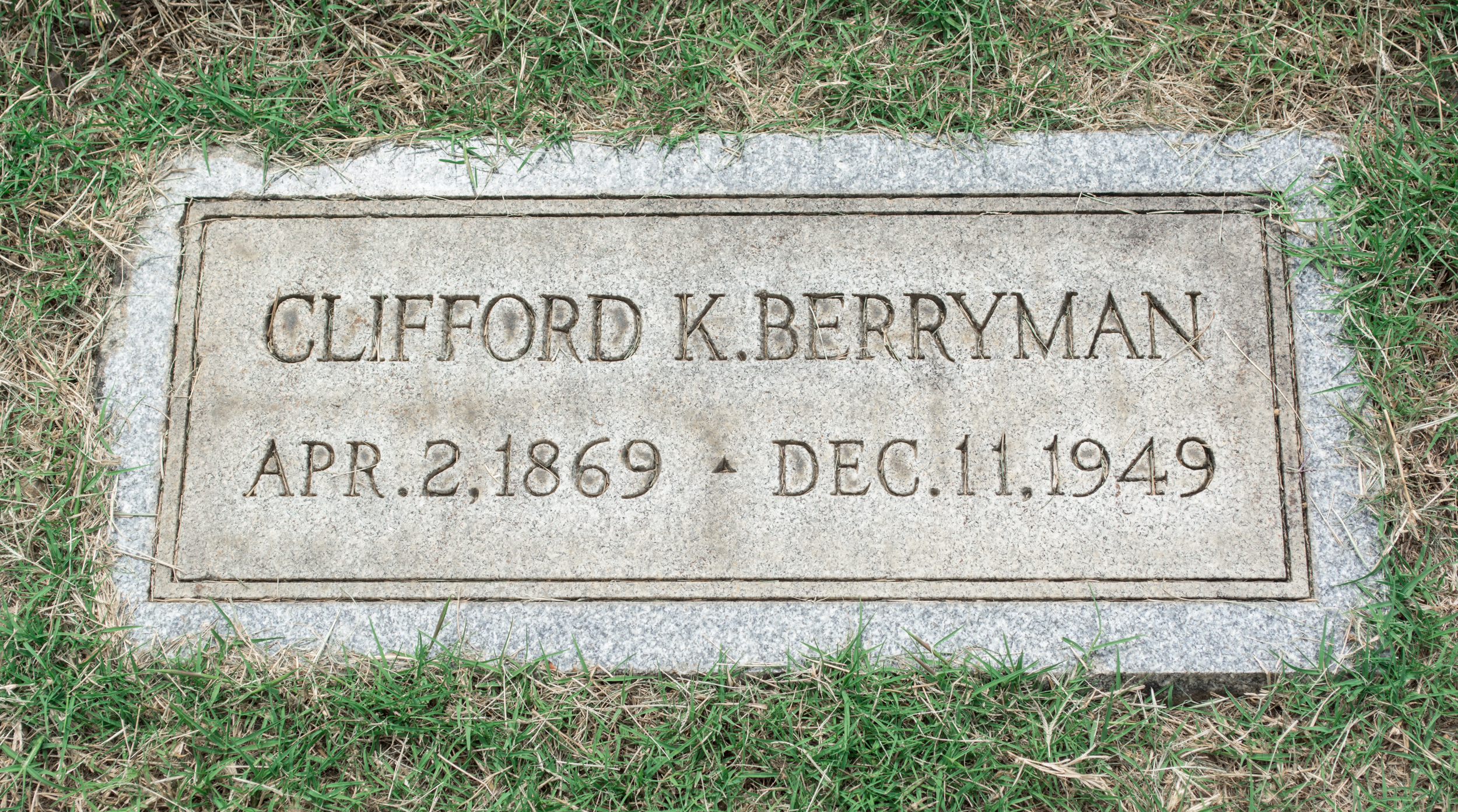
Berryman's gravesite at Glenwood Cemetery in Washington, D.C.
