= Robert Waldo Brunelle Jr. =

American painter

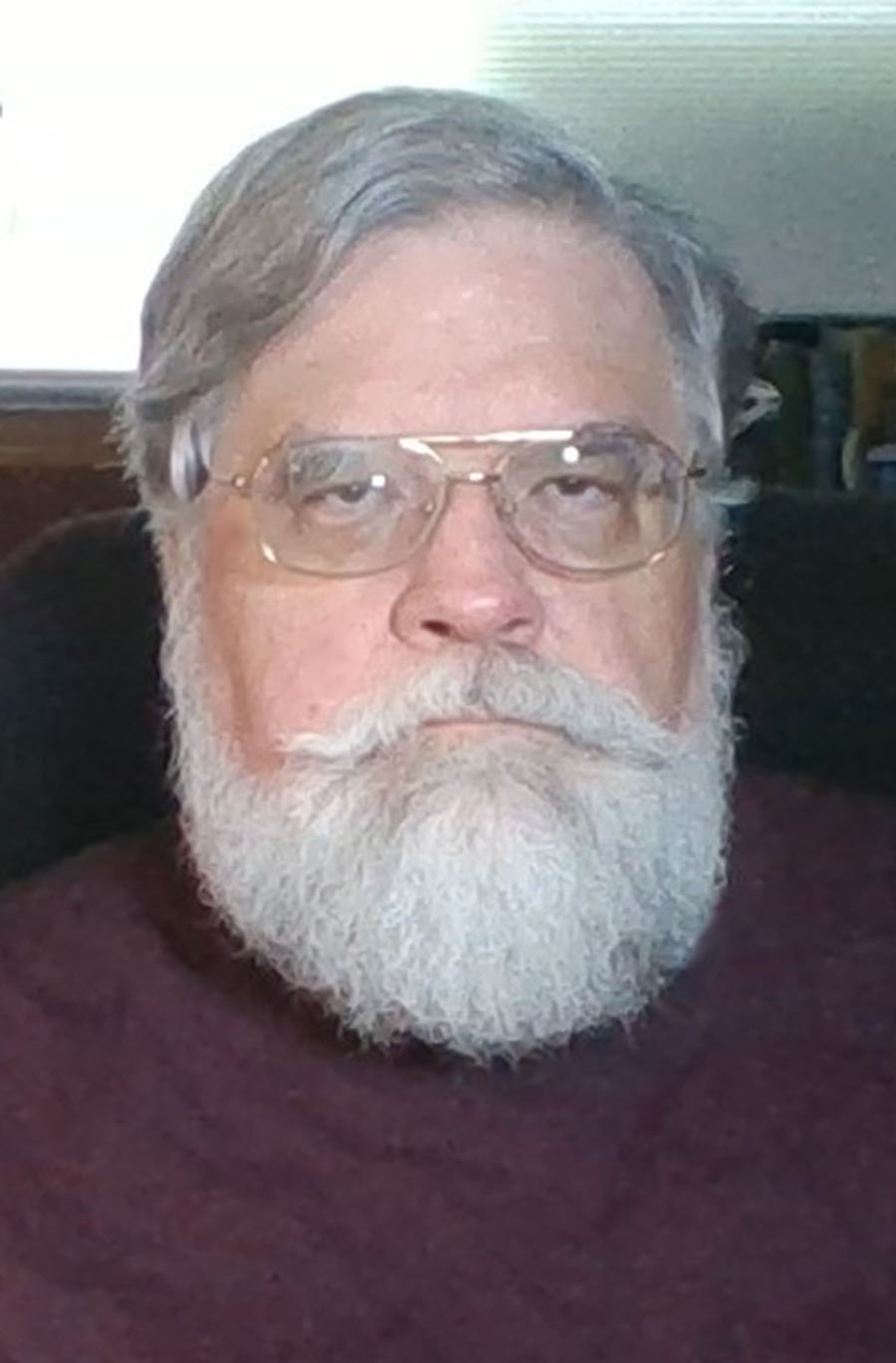
- Brunelle in 2021
- Education: Saint Michael's College; Castleton State College
- Occupations: Painter, author, historian, cartoonist

Robert Waldo Brunelle Jr. is an American painter, author, historian, and cartoonist. His comic strip Mr. Brunelle Explains it All features his takes on politics, current events, and social trends.

== Early life ==
The Vermont Art Guide said, "He counts among his artistic ancestors a great-grandfather, great-grandmother and great-great grandfather, all of whom were painters."

Robert Brunelle attended Mount Saint Joseph Academy in Rutland, receiving his diploma in 1976. He graduated in 1980 from St. Michael's College in Colchester, Vermont with dual bachelor's degrees in history and fine arts. His Masters in Art Education degree was conferred on him by Castleton State College, now Castleton University in Castleton, Vermont, in 1985. Beginning in 1981, he taught art at Browns River Middle School in Jericho, Vermont.

== Visual art ==
Brunelle has been producing oil and acrylic paintings, shown in regional galleries, since 1975. His early influences included Charles Dana Gibson and Al Capp. Much of his work focuses on local, everyday scenes of buildings, automobiles, and persons interacting with them. Rod Underhill's portrait of 'The Yankee Painter' notes, "Echoes of history are usually present in his work." Brunelle served as president of the Northern Vermont Artist Association from 1995 to 2011, and now is its vice president.

The Vermont newspaper The Brattleboro Reformer reviewed his visual art saying it depicts "images of lonely and alienated individuals, which diverge from Hopper (Edward Hopper) in their quirky sense of humor and saturated color".

== Published works ==
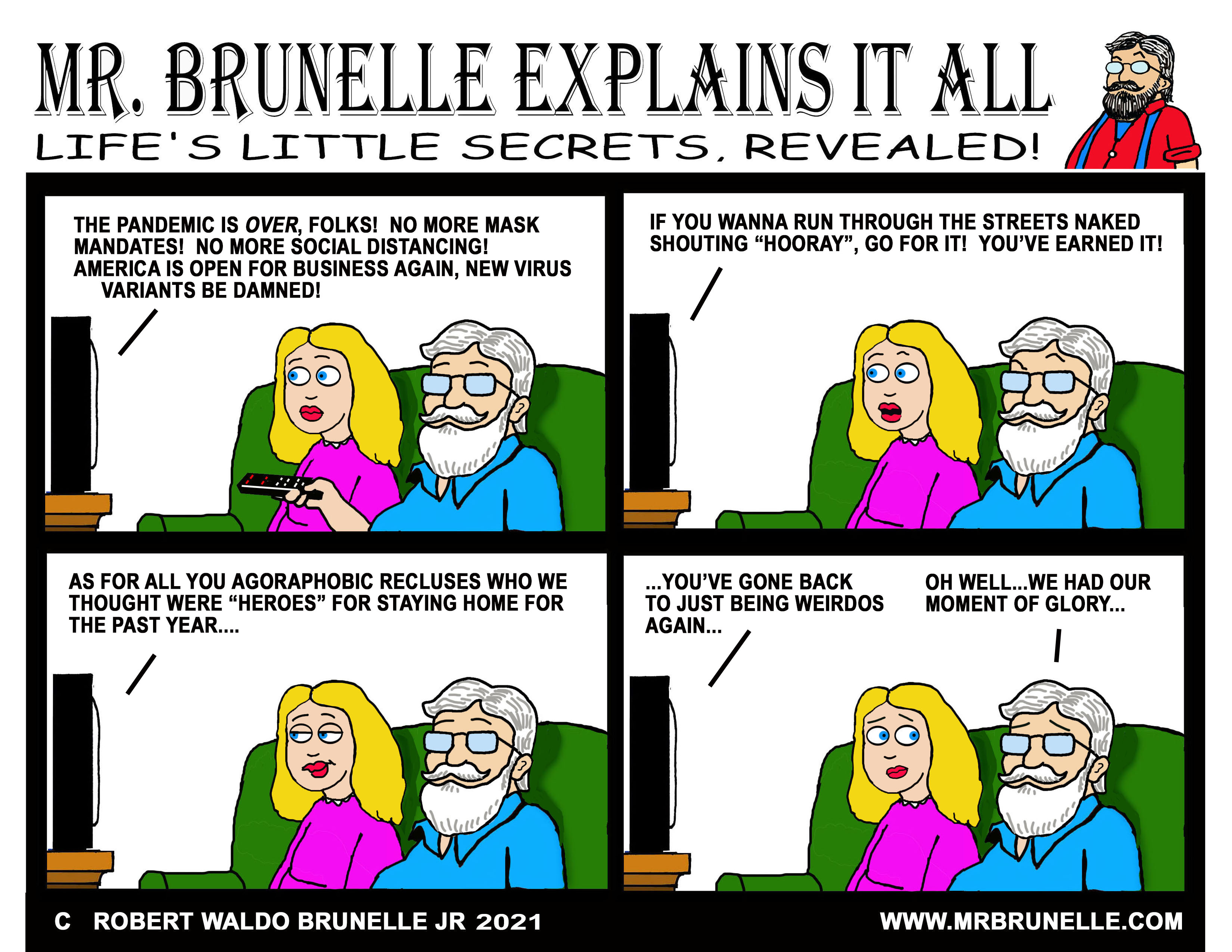
"Weirdos Again" from the comic strip Mr. Brunelle Explains it All by Robert Waldo Brunelle Jr., September 2009

His comic strip, Mr. Brunelle Explains It All, appeared monthly in the humor magazine The Funny Times, and weekly on their website Humor Times until 2020. He continues to host the strip on his social media sites. It ran in the Vermont Times newsweekly and in the Seven Days newsweekly from 2016 to 2020. The Seven Days newspaper said that Brunelle's cartoon work "reveals a dry wit and a penchant for skewering political follies, not to mention the general silliness and self-absorption of humans."

Brunelle has illustrated books for authors including:

- Jack and the Bean Soup by Mark Pendergrast, Nature's Face Publications
- Silly Sadie by Mark Pendergrast, Nature's Face Publications.
- Vermont Ghost Guide: A Second Conjuring by Joseph A. Citro, Eerie Lights Publishing
- Vermont Ghost Experience by Joseph A. Citro, Eerie Lights Publishing

Brunelle has authored:

- Mr. Brunelle Explains It All, 1997 to present
- Satire Has Become Impossible, 2011
- Grampy! on Alfred Charles Key Sr. 2017
- History of the Northern Vermont Artist Association, Kasini House Books. 2009
- The Lesser Known Haunted Houses, 2014
- What I Have Painted So Far
- Know Your Nut Jobs! A Handy Field Guide, 2021
