= Dry Bones =

Dry Bones may refer to:

- The Vision of the Valley of Dry Bones, in the Book of Ezekiel
- "Dem Bones", a traditional song based on Ezekiel 37:14
- "Dry Bones" (folk song)
- Dry Bones (comic strip), a political cartoon formerly published in The Jerusalem Post
- "Dry Bones", a short story by William Sanders
- Dry Bones, the band that later changed their name to Everdown and signed to Solid State Records
- Dry Bones, a recurring enemy character from the Super Mario series
