= Humor Times =

- "World's Funniest News Source!"
- Type: Monthly Magazine
- Publisher: James Israel
- Editor: James Israel
- Founded: April 1991
- Political alignment: Political satire magazine and website
- Headquarters: Sacramento, California, United States
- Website: humortimes.com

Humor Times is an American monthly magazine that "reviews the news" using political satire.

== History ==
The publication was founded in Sacramento, California by publisher/editor James Israel, with the premiere issue appearing in April, 1991, originally titled the Comic Press News. It features various editorial cartoons, columns by political comedians, a fake news section ala The Onion, and more.

The Humor Times began as the Comic Press News in April 1991, changing its name with its 16th anniversary issue in April 2007. The name-change was noted in Sacramento's Sacramento News & Review.

The publication was distributed free in the Sacramento area for the first 16 years, 9 months, being supported by advertising. The last free issue was the December 2007 edition. It is now available in stores and by subscription, in print or digital formats.

The Humor Times has celebrated its anniversaries locally in Sacramento with events through the years, such as a show by The Capitol Steps traveling troupe in April 2013.

== Description ==
The Humor Times is printed on newsprint, with color on most of the pages; it is also available in digital form, which is all color.

The publication features editorial cartoons that comment on current events in the United States and throughout the world. Some of the editorial cartoonists include: Pat Bagley, Mike Baldwin, John Darkow, Mike Keefe, R. J. Matson, Mike Lane, Jeff Parker, Rob Rogers, Steve Sack, Harley Schwadron, Adam Zyglis, Michael Egan and many more. These cartoons are grouped by subject, with short quips above each cartoon, stringing them together in a storyline that adds even more humor to the subject. The sections are titled separately — for example, a page on climate change might be titled Wake-up Call.

The paper also features political strip cartoons by various artists. These include:

- Ruben Bolling's Tom the Dancing Bug
- Jim Siergey's Cultural Jet Lag
- Michael Egans Editorial and Political cartoons and more.

Other, non-political cartoons are also featured, such as

- Dan Piraro's Bizarro
- Mike Baldwin's Cornered.

More features of the paper include:

- Will Durst's comical political observations, Strange But True, a compendium of weird news stories
- Jim Hightower's The Hightower Lowdown.

A satirical news section is titled "Faux News", and features articles that mimic real news stories, but are full of satirical twists. Most are original to the Humor Times, from a stable of authors.
