= Bill Day (cartoonist) =

American cartoonist

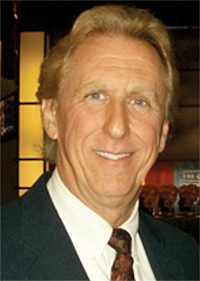
- Editorial cartoonist Bill Day
- Areas: Cartoonist, satirist

Bill Day is an American cartoonist best known for his syndicated editorial cartoons. Day has won numerous industry awards and also has drawn criticism over his reuse of his own previously drawn material as well as over his opposition to the National Rifle Association of America and his advocacy of gun control.

== Career ==
Day attended the University of Florida, where he studied political science. It was at this time that he first began drawing political cartoons.

Day has won the Robert F. Kennedy Journalism Award twice (in 1985 and in 2010), the National Cartoonists Society award for best editorial cartoon in 1996, and several other industry awards.

Day's cartoons are syndicated nationally and internationally by Daryl Cagle's company Cagle Cartoons.

=== Audience rallied on his behalf ===
After being laid-off by the Commercial Appeal in Memphis, Day struggled with odd jobs and nearly lost his home. Cagle Cartoons launched an Indiegogo campaign in 2012 to help Day and supporters contributed $42,264 in support of the cartoonist.

=== Gun control cartoon tweeted ===
A recurring subject in Day's cartoons is gun control in America. He has drawn many cartoons advocating the need for more gun control and criticizing the National Rifle Association of America (NRA).

On September 18, 2013, in reference to the Washington Navy Yard shooting, Rep. Steve Cohen (D-Tenn.) tweeted one of Day's anti-NRA cartoons that featured a gun with the words "NRA" along with the U.S. Capital and Washington Monument attached to it. The cartoon and Cohen's tweets drew an angry response from the political right, including Fox News host Bill O'Reilly, who called Cohen's tweets "despicable" and said Cohen was trying to "exploit the mass murder for political reasons".

"Bill Day is one of the great cartoonists, and is one of my friends and constituents. He's been doing a series on gun violence and how it's affected America," Cohen said on MSNBC. "I wanted to get Bill Day's cartoon out there in the marketplace of ideas, and I think there definitely is a connection between the NRA and the continuing gun culture that we have."

=== Responses to two 2013 criticisms ===
Day has been criticized for his tendency to reuse his own previously drawn comics with only slight alterations to make them topical, however, his fans consider the criticism a tempest in a teapot. Repetitive use of subject matter by artists is not uncommon and themes often may be seen developed during the careers of artists.

Day was accused of plagiarism in January 2013 when he used a computer-generated image of a gun taken from the website deviantArt in one of his draft comics without crediting or getting the permission of the original creator. Cagle said that Day had not been aware of the origin of the image and mistakenly believed it to be a photograph. Day noted that his cartoon featuring the image never had been published because he pulled the cartoon when the mistake he made was realized and he replaced it with another image. He also noted that the Poynter Institute, which investigates journalism ethics, dismissed the accusations against Day after looking into the incident. Cagle apologized to the original artist on Day's behalf.
