= Quisling =

Term for a traitor or collaborator

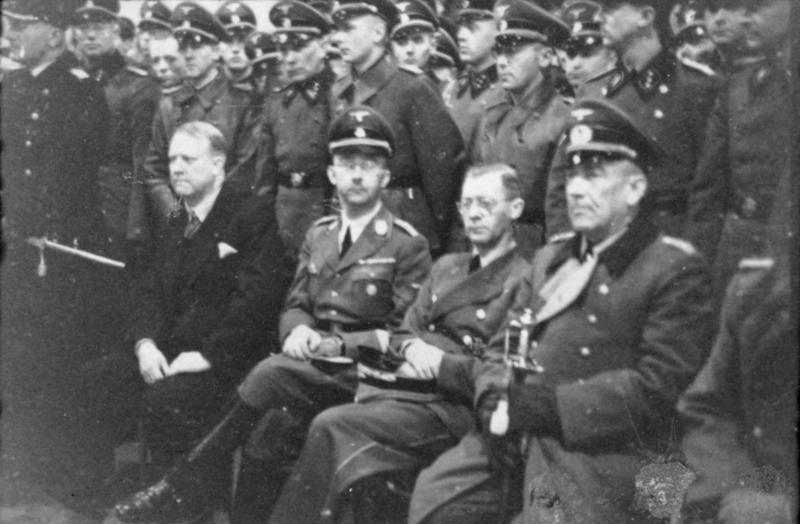
Left to right: Vidkun Quisling seated next to Heinrich Himmler, Josef Terboven and Nikolaus von Falkenhorst in front of officers of the Waffen-SS, German Army and Air Force in 1941

Quisling (/ˈkwɪzlɪŋ/, Norwegian: [ˈkvɪ̂slɪŋ]) is a term used in Scandinavian languages, English and southern Slavic languages to mean a citizen or politician of an occupied country who collaborates with an enemy occupying force; it may also be used more generally as a synonym for traitor or collaborator. The word originates from the surname of the Norwegian war-time leader Vidkun Quisling (1887–1945), who headed a domestic Nazi collaborationist regime during the Nazi occupation of Norway from 1940 to 1945, during the Second World War.

== Origin ==
Use of Vidkun Quisling's surname as a term predates World War II. The first recorded use of the term was by Norwegian Labour Party politician Oscar Torp in a 2 January 1933 newspaper interview, where he used it as a general term for Quisling's followers. Quisling was at this point in the process of establishing the Nasjonal Samling (National Unity) party, a fascist party modelled on the German Nazi Party. Further uses of the term were made by Aksel Sandemose, in a newspaper article in Dagbladet in 1934, and by the newspaper Vestfold Arbeiderblad, in 1936. The term with the opposite meaning, a Norwegian patriot, is jøssing.

== Popularization in World War II ==
The use of the name as a term for collaborators or traitors in general probably came about upon Quisling's unsuccessful 1940 coup d'état, when he attempted to seize power and make Norway cease resisting the invading Germans. The term was widely introduced to an English-speaking audience by the British newspaper The Times. It published an editorial on 19 April 1940 titled "Quislings Everywhere," in which it was asserted that "To writers, the word quisling is a gift from the gods. If they had been ordered to invent a new word for traitor... they could hardly have hit upon a more brilliant combination of letters. Aurally it contrives to suggest something at once slippery and tortuous." The Daily Mail picked up the term four days after The Times editorial was published. The War Illustrated discussed "potential quislings" among the Dutch during the German invasion of the Netherlands. Subsequently, the BBC brought the word into common use internationally.

Chips Channon described how during the Norway Debate of 7–8 May 1940, he and other Conservative MPs who supported Prime Minister of the United Kingdom Neville Chamberlain called those who voted against a motion of no confidence "quislings". Chamberlain's successor Winston Churchill used the term while addressing a conference of Allied delegates at St. James's Palace on 12 June 1941, when he said: "A vile race of quislings—to use a new word which will carry the scorn of mankind down the centuries—is hired to fawn upon the conqueror, to collaborate in his designs and to enforce his rule upon their fellow countrymen while groveling low themselves." He used the term again in an address to both houses of Congress in the United States of America on 26 December 1941. Commenting upon the effect of a number of Allied victories against Axis forces, and moreover the United States' decision to enter the war, Churchill opined: "Hope has returned to the hearts of scores of millions of men and women, and with that hope there burns the flame of anger against the brutal, corrupt invader. And still more fiercely burn the fires of hatred and contempt for the filthy quislings whom he has suborned." The term subsequently entered the language and became a target for political cartoonists.

In his work The Yugoslav peoples fight to live, Josip Broz Tito made several descriptions of his enemies as quislings, including General Milan Nedić ("the Serbian Quisling") and Dr. Ante Pavelić ("the criminal Croatian Quisling ... a creature of Mussolini and Hitler").

In the United States, it was used often. In the Warner Bros. cartoon Tom Turk and Daffy (1944), it was uttered by a Thanksgiving turkey whose presence is betrayed to Porky Pig by Daffy Duck. In the American film Edge of Darkness (1943), about the Resistance in Norway, the heroine's brother is described as a quisling.

=== Verb form ===
The back-formed verb, to quisle (/ˈkwɪzəl/) exists, and gave rise to a much less common version of the noun: quisler. However, the verb form was rare even during World War II and has entirely disappeared from contemporary usage.

== Postwar use ==
Quisling was applied to some who cooperated with communist takeovers. As an illustration, the renegade social democrat Zdeněk Fierlinger of Czechoslovakia was frequently derided as "Quislinger" for his collaboration with the Communist Party of Czechoslovakia.

A 1966 Peanuts comic strip shows Lucy dragging Linus out of Snoopy's doghouse yelling "Traitor! Quisling! Squealer!" at Snoopy for betraying him hiding there.

In the Doctor Who story Day of the Daleks (1972), the Doctor calls a man who collaborates with the Daleks a Quisling.

"The Patriot Game", one of the best known songs to emerge from the Irish nationalist struggle, includes, in some versions, the line "...those quislings who sold out the Patriot Game" (the original uses "cowards" and other versions substitute "rebels" or "traitors").

In "Edge of Darkness", the 1943 film with Errol Flynn and Ann Sheridan a clip from radio speech by Winston Churchill quotes him as saying, "...and the filthy Quisling that is his tool.". Errol Flynn also tells a traitorous character that, "Soon all Norway will know he's a Quisling.".

In the Norwegian television series Occupied, Norwegians who are seen as collaborating with the Russian invaders and later with European Union peacekeepers are called Quislings.

Max Brooks' 2006 novel World War Z features survivors who lose their minds due to the apocalypse and pretend to be zombies themselves, even going so far as to biting and eating other survivors. These zombie-like survivors are called Quislings.

In the epilogue of Farnham's Freehold by Robert A. Heinlein, a sign is posted listing available goods and services. One of the items listed is "Jerked Quisling (by the neck)".

== 21st century ==
In the early 21st century, the term demonstrated continued currency as it was used by some American writers to describe President Donald Trump and his associates based on the idea that Russia interfered with the 2016 U.S. presidential election in favor of Donald Trump. For example, in a June 2018 New York Times column, Paul Krugman called US President Trump a "quisling", in reference to what Krugman described as Trump's "serv[ing] the interests of foreign masters at his own country's expense" and "defend[ing] Russia while attacking our closest allies". Other publications also applied the term. For instance, Joe Scarborough in The Washington Post ("These are desperate times for the quislings of Trump"), Rich Lowry in Politico ("The GOP elite... is the quisling establishment"), former United States Mint director Philip N. Diehl in The Hill ("The historical reference that more aptly applies to pro-Trump Republicans is that of the Quislings"), David Driesen in History News Network ("Trump seeks a government of quislings"), Dick Polman on NPR station WHYY-FM ("Ever since last summer, most Republicans have marinated in their cowardice... The next step toward home-grown tyranny – the quisling phase – has already begun"), and so forth.

On 7 July 2020, Lord Chris Patten, former governor of Hong Kong, described Carrie Lam, the Chief Executive of Hong Kong, as a "lamentable Quisling figure in Hong Kong's history". On 10 February 2022, Patten expanded his use of the term Quislings to describe Lam, the Hong Kong Police Force, and the Judiciary of Hong Kong, during a debate on Nationality and Borders Bill.

== See also ==
- Collaborationism
- Eponym vs. Namesake
- Fifth column
- Mir Jafar
- Treason
- Chinilpa
- Hanjian
- Malinchism
- Wang Jingwei
- Benedict Arnold
- Jayachandra
- Robert Lundy
