= Vermont Times =

Former newspaper in Vermont, US

- Type: Weekly newspaper
- Founded: 1990; 36 years ago
- Headquarters: Shelburne, Vermont
- OCLC number: 38845878

Vermont Times was a weekly newspaper based in Shelburne, Vermont. It ran from 1990 until 2007, and merged with the Addison Eagle in March 2009. It was owned by New Market Press, Inc.

The paper covered the town of Shelburne in Chittenden County, Vermont. It also went by the name of Burlington Vermont Times. The paper merged with South County Sentinel to form Vermont Times Sentinel. Vermont Times merged with the Addison Eagle in 2009.

== History ==
Vermont Times published the first issue of its weekly paper in late September 1990. It was started by Suzanne Gillis, who began Vermont Times's free distribution along with co-publisher Nat Winthrop after Gillis's Vermont Woman monthly was discontinued in July. While Gillis assumed the position of publisher, Winthrop—also then publisher of The Vanguard—served as chief operating officer. Additionally, Neil Arthur—advertising sales manager of 18 weekly Ohio publications—became the businesses executive vice president. The business was named NSN Enterprises. A prospectus released in March 1990 predicted that Vermont Times would be distributed free to 47,000 households in Chittenden County.

The weekly publication immediately felt the impact of recession, responding by cutting its initial operating costs by 20 percent and laying off two part-time employees. The Burlington Free Press covered the story in February 1991, explaining that Gillis and Winthrop were expecting a difficult economy when making plans for their publication, but not to the extent that presented itself.

In July 1995, shortly after making an unsuccessful attempt to sell the paper at 50 cents a piece, Vermont Times was sold to a New York firm. Edward Coats became the new owner of the paper along with another Vermont paper, Vox. Coats stated that he planned to continue the paper and that he was not intending on laying anyone working for the paper off. Out of the 15 people that were working for the paper, about half left right as Coats took over. "There were some good people who left, I'll be the first to admit it, and some who could have certainly helped us in the short term but for whatever reason didn't want to work for us," Coats recalled, stating "they thought we were the bad guys." Once he bought the paper, Coats focused on decreasing expenses. According to him, the former owners were spending more than they were making. Coats trimmed circulation. He also worked to switch it over from being a columnist paper to a community paper. He assigned the position of editor to Rosalyn Graham and general manager to Tom Schmidt.

In March 2000, Coats was still discussing his desire to shift the image of Vermont Times to that of a community paper. In The Burlington Free Press, he is quoted saying "Somehow we've always been pigeonholed into people telling us we're an alternative paper, and we're not; we're a community paper." Shay Totten, who was fired from the Times in February 2000, is quoted in the same article saying that Vermont Times is nowhere near alternative, and that its issues and stories are important and relevant to the community.

Vermont Times merged with Addison Eagle in 2009.
