= Suzanne Gillis =

American publisher

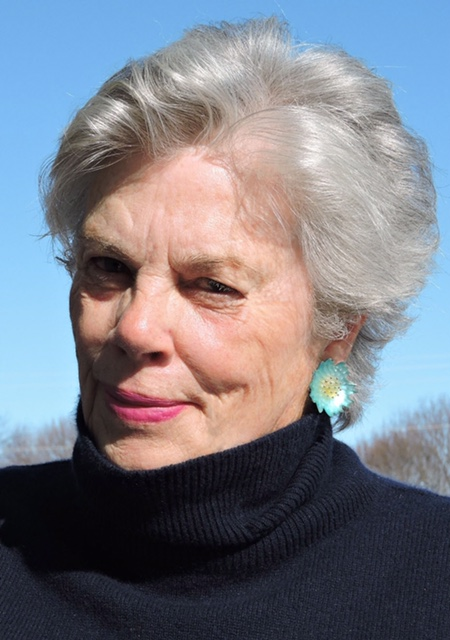
Gillis in 2020

Suzanne Gillis (Sue) is an American publisher and founder of four publications, Vermont Woman 1985, Vermont Times 1990, Provincetown Banner 1995, and Vermont Woman 2003. Gillis was born in Orangeburg, South Carolina and is a 1962 graduate of Torrington High School, Torrington, Ct, and the University of Vermont (BA Political Science 1981.) Gillis is a long time resident of Vermont.

== History of publications ==
As a founding publisher, Gillis was responsible for the publication's creation, investor funding, and overall management. Each publication has its own story and history. Both Vermont Woman and the Provincetown Banner are recipients of multiple industry awards from the New England Newspaper and Press Association. Vermont Woman was a designated women's advocacy newspaper, published for a period spanning 34 years and is considered the longest-running publication of its kind in the United States. Vermont Woman closed in 2019. Vermont Woman still has an online presence. www.vermontwoman.com Many articles from 2004-2019 are available on the Vermont Woman website.

Gillis' Publications
Publication	Type	Years active
Vermont Woman	Published Monthly	1985-1990
Vermont Times	Community Weekly	1990-1996
Provincetown Banner	Community Weekly	1995-1996
Vermont Woman	Published Monthly	2003-2019

== Awards ==
In 1996, the weekly Provincetown Banner received Newspaper of the Year from the New England Newspaper and Press Association. Vermont Woman newspaper has won a number of awards, including the New England Newspapers and Press Association's designation of New England Newspaper of the Year in 2007, 2008, and in 2011.

=== New England Newspaper and Press Association Awards ===
Year	Award	Place	Recipient
2011	Newspaper of the Year	--	Vermont Woman
2009	General Excellence	1st	Vermont Woman
2008	Newspaper of the Year	--	Vermont Woman
2007	Newspaper of the Year	--	Vermont Woman
2006	General Excellence	3rd	Vermont Woman
1996	Newspaper of the Year	--	Provincetown Banner

== Vermont Woman Speaker Series ==
In 1986, Vermont Woman newspaper hosted a lecture series which ran until 2009. This series featured speakers like Ann Richards, Valerie Plame Wilson, Gloria Steinem, and Helen Thomas.

Ref	Program Name
1	Vermont Woman Series- Gov. Ann Richards
2	Chocolate And Jazz Festival - Vermont Woman of the Year
3	Media Makers: #8- Sue Gillis And Ricky Diamond, Vermont Woman
4	Vermont Woman Interview
5	Vermont Woman 3rd Anniversary w/ Helen Thomas
6	Local Media Show: The Vermont Woman
7	Sandy Baird Commentary: Abortion In Film- A Woman's Right Not To Choose
8	Helen Thomas-Vermont Woman Lecture Series
9	International Women's Day Celebration In Burlington
10	ERA Public Speakout
11	Gloria Steinem - Outrageous Acts for Simple Justice
12	Gloria Steinem For Sanders For Congress
13	Valerie Plame Wilson - Taking on the White House

== Professional recognition ==
In 2010, Gillis was inducted in the New England Newspaper Hall of Fame for her commitment to independent publishing and for providing a forum for women's voices and perspectives. Burlington, Vermont held a city-wide celebration to honor and ensure the rights of all women and girls to lead secure, creative, healthy and free lives. The March 7, 2018 honorees included Sue Gillis, publisher of Vermont Woman.

== Personal life ==
Gillis retired in 2019, lives on Lake Champlain in South Hero, Vermont.
