= Clifton, Kentucky =

Unincorporated community in Kentucky, United States

- Unincorporated community
- Location within Kentucky
- Coordinates: 37°38′58″N 84°41′17″W
- Country: United States
- State: Kentucky
- County: Boyle
- Elevation: 856 ft (261 m)
- Time zone: UTC-5 (Eastern (EST))
  - Summer (DST): UTC-4 (EDT)
- Area code: 859
- GNIS feature ID: 507716

Clifton is a historically African American unincorporated community in Boyle County, Kentucky, United States.

== See also ==
- Clifford K. Berryman
- Clifton Baptist Church Complex
