= Alan Bjerga =

American journalist

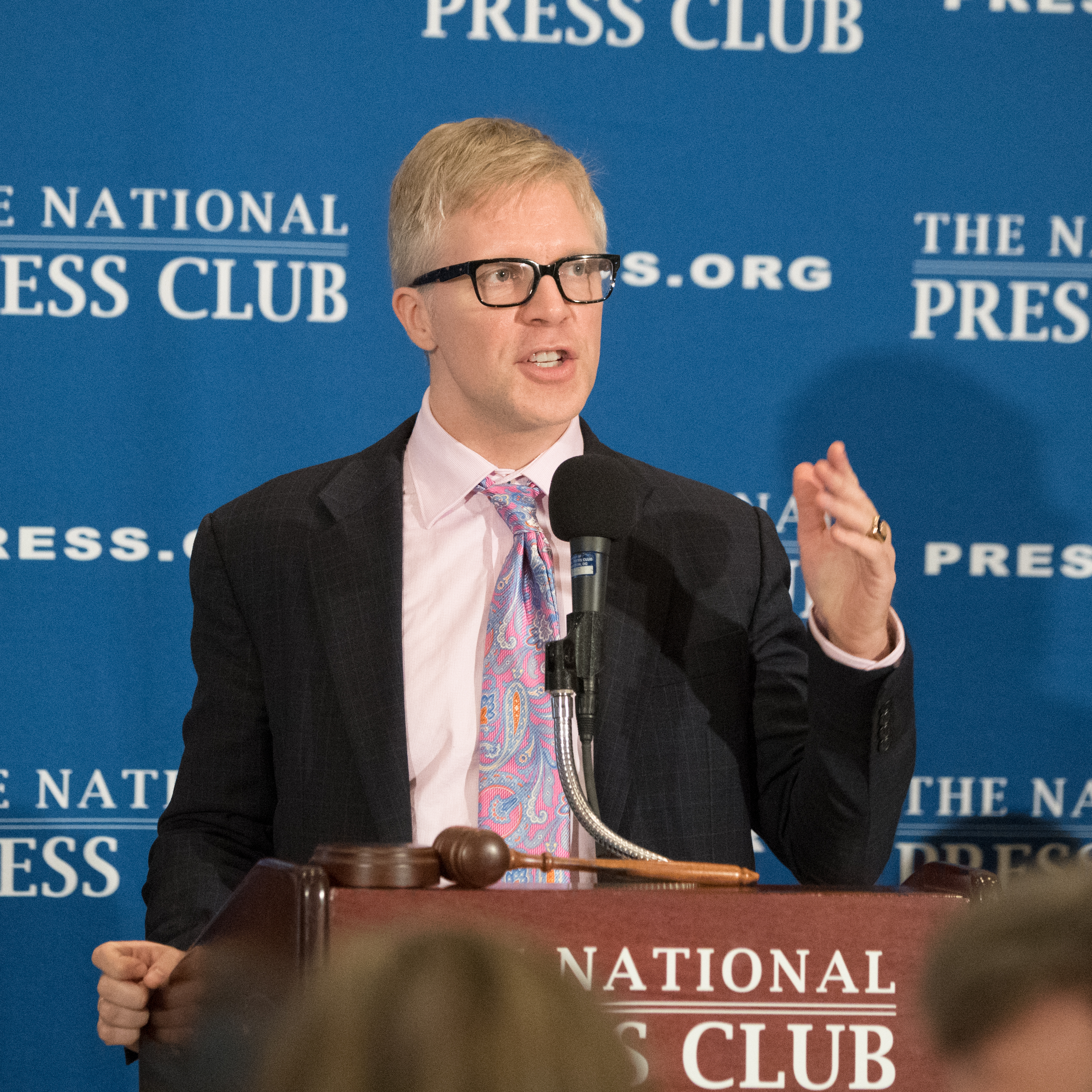
Bjerga in 2017

Alan Bjerga (born 1973) is an American journalist, author of the book Endless Appetites: How the Commodities Casino Creates Hunger and Unrest. He also covers global food policy for Bloomberg News and is a journalism instructor at Georgetown University, where in 2016 he received a department award for dedication to student learning. In 2010 he served as president of the National Press Club and was president of the North American Agricultural Journalists in 2010-2011.

== Biography ==
Bjerga, who grew up on a farm near the town of Motley, Minnesota, went to Concordia College (Minnesota) where he earned a bachelor's degree in history and English literature and edited the student newspaper, The Concordian. He earned a master's degree in mass communication from the University of Minnesota, where he was the managing editor of The Minnesota Daily. In 2012 he was an inaugural winner of the university's award for outstanding journalism alumni under 40, and in 2013 received Concordia College's annual "Sent Forth" award given to an outstanding young alumnus.

Bjerga began his career with the St. Paul Pioneer Press (Minn.) and also reported for the Sioux Falls (S.D.) Argus Leader and The Wichita Eagle (Kan.).

Alan Bjerga was a contestant on the game show, "Who Wants To Be A Millionaire?" where he won $50,000. He was a second-place finisher on Jeopardy!' At his National Press Club inaugural on January 30, 2010, he played guitar and sang lead vocals with "Honky Tonk Confidential", a retro/alt country band with songs written by former CBS Face the Nation anchor, Bob Schieffer. He has also competed for the standup comedy title of "DC's Funniest Journalist."

== Awards ==
Bjerga has been recognized for his work with awards from the Society of American Business Editors and Writers, the New York Press Club, the Kansas Press Association, the North American Agricultural Journalists, and the Overseas Press Club. He has commented on food and agriculture for Bloomberg Television, National Public Radio, the BBC and PBS Newshour, among other programs. Bjerga won the NAAJ's top writing award in 2005 while working for the Knight-Ridder Washington Bureau, where as a Midwest correspondent also covered foreign policy issues including defense contracting and intelligence related to the Iraq war.
