= Joel Pett =

American cartoonist

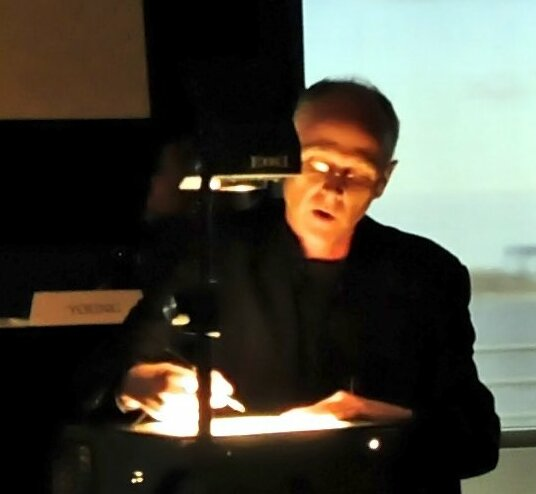
- Pett drawing at an event in 2009
- Born: Joel W. Pett; September 1, 1953 (age 73) Bloomington, Indiana, USA
- Area: cartoonist
- Notable works: Editorial cartoons

Joel W. Pett (born September 1, 1953) is an American Pulitzer Prize-winning editorial cartoonist who formerly worked for the Lexington Herald-Leader. His cartoons are syndicated by Tribune Content Agency.

Pett's cartoons have appeared in hundreds of websites, newspapers and magazines worldwide, including The Washington Post, The New York Times, the Los Angeles Times, The Boston Globe, San Francisco Chronicle, Le Monde and many more.

== Biography ==
Pett was born in Bloomington, Indiana. He moved to Ibadan, Nigeria, with his family in 1959 before returning to America in 1964.

After college at Indiana University, he began doing freelance cartooning jobs for over nine years. In April 1984, he joined the Lexington Herald-Leader as their staff cartoonist.

On July 11, 2023, he was let go by the owner of the Herald-Leader, McClatchy Newspapers. (The editorial cartoonists of two other newspapers owned by McClatchy, Jack Ohman at the Sacramento Bee and Kevin Siers at the Charlotte Observer, also received notice on that day.)

== What if it's a big hoax and we create a better world for nothing? cartoon ==
"What if it's a big hoax and we create a better world for nothing?"

Pett is perhaps best known for his cartoon featuring an attendee at a climate summit asking What if it's a big hoax and we create a better world for nothing?. The cartoon, which first appeared in USA Today in December 2009, around the time of the 2009 United Nations Climate Change Conference, depicts a conference presenter listing the many advantages of curbing climate change including "energy independence, preserving rainforests, sustainability, green jobs, livable cities, renewables, clean water/air, healthy children, etc., etc.," only to have a climate change denier interject that if it were all a hoax, we'd create a "better world for nothing". Shortly after the conference was over, Pett got a request for a signed copy from then-EPA administrator Lisa P. Jackson, who framed the comic and put it on her wall. Pett has repeatedly gotten requests from over 40 environmental groups, in the United States, Canada and Europe to use the cartoon in campaigns. The Australian Greens used it in a campaign which some have claimed was influential in the Australian parliament adopting a carbon pricing scheme under the Clean Energy Act 2011, said to be the most rigorous scheme in the world for the time it was active.

"I've drawn 7,000 cartoons in my life, but really only one," Pett said. "It's an example of one of these ideas I had in my head for 10 years before I realized I hadn't cartooned it...I was thinking, you know, 'It doesn't matter if global warming were a hoax, if the scientists made it up, we still have to do all that shit.'" Pett said in a 2012 editorial that in the 27 months since its first publication, not a week had gone by where he didn't have a request to use the image.

== Awards and honors ==
Pett has been a Pulitzer finalist in 4 different decades: 1989, 1998, 2000 and 2013, and was the winner in 2000. He has also been honored with 5 Global Media Awards for cartoons on population issues, two Robert F. Kennedy Journalism Award for cartoons highlighting the plight of the disadvantaged, and an Emmy for television commentary, among other citations.

He is a past president of the Association of American Editorial Cartoonists, and a past Pulitzer juror. He has conducted three overseas seminars on editorial cartooning as a guest speaker for the U.S. State Department.
