= James T. Berryman =

American cartoonist (1902–1971)

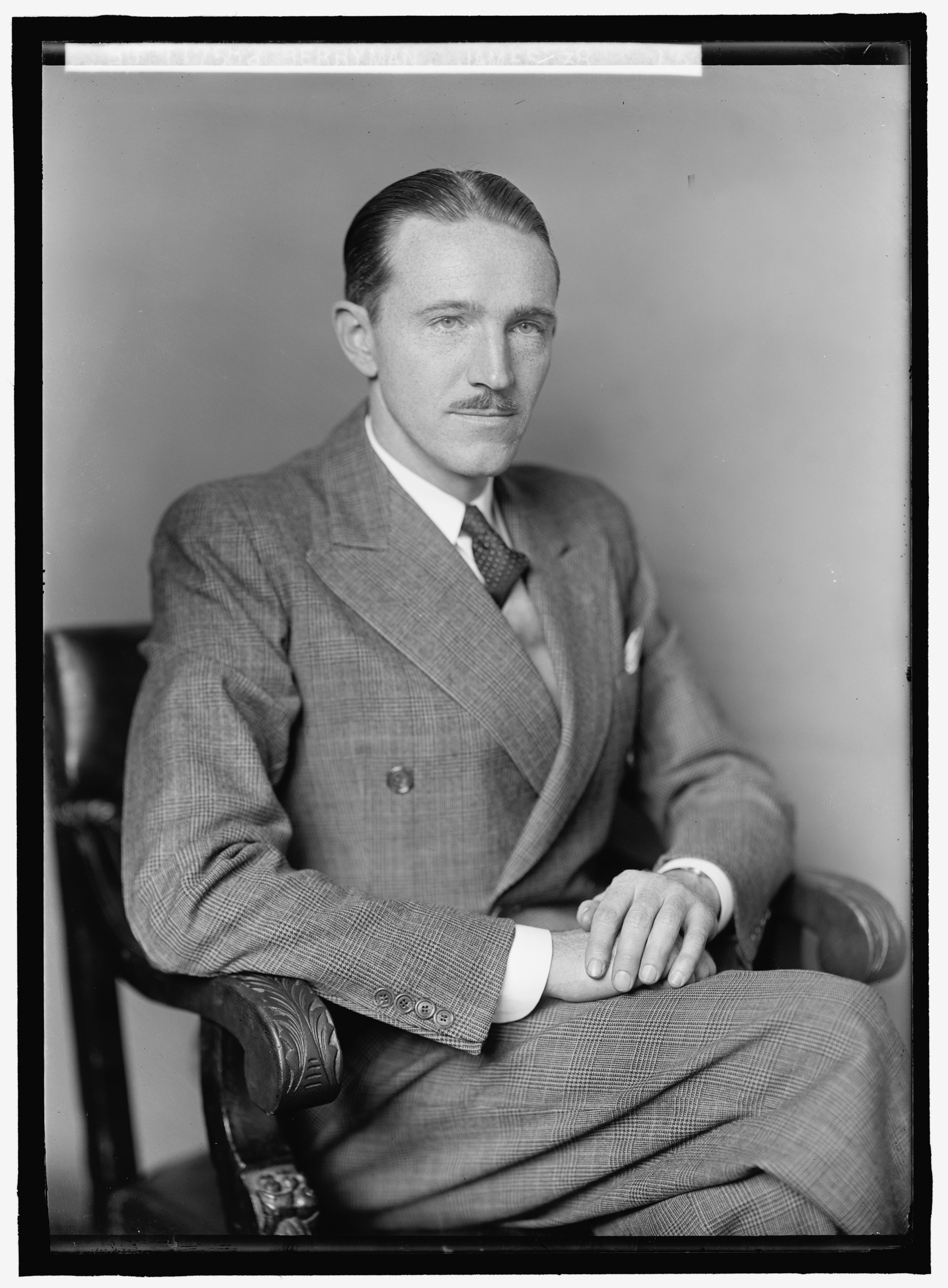
Berryman in 1921

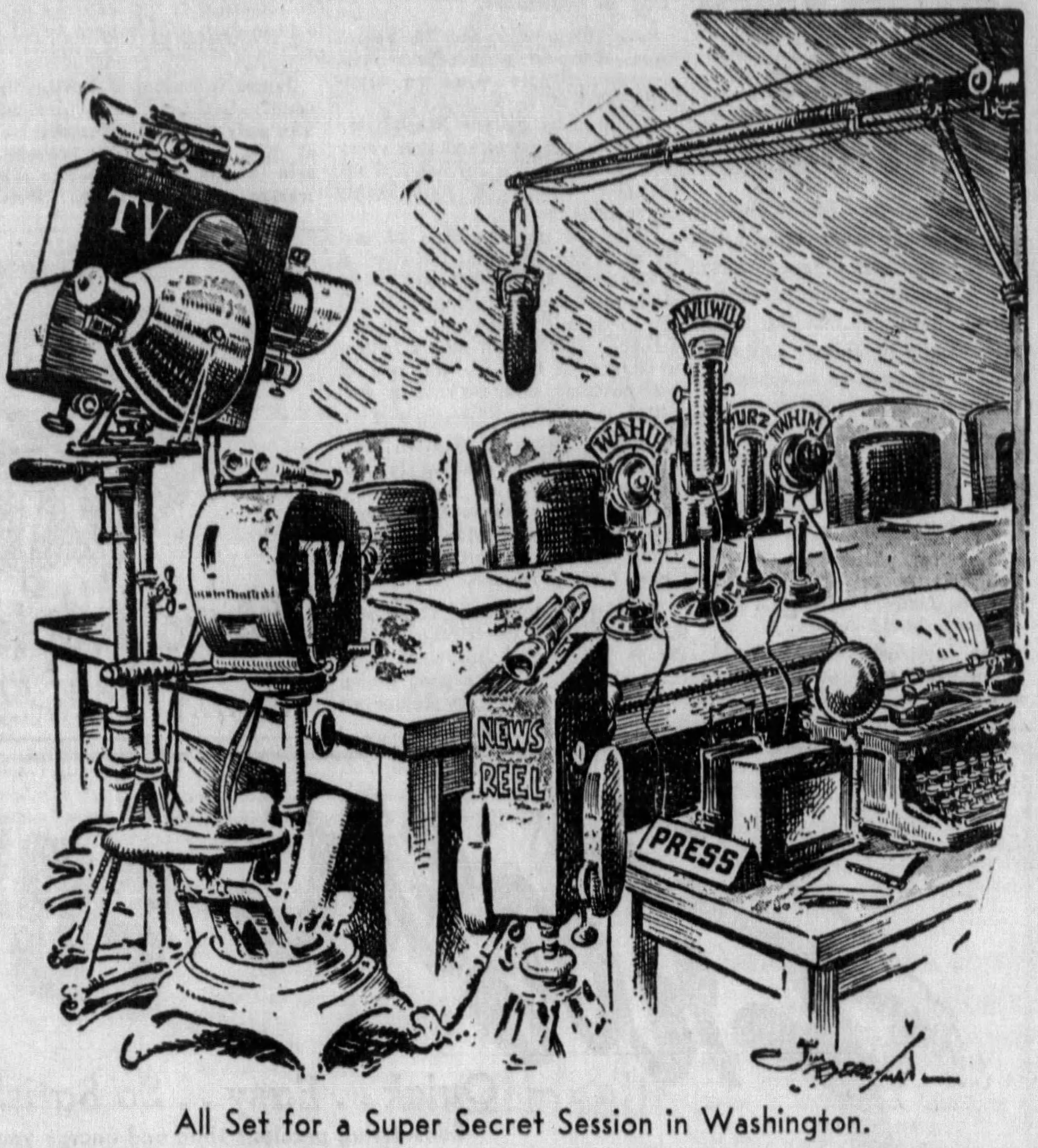
"All Set for a Super-Secret Session in Washington" (1949), Berryman's Pulitzer Prize-winning cartoon

James Thomas Berryman (June 8, 1902 – August 12, 1971) was an American political cartoonist who won the 1950 Pulitzer Prize for Editorial Cartooning. Born in Washington, D.C., Berryman was the son of Clifford Berryman, also a Pulitzer Prize-winning cartoonist. The two Berrymans are the only parent-child pair to win Pulitzer Prizes in the same category.
