= Randall Enos =

American illustrator and cartoonist

- Born: January 30, 1936 (age 90) New Bedford, Massachusetts, U.S.
- Area: Cartoonist
- Notable works: Chicken Gutz
- Spouse: Leann

Randall Enos (born January 30, 1936) is an American illustrator and cartoonist.

Enos was born in New Bedford, Massachusetts. Throughout his career, which began in the 1960s, Enos has worked mostly in linocuts.

Enos's work has appeared in the National Lampoon (where he produced the monthly strip Chicken Gutz in the 1970s), The Nation, the New York Times, Playboy, Time, Sports Illustrated, The Atlantic, Rolling Stone and other publications. His work is syndicated by Cagle Cartoons.

Enos has taught at colleges and art schools including Parsons School of Design, Philadelphia University of the Arts, RISD, Syracuse University, and others and has illustrated many books, including children's books. Enos, who (being from New Bedford) is interested in whaling history and collects whaling memorabilia, collaborated with Brian Heinz on the 2014 book Mocha Dick, contributing his abstract-folkish visual interpretations to the picture-book, a depiction of the historical whale which inspired the novel Moby Dick.

== Controversy ==
Enos caused controversy when a cartoon of his was published in the Bennington Banner following the 2017 Las Vegas shooting that depicted a pile of bodies with the caption "What happens in Vegas..." The paper later apologized for publishing the cartoon and stated that the cartoon was "insulting and in bad taste" and that "we regret and apologize for publishing the cartoon."

== Awards ==
Enos was nominated for the 2010 Advertising Illustration Award given by the National Cartoonist Society for his artwork promoting a revival of The Norman Conquests.

== Personal life ==
He lives on a horse farm in Connecticut with his wife Leann. His grandson, Klay, is a painter in New York.

== Books illustrated ==
- Seligson, Marcia; Gerberg, Mort; Corman, Avery (1967). You Have a Hang-Up If...:All About the Kookiness in People's Heads Today. Randall Enos (illustrator). Essandess Special Editions, a division of Simon & Schuster, Inc.
- (Uncredited) (October 1998). Getting the Best of Stress. Randall Enos (illustrator). Dartnell. ISBN 978-0850133431.
- Ald, Roy (1968). The Cheerful Cat Cookbook. Randall Enos (illustrator). Essandess Special Editions.
- Seaver, Joann Tuttle (1974). Workshop: I Hate Hats. Randall Enos (illustrator). D.C. Heath & Co. ISBN 978-0669878585.
- Supraner, Robyn (1976). It's not fair!. Randall Enos (illustrator). F. Warne.
- Kelly, Sean, ed. (1976). National Lampoon Songbook. Randall Enos, et al (illustrators). Cherry Lane Music Company.
- Reiser, Judy (1980). And I Thought I Was Crazy! Quirks, Idiosyncrasies and Meshugaas. Randall Enos (illustrator). Simon & Schuster. ISBN 978-0671253998.
- Avalos, Cecilia (1992). Yo Puedo Tambien - I Can Do It Too. Coleccion Iguana. Randall Enos (illustrator). Scholastic. ISBN 978-0590260381. (in Spanish)
- Phillips, Nathan (1996). Bird and Lizard. Watch Me Read. Randall Enos (illustrator). Houghton Mifflin. ISBN 978-0395766545.
- Menschell, Mindy (1997). Old Jack Fold. Spotlight Books, Phonics Books Grade 1, Level 5 Unit 2. Randall Enos (illustrator). Macmillan McGraw-Hill. ISBN 978-0021821235.
- Goodman, Gary S. (1997). Telemarketing for Non-Telemarketers. Randall Enos (illustrator). Dartnell. ISBN 978-0850132984.
- Pinczes, Elinor J. (2002). My Full Moon is Square. Randall Enos (illustrator). Houghton Mifflin Books for Children. ISBN 978-0618154890.
- Pinczes, Elinor J. (2003). Inchworm and A Half. Randall Enos (illustrator). HMH Books for Young Readers. ISBN 978-0618311019.
- Higgins, Maxwell (2004). How Paul Bunyan Made Crater Lake. Randall Enos (illustrator). Sundance Publishing. ISBN 978-0760878125.
- Heinz, Brian (2014). Mocha Dick: The Legend and Fury. Randall Enos (illustrator). Creative Editions. ISBN 978-1568462424.
