= Minnesota Daily =

Campus newspaper of the University of Minnesota

- Type: Biweekly student newspaper
- Format: Broadsheet
- Owner: Minnesota Daily Board of Directors
- Editor-in-chief: Tyler Church
- General manager: Charlie Weaver
- Founded: 1900; 126 years ago
- Language: American English
- Headquarters: Minneapolis, Minnesota
- Circulation: 10,000: Mondays & Thursdays during Fall/Spring semesters, 7,500: Wednesdays during summer semester
- Price: Free
- Website: www.mndaily.com

The Minnesota Daily is the campus newspaper of the University of Minnesota, published Monday and Thursday while school is in session, and published weekly on Wednesdays during summer sessions. Published since 1900, the paper is currently the largest student-run and student-written newspaper in the United States and the largest paper in the state of Minnesota behind The Minnesota Star Tribune and the St. Paul Pioneer Press. The Daily was named best daily college newspaper in the United States in 2009 and 2010 by the Society of Professional Journalists. The paper is independent from the university, but receives $500,000 worth of student service fees funding.

The Daily has a distribution of 12,150 copies per day (Monday and Thursday during the school year) and 10,000 copies per day (Wednesdays during summer) – available at over 200 locations on and near campus free of charge, as it is largely funded by advertising. A typical edition has about a dozen pages. The Daily also provides readers with several special issues, including voters guides, housing guides, survival guides (published the first day of school), "Best of" inserts via the Grapevine Awards Fair (recognizing local businesses) and even parody issues – distributed during finals weeks.

The Minnesota Daily is entirely student-run and student-written, employing more than 150 students with the guidance of a general manager and the governance of its board of directors. The newspaper dually operates as a training institution, providing students with real work experience in journalism, photography, editing, advertising sales, marketing, finance, graphic design, editorial and advertising production, human resources, information systems, public relations, survey research and web programming. In addition, many students gain leadership and delegation skills in the Daily's many management positions.

In May 2010, the Society of Professional Journalists named the Minnesota Daily the best all-around daily student newspaper in the country for the second year in a row.

== History ==
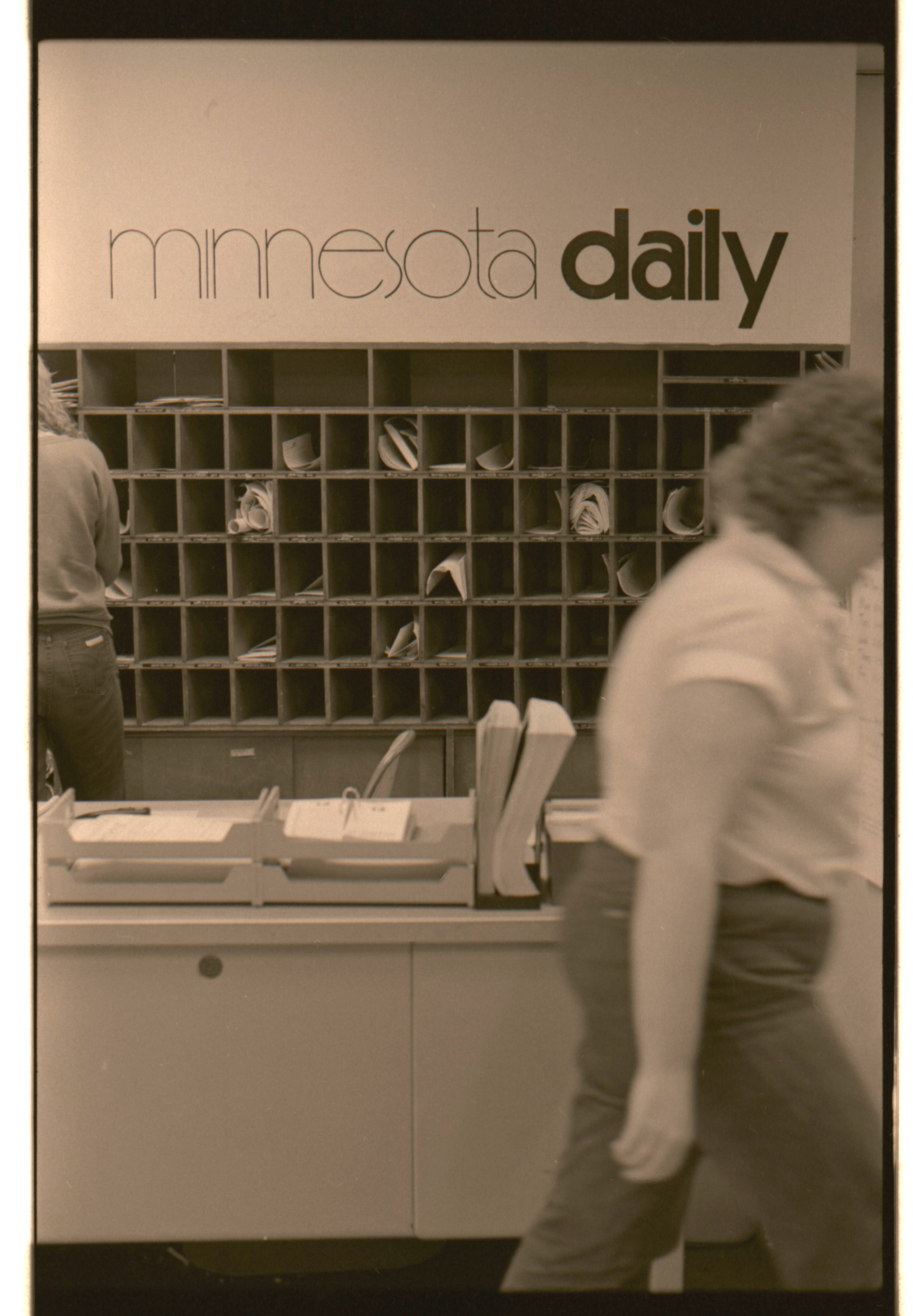
Minnesota Daily office in 1984

Starting in 1877, the student newspaper/magazine at the University of Minnesota was called the Ariel. In 1899, another local newspaper called Football was started by Horace Bagley, Mike Luby and Clarence Miller. Unlike the Ariel, it was published daily. In response, the publishers of the Ariel decided to become a daily paper as well, giving birth to the Minnesota Daily.

There have been a number of notable individuals to work at the paper, including former NAACP leader Roy Wilkins, longtime CBS correspondent Harry Reasoner, radio personality Garrison Keillor and musician Bob Dylan.

The Minnesota Daily was the first college newspaper to provide access to its coverage via the Internet in 1990. The Daily website publishes each day's stories in addition to exclusive web videos, photo slideshows, and additional features.

In 2001, the popular "A&E" section of the Daily was suddenly shut down by student managers of the paper, which generated much criticism among readers and Daily alumni. Garrison Keillor, who had written for the section while a student at the university, said the choice to shutter the section "is not a decision that journalists would have made, and it diminishes the prestige of the paper." The section was quickly reestablished.

In early March 2020, the Minnesota Daily published what would be become its last print edition. Over the course of the COVID-19 pandemic, the newspaper ceased printing and switched to an online-only publication.

== Notable alumni ==
- Chris Ison- Pulitzer Prize–winning journalist for the Star Tribune. Worked as an editor at the Minnesota Daily and is currently a faculty member at the SJMC. Often regales stories of his time at the Daily as he teaches.
- Alan Bjerga, 2010 president of the National Press Club
- Brian J. Coyle, an American community leader, elected official, and gay activist and writer for the Minnesota Daily in the 1960s
- Keith Maurice Ellison, an American lawyer, politician, and a Democratic member of Congress. While a law student in 1989 and 1990, Ellison wrote several columns as Keith E. Hakim in the Minnesota Daily
- Dick Guindon, American cartoonist best known for his gag panel, Guindon, and cartoonist at the Minnesota Daily
- Robert E. Hillard founder of the public relations agency Fleishman-Hillard in St. Louis, Missouri and editor-in-chief of the Minnesota Daily from 1938 to 1939
- James Lileks, an American journalist, columnist, and blogger and columnist at the Minnesota Daily who wrote under the pen name "James r. Lileks"
- Maud Hart Lovelace, American author best known for the Betsy-Tacy series and former employee of the Minnesota Daily
- Jack Ohman, an American editorial cartoonist and employee for the Daily
- Joe Roche, Iraq War veteran and political commentator who wrote a column for the Daily in the 1990s
- Steve Sack, an American cartoonist who draws the cartoon activity panel Doodles. His editorial cartoons for the Minneapolis Star Tribune won a Pulitzer Prize in 2013. He illustrated features and drew editorial cartoons at the Minnesota Daily
- Eric Sevareid, a CBS journalist who was denied the editor-in-chief spot at the Minnesota Daily by university administration following a controversial column in 1934
- Hugh Smith, news anchor at WTVT in Tampa, Florida from 1963 to 1991 and editor-in-chief of the Minnesota Daily during the 1955–56 academic year.
- Ka Vang, Hmong playwright, fiction writer and poet and reporter at the Daily
- William Wade, American war correspondent during World War II and copy desk chief at the Minnesota Daily from 1936 to 1939
- Roy Wilkins, a prominent civil rights activist in the United States from the 1930s to the 1970s and the first black journalist at the Minnesota Daily

== See also ==
- City Pages
- MinnPost.com
- St. Paul Pioneer Press
- Star Tribune
- List of newspapers published in Minnesota
