= Clifton Baptist Church Complex =

Historic church in Kentucky, United States

- U.S. National Register of Historic Places
- Location within Kentucky Location within the United States
- Location: Clifton Rd., 1 mile (1.6 km) northeast of Kentucky Route 52, near Clifton, Kentucky
- Coordinates: 37°38′49″N 84°41′30″W
- Area: 2 acres (0.81 ha)
- Built: 1886
- NRHP reference No.: 98000085
- Added to NRHP: February 12, 1998

Clifton Baptist Church Complex is a historic church and school complex which is virtually the only remnant of the historic African-American hamlet of Clifton, Kentucky, a community formed after the American Civil War. The church and the school were built in 1886. Other contributing resources in the complex are a dining hall, a privy, a cemetery, a plank fence and a rock fence. The complex was added to the National Register of Historic Places in 1998.

== See also ==
- National Register of Historic Places listings in Kentucky
