= National Lampoon Songbook =

- Language: English
- Genre: humor
- Publisher: National Lampoon
- Publication date: 1976
- Publication place: United States

National Lampoon Songbook was an American humorous songbook which was issued in 1976. Although it appears to be a book in its own right, it was a "special issue" of National Lampoon magazine and as such it was only sold on newsstands. People who had a subscription to the magazine would still have to buy these special issues; they were not included in the subscription.

Many of the songs in the songbook were from the musical stage show, Lemmings. A few other songs, including the whole musical "Moby!" were from The National Lampoon Radio Hour. Other songs were from the album Goodbye Pop. There were also some visual print pieces (illustrations and photographs) included. The first piece in the songbook is Deteriorata, which was on the album Radio Dinner. The musical arrangements were by Dan Fox.

The songbook was edited by Sean Kelly. The cover illustrations was a drawing showing a number of musicians on stage and a row of the audience. The drawing was a group effort by cartoonists Randall Enos, Gahan Wilson, Bobby London, Jeff Jones, Shary Flenniken and Charles Rodrigues. The songbook was designed by the design studio Pellegrini, Kaestle & Gross, Inc.

== Songs ==
1. Deteriorata, a parody of Desiderata
2. Lemmings Lament, a parody of Woodstock (song)
3. Pizza Man, a parody of 1950s death songs such as Leader of the Pack
4. Nirvana Banana, a parody of Donovan
5. Colorado, A Parody of John Denver
6. Positively Wall Street, a parody of Bob Dylan
7. Pull the Tregroes, a parody of Joan Baez
8. Papa was a Running-Dog Lackey of the Bourgeoisie, a parody of Motown music
9. Highway Toes, a parody of James Taylor
10. Lonely at the Bottom, a parody of Joe Cocker and Leon Russell
11. Megadeath, a parody of heavy metal (music)
12. Overdose Heaven
13. Well-Intentioned Blues, a parody of Pete Seeger
14. Closet Queen, a parody of a lounge singer
15. The Ballad of K. C. River Rat, a parody of a trucker song
16. Saint Leonard's Song, a parody of Leonard Cohen
17. Mother Goose's Wine
18. Riding Out on a Rail, parody of the Grateful Dead
19. Bleeding Heart, A parody of Cat Stevens
20. Psychology Ptoday Blues (Every Day I Feel Depressed), Chicago blues style
21. Methadone Maintenance Man, A parody of James Taylor
22. Goodbye Pop, a parody of Elton John
23. Kung Fu Christmas, A parody of disco ballad style
24. The B Side of Love, a parody of country music
25. I'm a Woman, a parody of I am Woman
26. Old Maid (Southern California Brings Me Down), a parody of Neil Young
27. Art Rock Suite, a parody of mid-70s Art rock
28. Down to Jamaica, a reggae and Bob Dylan parody
29. Moby!, the novel Moby Dick as musical theatre

- All Ashore
- Call Me Ishmael
- Seaman's Lexicon
- The Unhappiest Man at Sea
- The Present
- You're Never Too Old to Love
- All Hands on Me
- Moby
- You're Never Too Old to Love (reprise)
