= Bob Englehart =

American editorial cartoonist

- Born: November 7, 1945 (age 79); Fort Wayne, Indiana, US
- Occupation: Editorial cartoonist
- Years active: 1969–2015
- Employer(s): The Hartford Courant; Dayton Journal Herald

Bob Englehart (born 1945) is a retired American editorial cartoonist for the Hartford Courant. He was a Pulitzer Prize finalist in 1979.

== Biography ==
Born on November 7, 1945, in Fort Wayne, Indiana, Englehart dropped out of the American Academy of Art in 1967 to join the staff of Chicago Today, where he published his first editorial cartoons. In 1972, he returned to Fort Wayne to start a small commercial art studio and work as a freelance artist for The Journal-Gazette. Influences included Pat Oliphant, Wayne Stayskal, Mike Peters, Jeff MacNelly, Paul Coker Jr. and Jim Borgman.

From 1975 to 1980, he served as editorial cartoonist for the Journal-Herald in Dayton, Ohio. He spent the next 35 years of his career as the first full-time editorial cartoonist for the Hartford Courant from December 15, 1980, until the end of 2015, when he accepted a voluntary buyout plan.

Englehart's cartoons have appeared in The New York Times, USA Today, Time, Newsweek, Sports Illustrated, Playboy, and Hustler. His works are held in the collections of the University of Connecticut, Eastern Connecticut State University, the Connecticut Historical Society, Ohio State University, Indiana University–Purdue University, and the Newseum. His work is syndicated by Cagle Cartoons.

== Personal life ==
Englehart is married to Pat McGrath. They live in Middletown and have three adult children, four grandchildren and one great-grandchild. He has characterized his political philosophy as "moderately confused."
