= Vermont Woman =

American monthly newspaper

- Type: Monthly/quarterly
- Format: Tabloid, Digital
- Owner: Suzanne Gillis
- Publisher: Suzanne Gillis
- Editor: Kate Mueller
- Founded: 1985-2019
- Ceased publication: 2019
- Headquarters: 307 Route 2, South Hero, Vermont United States)
- Circulation: 10,000
- Website: https://www.vermontwoman.com

Vermont Woman, a monthly newspaper, was published in South Hero, Vermont. Its circulation was 10,000.

== History ==
The founder and publisher of Vermont Woman, a monthly newspaper, was Suzanne (Sue) Gillis. Gillis financially backed the paper. In 1990, the paper was shut down due to financial challenges. Gillis then went on to become the founding publisher for the community weekly newspaper, Vermont Times. In 1995, Gillis became the founding publisher of the award-winning community weekly, Provincetown Banner. Thirteen years later, in 2003, Vermont Woman was re-launched by Gillis. The paper has since won a number of awards, including the New England Newspapers and Publishers Association's designation of New England Newspaper of the Year in 2007, 2008, and in 2011.

In 2010, Gillis was inducted in the New England Newspapers Hall of Fame for her commitment to independent publishing and for providing a forum for women's voices and perspectives. Rickey Gard Diamond, was the first editor of the paper, which launched in 1985 with 44 pages and an initial circulation of 20,000. In 2012, long-time editor Rickey Gard Diamond and Vermont Woman, won a national award from the National Newspapers Association, 3rd place in the category of Best Investigative or In-Depth Story or Series, Non-daily Division, circulation 10,000 or more.

Vermont Woman published its final issue on September 9, 2019.

Vermont Woman hosted a lecture series from 1986 to 2009. This series featured speakers like Ann Richards, Valerie Plame Wilson, Gloria Steinem, and Helen Thomas.

== Vermont Woman Speaker Series ==
Videos are courtesy of CCTV Archives, CCTV Center for Media & Democracy.

Ref	Program Name	Link to Program at CCTV-Vermont
1	Vermont Woman Series- Gov. Ann Richards	Link to video
2	Chocolate And Jazz Festival - Vermont Woman of the Year	Link to video
3	Media Makers: #8- Sue Gillis And Ricky Diamond, Vermont Woman	Link to video
4	Vermont Woman Interview	Link to video
5	Vermont Woman 3rd Anniversary w/ Helen Thomas	Link to video
6	Local Media Show: The Vermont Woman	Link to video
7	Sandy Baird Commentary: Abortion In Film- A Woman's Right Not To Choose	Link to video
8	Helen Thomas-Vermont Woman Lecture Series	Link to video
9	International Women's Day Celebration In Burlington	Link to video
10	ERA Public Speakout	Link to video
11	Gloria Steinem - Outrageous Acts for Simple Justice	Link to video
12	Gloria Steinem For Sanders For Congress	Link to video
13	Valerie Plame Wilson - Taking on the White House	Link to video

== Awards ==
=== New England Newspapers and Publishers Association Awards ===
Year	Award	Place	Recipient
2011	Newspaper of the Year	--	Vermont Woman
2009	General Excellence	1st	Vermont Woman
2008	Newspaper of the Year	--	Vermont Woman
2007	Newspaper of the Year	--	Vermont Woman
	Feature Photo	1st	Margaret Michniewicz
	Cover Story "Inconvenient Truth"	1st	Carrie Chandler
	Cover Story "Quest for the Cure"	3rd	Mary Fratini
	Feature Photo	2nd	Lynn Monty
2006	General Excellence	3rd	Vermont Woman
	Feature Writing	1st	Mary Fratini
	Headline Writing	1st	Margaret Michniewicz
	Photo - General News	3rd	Margaret Michniewicz
