= Rex Babin =

American editorial cartoonist (1962-2012)

- Born: August 17, 1962; Los Angeles, California, U.S.
- Died: March 30, 2012 (aged 49); Sacramento, California, U.S.
- Education: San Diego State University
- Occupation: Editorial cartoonist
- Spouse: Kathleen Babin
- Children: 1

Rex Babin (August 17, 1962 – March 30, 2012) was an American editorial cartoonist. He worked for The Denver Post from 1988 to 1989; the Times Union; and The Sacramento Bee from 1999 to 2012.

== Life and career ==
Rex Babin was born on August 17, 1962, in Walnut Creek, California. His father died when he was 4 years old and he was primarily raised my his mother. Babin graduated with a B.A. (1985) in English from San Diego State University. He was a strong advocate for the use of local cartoons, and typically drew three cartoons about California subjects per week.

In 1988 to 1989 Babin worked at The Denver Post in an interim capacity. Afterwards, he served as the editorial cartoonist of the Albany Times Union, before taking a position as a political cartoonist for The Sacramento Bee in 1999, replacing retiring cartoonist Dennis Renault. His innovative cartoons include "Caleeforneeya," a recurring satire of California Governor Arnold Schwarzenegger. Babin was the recipient of the National Press Foundation's 2001 Berryman Award; and a finalist for the Pulitzer Prize in 2003.

In 2009, Babin served as president of the Association of American Editorial Cartoonists.

== Death and legacy ==
Babin died from complications of stomach cancer at the age of 49.

A few months after his death, his colleague Jack Ohman took the role of editorial cartoonist at The Sacramento Bee. The California Museum held a posthumous exhibition of his art, Drawing Caleeforneeya: Political Cartoons of Rex Babin, 1999-2012 (2018).
