= Rayma Suprani =

Venezuelan artist

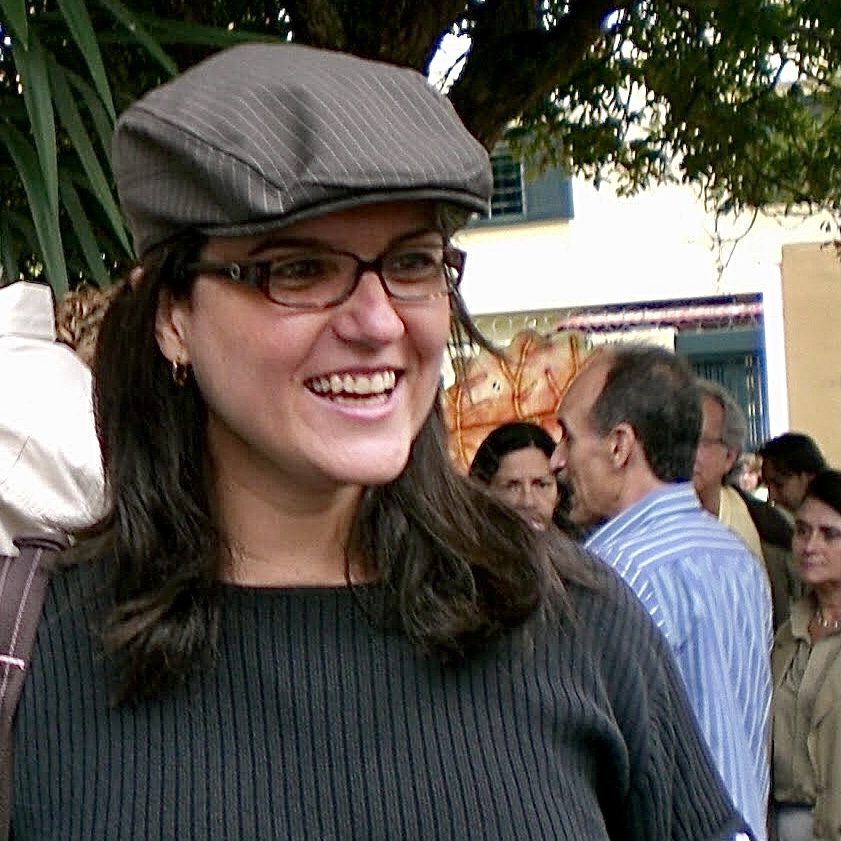
- Born: April 22, 1969 (age 56)
- Education: Central University of Venezuela
- Occupations: Cartoonist, activist
- Website: raymasuprani.com

Rayma Suprani (born 22 April 1969) is a Venezuelan cartoonist. In 2014 she was dismissed by the newspaper El Universal for drawing a cartoon criticizing the late president Hugo Chávez. While Chávez loyalists have had harsh words for her criticism of the regime, others have praised her for her “distinctive powers of observation” and “fine intelligence.” She was forced to leave the country and now lives in exile in Miami, Florida

The critic Alfonso Molina praised her work, writing that the “work of Rayma Suprani in El Universal unites intelligence, sensitivity and talent to express our life as a country through very sharp vignettes that are not intended to make us laugh but to make us think. Journalist and cartoonist, she manages to communicate her ideas in a very personal way, but always with a collective sense.”

== Early life and education ==
Born in Caracas, Venezuela, Suprani began painting as a teenager and trained for several years in the workshop of Pedro Centeno Vallenilla. When she took up cartooning, she gave up painting for a long time.

She graduated with a degree in journalism from the Central University of Venezuela.

== Career ==
At a very early age, she began to work for the journal Economics Today. She has worked at various newspapers in Caracas such as El Diaro Economica Hoy and El Diario de Caracas, she later became the principal cartoonist at El Universal. Suprani was El Universal's chief cartoonist for 19 years where she often faced criticism from state media and government supporters regarding her satirical cartoons.

=== Art exhibition ===
In 2012, having returned to large-format work, Suprani held her first solo exhibition, “Frente al espejo” (Facing the Mirror), at the Galería D’Museo del Centro de Arte Los Galpones de Los Dos Caminos. A writer for El Universal noted that Suprani's canvases displayed “the same critical spirit that has characterized her drawings and cartoons from the beginning. Scathing, sometimes. Ironic, sometimes. Corrosive, almost always.” “It is another Rayma Suprani,” wrote Alfonso Molina about the exhibition. The paintings, he maintained, represented “a demonstration of strength and courage that excited me, showed me another side of the same creator.”

=== Other activities ===
Suprani has also drawn magazine covers, and the best of her cartoons have been collected in books. She is an active member of the Cartooning for Peace Organization. She is one of several protagonists in the film Caricaturists—Foot Soldiers of Democracy, by Stéphanie Valloatto.

=== Dismissal ===
According to the Guardian, her last cartoon, published in El Universal on September 17, 2014, “showed a normal-looking electrocardiogram under the heading 'Health', and below it the late former president Hugo Chávez's signature merging with a flatlining heartbeat under the words 'Health in Venezuela'.” The cartoon, wrote the Guardian, “combined two nationally sensitive subjects: the legacy of Chávez, and the socialist government's management of the healthcare system.”

The Guardian noted that medical personnel had “long claimed the economic chaos engulfing the country has led to chronic shortages of drugs and medical supplies,” and further pointed out that since Chávez's death the previous year, “his signature, always printed in red, has become a symbol of loyalty to the leader....It has been stamped across buildings and can often be seen tattooed on the arms of his supporters.”

Only hours after the publication of the cartoon, Suprani was fired. “My immediate boss called me and told me he didn't like my caricature and I was out,” she said. “We've become a country where if you say things, have your own criteria and try to provoke reflection, it's not well viewed.” The Guardian stated that El Universal had recently been sold to “a little-known Spanish company called Epalistica, which employees at the newspaper allege is a front for a pro-government group of investors,” and that since the sale, the paper had shifted from an anti-government stance to a more government-friendly stance, resulting in the dismissal or resignation of several columnists. The newspaper El Tiempo also stated that since its change of ownership, El Universal had become more pro-government. “The government has gone and bought the news media that it can't silence,” Suprani said in an interview on Unionradio, noting the government's previous acquisition of Globovisión and of the newspapers that had formerly belonged to Cadena Capriles.

After the news of her dismissal was reported, Henrique Capriles and other opposition figures responded to Suprani's dismissal by tweeting their respect for her. Suprani herself wrote on Twitter that “we will carry on through other, smaller avenues but with endless creativity.”

Suprani was scheduled to speak at the Oslo Freedom Forum in May 2015 as well as the Freedom House organization on the subject of the defense of human rights.

== Personal life ==
Suprani has three dogs, Lucy, Blue and Churchill, and a cat named Osho.
