= Jack Ohman =

American cartoonist

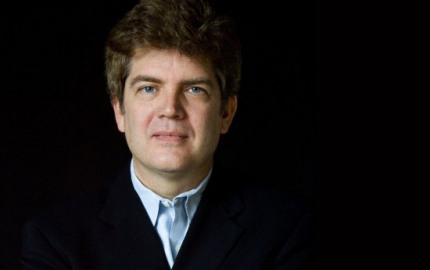
- Born: September 1, 1960 (age 66); Saint Paul, Minnesota, U.S.
- Education: Portland State University
- Occupation: Editorial cartoonist
- Employer(s): The San Francisco Chronicle, The Sacramento Bee, The Oregonian
- Spouse: Janice Dunham (divorced) Amanda Ohman (married 2016)
- Children: 3
- Awards: Pulitzer Prize for Editorial Cartooning (2016)

Jack Ohman (born September 1, 1960) is an American editorial cartoonist and educator. He is currently a contributing opinion columnist and cartoonist for the San Francisco Chronicle. He formerly worked for The Sacramento Bee and The Oregonian. His work is syndicated nationwide to over 300 newspapers by Tribune Media Services. In 2016, he was awarded the Pulitzer Prize for Editorial Cartooning.

== Early life and education ==
Jack Ohman was born on September 1, 1960, in Saint Paul, Minnesota. Ohman worked as a political aide for the Minnesota Democratic–Farmer–Labor Party (DFL) during his high school years in Minnesota. At age 17, Ohman worked at the Minnesota Daily, the student newspaper of the University of Minnesota. At age 19, Ohman was the youngest cartoonist ever to be nationally syndicated. His first daily newspaper job was at The Columbus Dispatch, where he was hired in 1981.

Ohman has a B.A. degree (1999) from Portland State University.

== Career ==
He worked at the Detroit Free Press starting in 1982; followed by work at The Oregonian in 1983. On October 29, 2012, it was announced that Ohman was stepping down as The Oregonian's editorial cartoonist; and was subsequently hired by The Sacramento Bee, in Sacramento, California following the death of Rex Babin.

Ohman was a regular art contributor to ABC News Nightline television show from 1984 until 1986. He was a regular contributor to Foreign Policy and Money magazines. Ohman is also the creator of the syndicated comic strip Mixed Media, which he drew from 1994 to 1999 and which appeared in over 170 newspapers.

In 1986, through sales of copies of his cartoons about the space shuttle Challenger accident, Ohman raised over $30,000 for the families of the astronauts. It was the fifth-largest private donation in the United States. In 2001, he raised over $30,000 for the United Way September 11 Fund.

His work regularly appears in most major U.S. newspapers including The New York Times, Chicago Tribune, The Washington Post, The Philadelphia Inquirer, and The Seattle Times. Ohman is also a noted fly fishing humorist, and has published four books on the subject, including the best-selling Fear of Fly Fishing, Get The Net, An Inconvenient Trout, and Angler Management, a book of essays. He has published 10 books overall.

On July 11, 2023, he was let go by the owner of the Sacramento Bee, McClatchy Newspapers. The editorial cartoonists of two other newspapers owned by McClatchy, Kevin Siers at the Charlotte Observer and Joel Pett at the Lexington Herald-Leader, also received notice on that day. On September 26, 2023, he was hired as a contributing opinion editor for the San Francisco Chronicle.

== Awards ==
Ohman has won the 1980 Sigma Delta Chi Mark of Excellence Award, the 1995 Thomas Nast Award from the Overseas Press Club, the 2001 Harrison E. Salisbury Award from the University of Minnesota, the 2002 National Headliner Award, the 2009 Robert F. Kennedy Journalism Award (Cartoon category), the 2010 Society of Professional Journalists Award, and the 2012 Scripps Howard Journalism Award. Ohman was a finalist for the 2012 Pulitzer Prize for Editorial Cartooning, where the judges cited his entry for his "clever daily cartoons and a distinctive Sunday panel on local issues in which his reporting was as important as his artistic execution." He was awarded the 2016 Pulitzer Prize for Editorial Cartooning for "cartoons that convey wry, rueful perspectives through sophisticated style that combines bold line work with subtle colors and textures."

In 2006, Ohman was voted one of the top five cartoonists in the United States by the readers of The Week magazine.

In 2019, Ohman was awarded an honorary degree by Portland State University, one of only two such degrees awarded that year.

In 2026, Ohman was awarded the Herblock Prize for editorial cartooning.

== Books ==
- Back to the '80s (1986)
- Drawing Conclusions (1987)
- Fear of Fly Fishing (1988)
- Fishing Bass-Ackwards (1991)
- Why Johnny Can't Putt... (1993)
- Media Mania (1995)
- Do I Have To Draw You a Picture? (1997)
- Get the Net! (1998)
- An Inconvenient Trout (2008)
- Angler Management (2009)
- Illustrator, Blowing Smoke: The Wild and Whimsical World of Cigars (1997), Brian McConnachie, author
