= Steve Sack =

American cartoonist (born 1953)

Steve Sack (born 1953) is an American cartoonist who won a 2013 Pulitzer Prize for editorial cartooning. With Chris Foote he draws the cartoon activity panel Doodles and he is editorial cartoonist for the Minneapolis Star Tribune, where he started in 1981. Doodles is distributed by Creators Syndicate. Sack's editorial cartoons are distributed by Cagle Cartoons.

== Life and career ==
Sack was born in Saint Paul, Minnesota. His newspaper career began while attending the University of Minnesota, where he illustrated features and drew editorial cartoons for the school paper, The Minnesota Daily. Two years later, he was hired as staff cartoonist for The Journal Gazette in Fort Wayne, Indiana.

After three years, Sack returned to Minnesota to join the Star Tribune. He is featured online by Daryl Cagle, another editorial cartoonist, who says:

Steve Sack is a wonderful cartoonist. He draws ... in a painterly, colorful style that is like no other cartoonist. I think of Steve as a 'stealth' cartoonist, because his drawing style is sweet, young and charming; but the sweet look is deceptive, Steve is actually one of the harshest cartoonists, skewering his political targets with little mercy.

Sack's interactive became the most popular thing ever on the Cagle website. It was introduced in 2000, and caused problems for the web servers because of the high volume of visitors. "The Haunted House returned" in 2005.

In his free time, Sack enjoys oil painting. He lives in the Twin Cities with his wife, Beth.

Sack announced his retirement from the Star Tribune in April 2022, due to the loss of use of his right arm, which was a long-term effect of cancer treatment.

In 2026, Sack announced that he would return to cartooning, publishing weekly comics at MinnPost.

== Awards ==
- 2013 Pulitzer Prize for Editorial Cartooning. The annual award cited Sack's work for the Star Tribune during 2012, "his diverse collection of cartoons, using an original style and clever ideas to drive home his unmistakable point of view." He had been a finalist for the 2004 Prize.
- 2006 Clifford K. and James T. Berryman Award. Awarded annually by the National Press Foundation for the nation's best editorial cartoonist, the award was endowed in 1989 by Florence Berryman, former art critic of the Washington Star in memory of her late father and brother, both of whom won the Editorial Cartooning Pulitzer.
- 2004 Scripps Howard Foundation, National Journalism Awards
- 2003 National Headliner Award
