= Dry Bones (comic strip) =

Comic strip

Dry Bones comic strip

Dry Bones is an English-language Israeli political cartoon strip by Yaakov Kirschen that was published by The Jerusalem Post from 1973 until 2023, and then by the Jewish News Syndicate from 2023 until Kirschen's death in 2025. Dry Bones was syndicated in North America by Cagle Cartoons.

Dry Bones was syndicated to Jewish community newspapers around the world and has been reprinted and quoted by The New York Times, Time magazine, the Los Angeles Times, The Wall Street Journal, CBS, the AP and Forbes. It offered a pictorial commentary on current events in Israel and the Jewish world.

== Name ==
The name of the comic strip refers to the vision of the Valley of Dry Bones in the Book of Ezekiel (37:1–14). The main character of the cartoon is Shuldig – Yiddish for guilty/to blame.

== Yaakov Kirschen ==
Yaakov Kirschen was born as Jerry Kirschen in Brooklyn, New York City, in 1938.

While studying art at Queens College, his first cartoons were published in Cracked magazine in 1960. After graduating in 1961, he landed a job drawing greeting cards for Norcross, but was soon fired for "jocular" behavior. Later, he worked for a company that produced self-instructional training courses for computer companies including NCR and IBM; but he continued freelancing as a cartoonist for magazines like Playboy.

In 1971, he moved to Israel with his wife and three children, and changed his name to Yaakov. He had hoped to work in computers, he once told the New York Times, but discovered that "what this country really needed was cartoons." He soon approached the Jerusalem Post with a strip inspired by the work of Jules Feiffer. The Post snapped it up, and Dry Bones debuted in 1973. The strip quickly became a hit.

A notable cartoon in 1979 lampooned U.S. President Jimmy Carter's demand that Israel withdraw from "occupied territory", by proposing that America return its own "occupied territories" to Mexicans and Native Americans. Carter responded to Kirschen with a note saying his satirical plan "would make my job much easier!"

In 1980, the New York Times began international syndication of a new strip from Kirschen, called Adam An', starring Adam, Eve, and the snake in the Garden of Eden. It ran until 1982.

Around the same time, Kirschen began a second career as a software developer. In 1982, he partnered with Gesher Educational Affiliates to produce several Apple II games aimed at Jewish youth in Israel and the U.S. Afterward, he started his own software companies — LKP Ltd. in Israel and Just For You Inc. in the U.S. In 1985, he released two ELIZA-like graphical chatbots which were among the earliest entertainment offerings for the Atari ST computer. One of them, Murray and Me, was modeled closely on his "Shuldig" character from Dry Bones. From 1986 to 1989, he developed technology to generate music autonomously by remixing elements from existing pieces, ultimately releasing it as The Music Creator for the PC; but it failed commercially and left Kirschen in debt.

After a 2019 cartoon in the New York Times depicting Benjamin Netanyahu as a guide dog leading Donald Trump (portrayed as a blind man) sparked controversy over perceived antisemitism, Kirschen criticized the cartoon, which he believed was using both anti-semitic tropes and a lack of creativity.

Kirschen criticized the general field of political cartooning for condoning antisemitism. In an interview he gave the example of a cartoon by Dave Brown depicting Ariel Sharon as eating babies, which won several awards. Kirschen said his cartoons are designed to make people laugh, which makes them drop their guard and see things the way he does. In an interview, he defined his objective as a cartoonist as an attempt to "seduce rather than to offend." Kirschen was opposed to the Boycott, Divestment and Sanctions movement and criticized it in his cartoons. In 2015, he founded a virtual campus named the Dry Bones Academy of Cartoon Advocacy and Activism.

Yaakov Kirschen died in 2025 at the age of 87.

== Reception and criticism ==
During the aftermath of the Sabra and Shatila massacre in 1982, The New York Times published an article on Israeli perception of the event, where Dry Bones was featured.

"When terrorists attacked from Syria, we blamed the Syrians. When murderous infiltrators slipped in from Lebanon, we blamed the Lebanese. When P.L.O. killers launched raids from Jordan, we blamed the Jordanians. When fedayeen goons came in from Egypt, we blamed the Egyptians. But when we send a bloodthirsty gang into a refugee camp, we blame everyone in the world except ourselves. Whether it was omission or commission, we've got something to atone for this Yom Kippur." – Yaakov Kirschen

Dry Bones has been characterized as generally pro-Israel, and has tried to spread awareness of the persecution of Christians in Africa and Syria. In his obituary, Jewish News Syndicate describes Kirschen as "a proud Zionist." Thomas L. Friedman described it as the Israeli equivalent to the Doonesbury cartoon in 1985.

The comic strip was criticised in an episode of the podcast Chapo Trap House for what they judged was its "poor quality" and "overt racism", referring to it as "Zionist Ziggy" owing to the similar simplistic style of both comics. Following Kirschen's death, Chapo revisited the comic strip, noting its long-lasting advocacy for the release of convicted spy Jonathan Pollard as a cause célèbre.

== Awards ==
Kirschen won the Israeli Museum of Caricature and Comics' Golden Pencil Award for his work in 2012; he received the Nefesh B'Nefesh Bonei Zion Prize for culture and the arts in 2014.

== Books ==
- Trees, the Green Testament (1993)
- The Dry Bones Haggadah (2016)
- Young and Innocent: The Way We Were (2017)
