= Dick Polman =

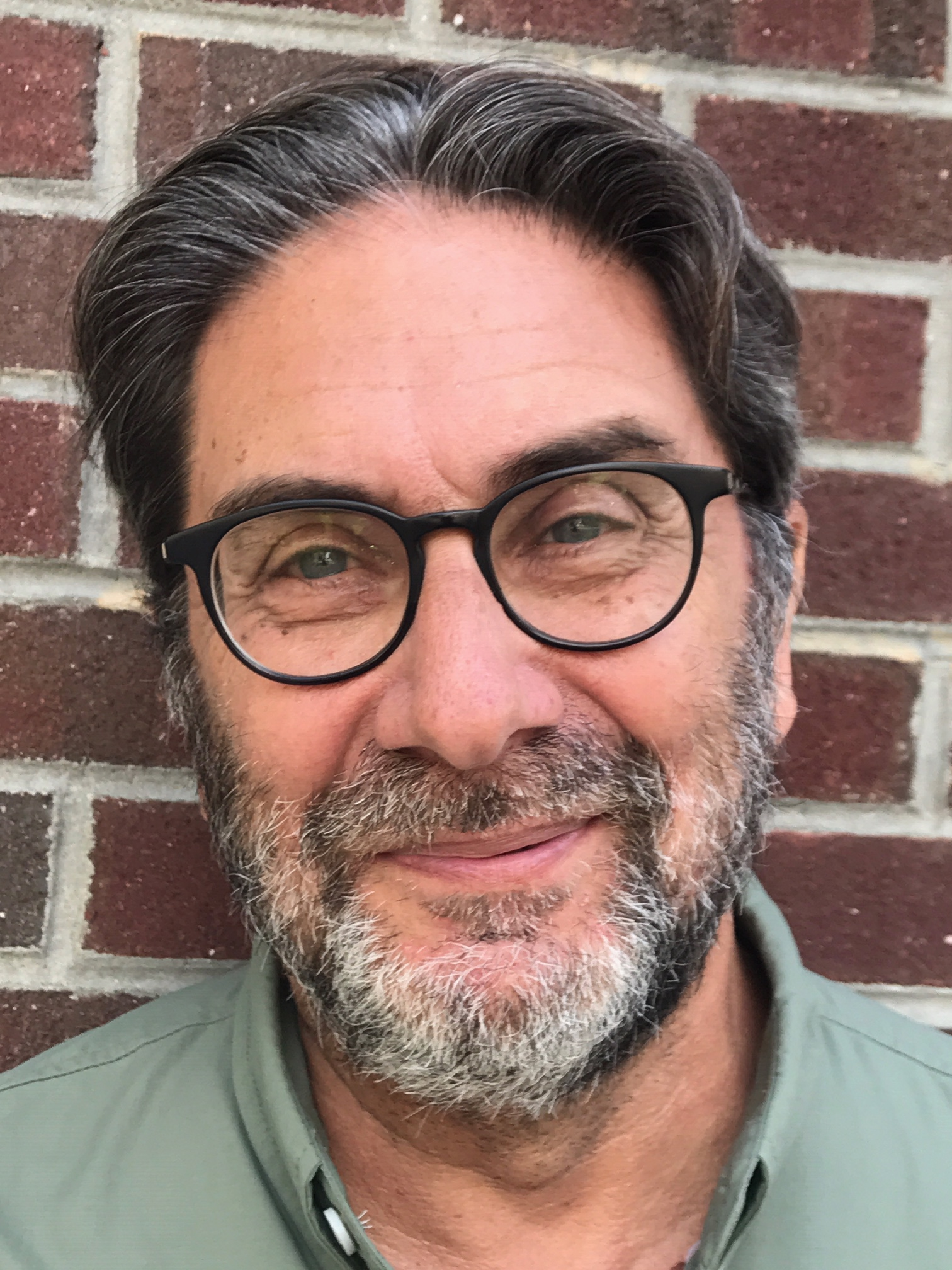
Polman in 2011

Dick Polman is a veteran national political columnist and the "Writer in Residence" at the Center for Programs in Contemporary Writing, University of Pennsylvania. He has taught there since 2003, specializing in long-form journalism and political commentary. He currently writes at dickpolman.substack.com. His political columns from 2019 to 2024 are archived at dickpolman.net. He previously was a columnist at The Philadelphia Inquirer and WHYY News, the public media outlet in Philadelphia.

Polman grew up in western Massachusetts and studied at George Washington University, where he obtained a bachelor's degree in Public Affairs, focusing on politics and policy, and served as managing editor of the college newspaper. He was a metro columnist at The Hartford Courant and, prior to that, he was the founding editor of The Hartford Advocate before joining The Inquirer in 1984. As an Inquirer writer, he covered the 1992, 1996, 2000, 2004, and 2008 United States presidential campaigns. His Inquirer column ran from 2004 to 2012. His WHYY column ran from 2012 to 2019. He has been described by the Columbia Journalism Review as one of the United States' top political reporters, and by ABC News as "one of the finest political journalists of his generation."
