= Saint-Just-le-Martel =

- Commune
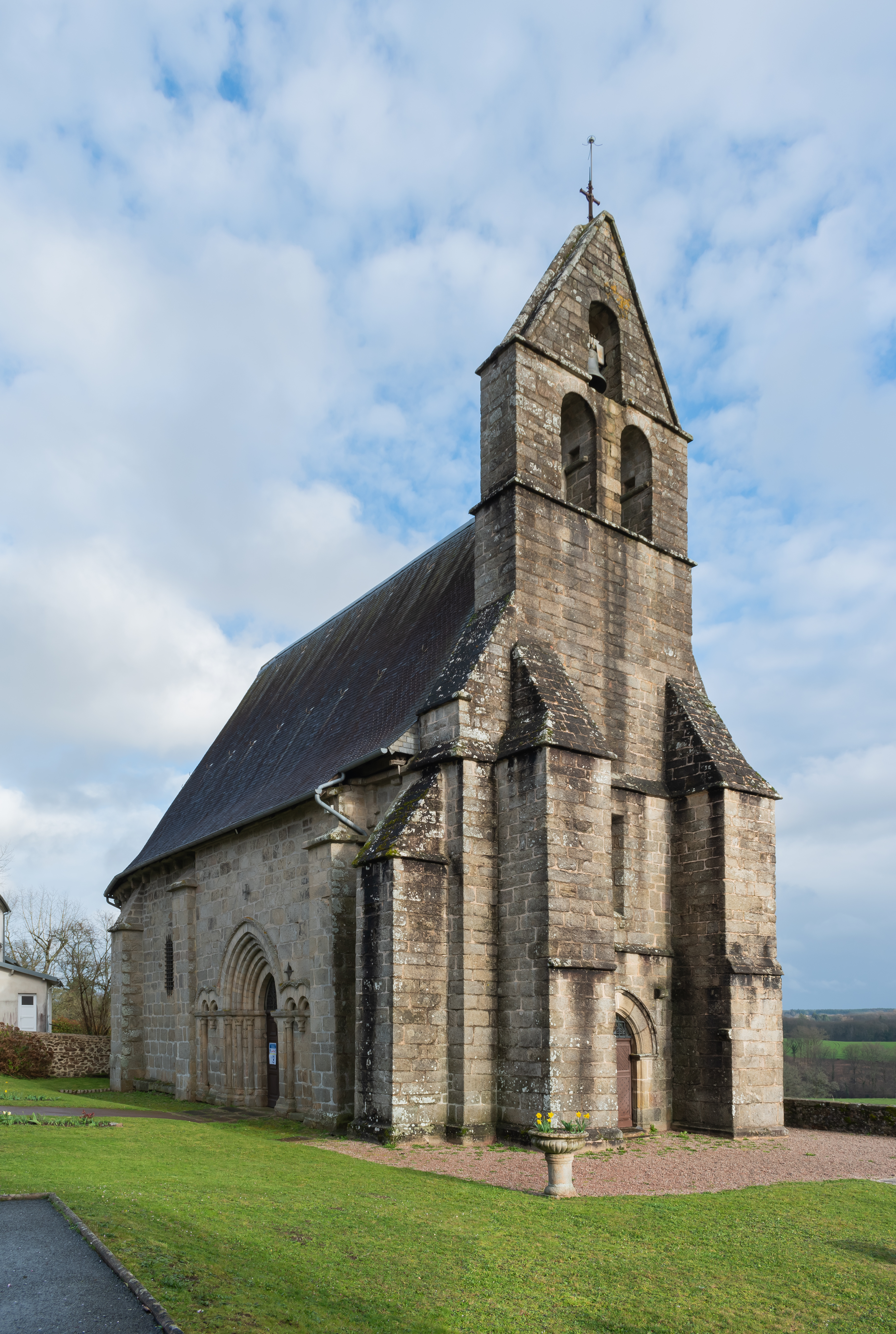
- The church of Saint-Just, in Saint-Just-le-Martel
- Location of Saint-Just-le-Martel
- Location within France Location within Nouvelle-Aquitaine
- Coordinates: 45°51′47″N 1°23′19″E
- Country: France
- Region: Nouvelle-Aquitaine
- Department: Haute-Vienne
- Arrondissement: Limoges
- Canton: Saint-Léonard-de-Noblat
- Intercommunality: CU Limoges Métropole

Government
  - Mayor (2020–2026): Joël Garestier
- Area^{1}: 31.70 km^{2} (12.24 sq mi)
- Highest elevation: 426 m (1,398 ft)
- Lowest elevation: 224 m (735 ft)
- Population (2023): 2,606
  - Density: 82.21/km^{2} (212.9/sq mi)
- Time zone: UTC+01:00 (CET)
  - Summer (DST): UTC+02:00 (CEST)
- INSEE/Postal code: 87156 /87590
- ^{1} French Land Register data, which excludes lakes, ponds, glaciers > 1 km^{2} (0.386 sq mi or 247 acres) and river estuaries.

Saint-Just-le-Martel (French pronunciation: [sɛ̃ ʒyst lə maʁtɛl]; Limousin: Sent Just (dau Martèu)) is a commune in the Haute-Vienne department in the Nouvelle-Aquitaine region in west-central France.

== Population ==
Historical population
Year	Pop.	±% p.a.
1968	1,044	—
1975	1,213	+2.17%
1982	1,530	+3.37%
1990	1,825	+2.23%
1999	1,959	+0.79%
2007	2,349	+2.30%
2012	2,596	+2.02%
2017	2,677	+0.62%
2023	2,606	−0.45%
Source: INSEE

== See also ==
- Communes of the Haute-Vienne department
