= Daryl Cagle =

American cartoonist

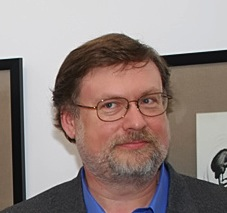
- Cagle in 2010
- Born: 21 June 1956 (age 70)
- Areas: Cartoonist, blogger, satirist
- Notable works: Cagle Cartoons

Daryl Cagle (born 1956) is an American editorial cartoonist, the publisher of Cagle.com and owner of Cagle Cartoons, Inc., a newspaper syndicate.

== Career ==
Cagle worked with The Muppets from 1979 through 1993. He drew a daily editorial cartoon panel titled, TRUE! for Tribune Media Services in 1995 and went on to draw local editorial cartoons for Hawaii's MidWeek newspaper. He moved to drawing daily cartoons for Gannett's Honolulu Advertiser newspaper, and became the cartoonist for Slate.com in 2000; in 2005 Cagle moved from Slate.com to become the cartoonist for msnbc.com.

Cagle is an occasional syndicated columnist and speaker; he is a past president of the National Cartoonists Society and the National Cartoonists Society Foundation.

In 2001, Cagle started Cagle Cartoons, a political cartoon and column syndicate which distributes the work of newspaper editorial cartoonists and columnists from around the world to approximately 850 subscribing newspapers. Cagle Cartoons is a "package service" where subscribing publications receive all of the content and can reprint whatever they choose.

== Mexican Flag cartoon ==
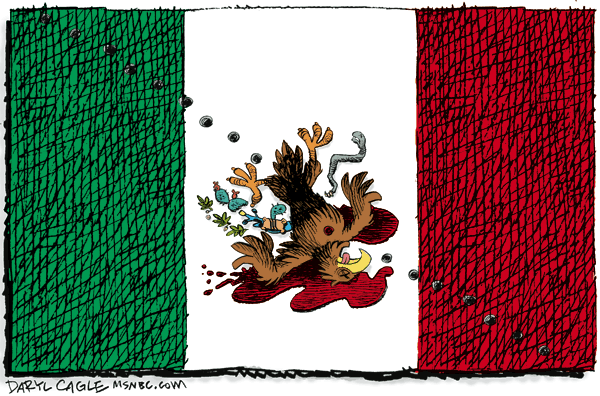
Daryl Cagle's controversial Mexican flag cartoon

In September 2010, Cagle published a cartoon showing the Mexican flag, whose coat of arms normally depicts an eagle perched on a prickly pear cactus devouring a snake, dead in a pool of blood, with the flag itself riddled with bullet holes. The cartoon drew criticism after running on the front pages of many Mexican newspapers. Many outraged Mexican readers pointed out that it is against the law in Mexico to alter the image of the flag – a law that did not deter Mexican newspapers from printing the cartoon. Ricardo Alday, a spokesman for the Mexican Embassy in Washington, said that "as any democratic society, Mexico respects and defends freedom of speech and freedom of expression, in any way it's manifested. Regarding the case of Mr. Cagle's cartoon, we differ on the use he makes of the Mexican flag and the message it conveys."

"It is the role of editorial cartoonists to criticize governments and nations, and to use the symbols of nations in our cartoons," Cagle wrote in response to the outrage. "Cartoonists all around the world use flags in their cartoons and no country can opt out of criticism because they view their own flag as "sacred". This attitude outrages my Mexican critics, especially since it comes from an ugly, foreign, American cartoonist."

== International travel ==
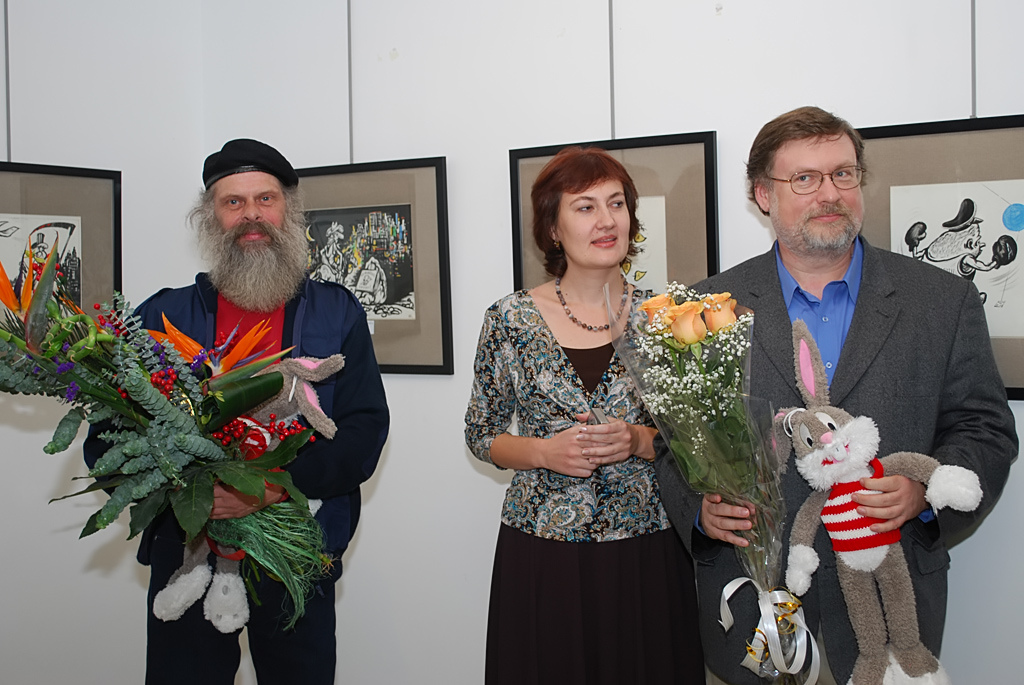
John Kudryavtsev and Daryl Cagle at the 2010 opening of "Reflections of Life: Cartoons for Adults..." at the Arka Gallery in Vladivostok, Russia

For the U.S. State Department Cagle traveled to Vladivostok in December 2010, where he participated in a joint exhibition with Russian political cartoonist John Kudryavtsev.

Cagle has made several international trips arranged by the U.S. State Department. In New Delhi in September 2012 he spoke about changing trends in news cartooning. Commenting about how much American cartoonists are paid, he said "Editors are cheap. They subscribe to syndication for $15 a week."

In 2013, Cagle won the “Prix de l’humour Vache” award at the Salon de St. Just annual cartooning festival held in Saint-Just-le-Martel, France.

In June 2015, Cagle traveled to Kyiv, Ukraine to attend the opening of an International Exhibition of Political Cartoons, where he delivered three lectures on cartoon art and gave a professional workshop.

In March 2021, Cagle’s work was exhibited at the Indian Cartoon Gallery in Bengaluru, India, which is hosted by the Indian Institute of Cartoonists.

In October 2023, Cagle won the Prix Gérard Vandenbroucke at the Salon international du dessin de presse et d'humour de Saint-Just-le-Martel, Europe’s largest festival of editorial cartoons, which takes place annually in Saint-Just-le-Martel. The prize is awarded in recognition of the defense of cartoonists’ rights around the world.

== Personal life ==
Cagle is married to his wife, Peg, and has two children, Susie and Michael (called "Mac") Cagle.
