= Adam Zyglis =

American cartoonist (born 1982)

Adam O. Zyglis (born July 9, 1982) is a Pulitzer Prize-winning American editorial cartoonist who works for the Buffalo News of Buffalo, New York, where he replaced fellow Pulitzer Prize–winner Tom Toles, when Toles became the cartoonist for The Washington Post. Zyglis is also nationally syndicated through Cagle Cartoons, Inc. He has also done freelance work and caricatures and cartoons for the weekly alternative Artvoice. Zyglis has won awards from the Associated College Press, and the Universal Press Syndicate, and has been nominated for several other national cartooning awards. He placed third in the 2007 and 2011 National Headliner Awards. In 2013, he won the Clifford K. and James T. Berryman Award, given by the National Press Foundation. Zyglis was awarded the 2015 Pulitzer Prize for Editorial Cartooning for using, in the committee's citation, "strong images to connect with readers while conveying layers of meaning in few words. "

His cartoon about the July 2025 Central Texas floods prompted numerous death threats directed at Zyglis and his family, resulting in the cancellation of an event promoting local journalism at the Buffalo History Museum due to safety concerns.

Zyglis graduated from Canisius College in 2004 with a Bachelor of Science in Computer Science and Math. He was Art Director and cartoonist for The Griffin, Canisius's student newspaper. His work for The Griffin won him three national collegiate cartooning awards.
