= Mark Fiore (cartoonist) =

American political cartoonist

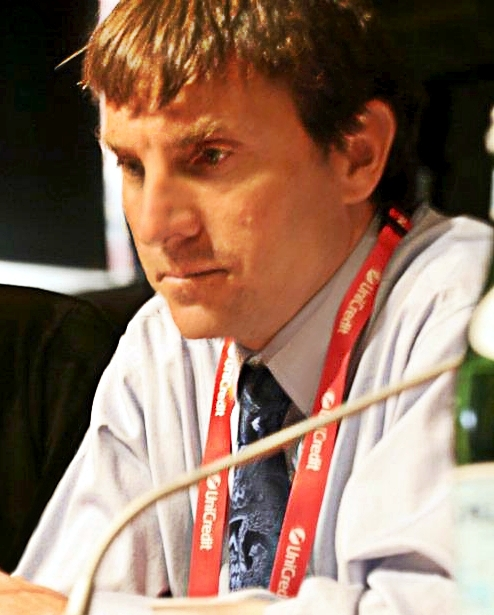
- Mark Fiore at the 2011 International Journalism Festival
- Born: 1970 (age 55–56) California, United States
- Area: Editorial

Mark Fiore is an American political cartoonist specializing in Flash-animated editorial cartoons. He won a Pulitzer Prize in 2010, the first ever for cartoon that did not appear in print.

== Career ==
The Wall Street Journal called Fiore "the undisputed guru" of his editorial cartoon niche.

Fiore lives in San Francisco, California, and his cartoons have appeared in numerous American papers and a number of web sites. He studied political science at Colorado College and was a staff cartoonist for the San Jose Mercury News. He left newspapers for animated online comics in 2001, and he currently makes animated editorial cartoons for his web site markfiore.com, from which he also sells DVDs of his cartoons. He is a member of the Association of American Editorial Cartoonists.

Fiore's comics were included in Ted Rall's Attitude 3: The New Subversive Online Cartoonists, along with other web-comics such as Dinosaur Comics, Diesel Sweeties, Fetus-X, and The Perry Bible Fellowship. In their review of Attitude 3, the American Library Association's Booklist called Fiore's cartoons a standout for their "unique and personal" vision.

== Recurring characters ==
In some of his Flash cartoons, Fiore makes use of several characters more than once. Some of those characters include:

- Suzie Newsykins
- Dogboy & Mr. Dan—an anthropomorphic dog chats who with his friend Mr. Dan, who is rabidly conservative
- Buster Bunker The Friendly Nuke—a nuke
- Knuckles—a slow man in an executioner's mask who loves torturing Guantanamo prisoners
- Flamey McGassy
- Ouchie—a talking bandaid
- Captain Killmore
- Snuggly the Security Bear—a rather sadistic teddy bear who puts a positive spin on domestic spying and wiretaps
- Right-wing Ralphie—a squat lawyer with pixie wings who fights for homosexuals to gain restitution for being "forced" into marriage; after the passage of California's Proposition 8, Ralphie celebrates the "protection of heterosexual marriage"; he is a caricature of Ralph Reed, the former Religious Right leader
- Buzzie the Fly—a Cajun fly who updates the nation on the New Orleans reconstruction, especially the living conditions of Hurricane Katrina refugees

== Awards ==
Fiore was awarded an Online Journalism Award by the Online News Association and the Columbia University Graduate School of Journalism. He was nominated for the National Cartoonist Society New Media Award in 2000 and he won it for 2001 and 2002. He also won the 2005 Robert F. Kennedy Journalism Award in the category of cartoons.

=== Pulitzer Prize ===
Fiore won the 2010 Pulitzer Prize for Editorial Cartooning. He is the first cartoonist to win an editorial cartooning Pulitzer for an entry of entirely online animations, and his winning work appears on SFGate.com, the San Francisco Chronicle web site. The Pulitzer Prize committee, in a statement, said that "his biting wit, extensive research and ability to distill complex issues [on the web site] set a high standard for an emerging form of commentary."
