= Attitude: The New Subversive Cartoonists =

Series of anthologies of alternative comics

Attitude: The New Subversive Cartoonists is a series of anthologies of alternative comics, photos and artists' interviews edited by Universal Press Syndicate editorial cartoonist Ted Rall. The books were designed by J. P. Trostle, news editor of EditorialCartoonists.com. Two sequels and three spin-off titles have been published to date. A group of cartoonists featured in the Attitude series formed the organization Cartoonists With Attitude in June 2006; the group has hosted slideshow and panel events around the United States to promote the series and alternative political cartooning. The New Labor Forum described the series as "filled with politically attuned graphic artistry."

== Attitude: The New Subversive Political Cartoonists ==
Attitude: The New Subversive Political Cartoonists
- Author: Ted Rall (editor)
- Series: Attitude
- Subject: Political Cartoons
- Genre: anthology
- Publisher: Nantier Beall Minoustchine Publishing
- Publication date: June 2002
- Media type: paperback
- Pages: 128
- ISBN: 1-56163-317-8
- OCLC: 50760357
- Dewey Decimal: 741.5/973 22
- LC Class: NC1305 .A87 2002
- Followed by: Attitude 2: The New Subversive Alternative Cartoonists

Attitude: The New Subversive Political Cartoonists focuses on cartoonists whose work appeared in alternative weekly newspapers, with a view toward defining a new genre of political comics that, in Rall's words, are "too alternative for the mainstream and too mainstream for the underground."

The Minneapolis Star Tribune wrote: "Some of the cartoons are type-dominated (Don Asmussen's); many are not artistically pleasing; several would not pass the standards for a family newspaper." The Baltimore Sun wrote "There is moral rage, drama and righteousness that are both breezy and mortally serious." "This is provocative, if often still rough and immature, stuff. And if history is still a guide, many of these artists will emerge as the best of the next generation of mainstream newspaper cartoonists." The American Library Association's Booklist wrote that "Whereas old-school editorial cartoonists rely on timeworn traditions, topics, and techniques, the new breed tackles contemporary concerns, such as commercialism and environmentalism ... Their drawings are usually subservient to their scripts, and both take a back seat to their attitude ... The best of them possess so much lacerating wit and unswerving commitment that they fairly shame their hidebound mainstream counterparts into retirement."

Attitude: The New Subversive Political Cartoonists made The Progressive's list of "Favorite books of 2002."

The artists included and their comics are:

- Lloyd Dangle: Troubletown
- Andy Singer: No Exit
- Don Asmussen: The San Francisco Comic Strip
- Tom Tomorrow: This Modern World
- Clay Butler: Sidewalk Bubblegum
- Peter Kuper: Eye of the Beholder
- Jen Sorensen: Slowpoke
- Scott Bateman
- Tim Eagan: Deep Cover, Subconscious Comics
- Derf Backderf: The City
- Lalo Alcaraz: La Cucaracha
- Joe Sharpnack
- Eric Bezdek: Corn Valley
- Ruben Bolling: Tom the Dancing Bug
- William L. Brown: Citizen Bill
- Ward Sutton: Schlock 'n' Roll
- Stephanie McMillan: Minimum Security
- Mickey Siporin: America Outta Line
- Jim Siergey: Cultural Jet Lag
- Ted Rall: Search and Destroy
- Matt Wuerker: Lint Trap

== Attitude 2: The New Subversive Alternative Cartoonists ==
Attitude 2: The New Subversive Alternative Cartoonists
- Attitude 2: The New Subversive Alternative Cartoonists
- Author: Ted Rall (editor)
- Series: Attitude
- Subject: Alternative comics
- Genre: anthology
- Publisher: Nantier Beall Minoustchine Publishing
- Publication date: February 2004
- Media type: paperback
- Pages: 128
- ISBN: 1-56163-381-X
- Preceded by: Attitude: The New Subversive Political Cartoonists
- Followed by: Attitude 3: The New Subversive Online Cartoonists

Attitude 2: The New Subversive Alternative Cartoonists followed Attitude: The New Subversive Political Cartoonists by two years. For the second book in the series, Rall turned to alternative weekly-oriented cartoonists whose work leaned more toward general humor than the original volume. It did also includes several political cartoonists.

The San Diego Union-Tribune described Attitude 2 as "the ribald, self-righteous comix in the best alternative weeklies ... 'Question Authority' is their collective motto, and as long as they're making people mad as hell, they must be doing something right." The United Kingdom's The Observer wrote that "This is satire in an angry-youth-with-piercings mode. The spiritual forebears are the cartoonists of the 1960s-70s underground (Robert Crumb et al.) but the use of clip art and scratchy line techniques mark this out as a very contemporary collection, and happily the humour is of high quality." Publishers Weekly wrote that "These cartoonists are, generally, writers who use the medium to get across verbal puns or simple, angry screeds, regardless of visual style or any other comics-based concerns. ... This worthy compilation of cartoonists who otherwise wouldn't be seen outside of their local weeklies showcases the continuing vitality of comics as social criticism."

The artists included and their comics are:

- Keith Knight: The K Chronicles
- Neil Swaab: Rehabilitating Mr. Wiggles
- Emily S. Flake: Lulu Eightball
- Tak Toyoshima: Secret Asian Man
- Brian Sendelbach: Smell of Steve, Inc.
- Jennifer Berman: Berman
- Alison Bechdel: Dykes to Watch Out For
- Shannon Wheeler: Too Much Coffee Man
- Mikhaela B. Reid: The Boiling Point
- Aaron McGruder: The Boondocks
- Tim Kreider: The Pain – When Will It End?
- Barry Deutsch: Ampersand
- David Rees: Get Your War On
- Max Cannon: Red Meat
- Eric Orner: The Mostly Unfabulous Social Life of Ethan Green
- Greg Peters: Suspect Device
- Jason Youngbluth: Deep Fried
- Steven Notley: Bob the Angry Flower
- Justin Jones: Soda-Pong
- Kevin Moore: In Contempt Comics
- Marian Henley: Maxine!

== Attitude 3: The New Subversive Online Cartoonists ==
Attitude 3: The New Subversive Online Cartoonists
- Attitude: The New Subversive Online Cartoonists
- Author: Ted Rall (editor)
- Series: Attitude
- Subject: Webcomics
- Genre: anthology
- Publisher: Nantier Beall Minoustchine Publishing
- Publication date: June 2006
- Media type: paperback
- Pages: 128
- ISBN: 1-56163-465-4
- Preceded by: Attitude 2: The New Subversive Alternative Cartoonists

Attitude 3: The New Subversive Online Cartoonists is the third volume in the Attitude series. Whereas volumes one and two of the series concentrated on print cartoonists, Attitude 3 focuses exclusively upon webcomics.

The artists included and their comics are:

- Rob Balder: PartiallyClips
- Dale Beran and David Hellman: A Lesson Is Learned But The Damage Is Irreversible
- Matt Bors: Idiot Box
- Steven L. Cloud: Boy on a Stick and Slither
- M.e. Cohen: HumorInk
- Chris Dlugosz: Pixel
- Thomas K. Dye: Newshounds
- Mark Fiore: Fiore Animated Cartoons
- Dorothy Gambrell: Cat and Girl
- Nicholas Gurewitch: The Perry Bible Fellowship
- Brian McFadden: Big Fat Whale
- Eric Millikin: Fetus-X
- Ryan North: Dinosaur Comics
- August J. Pollak: XQUZYPHYR & Overboard
- Mark Poutenis: Thinking Ape Blues
- Jason Pultz: Comic Strip
- Adam Rust: Adam's Rust
- D. C. Simpson: I Drew This & Ozy and Millie
- Ben Smith: Fighting Words
- Richard Stevens: Diesel Sweeties
- Michael Zole: Death to the Extremist
