= Mikhaela Reid =

American cartoonist

- Born: Mikhaela Blake Reid; June 1, 1980 (age 46) Lowell, Massachusetts
- Area: Cartoonist
- Notable works: Attack of the 50-Foot Mikhaela!

Mikhaela Blake Reid (born June 1, 1980, in Lowell, Massachusetts) is an editorial cartoonist whose work has appeared in various alternative newspapers and magazines, including The Boston Phoenix, Bay Windows, Metro Times, and In These Times, and was also reprinted in Los Angeles Times. Reid frequently draws cartoons supporting LGBT rights.

Reid worked as an information graphics designer at the Wall Street Journal, where one of the articles she worked on won a Pulitzer Prize. Currently, she's employed at United Media.

Reid was profiled in the 2004 book Attitude 2: The New Subversive Alternative Cartoonists, edited by award-winning syndicated editorial cartoonist Ted Rall. Rall would later write the foreword to Attack of the 50-Foot Mikhaela!, a collection of Reid's editorial cartoons.

Reid describes herself as growing up as "a very angry punk rock bisexual teen." She currently resides in Brooklyn with her husband, Masheka Wood, and their two children.

== Bibliography ==
- Attack of the 50-Foot Mikhaela! (Calamity Press, 2007) ISBN 978-0979581908
