= Brian McFadden (cartoonist) =

American cartoonist (born 1979)

- Born: 1979 (age 46–47) Quincy, MA
- Area: Cartoonist
- Notable works: Big Fat Whale

Brian McFadden is an American cartoonist who started on GeoCities in 2001, created Big Fat Whale, and became a featured artist at The New York Times in 2011.

== Personal life ==
As of June 2011, McFadden was 27 years old and lived in Massachusetts. At a young age, McFeddan was influenced by Matt Groening's alternative comic Life in Hell.

== Big Fat Whale ==
Big Fat Whale was a weekly webcomic both written and illustrated by McFadden. The comic started on October 16, 2001, in a form which the cartoonist described as "terrible, even by webcomic standards." Eventually, the strip improved.

The strip began its print run in Boston's monthly publication Editorial Humor in 2002. However, the publication went out of business and the strip stayed on the web for almost a year. In February 2004, Big Fat Whale was picked up by Cleveland Free Times and later by The Boston Phoenix. Big Fat Whale was included in Ted Rall's Attitude 3: The New Subversive Online Cartoonists.

== At The New York Times ==
McFadden described being chosen as being a featured artist in The New York Times as being "plucked from some sandlot and dropped into a Major League stadium." The online newspaper was reinventing its "Sunday Review" section in May 2011, and Aviva Michaelov asked McFadden personally to join the section’s opening-debut roster. McFadden produced a weekly strip through 2016. McFeddan needed to get his scripts approved by mid-week so that he had enough time for his editing process.

McFadden was supposed to have given the section a "younger perspective".
