= Gargoyle Humor Magazine =

Humor magazine

The Gargoyle Humor Magazine
- Editor-in-Chief: Sabrina Barnes
- First issue: 1909
- Company: University of Michigan
- Country: United States
- Based in: Ann Arbor, Michigan
- Website: GargMag.com
- OCLC: 3270519

The Gargoyle Humor Magazine or The Gargoyle is the official student-run humor magazine for the University of Michigan. It has been satirizing both local and national events for more than one hundred years. The magazine is part of the university's Student Publications, which also includes the campus newspaper, The Michigan Daily, as well as the yearbook, the Michiganensian.

To current and former editors and staff, the magazine is often known simply as The Garg.

== Location ==
The Gargoyle's office is located on the second floor of the Student Publications Building at 420 Maynard Street in Ann Arbor, Michigan. The office serves as the staff's production area; it is also home to a number of relics, including two bombshells obtained from the local army surplus and a poster from popular film Whore 2.

== History ==
Gargoyle Magazine cover by Kris Jacque, December 2003

The Gargoyle was founded in 1909. Its first editor in chief, Lee A. White, eventually became editor of the Detroit News and helped found La Choy Foods. Gargoyle was initially a literary magazine featuring stories, articles and pictures with a back section devoted to comedy.

In the 1920s and 1930s, a period during which it was selected as America's Outstanding College Comic Magazine, Gargoyle was published monthly during the school year. The decrease in male students brought about by World War II resulted in the first woman, Olga Gruhzit, becoming editor of Gargoyle in 1942. In 1944, at the height of the war, Gargoyle briefly ceased publication, only to return in the fall of 1945.

Gargoyle was declared dead in 1950 when the Board in Control of Student Publications took offense to the issue "The Smooth Gargoyle". Publication continued off campus for a year, and when Gargoyle returned the next year, literary pieces were discontinued and the focus became solely humor. During the 1950s the magazine acquired a counterculture reputation, promoting everything from co-ed housing in the 1950s to Vietnam War protests in the 1960s. In response to the advent of Playboy in the 1950s and the sexual revolution of the 1960s, Gargoyle became progressively more risque. While sex, illegal drugs, and otherwise raunchy jokes have been common fare in issues of the Gargoyle since the 1970s, the magazine has generally tried to maintain a level of intelligence and artistry in its humor.

Art editor Phil Zaret's satirical cartoon, "Kill a Commie for Christ", originally published in the Gargoyle in 1967, became extremely popular during the Vietnam War and was re-published by college publications throughout the United States.

Though the Gargoyle was very successful in the '60's, it struggled to publish in the early 1970s, returned for a few issues in 1974–75, and returned to consistent publication in 1979. The magazine has been forced off-campus (in 1950) and shut down completely (1960–61, 1997) as the result of editorial and financial conflicts with the Board for Student Publications (previously the Board in Control of Student Publications). At one time the magazine was sold for prices varying from fifty cents to two dollars, but for the last five years, it has been free, all revenue being generated by advertisements.

In 1962, cartoonist Charles M. Schulz responded to a request for a Peanuts cartoon by drawing Snoopy with his nose perched over the end of his dog house in the manner of a gargoyle—this became a standard Snoopy pose.

In March 2020, the Gargoyle entered exclusively digital circulation as the COVID-19 pandemic raged. Editor-in-Chief Maddie Eberstein and Business Manager Nick Dabagia orchestrated the magazine's return to print in Fall 2021 with the Unwelcome Back issue. Dabagia became Editor-in-Chief following Eberstein's graduation in April 2022. Under his direction, the Gargoyle staff grew to pre-pandemic levels, and the print magazine underwent an expansion from 16 to 24 pages. Art Director Ruth Marks has also facilitated an artistic revival in the magazine, in no small part due to the recruitment and loyalty of numerous artists and illustrators from the Penny W. Stamps School of Art and Design.

== Mascots ==
Over the decades it has been a Gargoyle tradition for the mascot to periodically change at the whims of the current editor and artists on staff.

== Notable alumni ==
In the 1999 book, Gargoyle Laughs at the 20th Century, editor John Dobbertin compiled all Gargoyle staff members credited in the masthead to date. This list includes several University of Michigan alumni before they became famous, including the following:

- Lee Blaser, cartoonist.
- Lloyd Dangle, cartoonist (Troubletown).
- Jerry Ellison, cartoonist.
- Larry Brilliant, philanthropist
- Max Hodge, television writer/director/producer
- Lawrence Kasdan, screenwriter/director.
- Terry LaBan, cartoonist (Edge City).
- George Lichty (under the name Maurice Lichtenstein), cartoonist (Grin and Bear It).
- Janet Malcolm, essayist, journalist, and critic.
- Allen Milgrom, cartoonist/editor (Marvel Comics).
- Arthur Miller, playwright.
- David Newman, screenwriter.
- Robert Shaye, producer (New Line Cinemas).

== See also ==
- Bentley Historical Library
