= Diesel Sweeties =

Serial webcomic by Richard Stevens III

- Diesel Sweeties number 1
- Author: Richard Stevens III
- Website: dieselsweeties.com
- Current status/schedule: Ended
- Launch date: April 2000; 26 years ago
- Syndicate: United Features Syndicate (January 2007 – August 2008)
- Genre: Humor

Diesel Sweeties is a webcomic and former newspaper comic strip written by Richard Stevens III (R Stevens). The comic began in 2000, originally hosted at robotstories.com. From January 2007 until August 2008 it was syndicated to over 20 United States newspapers, including major daily newspapers like The Detroit News and Houston Chronicle.

Material from Diesel Sweeties appears in Ted Rall's Attitude 3: The New Subversive Online Cartoonists, along with other webcomics such as Cat and Girl, Dinosaur Comics, Boy on a Stick and Slither, Fetus-X, and The Perry Bible Fellowship.

Stevens is a co-founder of the Dumbrella alliance of webcomic artists. Stephens is one of the few professional webcomic artists, who has since 2002 supported himself through online sales of merchandise related to his comics.

== Newspaper syndication ==
In late 2006, Richard Stevens announced that Diesel Sweeties would be syndicated to newspapers through United Features Syndicate. Some newspapers began running the strip on 1 January 2007, to replace FoxTrot by Bill Amend, which had ended its daily run, . The regular distribution began a week later, on 8 January. On 26 June 2008, Stevens announced that the print run of Diesel Sweeties would end on 10 August of that year. Stephens had doubled his comics workload by creating separate strips for the newspaper and web versions of Diesel Sweeties, and had produced about 600 strips specifically for the newspapers. Stevens cited exhaustion from doing a dozen strips per week, as well as the fact that the majority of his income remained tied to the website. Stevens estimated that "about 50 papers ran DS at one point or another."

== Format ==
For the first several years, the comic consisted of four square panels of dialogue in a two-by-two grid, with a punchline (often a non sequitur, pun, or pop culture reference) in the final panel. In 2005 Stevens abandoned this traditional form and began consistently publishing strips with more panels in slightly more varied configurations. Single panels of the strip are occasionally animated. The comic depicts a world where robots exist alongside humans, with human-robot romantic and sexual relationships commonplace. Although there is some character development and the occasional story arc, most strips are largely self-contained. Recurring themes include annual Halloween strips, featuring characters from the comic in costume.

== Characters ==
Diesel Sweeties incorporates many characters from other fictional works, from the real world, and introduces many original characters.

=== Main characters (online version) ===
The main characters in Diesel Sweeties are:

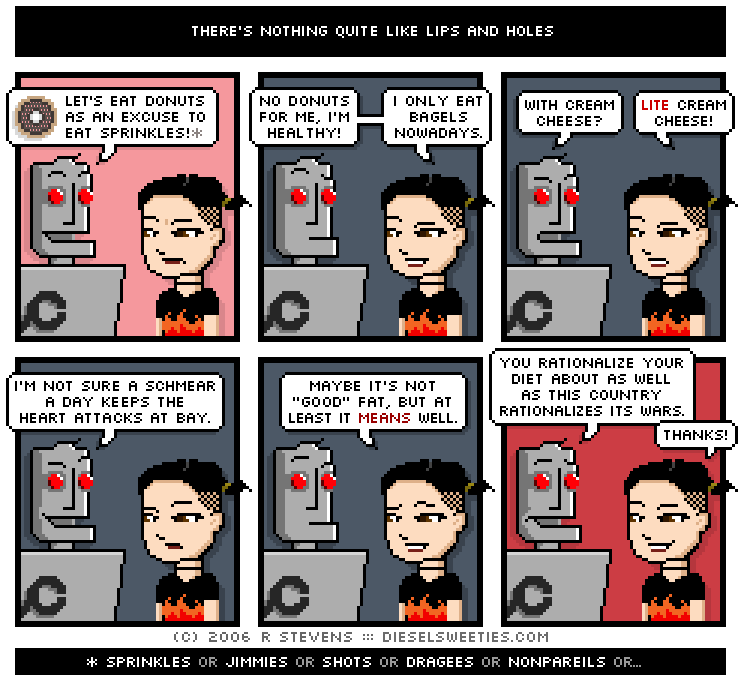
Clango and Pale Suzie discuss donuts.

- Clango Cyclotron, an emotional robot. Clango was introduced as the boyfriend of Maura Glee, the relationship later ended, and he moved on to dating Pale Suzie. Pale Suzie later shot him with an orbital laser when she suspected he was cheating on her with Maura. He deliberately erased his memory so that he "can be even more innocent than (he) is now!" Unfortunately Indie Rock Pete intentionally broke the backup CD, and Clango had to be restarted with an old boot disk from his days with Maura. He thinks he is still dating Maura. He was adopted by human parents, and has several famous human aunts and uncles, including Steve Wozniak, Beck, Courtney Love, and Stan Lee. Introduced in strip #1.
- Maura Demeter Glee (full name revealed in strip 1698), an alcoholic ex-pornstar. Maura was introduced as Clango's girlfriend, and she later got dumped for cheating on him. After Clango had his memory erased without a recent backup, Maura provided an old one and thus they are now back together. Introduced in strip #1. After an around the world bender, Maura was allegedly shipped back to Clango as a brain in a jar, a situation resolved as of Friday 5 December 2008. (The jar turned out to contain Billy Brainjar, a minor character.)
- Indie Rock Pete (later found to be named "Peter Gaylord Weiner", much to his disdain in strip #1241), a poseur obsessed with the idea of maintaining a façade of indie cred. Attempts to manipulate the other characters, but usually fails. Pete works as a substitute high school teacher, and developed a crush on Frieda Berger, one of his students, before finding out she was in high school. Introduced in strip #2. Apparently killed by gunshot to the head in strip #2307, but the strip's title ("not cannon"), may be a hint that it is not real, as is his appearances in strips after the incident #2309 anon.
- Lil' Sis, Maura's younger sister. Worked at a comic store for a time. Her name is generally not mentioned, but was once revealed as "Persephone Marie" in strip #1241. Was once featured in Questionable Content strip #171) as the girlfriend of a minor character. Introduced in strip #5.
- Electron Mike, an extreme technophile who listens to techno and collects iPods. Has a hate/hate relationship with Red Robot, and would rather recompile his Linux kernel than introduce effort into anything non-electronic. Introduced in strip #558.
- Metal Steve (found to have the last name "Wozniak" in strip #1819), a mullet-sporting rocker. The virginal yin to Pete's lecherous yang. He has had ongoing flirtations with both Lil Sis and Pale Suzie, but neither has successfully bedded him. Implied to be unusually well-endowed (strip #767); he was briefly recruited by Maura as a porn star for masturbation movies, but was run out of the business for refusing to work with a partner. Married Allie V. (Allison Vegetoksis) a dreadlocked vegetarian from L.A. that he "corrupted" with bacon, after his refusal for "dirty desertie" (he was saving himself for marriage), she proposed and they married (strip #2108). Introduced in strip #76.
- Pale Suzie, a cheerful goth chick and occasional furry who went on a date with Clango, while he and Maura were "on a break". She dated Clango for several months, but after she accused Clango of cheating on her with Maura (after they had been playing Wii together), he had his memory erased so that he "can be even more innocent than (he) is now!". Indie Rock Pete broke the backup CD and Clango is unaware he dated Pale Suzie. She is in a relationship with Charles. Introduced in strip #436.
- Red Robot #C-63, a robot dedicated to the crushing of human (written as "hu-mans"), although he has also been known to date them on occasion. He is wealthy after making a deal with Maura. Introduced in strip #24.
- OtaKate, a blue-haired otaku girl introduced in strip 1711 as a result of Pale Suzie's online dating mishap (Suzie thought Kate was a man pretending to be a woman). Probably bisexual. Through her profile on "DeathwishDamsels.com" (a play on SuicideGirls, she meets Indie Rock Pete. Later she becomes involved with Electron Mike, but dumps Mike hoping to bed Pale Suzie. After Suzie rejects her, she decides on "stuffy older men" and starts dating "Uncle Larry", a philatelist-porn producer.
- Freyja Tryggvason, a tall, dark-haired girl ("The Strongest Woman on Earth") introduced in strip 1973 answering Indie Rock Pete's ad for a drummer in his band. Her background is explained in strip 1976 where we are told she is "The daughter of a Norwegian Diplomat and an all-star women's basketball coach, raised on genetically modified corn in Nebraska, she has always been the tallest girl around". She is Red Robot #C-63's current girlfriend.
- Allie Vegetoksis, a vegan, non-violent, dreadlocked, trustafarian hippie. She is Metal Steve's wife.

=== Cameos from other comics and fiction ===
- DIV from Penny Arcade in strip #42.
- Red Robot from Explodingdog in many strips, starting with strip #24.
- Roger from When I Grow Up in strip #79.
- Shelley Winters and Fallon Young from Scary Go Round in strip #245.
- Shockwave from Transformers in strip #223.
- Tycho from Penny Arcade in strip #85 and #131.
- Weedmaster P from Overcompensating in strip #1338.

=== Main characters (newspaper version) ===
Comics.com described the strip as "reformatted" for family newspapers.

- Clango Cyclotron is a robot, a nice guy, and as red-blooded a male as a robot can be. He has been dating Maura Glee for some time and trying his best to understand humans.
- Maura Glee is a retired dot-com investor (or porn star) who cashed out before the market went south in, presumably, 2000. She is bored, but loves Clango, to the exclusion of others, especially human males. Her hobbies include drinking and more drinking.
- Indie Rock Pete composes music that nobody will hear. He manages a video store that refuses to rent movies that have been released on DVD. He discusses matters of the world with Clango.
- Lil' Sis is Maura's younger sister. She has recently moved in with Indie Rock Pete, but alas, it is platonic. She longs for Pete, but he's not buying.
- Metal Steve is a real musician, a true rocker. Lil' Sis is interested in him as well.
- Red Robot #C-63 has a mission, which is to kill every human on the planet. This, however, does not prevent him from exchanging bits of philosophy with the others in the pixelated crew, human and otherwise.
- Mr. Bear appears infrequently.

Other new characters for the newspaper version included TV, Coffee Maker, and Kitten. Together, they rule the household.
