= The Pain – When Will It End? =

Cartoon series drawn by Tim Kreider

- Author(s): Tim Kreider
- Website: www.thepaincomics.com/new_index.htm
- Current status/schedule: Weekly
- Launch date: September 20, 2000 (online)
- Genre(s): Political, social commentary

The Pain – When Will It End? is a cartoon drawn by Tim Kreider (born February 25, 1967) from 1994 until June 8, 2009 (with sporadic updates through early 2013). It was self-published until it began running weekly in the Baltimore City Paper in 1997. It was later picked up by the Jackson Planet Weekly and The Indy in Bloomington-Normal, Illinois. Since September 2000, it is also a webcomic.

Many of Kreider's comics during the 2000s addressed issues in American politics from a point of view harshly critical of the Presidency of George W. Bush. He is among the artists featured in Attitude 2: The New Subversive Alternative Cartoonists, edited by Ted Rall (2004). In 2006, The New York Times printed his defense of Pluto as a planet before and after its demotion to dwarf planet.

Anthology books include The Pain – When Will It End? (May 2004), Why Do They Kill Me? (May 2005) and Twilight of the Assholes: Cartoons & Essays 2005–2009 (February 2011). A limited edition collection, Fuck Them All, was published in September 2004 and a collection of essays and cartoons, We Learn Nothing, in 2012.
