= Korean War Museum =

Korean War Museum may refer to:

- Memorial of the War to Resist US Aggression and Aid Korea, China
- Victorious War Museum, North Korea
- War Memorial of Korea, South Korea
- Korean War National Museum (defunct), United States

== See also ==
- Korean War Veterans Memorial, United States
- North Korea Peace Museum
- Sinchon Museum of American War Atrocities, North Korea
