= Michiganensian =

University of Michigan official yearbook

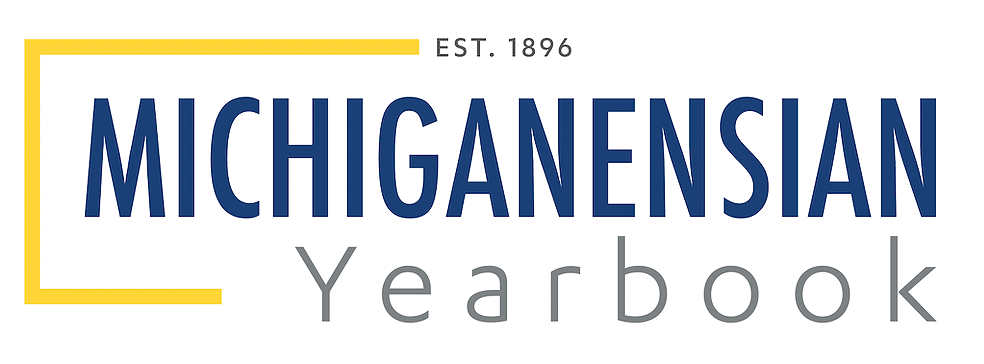

- 2020-2021 Michiganensian Cover
- Type: Annual publication
- Format: Yearbook
- School: University of Michigan
- Editor-in-chief: Dyanna Bateman
- Managing editor: Mishal Charania
- Founded: April 1896
- Headquarters: Stanford Lipsey Student Publications Building
- City: Ann Arbor, Michigan, US
- Website: Michiganensian.com

The Michiganensian, also known as the Ensian, is the official yearbook of the University of Michigan. Its first issue was published in April 1896, as a consolidation of three campus publications, The Res Gestae, the Palladium, and the Castalian. The yearbook is editorially and financially independent of the University of Michigan's administration and other student groups, but it shares the Stanford Lipsey Student Publications Building on 420 Maynard Street with The Michigan Daily and Gargoyle Humor Magazine.

The Michiganensian is published yearly in late spring by a staff of several dozen students. The book is the second oldest publication on campus, and it contains articles and original photography related to campus life, student activism, university athletics, and current events.

== History ==
Three annual publications with directories consolidated to form the Michiganensian in 1896; The Res Gestae, which was law- and academic-focused, the Palladium, which was literary with a focus on secret societies, and the Castalian, which was literary-focused. Although the name Michiganensian remains a mystery, some believe it may come from the word ensign.

Some editions of the Michiganensian as recently as the 1980s include articles about and the published names of members of the controversial secret society Michigamua. There have also been Michiganensian editors who have been Michigamua members.

In its earliest form, the Michiganensian served as an illustrated directory, providing information on organizations, fraternities, and athletics. As the publication evolved in the early 1900s, more space was dedicated to writing and photographs, but the publication still focused largely on fraternities and athletics. Now, in its current form, the Michiganensian is composed of photography and stories about campus life, student activism, current events, and athletics.

In 1954 and 1957, the Michiganensian created vinyl records titled "Michiganensian Presents: Memories in Sound" which contained audio summaries of each year and were innovative for their time.

The 2021 Michiganensian included a statement from the editorial board criticizing the University of Michigan administration and President Mark Schlissel for their handling of the COVID-19 pandemic and standing in solidarity with marginalized populations and student activists on campus in the wake of the George Floyd protests. The 2021 book's cover did not include the University of Michigan's signature maize and blue colors. The 125th issue also split with precedent by including limited fraternity and sorority coverage, amid student criticism of secret societies on campus and a nationwide 'Abolish Greek Life' movement.

== Notable alumni ==
- Margaret Bourke-White, Photographer
- Stanford Lipsey, Photo Editor
- Jay Cassidy, Photographer

== Editorial boards ==
Michiganensian Editorial Boards
Edition	Years	Editor-in-Chief	Managing Editor	Business Manager	Photo Editor	Design Editor	Content Editor
128	2023-24	Mishal Charania		Averyl Cobb			
127	2022-23	Dyanna Bateman	Mishal Charania	Ella Goulet	Gabriella Ceritano	Lily Kleinknecht, Sofia Olgado	Grace Watson, Kathy Hu
126	2021-22	Dyanna Bateman	Josie Graham	Lily Jin	Dominick Sokotoff	Lily Kleinknecht, Sofia Olgado	Sabrina Nash, Grace Watson
125	2020-21	Anirudh Hirve	Maddie Deutsch	Lily Jin	Dominick Sokotoff	Hayley Weisstuch, Dyanna Bateman	Charles Stelnicki, Josie Graham
124	2019-20	Anirudh Hirve	Jake Karalexis	Joseph Coates	Avery Kowaleski	Hayley Weisstuch	Charles Stelnicki, Maddie Deutsch
123	2018-19	Dylan LaCroix		Joseph Coates	Avery Kowaleski	Anirudh Hirve	
122	2017-18	Claire Bartosic		Matisse Rogers	Nick Linck		Dylan LaCroix
118	2013-14	Brooke Dexter					
117	2012-13	Brooke Dexter					
	2001-02	Jayme R. Love		Evan E. Busch	Abby Johnson	Krista Keller	Yvonne Humenay
	2000-01	Nathan Busch			Mike Cutri, Abby Johnson	Rick Brooks	
	1998-99	Virginia Hiltz		Jessica Hermenitt		Rick Brooks	
	1997-98	Ryan Sockalosky			Mark Wolly	Emma Cartwright	

== Awards ==
- 2020-2021 College Media Association Pinnacle Awards, Best Yearbook News Page/Spread, Third Place
- 2020-2021 College Media Association Pinnacle Awards, Best Yearbook Entertainment Page/Spread, Third Place
- 2020-2021 College Media Association Pinnacle Awards, Best Yearbook Feature Page/Spread, Honorable Mention
- 2019-2020 College Media Association Pinnacle Awards, Best Yearbook Division Page/Spread, Third Place
- 2018-2019 College Media Association Pinnacle Awards, Best Yearbook Cover Design, Third Place
- 2017 Associated Collegiate Press, Best of Show Award, Tenth Place
- 2015 Associated Collegiate Press, Best of Show Award, Eighth Place
- 2015 Herff Jones Certificate of Achievement, Perfect Performer Meeting Yearbook Deadlines
- 2014 Associated Collegiate Press, Best of Show Award, Tenth Place
- 2014 Columbia Scholastic Press Association, Gold Medalist Award
- 2014 Associated Collegiate Press, Best of Show Award, Fifth Place
- 2014 Associated Collegiate Press, All-American Rating with Five Marks of Distinction
- 2013 Columbia Scholastic Press Association, Gold Medalist Award
- 2013 Associated Collegiate Press, All-American Rating with Four Marks of Distinction
- 2012 Associated Collegiate Press, Yearbook Pacemaker Finalist
- 2011 Jostens Gotcha Covered Look Book Feature
- 2009 Associated Collegiate Press, Design of the Year Award, Second Place
- 2003 Associated Collegiate Press, Yearbook Pacemaker Finalist
- 2003 Columbia Scholastic Press Association, College Silver Crown Yearbook
- 2003 Jostens Gotcha Covered Look Book Feature
- 2002 Associated Collegiate Press, Best of Show, First Place
- 2002 Associated Collegiate Press, Yearbook Pacemaker Finalist
- 2002 Columbia Scholastic Press Association, College Gold Crown Yearbook
- 2003 Jostens Gotcha Covered Look Book Feature
- 2002 Printing Industries of America Premier Print Awards, Award of Recognition
- 2001 Associated Collegiate Press, Yearbook Pacemaker Winner
- 2001 Columbia Scholastic Press Association, Silver Medalist Certificate
- 2001 Jostens Gotcha Covered Look Book Feature
- 2001 Jostens National Yearbook Sample
- 2001 Printing Industries of America Premier Print Awards, Certificate of Merit
- 2000 Associated Collegiate Press, Yearbook Pacemaker Finalist
- 2000 Columbia Scholastic Press Association, Silver Medalist Certificate
- 1999 Columbia Scholastic Press Association, College Gold Crown Yearbook
- 1999 Columbia Scholastic Press Association, Silver Medalist Certificate
- 1999 Printing Industries of America Premier Print Awards, Award of Recognition
- 1998 Columbia Scholastic Press Association, College Gold Crown Yearbook
- 1998 Associated Collegiate Press, Yearbook Pacemaker Finalist
- 1998 Printing Industries of America Premier Print Awards, Certificate of Merit
- 1997 Columbia Scholastic Press Association, Gold Medalist Certificate
- 1996 Columbia Scholastic Press Association, Gold Medalist Certificate
- 1993 Columbia Scholastic Press Association, College Silver Crown Yearbook
- 1992 Columbia Scholastic Press Association, College Silver Crown Yearbook
- 1991 Associated Collegiate Press, First Class Merit with two Marks of Distinction
- 1991 Columbia Scholastic Press Association, Medalist Certificate
- 1990 Columbia Scholastic Press Association, First Place Certificate
- 1988 Columbia Scholastic Press Association, Second Place Certificate
- 1987 Associated Collegiate Press, First Class Merit with two Marks of Distinction
- 1986 Columbia Scholastic Press Association, First Place Certificate
- 1985 Associated Collegiate Press, First Class Merit with two Marks of Distinction
- 1985 Columbia Scholastic Press Association, First Place Certificate
- 1984 Columbia Scholastic Press Association, Certificate of Merit for Academic Spread (Ranjon O. Bose, pages 130–131)
- 1984 Columbia Scholastic Press Association, Certificate of Merit for Graphics (Bill Marsh, pages 30–31)
- 1983 Columbia Scholastic Press Association, First Place Certificate
- 1977 Columbia Scholastic Press Association, Second Place Certificate

== Internal Awards ==
=== Outstanding Staff Member Award ===
This award honors the exceptional work and contributions of a senior member who been on staff for two or more years.

Year	Staff Member
2022	Dyanna Bateman, Kelly Bickel
2021	Lily Jin, Dominick Sokotoff
2020	Joseph Coates, Anirudh Hirve
2019	Dylan LaCroix
2018	Claire Bartosic
2017	Colton Graub
2016	Alexandra Kane
2015	Bekah Malover

=== Photographer of the Year ===
Year	Photographer
1991	Jason Goldsmith
1992	Tamara Psurny
2001	Abby Johnson
2002	Tosin Akinmusuru
2005	Jon Neff, Lauren Proux, S. Christophe Tedjasukmana
2006	Chris Leonard
