= The Michigan Daily =

Newspaper in Ann Arbor, Michigan

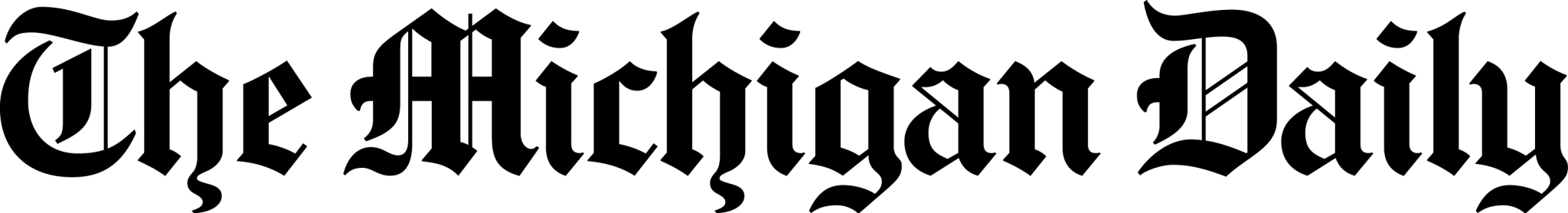

- Type: Student newspaper
- Format: Broadsheet
- Founded: September 29, 1890; 136 years ago
- School: University of Michigan

The Michigan Daily, also known as "The Daily", is the independent student newspaper of the University of Michigan published in Ann Arbor, Michigan. It was established on September 29, 1890.

A print edition of the paper is published once a week during the fall and winter terms, traditionally on Wednesdays.

== History ==
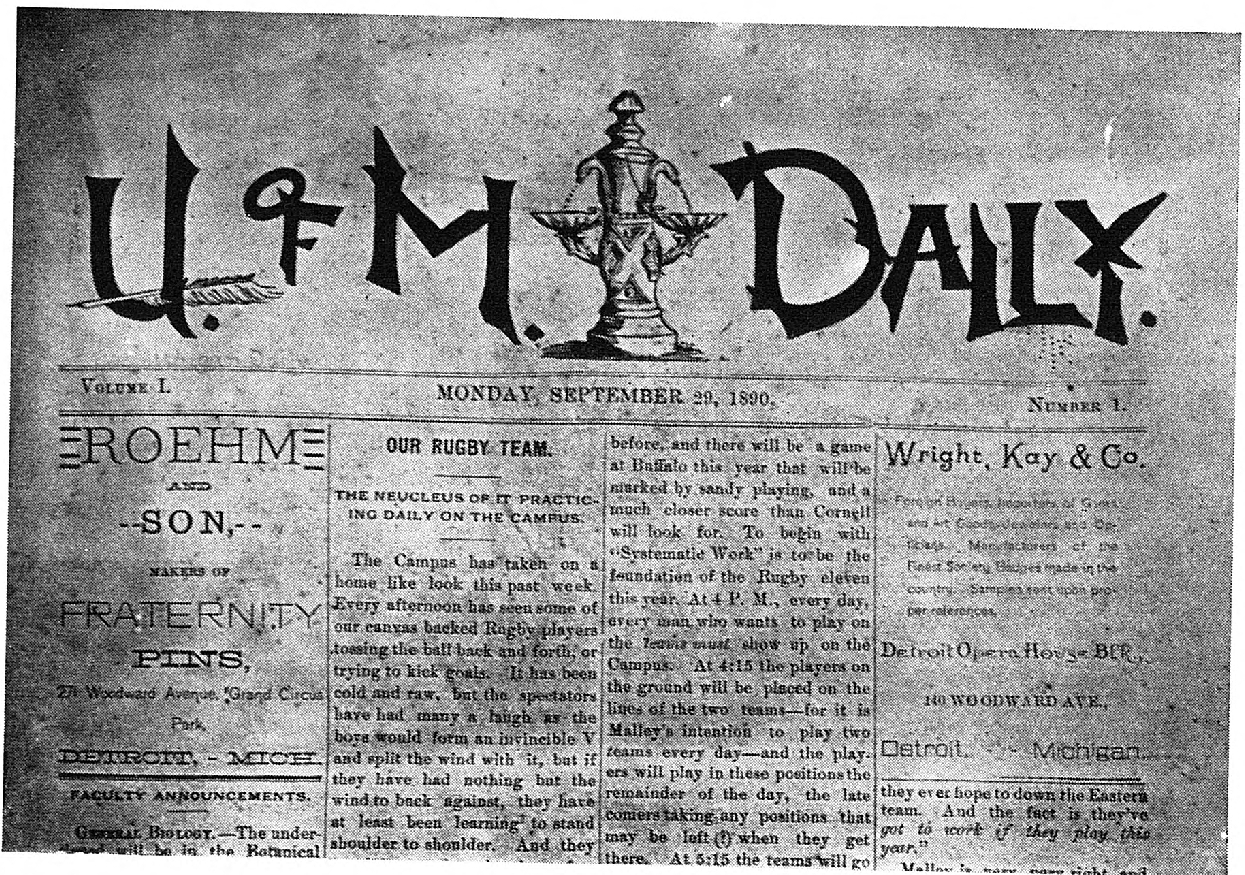
First issue of The Daily in 1890

On April 12, 1955, when the success of Jonas Salk's polio vaccine was announced at the University of Michigan the Daily was the first newspaper to report it. In 1957, the Daily sent a staff member to Little Rock, Arkansas who, pretending to be a student, attended classes on the first day of integration.

In February 1967, the Board in Control of Student Publications rejected the nomination of student Roger Rapoport for editor-in-chief, deeming him too controversial. Students fiercely opposed this administrative overreach and launched a successful pressure campaign that forced the Board to accept the students' chosen editorial slate. Two years later, in 1969, the U-M Board of Regents passed a resolution that stripped the Board of its editorial influence and its power to select editors.

The paper was the subject of national press coverage in 1967, when it urged the legalization of marijuana, and again during the Gulf War in 1991, when it called for the reinstatement of the military draft.

The Daily was instrumental in the spread of the "Paul is dead" urban legend. An October 14, 1969 Daily article by Fred LaBour and John Gray, entitled "McCartney Dead; New Evidence Brought to Light", itemized various "clues", many of them of their own invention. Their "reporting" of McCartney's death is claimed by Beatleologist Andru J. Reeve to have been "the single most significant factor in the breadth of the rumor's spread."

The first female editor-in-chief of The Daily was Harriett Woods, who later served in Missouri State government, ran for the Senate twice in the 1980s nearly beating John Danforth the first time, and led the National Women's Political Caucus through its Year of the Woman in 1992.

In 2007, renovations to the historic building at 420 Maynard Street were completed, funded entirely by private donations from alumni. To dedicate the renovated building, a reunion of the staffs of The Michigan Daily, the Michiganensian yearbook, and the Gargoyle Humor Magazine was held from October 26 to 28, 2007.

In 2017, Avery Friedman founded The Daily's podcast section.

In 2020, The Daily switched from publishing a print edition Monday-Friday to a once-a-week publication schedule.

Since 2023, The Daily has been led by two editors-in-chief due to its large staff and high content production volume.

Two former Michigan Daily staffers, Mariam Odeh and Amatullah Hakim, were arrested and indicted on conspiracy charges for coordinated vandalism of the private residences of University of Michigan regents.

== Notable alumni ==
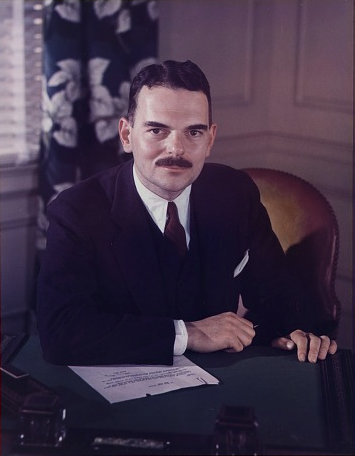
Thomas Dewey, 47th governor of New York

Many columnists and editors from The Daily have gone to hold prominent positions in government, journalism, and more, working for publications like The New York Times, The Washington Post, Associated Press, The Wall Street Journal, Time magazine, and the Chicago Tribune.

Alumni include playwright Arthur Miller, 47th governor of New York and presidential candidate Thomas Dewey, activist Tom Hayden, investment banker Bruce Wasserstein, journalist and physician Sanjay Gupta, former chairman of American Airlines George A. Spater, journalist and game show host Mike Wallace, and former lieutenant governor of Missouri Harriett Woods.

Notable journalists and writers include seven Pulitzer Prize winners: Eugene Robinson, Lisa Pollak, Ann Marie Lipinski, Amy Harmon, Stanford Lipsey, Stephen Henderson, and Arthur Miller. They also include notable broadcast journalists like du-Pont Columbia Award winner David Schechter and President - Editorial of NBC News Rebecca Blumenstein. Singer-Songwriter Avery Friedman wrote for The Daily, and launched their podcast department in 2017.

Awards won by The Daily include the 2023 National Pacemaker Award in online media, the 2025 Multiplatform Pacemaker 22 awards from the Society of Professional Journalists in 2020 and 2021, and 14 awards from the Michigan College Press Association in 2018.
