= A Lesson Is Learned but the Damage Is Irreversible =

Webcomic

A Lesson Is Learned But The Damage Is Irreversible
- Author(s): David Hellman and Dale Beran
- Website: www.alessonislearned.com
- Current status/schedule: Inactive
- Launch date: July 15, 2004
- Genre: Humor/Philosophical

A Lesson Is Learned But The Damage Is Irreversible (ALILBTDII) is a webcomic drawn by David Hellman and written by Dale Beran. Ted Rall described the comic as "explor[ing] the limits of pessimism and fatal consequence in a universe that would be difficult to imagine on the printed page." David and Dale are the primary characters, although they do not appear in every episode, and there is a small cast of real-life supporting characters, including schoolfriend/mad scientist Paul, Dale's sister Sally, and David's mother, Debby Hellman (who dated the Devil in one strip).

Dale and David, who met at The Park School of Baltimore in ninth grade, published the first strip on July 15, 2004, and since then have produced more than 40 strips. New episodes appeared with varying frequency, sometimes weekly, monthly, or occasionally after a two-month hiatus. The comic was officially "on hiatus" from September 2006 to December 10, 2012, two more comics followed that hiatus and the last update to the comic was in 2013.

== Content ==
Characters, many introduced for just one strip, are often surreal and imaginative, as with a wise yeti or breakdancing giants. Fantastical characters, often exhibiting magical or anthropomorphic qualities, include intelligent robots, cute woodland animals, and dogs.

The plots are erratic. Most episodes seemingly begin in surreal realms and hardly leave; others take root in reality. Real-world Dale beats up all the monks in a Buddhist monastery, whereupon a group of Shaolin monks seek revenge; these events span two episodes. The first 35 episodes maintain almost no continuity between strips. The few recurring characters often change appearance (especially facial hair) from strip to strip.

March 4, 2006 saw a change in direction for the comic; the first 35 strips, dating back to 2004, were retrospectively grouped as "Series One," and all episodes since have been released as part of "Series Two". While the comics of the first series generally featured the non-continuous adventures of the authors, the second series consists of loosely connected storylines with each new strip generally having some connection to previous episodes – either by following characters through more than one strip, introducing characters with a connection to others already featured or by making tangential references ("The Earthbound Clouds" pictures both the mice of the previous strip, and Kitestring's girlfriend in the next strip, without either impacting on the storyline). Prior to the hiatus, David and Dale were not featured in a Series Two comic. This changed with "I Name Thee Annihilator" in which both characters were featured in a comic similar to the style of those in Series One.

The strips are linked by recurrent themes and styles of visual play, although the specific art style varies considerably from strip to strip, and sometimes even from panel to panel. The styles range from the intricately detailed to cartoonishly simple, and apply subtle, medium-specific artistic devices, as in episodes 18 and 31. The strips usually have more than ten panels, although sometimes there is only one or no panels at all. The paneled structure frequently breaks down as panels overlap or bleed color, lines and characters into one another. Hellman drew the comic entirely on a computer, using Photoshop with a WACOM tablet.

== Response ==
A Lesson Is Learned But The Damage Is Irreversible won the 2005 Web Cartoonists' Choice Award for Outstanding Layout. In 2006 it won Outstanding Layout again, as well as Outstanding Use of Color and Outstanding Artist.

Reviewing the comic for The Webcomics Examiner, Joe Zabel described the comic as "shopping sprees of free association and mythic transcendence, peppered with sly, ironic commentary". Zabel said that "Beran has a flare for juxtaposing the otherworldly with the mundane" while "Hellman's graphic art seems ideally suited to depict Beran's reality-bending plots. His skillful draftsmanship keeps one foot firmly planted in contemporary reality, while his simple and loose rendering style and fluorescent color schemes effortlessly usher us away from this reality into a higher realm." The Webcomics Examiner named ALILBTDII one of the best webcomics of 2004 and of 2005.

In June 2006, Hellman And Beran were interviewed in the book Attitude 3: The New Subversive Online Cartoonists, edited by Ted Rall.
