= National War Museum (disambiguation) =

National War Museum may refer to:

- National War Museum (Scotland)
- National War Museum (Malta)
- South African National War Museum
- National War Museum, Umuahia (Nigeria)

== See also ==
United States

- National Civil War Museum, Harrisburg, Pennsylvania
- National Museum of the Pacific War, Fredericksburg, Texas
- National Prisoner of War Museum, Andersonville, Georgia
- National World War I Museum, Kansas City, Missouri,
- National World War II Museum, New Orleans, Louisiana
- Korean War National Museum, Chicago

Other

- National War and Resistance Museum of the Netherlands

National War Museums

- Athens War Museum
- Australian War Memorial
- Canadian War Museum
- Estonian War Museum
- Imperial War Museum, Britain
- Museum of The History of Ukraine in World War II
- War Memorial of Korea
