= WWII/Korea LVT Museum =

Military museum in California, USA

Coordinates: 33°13′5.3″N 117°23′54.6″W

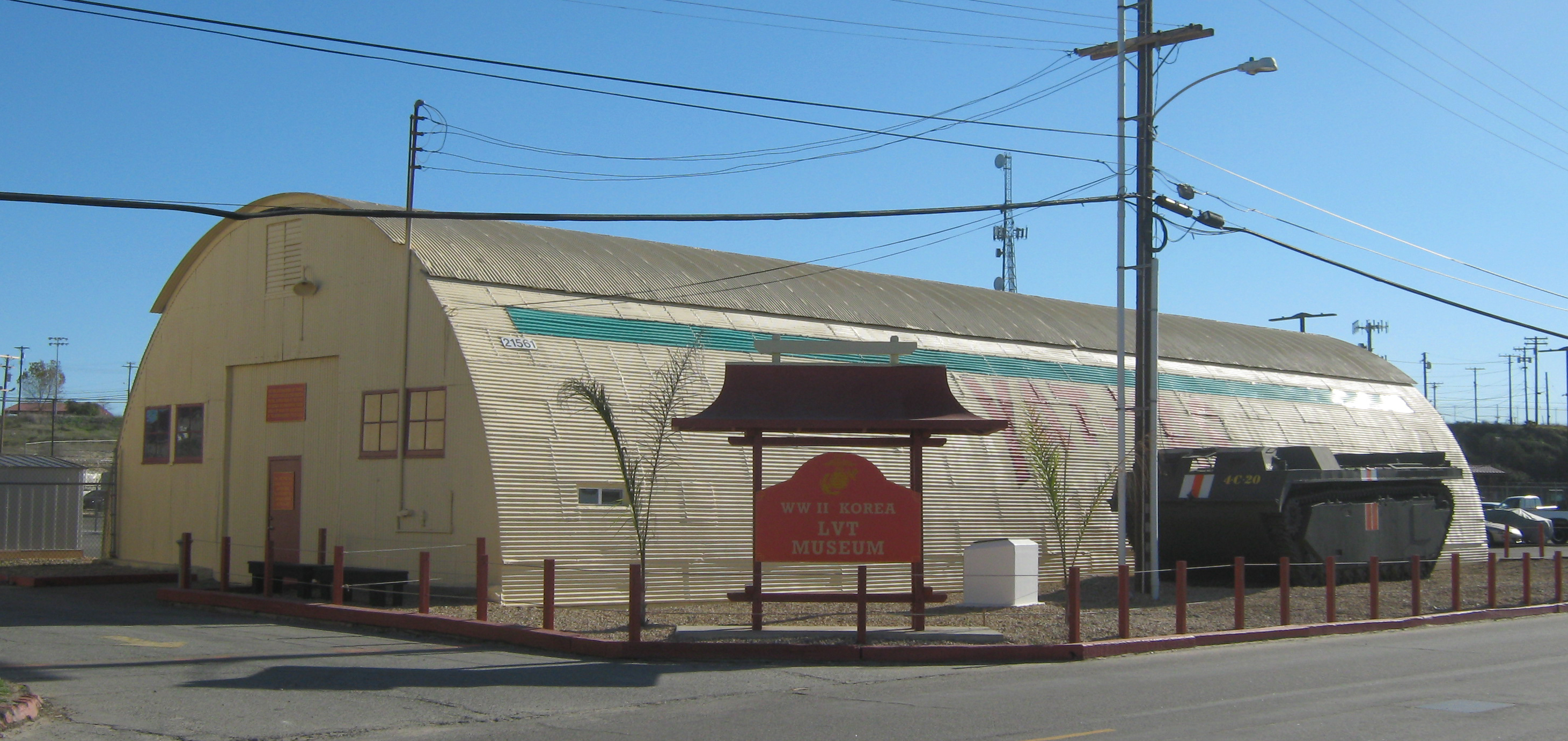
- Established: May 24, 1996
- Location: Building 21561, Kraus Street, Camp Del Mar, Marine Corps Base Camp Pendleton, California, United States
- Type: Military History
- Director: Tom Adametz

The WWII/Korea LVT Museum is located in a Quonset hut-style building at Camp Del Mar, Marine Corps Base Camp Pendleton, California, near the Assault Amphibian School Battalion Training Command. It houses exhibits on landing vehicles tracked (LVTs) from World War II and the Korean War, including six vintage models used by the US Marine Corps. The museum highlights the service of the "Alligator" Marines during the amphibious assaults of World War II and the Korean War. In 1996, the museum won the prestigious Colonel John H. Magruder III Award from the Marine Corps Heritage Foundation.

== See also ==
- Amphibious Assault Vehicle
- Korean War National Museum
