= Neil Swaab =

American artist

Neil Swaab (born 2 January 1978 in Detroit, Michigan) is a New York based artist, designer, writer, and educator. His illustrations and comics have appeared in numerous publications in the US as well as abroad in Germany, Prague, and Italy and Russia. Swaab's most famous work is Rehabilitating Mr. Wiggles, which deals with a pill-popping, foul-mouthed teddy bear. The comics frequently deal with sex, addiction, intoxication, psychosis, molestation, cross-dressing, self-hate and misanthropy. This weekly comic strip currently runs online as well as in The New York Press, Real Detroit Weekly, Internazionale (in Italian), and New Times Broward-Palm Beach.

The strip is also available online and collected in two books:

- Rehabilitating Mr. Wiggles Vol. 1, 2002. ISBN 978-0-9722182-0-7
- Attitude Featuring: Neil Swaab, Rehabilitating Mr. Wiggles (AKA Rehabilitating Mr. Wiggles Vol. 2), 2005.

In 2004, Swaab was interviewed in the book Attitude 2: The New Subversive Alternative Cartoonists, edited by award-winning syndicated editorial cartoonist Ted Rall. Attitude 2 included other cartoonists such as Alison Bechdel, David Rees and Aaron McGruder.

Swaab is currently an instructor at Parsons School of Design in the Illustration program, and has worked on Adult Swim cartoon Superjail!.
