= Single Asian Female =

American webcomic

Single Asian Female is an American webcomic depicting Asian Americans. Ethan Lee, an Asian American, created the storyline, and Lanny Liu, a Chinese American freelance illustrator, created the artwork. Some comics of Single Asian Female were printed in Hardboiled, an Asian-American newsmagazine of the University of California, Berkeley.

== History ==
By November 10, 2006, the comic had 25 strips.

== Characters ==
The comic stars Jennie Low, a 21-year-old university junior attending the University of California, Berkeley. Jennie is fourth generation Chinese American; her great grandparents on her father's side arrived to the United States at Angel Island and settled in Chinatown, San Francisco. Jennie grew up in Richmond District, San Francisco. At UC Berkeley she majors in Asian American studies. Lee said that her name derives from "Jennie Low's Chinese Cuisine," a restaurant in Mill Valley, California which Lee had patronized.

Other characters include:

Low family:

- Jennie's mother, a first generation immigrant from Guangdong, China
- Jennie's father
- Kyle: Kyle, Jackie's brother, attends Stanford University and majors in engineering
- Tina: Tina is Jackie's older sister.

Friends:

- Marie: Marie is a classmate and friend of Jennie.
- Jackie: A single mother who has a daughter, Jackie is older than Jennie and is one of her friends.
- Malcolm: Malcolm is one of Jackie's classmates. He majors in political science and African American Studies. Lee says "He's radical, and has been called an extremist. To that he replies, 'Well, black people are in an extremely bad situation, so yes, you can call me an extremist.'"
- Rob: Jackie dates Rob, a White American, for three weeks

== Development ==
Ethan Lee, a resident of the San Francisco Bay Area, formed the concept in 2003, while receiving a bachelor's degree in Asian American studies at the University of California, Berkeley. Lee, an Asian American man, said that he wanted to create Single Asian Female in order to balance negative stereotypes involving Asian American women. Lee explained that he wanted to distill the material he learned in Asian American studies classes into "a form that's easy to read and understand." By the time of the publication of the comic, Lee became a graduate student at San Francisco State University. Lanny Liu, the illustrator, graduated from the Academy of Art University with a degree in traditional illustration.

Lee originally planned to make the protagonist an Asian American male, but Lee believed that the concept was, in the words of Angela Pang of AsianWeek, "difficult and limiting." Lee gave the comic a female protagonist so it could more effectively discuss issues pertinent to Asian American women. As an example he cited a plotline about "white guys with Asian fetishes" asking Asian American women to date them. Jeff Yang of the San Francisco Chronicle said "Also, as some on the Web have suggested, people are a lot more likely to read a strip with an Asian American female protagonist -- just like they're more willing to watch news with an Asian American anchor, or more likely to accept an Asian woman as a romantic lead." Lee argued that Asian American viewpoints are not represented in American newspaper comics, and that he wanted to represent Asian American viewpoints through his webcomic. According to Lee, ideas forming the plotlines originate from his family, friends, the internet, and news sources.

== See also ==
- Angry Little Girls
- Secret Asian Man
