= Joe Sharpnack =

American cartoonist

Joe Sharpnack (born 1962) is an editorial cartoonist based out of Iowa City, Iowa in the United States.

== Early life ==
Sharpnack was raised on a ranch in Colorado. His father was the editor-in-chief of the Fort Collins Coloradoan. After he graduated high school Sharpnack traveled as a musician, and then attended the University of Iowa, where he received a degree in English in 1987.

== Career ==
While studying at the University of Iowa in Iowa City, he began his career as a political cartoonist. The Daily Iowan, the university's school paper, published Sharpnack's first cartoon, "Campus Zero," on November 3, 1986, about President Ronald Reagan and the Iran-Contra affair. While still at the University of Iowa his cartoons were syndicated by The Washington Post.

After graduating Sharpnack went to work at his first job at Chicago's Daily Southtown.

He returned to Iowa after working in Chicago, maintaining almost 40 freelance jobs with newspapers across the USA. During the 1990s he created flip books, and published an anthology- Attack of the Political Cartoonist. He held a staff position at the Cedar Rapids Gazette for ten years.

Sharpnack left the US and taught English to South Korean children in the third to sixth grades for over a year.

He joined the Iowa Rock and Roll Hall of Fame in 2014 as a drummer with the band called Oink Henderson and the Squealers.

== Rare eye ailment ==
In 2017 Sharpnack was diagnosed with a rare condition that reduced his eyesight by 26.2 percent of what it had been.

== Books ==
His work has appeared in many local, national, and international newspapers and magazines. In addition, he has produced three books, namely Attack of the Political Cartoonists, Attitude: The New Subversive Political Cartoonists, and What America Wants, America Gets: Notes from the 'G.O.P. Revolution' and Other Scary Stuff.

== Awards ==
He received the Lisagor Award while working in Chicago.

== Mention in Frazz ==
Sharpnack was mentioned in the comic strip Frazz on January 15, 2007.
