= J. P. Trostle =

American cartoonist

J.P. Trostle is a graphic designer and cartoonist, whose work often appears under the pen name of "Jape". He is the author of Attack of the Political Cartoonists: Insights And Assaults From Today's Editorial Pages, and is the current editor of the Notebook, the quarterly magazine of the Association of American Editorial Cartoonists (AAEC), and editorialcartoonists.com.

He was an award-winning illustrator for The Herald-Sun in Durham, North Carolina, and his cartoons are part of the permanent collection at Ohio State University and the State Museum of Pennsylvania.

He has also worked closely with Ted Rall on a half-dozen books, including designing the three-volume Attitude: The New Subversive Cartoonists series as well as editing Generalissimo El Busho: Essays and Cartoons on the Bush Years and Silk Road to Ruin: Is Central Asia the New Middle East.
