= Lloyd Dangle =

American cartoonist

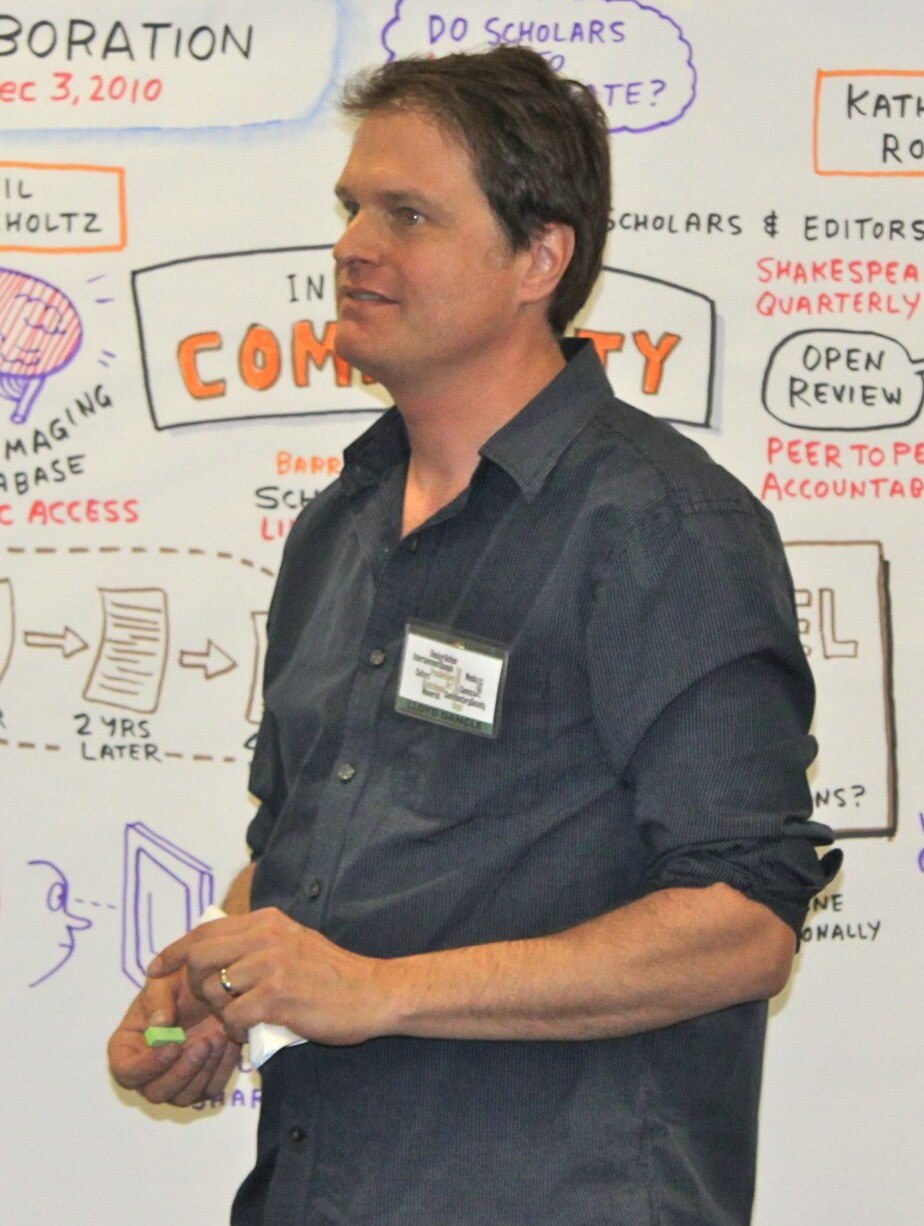
- At USC Creativity & Collaboration in 2010
- Born: May 13, 1961 (age 65) Michigan, U.S.
- Area: Cartoonist
- Notable works: Troubletown
- Spouse: Hae Yuon Kim

Lloyd Dangle (born May 13, 1961) is an American writer and cartoonist, illustrator, and political satirist.

== Early life and career ==
Lloyd Dangle was born on May 13, 1961. He graduated from Ann Arbor Huron High School in 1979, and attended the University of Michigan School of Art, graduating with a BFA in 1983. He was editor and contributor to the U of M's Gargoyle Humor Magazine.

Dangle worked as a designer, paste-up artist, and cartoonist for the Michigan Voice, an alternative newspaper in Flint, Michigan, that was founded and edited by future filmmaker Michael Moore; he served as a sound recordist on Moore's first movie, Roger and Me.

After leaving Michigan in 1983 he moved to New York City and worked for magazines and newspapers including Elle, Manhattan, Inc., Nuclear Times, and The Village Voice as a production artist.

== Advocacy projects ==
Dangle has contributed to AIDS education efforts, particularly for IV drug users, including art-directing the handbook The Works, used in prisons and drug rehabilitation clinics. He created a billboard, TV, and print campaign around a superhero, Bleachman, whose duty was to teach IV drug users to clean their needles at a time when needle exchange programs were illegal in California.

Dangle has served as Northern California chapter president and as national president of the Graphic Artists Guild, having helped found the former. He also lobbied the United States Congress in favor of the unsuccessful Freelance Artists and Writers Self Protection Act, introduced by Michigan Senator John Conyers in 2002, which intended to extend collective bargaining rights to freelance artists and writers negotiating with large media companies.

== Troubletown ==
Troubletown was a syndicated weekly comic strip by Dangle. Most strips involve political satire from a liberal perspective. Begun in 1988 at the San Francisco Bay Guardian, it went on to run in many alternative press weeklies, including The Stranger, The Portland Mercury, and the Austin Chronicle. It also appeared regularly in The Progressive magazine.

Dangle retired Troubletown at the end of April 2011.

Several book collections of Troubletown have been published. It was also featured in the anthology Attitude: The New Subversive Cartoonists.

== Publications ==
=== Comics ===
- Dangle #1 (Cat-Head Comics, (1991)
- Dangle #1–4 (Drawn & Quarterly) (1993–1995) — first issue republishes Dangle #1 from Cat-Head Comics
- Contract with Troubletown and Other Cartoons (self-published, 1995)
- Troubletown #5: Focus-Group Tested (self-published, 1997)
- TroubleTown [#6]: Funky Hipster Trash (self-published, 1998)
- Troubletown #7: Troubletown: Manifestos and Stuff (self-published, 2000)

=== Books ===
- (with writer Lynn Gordon) Real Recipes For Casual Cooks (Main Street Books, 1996) ISBN 978-0385482080
- Next Stop: Troubletown (Manic D Press, 1996) ISBN 978-0916397449
- Troubletown: Axis of Trouble (Top Shelf Productions, 2003) ISBN 978-0972354400
- (with The Mission Collective and M. Ryan Hess, editor) The Ten Minute Activist: Easy Ways to Take Back the Planet (Nation Books, 2006) ISBN 978-1560259701
- Troubletown Told You So: Comics that Could've Saved Us from this Mess (Top Shelf Productions, 2007) ISBN 978-0972354417
