= Greg Peters (cartoonist) =

American cartoonist

Peters in the mid-2000s

Greg Peters (September 24, 1962, in Marquette, Michigan – August 2, 2013, in Jefferson, Louisiana) was an American editorial cartoonist best known for his détournement-based comic strips "Suspect Device" and "Snake Oil".

== Professional life ==
Peters began producing "Suspect Device" in 1996, when he was working at the Times of Acadiana as a graphic designer and his editor asked him to produce a cartoon about gambling. "Suspect Device" appeared in the Times until 1998, when — in the wake of a dispute with his publisher over whether to publish an installment of "Suspect Device" that might offend an advertiser— Peters and his editor both resigned; "Suspect Device" then appeared in Gambit from 1999 until 2010.

In 2003, he launched "Snake Oil", in The Independent.

In addition to cartooning, Peters worked at Louisiana State University Press.

== Honors ==
In their 2003 awards, the Association of Alternative Newsweeklies gave "Suspect Device" an "Honorable Mention" in the category "Cartoon: 4 or fewer papers", specifically citing "Peters' dry, allusive wit", skill at collage, and "opinions (that) are frequently unexpected".

In 2004, Peters participated in an exhibition at the Museum of Comic and Cartoon Art.

In 2006, the Louisiana Press Association awarded him first place for Editorial Cartoon.

In their 2007 awards, the National Newspaper Association ranked Peters second in the category "Best Original Editorial Cartoon (non-daily)".

== Personal life ==
Peters moved to Louisiana in 1990, after he discovered that graduate school applications fees were cheaper there.

He was a frequent contributor to the Dysfunctional Family Circus, whose reuse of copyrighted graphics has been described as "the foundation for Suspect Device's format".

== Health ==
Suspect Device for July 7, 2009, in which Peters discusses his health.

Peters had aortic stenosis and throughout his life underwent multiple surgeries to correct this.
