= Some Guy with a Website =

XQUZYPHYR & Overboard
- Author(s): August J. Pollak
- Website: http://www.xoverboard.com/
- Launch date: 2004-01-07
- Genre(s): political, parody

Some Guy with a Website (formerly known as XQUZYPHYR & Overboard) is a political webcomic and blog by August J. Pollak. The cartoon first started in October 1999 when Pollak was a freshman at New York University and drew the cartoon for NYU's student-run paper, Washington Square News. Because it was a student-run paper the cartoon only ran during the school year; starting in 2004, after Pollak had graduated, the strip appeared weekly year-round. New comics appear online on Mondays.

On October 16, 2006, Pollak announced that the strip will be changed: the format has changed from "full-page" to "half-page", and most significantly the two title characters will be phased out (apart from the special Christmas strips) and the strip accordingly renamed to Some Guy With A Website.

== Characters and Themes ==
The strips are essentially independent of one another, but prior to late 2006, Pollak used (albeit increasingly rarely) the two titular returning characters (seen in this strip having a rare break from politicking):

XQUZYPHYR – origin and pronunciation of name unknown. XQUZYPHYR is a shadowy figure in a brown trenchcoat and hat. His legs have almost never been drawn, but on those rare occasions when they are visible they are clad in brown trousers. This all gives XQUZYPHYR the appearance of Marvin the Martian playing Philip Marlowe. He tends to be the calmer (i.e., more rational and articulate) of the two when they appear.

Overboard – known to his friends (e.g. XQUZYPHYR) as Ovie, Overboard is a jowly yellow individual in a pink shirt. His right eye is larger than the other and appears to be bloodshot. He perennially wears a captain's hat, which could be said to explain his name, but arguably just gives further clues as to its origin. Owns a cat named Rightwing Conspiracy (RC for short) who occasionally makes an appearance, and serves as the logo and mascot of xoverboard.com. On certain holidays, the logo changes similar to Google and other sites.

Because of the last few years of the strip taking on topical politics themes, XQUZYPHYR & Overboard rarely appear in the strips themselves. (In 2006, neither appeared in a strip until April) They usually appear only to provide a narrative position or to set up the premise, for example, comparing celebrities to political figures.

Christmas Strips – A definite exception to XQUZYPHYR & Overboard as irrelevant characters is the "Christmas strip," which is usually the last strip Pollak draws for the year, is multiple pages, and focuses entirely on XQUZYPHYR & Overboard engaging in a storyline, usually reflective of a pop culture trend of the year: for example, the National Zoo's baby Panda (2005), the "secularizing" of Christmas (2004), and Quentin Tarantino movies (2003).

Other recurring themes in the strip include:

Some Guy With A Website – a satire of self-important bloggers who believe their endeavours to be superior to and\or on the verge of replacing the "mainstream media". The first and most famous strip to feature this concept (published September 13th 2004) is available as a poster from Pollak's store.

The Ghost of Adolf Hitler – who shows up at various intervals to illustrate the spurious comparisons people often make, either to himself or to others. The Ghost of Hitler is illustrated as a shimmering skeleton in a Nazi cap and swastika armband.

== Collections ==
Material from the strip is included in the webcomic anthology Attitude 3: The New Subversive Online Cartoonists.

Pollak also sells self-published print collections of about 35 cartoons each available directly from the website; there are currently two books: Ridiculousy Simple Graphs and Other Observations from XQUZYPHYR & Overboard, and Monkeys Flinging Poo and Other Great Moments in Media Punditry.
