= The Perry Bible Fellowship =

Webcomic and newspaper comic strip

- Cover of the 2009 book collection
- Author: Nicholas Gurewitch
- Website: pbfcomics.com
- Current status/schedule: Occasional comics only
- Launch date: 2001 (25 years ago)
- Genre(s): Surreal humor, dark humor

The Perry Bible Fellowship (abbreviated to PBF) is a webcomic and newspaper comic strip by Nicholas Gurewitch. It first appeared in the Syracuse University newspaper The Daily Orange in 2001.

The comics are usually three or four panels long, and are generally characterized by the juxtaposition of whimsical childlike imagery or fantasy with morbid, sudden or unexpected surreal humor. Common subjects include ironical occurrences, religion, sex, war, science fiction, suicide, violence, and death.

The comic has won an Eisner Award, two Ignatz Awards, and three Harvey Awards.

== Publishing ==
The Perry Bible Fellowship first appeared in 2001 in the Syracuse student newspaper The Daily Orange. In an interview, Gurewitch said that the title was "borrowed from an actual church, from a place called Perry, in Maine". Gurewitch also worked as the art director for The Daily Orange for a semester in 2002 while at Syracuse University.

By 2006 the comic was being printed in The Guardian, UK's Maxim, New York Press, Boston's Weekly Dig, Portland Mercury, and The Baltimore City Paper, and by 2007 was being printed in The Chicago Reader. In a 2007 interview, Gurewitch stated that he was making a living from PBF.

On February 18, 2008, Gurewitch announced he was cutting back on the production of the comic strip, saying "I feel I owe it to myself and the Perry Bible Fellowship not to turn a joyful diversion into a long career." Previously a weekly strip, it is now infrequently updated; as of January 2021, it is still receiving updates occasionally.

== Art ==
The art in The Perry Bible Fellowship varies from strip to strip. While some comics feature simplistic human figures with little more than a mouth and eyes for a face, other strips are extensively colored and meticulously detailed. Sometimes, the artistic style changes within the strip itself. A recurring feature of the strip is simplistically-drawn human figures exhibiting little detail or realism, and heads reminiscent of smiley faces. Some strips emulate the styles of famous illustrators such as Shel Silverstein, Edward Gorey, and Robert Crumb, made evident by marginal notes such as "(Apologies, R. Crumb)".

== Books ==
In 2007, a book collection was published, titled The Trial of Colonel Sweeto and Other Stories. Even before its release, preorders alone made the book one of the fastest-selling graphic novels on Amazon.com, causing publisher Dark Horse Comics to increase its first print run to 36,000, and print the book domestically to hasten distribution; it has since gone into three printings. Dark Horse Comics also noted the comic's popularity in the UK, as Diamond UK put in the largest order Dark Horse has ever seen from them.

The second book, The Perry Bible Fellowship Almanack, a 256-page hardcover compilation, features more comics (including the ones from the previous book) and previously unreleased material including unused strips, an interview with David Malki and a foreword by Diablo Cody. The book was released on February 18, 2009, again from Dark Horse Comics. A tenth anniversary edition of the Almanack was published on February 11, 2020.

== Reception ==
Ted Rall included Gurewitch and The Perry Bible Fellowship in his 2006 book, Attitude 3: The New Subversive Online Cartoonists. Rall described the comic as "a webcomics phenom", saying it had "leapt from widespread popularity among the technocrati to... mainstream print media". Rall called it a "twisted blending of the cute and profane", saying that "a lot of [its] humor involves violence, but the horror is tempered with a gentle, sweet tone." Boing Boing, reviewing the 2009 printed Almanack, called PBF "a concentrated dose of the kind of dark, twisted humor that makes you bark with laughter and look away at the same time...complemented by Gurewitch's visual style, which veers from the simplistic and cartoonish to incredibly detailed line art that's like something out of Tony Millionaire."

Webcomics reviewer Eric Burns said in 2008 that "Perry Bible Fellowship is a comic that works in subversion humor... and Gurewitch is a master at it... The problem is, this is a well that's way too easy to drain dry. Twenty or thirty times, you'll get a horrified laugh. Then, people will expect it. Finally, it will have no impact. It's just what Perry Bible Fellowship does." Burns did praise the artistic style, and said that "when he's on his A game, it's hard to think of anyone who's better in webcomics – particularly in four panel gag-a-day."

The Verge described PBF in a 2020 article as "one of the internet’s most beloved webcomics", saying that it "seamlessly match[es] hand-drawn artistry with subtle but devastating punchlines that reveal a heartbreaking truth about the world."

=== Awards ===
Year	Award	Category	Result	Notes
2008	Eisner Award	Best Humor Publication	Won	Awarded specifically for the printed compilation, Perry Bible Fellowship: The Trial of Colonel Sweeto and Other Stories.
2008	Harvey Award	Best Online Comic Special Award for Humor	Won	
2008	Web Cartoonists' Choice Awards	Outstanding Short Form Comic	Won	
2008	Web Cartoonists' Choice Awards	Outstanding Comic Outstanding Comedic Comic Outstanding Artist	Nominated	
2007	Harvey Award	Best Online Comic	Won	
2007	Web Cartoonists' Choice Awards	Outstanding Comic Outstanding Comedic Comic Outstanding Short Form Comic	Won	
2007	Web Cartoonists' Choice Awards	Outstanding Artist	Nominated	
2006	Ignatz Award	Outstanding Online Comic	Won	
2006	Web Cartoonists' Choice Awards	Outstanding Comic Outstanding Comedic Comic Outstanding Short Form Comic	Won	
2006	Web Cartoonists' Choice Awards	Outstanding Artist	Nominated	
2005	Ignatz Award	Outstanding Online Comic	Won	
2005	Web Cartoonists' Choice Awards	Outstanding Comedic Comic Outstanding Short Form Comic	Won	

== Author ==
Nicholas Gurewitch was born on March 9, 1982, in Canandaigua, New York, and is currently based in Rochester, New York. He attended Syracuse University, where he studied film and where his comic strip was first published in The Daily Orange. Besides The Perry Bible Fellowship, Gurewitch released the book Notes on a Case of Melancholia, or: A Little Death. NPR described Melancholia in 2020 as a "surprisingly uplifting" comedy about the personification of death. Gurewitch also worked on developing a program called Daisy Garden Story Time with Comedy Central, though the program was not produced.

Nicholas is the cousin of comedian and Last Week Tonight writer Dan Gurewitch.
