= Secret Asian Man =

Weekly comic strip by Tak Toyoshima

- Author: Tak Toyoshima
- Website: secretasianmancomics.blogspot.com
- Current status/schedule: Current weekly strip
- Launch date: 1999; 27 years ago
- Syndicate(s): United Feature Syndicate (July 16, 2007 – September 19, 2009)
- Genre(s): Humor, Satire, Autobiography

Secret Asian Man is a discontinued weekly comic strip written and drawn by Tak Toyoshima. The strip covers the author's biography and Asian-American issues. Secret Asian Man often centers its discussion on what it means to be Asian American, as well as other race- and ethnic-related issues. Its title is a mondegreen referring to the song "Secret Agent Man".

== Publication history ==
The strip appeared weekly starting in 1999, and was published in Boston's Weekly Dig, Metro Silicon Valley, San Jose Mercury News, RedEye, Nichi Bei Times, AsianWeek, Georgia Asian Times, The Everett Herald, and on the internet.

Secret Asian Man was picked up for syndication by United Feature Syndicate (United Media) for its daily run on comics.com, which ran from July 16, 2007, to September 19, 2009.

On May 12, 2013, Toyoshima announced that the strip was going on hiatus.

== Characters and story ==
All episodes of Secret Asian Man feature Osamu "SAM (Secret Asian Man)" Takahashi, who is a Japanese-American artist modeled after the author. SAM has three major friends: Richie, a white man; Charlie, a black man; and Grace Patterson, an East Asian American who was adopted by White parents. Along with them, SAM also has a cynical and sarcastic spiky-haired cousin named Simon. SAM's wife Marie is Italian, and they have a son named Shintaro, and a newborn son, Bob.

== See also ==
- Angry Little Girls
- Attitude: The New Subversive Cartoonists
- Badmash.org
- Da Vinci's Notebook
- Single Asian Female
