= Stanford Lipsey =

American newspaper publisher and photographer

- Born: October 8, 1927; Omaha, Nebraska, U.S.
- Died: November 1, 2016 (aged 89); Rancho Mirage, California, U.S.
- Resting place: Forest Lawn Cemetery
- Education: Omaha Central High School
- Alma mater: University of Michigan
- Occupation: Newspaper publisher
- Spouses: Jeanne Blacker; Judith Hojnacki
- Children: 1 son, 1 daughter
- Parent(s): Jacob Lipsey; Molly Brick

Stanford Lipsey (October 8, 1927 – November 1, 2016) was an American journalist, photographer, and newspaper publisher. He was born in Omaha, Nebraska. His parents, Molly Brick and Jacob Lipsey, were Jewish Russian immigrants.

Lipsey was educated at the Omaha Central High School and graduated from the University of Michigan in 1948.

== Background and career ==
Lipsey got his first experience in the newspaper business as a photographer for his high school newspaper, the Central High Register. Later, he was the photography editor for his university yearbook, at the University of Michigan. During the Korean War, he was editor of the Air Pulse newspaper at Offutt Air Force Base, while serving in the Air Force Reserve.

In 1953, Lipsey began working at the Omaha Sun, a chain of weekly newspapers that comprised seven paid and five free newspapers in Omaha, Nebraska. He worked as a photographer and writer. Later, he purchased the Sun. In 1969, he sold the struggling newspapers to Berkshire Hathaway, led by Warren Buffett, but remained there, as president and publisher. In 1988, he became a vice president of Berkshire Hathaway as they continued to try to increase profitability.

In 1972, the staff of the Sun Newspapers won the John Hancock Award for Excellence in Business Writing and the Pulitzer Prize for Local Investigative Specialized Reporting for their series of stories investigating Boys Town, which led to reforms of the nonprofit. This was the first time that the Pulitzer Prize had been awarded to a small newspaper. The Omaha Press Club inducted the (then-defunct) Omaha Sun Newspapers in 2008 into their initial Journalists of Excellence Hall of Fame for the team's work on the Boys Town series.

Berkshire sold the Sun in 1980 and publication ceased three years later, after a legal battle with their competitor, the Omaha World-Herald. After Berkshire purchased the Buffalo Evening News in 1977, Lipsey traveled to Buffalo, at Buffett's request, and later served as publisher of the Buffalo News for 30 years. Lipsey was named as publisher emeritus in 2012.

== Philanthropy ==
Lipsey was well known in Buffalo as a publisher, but an article written about him by the Community Foundation for Greater Buffalo summed up his life of philanthropy with the words:

"Stanford Lipsey is best known in our community as the longtime publisher of The Buffalo News. In the business of breaking news and headlines, he was a quintessential newsman who successfully ran the newspaper for almost 30 years. However, the real story that captures Lipsey’s life is his legacy of philanthropy that continues to move Buffalo forward today."

— Community Foundation for Greater Buffalo, Stanford Lipsey Scholarship Fund: Honoring a Legendary Philanthropist

Some of his charitable works and awards he received include:

- 1989 the New York State Governor's Arts Award from NY Governor Mario Cuomo for sponsoring the longest running free jazz concert series in the country: The annual summer Buffalo News Jazz at Albright-Knox Concert. As of 2016, it had run each summer for 35 years.
- 1997 Spirit of Wright Award for leading the largest Frank Lloyd Wright restoration project: the Darwin Martin House, in Buffalo, NY. The largest restoration project in the world.
- 1998 the New York State Governor's Parks, Preservation, and Historic Restoration Award from NYS Governor, George Pataki.
- 2011 Lipsey established the Central High School Foundation where he attended high school in Omaha, NE.
- 2016 Lipsey (legacy donor) and his wife made a multi-million dollar donor to the preservation and restoration of the Richardson Olmsted Complex, in Buffalo, NY. He had advocated fundraising in 2006 with Governor George Pataki.
- Lipsey established a Charitable Remainder Trust, and in 2016 the proceeds were paid to the Jewish Federation of Omaha, for the benefit of The Jewish Press.

Lipsey served the community, not just with charitable giving, but as a public servant too. The Desert Sun published an extensive list of board memberships in his obituary, as shown below:

"Lipsey served on the boards of the American Newspaper Publisher Association, Artpark & Company, Buffalo Niagara Partnership, Buffalo Philharmonic Orchestra Board, Buffalo State College Foundation, Business Council of New York State, Canisius College, Greater Buffalo Development Foundation, Jewish Foundation of WNY, Junior League Decorator Show House, Korean War National Museum, Marine Midland Bank, Martin House Restoration Corporation, National Conference of Christians and Jews, National Multiple Sclerosis Society, Nebraska/Iowa Chapter, Newspaper Advertising Bureau, Richardson Restoration Corporation, Roswell Park Comprehensive Cancer Center Community Council, the University of Buffalo Foundation, and the Guide Dogs of the Desert in Palm Springs, CA, that led to the adoption of his loyal dog, Linus. He was also a MacCallum Theatre Founder's Member, and a member of Morningside Country Club."

== Personal life and death ==
Lipsey had a passion for the arts, and was an accomplished photographer, having a special appreciation for architecture and landscapes. His photography was exhibited at 13 museum and gallery exhibitions, including his alma mater, the University of Michigan, at the James and Anne Duderstadt Center Art Gallery. The exhibit, titled "Affinity of Form" featured 48 large-scale images that had been published by powerHouse books.

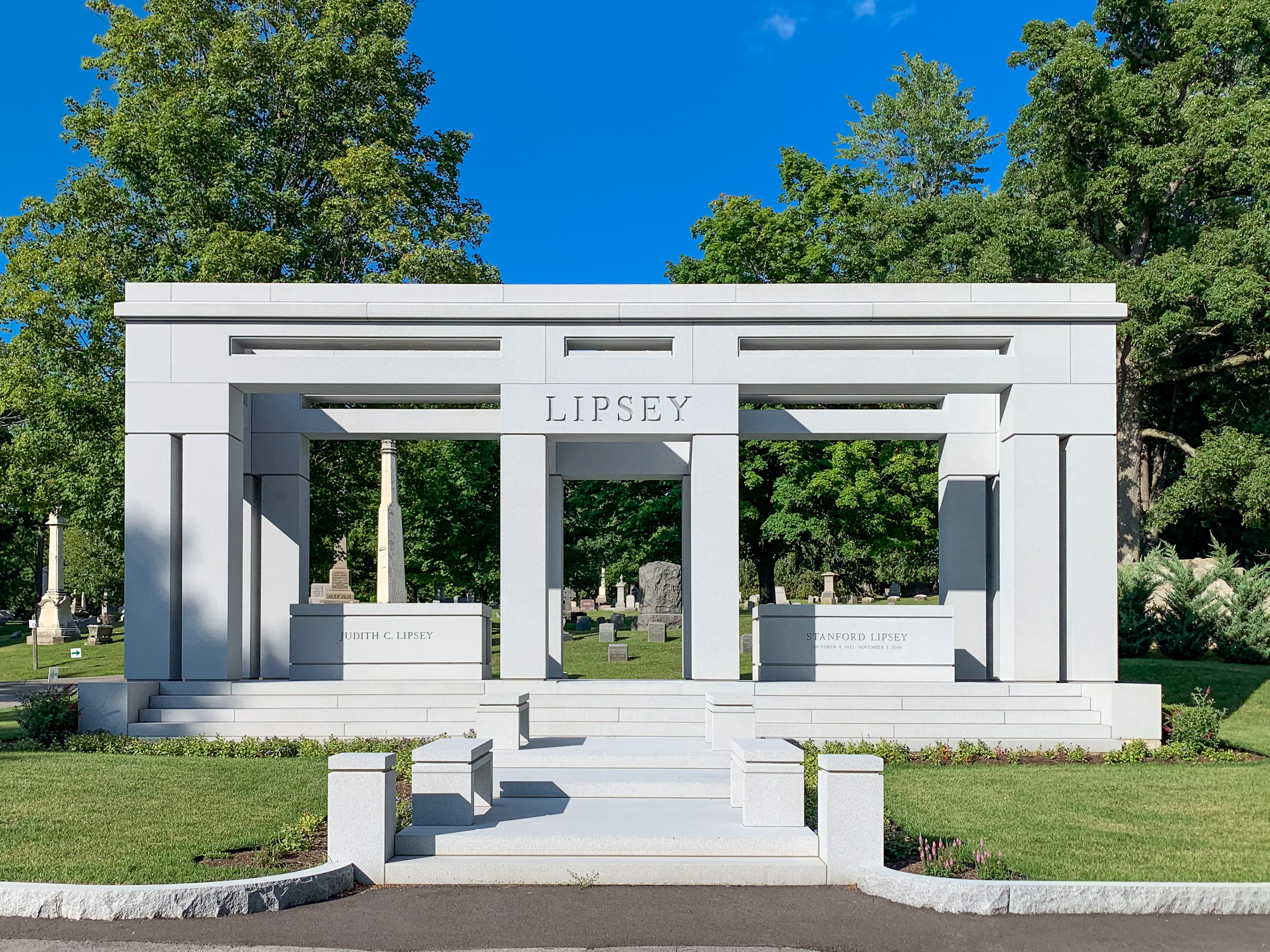
Lipsey's memorial in Forest Lawn Cemetery

Lipsey was widely respected and his philanthropic endeavors supported a broad range of community service ranging from historic preservation to assistance for the SPCA. After learning of his death, U.S. Sen. Charles Schumer referred to Lipsey as "Buffalos true guardian angel" and NY Governor Andrew Cuomo said, "Today, we lost a great New Yorker, but as we mourn his loss, we can find comfort that he was able to see his dream for Buffalo in action. There was no better friend to Buffalo than Stan Lipsey, and for that, we will always be grateful."

His death was memorialized in a tribute to his life and contributions to the community by members of the New York State Senate in a NY Senate Resolution: "Mourning the death of Stanford Lipsey, veteran, philanthropist, Pulitzer Prize acclaimed publisher and former publisher of the Buffalo News."

Lipsey was married twice: first to Jeanne Blacker, and secondly to Judith Hojnacki. He had a son and a daughter from his first marriage. He resided in Rancho Mirage, California, where he died on November 1, 2016.
