= Boy on a Stick and Slither =

Webcomic

- The Boy and Slither in the 2011 strip "Any Day Now"
- Author: Steven L. Cloud
- Website: http://www.boasas.com/
- Current status/schedule: Infrequently updated
- Launch date: 1998
- Genre: Existential Humor

Boy on a Stick and Slither (sometimes abbreviated as BOASAS) is a webcomic by Steven L. Cloud. Strips usually feature a short, pithy and sometimes surreal exchange between the title characters. The strip is characterized by dry and cynical humor.

== History ==
Boy on a Stick and Slither was first uploaded in 1999 and was originally a member of webcomics collective Dumbrella. Though Boy on a Stick and Slither primarily exists on the web, it has also been published in The Atlanta Journal-Constitution and in Esquire magazine. In April 2007, the webcomic was picked up by United Media, which syndicated the webcomic online at Comics.com until February 2009. Boy on a Stick and Slither has since been hosted on its own website.

== Style ==
Tym Godek of The Webcomics Examiner described Boy on a Stick and Slither as with saying "Nothing in BOASAS stands still. Jittering characters, constantly shifting backgrounds and frequent non-sequiturs proliferate through the webcomic." Cloud's day job in online marketing is apparent in the strip's design, as Boy on a Stick and Slither looks very cognizant of color and layout. Michael Whitney of Comixtalk prompted that "aesthetically, the strip smacks of commercial art: full page ads and catalog layouts." Cloud breaks the mold in composition, frequently experimenting with backgrounds and panel layouts. Cloud noted in an interview that color is very important to him, and he described picking colors for any given strip as "probably my favorite thing to do." For print publications, Cloud draws alternate black-and-white versions of his strips.

== Characters ==
Steven Cloud conceptualized the titular "Boy on a Stick" as he was doodling a boy's head one day and didn't want to mess it up with a poorly-drawn body. He drew a simple rectangular shape below the neck, and to his surprise, the design worked out fairly well. He gave him Slither as a friend, because Cloud found snakes to be exceedingly simple to draw. Cloud wanted his characters to become iconic and easily recognizable, like the characters in Peanuts. The Boy on a Stick gradually developed a highly optimistic personality, while Slither became a pessimistic character: Cloud said of the Boy on a Stick and Slither that "the characters allow me to debate myself. They're the best and worst of me." Godek of The Webcomics Examiner described Boy on a Stick as "the voice of innocence and possibility" who is paired with Slither, "the voice of cynicism and negation." However, Godek also described both characters is inherently nihilistic, though the Boy in a more cheerful manner. Whitney of Comixtalk, meanwhile, described the two characters as "icons or stand-ins for any two people."

Other characters in Boy on a Stick and Slither play a very minor role, and were primarily created when Cloud was low on ideas. Two characters, the "Florida Cracker" and "Frickles Mudcat", helped Cloud present political topics during the 2004 presidential election.

== In Print ==
- Material from Boy on a Stick and Slither was included in Attitude 3: The New Subversive Online Cartoonists.
- Boy on a Stick and Slither appeared weekly in The Charlotte Observer from 2007–2008.
- Boy on a Stick and Slither appeared weekly in The Atlanta Journal-Constitution (2001–2002)
- Boy on a Stick and Slither appeared in the October 2002 issue of Esquire (p. 70)
