= Andy Singer =

American political cartoonist (born 1965)

Andy Singer is an American political cartoonist born in 1965.

== Career ==
He began publishing cartoons in 1992 in University of California Berkeley's student newspaper, The Daily Californian. Since 1992, his cartoons have appeared in hundreds of newspapers, magazines, websites, books and exhibitions around the world. These include The New Yorker, The New York Times, Funny Times, Z magazine, La Décroissance, Neweekly (in China), Boston.com, Forbes.com, NPR.org, NBC.com, Bloomberg.com, Wired.com, a 2021-22 outdoor exhibit on the Artwall Gallery in Prague, and a major outdoor exhibit on Paulista Avenue in São Paulo Brazil, as part of Virada Sustentável in 2020.

== Titles ==
He's the author of 4 books. The first, CARtoons (2001, Car Busters Press, ISBN 978-80-238-7020-6), has been translated into several languages, including French (Echappe, 2007, ISBN 978-2-915830-03-3) and a Portuguese language edition, published by Autonomia Literária in Brazil in 2017 (ISBN 978-85-69536-17-8). His second book, Attitude Featuring Andy Singer NO EXIT (2004, Nantier Beall Minoustchine Publishing, ISBN 978-1-56163-408-8) was part of series of books by NBM publishing, edited by fellow cartoonist Ted Rall. His third book was Ils M'Énervent (Mais Je Garde Mon Calme) (2006, Berg International Éditeurs, ISBN 978-2-911289-91-0), a compilation of cartoons, translated into French. His most recent book was Why We Drive, published in 2013 by Microcosm Publishing (ISBN 978-1-62106-486-2).

His work has also appeared in numerous cartoon compilations. These include "Long Story Short" (Akashic Books, 2020, ISBN 978-1-61775-796-9), "Treasury of Mini Comics, Volume 1" (Fantagraphics Books, 2013, ISBN 978-1-60699-657-7), "Superheroes Strip Artists, & Talking Animals" (Minnesota Historical Society Press, 2011, ISBN 978-0-87351-777-5), and "Attitude: The New Subversive Political Cartoonists" (NBM Publishing 2002, ISBN 978-1-56163-317-3).

== Personal life ==
Andy grew up in New York City and Berkeley, California and graduated from Cornell University with bachelor's degrees in Fine Arts and Art History. He currently lives in Saint Paul, Minnesota and serves as volunteer co-chair of the Saint Paul Bicycle Coalition.
