= Animated political cartoons =

Genre of political animation

Animated political cartoons are the evolution of the editorial cartoon. They can be published through a variety of platforms, including newsreels, online newspapers, television, and websites.

== Emergence ==
Animated political cartoons were created as newsreels in the 1910s. From about 1914 to 1918, Harry Julius created cutout animation newsreels in this genre for the Australasian Gazette. By the 1970s, cartoonists such as Peter Nicholson produced political cartoon series for news agencies. Nicholson later created the popular series, Rubbery Figures, in the 1980s.

With the dot com crash at the turn of the millennium, artists and animators were among the first to be let go at online news sites. Early pioneers such as Pat Oliphant stopped adding content shortly after. Others, however, have carved out a market for their trade. JibJab gained notability on the internet with their cartoon This Land! in 2004. Mark Fiore's animations have appeared in SFGate for years, where he has published weekly cartoons. Zina Saunders creates regular animations for Mother Jones.

== Notable cartoonists ==
- Ann Telnaes, for The Guardian and the Washington Post
- Matt Buck ("Hack"), for the Tribune, ITN, and Channel 4 News
- Shujaat Ali, for Aljazeera.net
- Peter Nicholson, for The Australian ; produced series in the 1970s and 1980s
- Walt Handelsman, for New York Newsday

== See also ==
- List of editorial cartoonists
