= Troubletown =

U.S. comic strip, 1988-2011

- Author(s): Lloyd Dangle
- Current status/schedule: Ended
- Launch date: 1988
- End date: 2011
- Syndicate(s): Self-syndicated
- Genre(s): Humor, Political comics, Satirical comics

Troubletown was a syndicated weekly comic strip by American cartoonist Lloyd Dangle. Begun in 1988, it ran in many alternative weeklies, including The Stranger, The Portland Mercury, and The Austin Chronicle. It also appeared in The Progressive magazine. Most strips involved political satire from a liberal perspective.

Several book collections of Troubletown have been published. It is also featured in the anthology Attitude: The New Subversive Cartoonists.

Dangle retired his Troubletown strip at the end of April 2011.

== Collections ==
=== Comics ===
- Contract with Troubletown and Other Cartoons (self-published, 1995)
- Troubletown #5: Focus-Group Tested (self-published, 1997)
- TroubleTown [#6]: Funky Hipster Trash (self-published, 1998)
- Troubletown #7: Troubletown: Manifestos and Stuff (self-published, 2000)

=== Books ===
- Next Stop: Troubletown (Manic D Press, 1996) ISBN 978-0916397449
- Troubletown: Axis of Trouble (Top Shelf Productions, 2003) ISBN 978-0972354400
- Troubletown Told You So: Comics that Could've Saved Us from this Mess (Top Shelf Productions, 2007) ISBN 978-0972354417
