= Stephanie McMillan =

American cartoonist (born 1965)

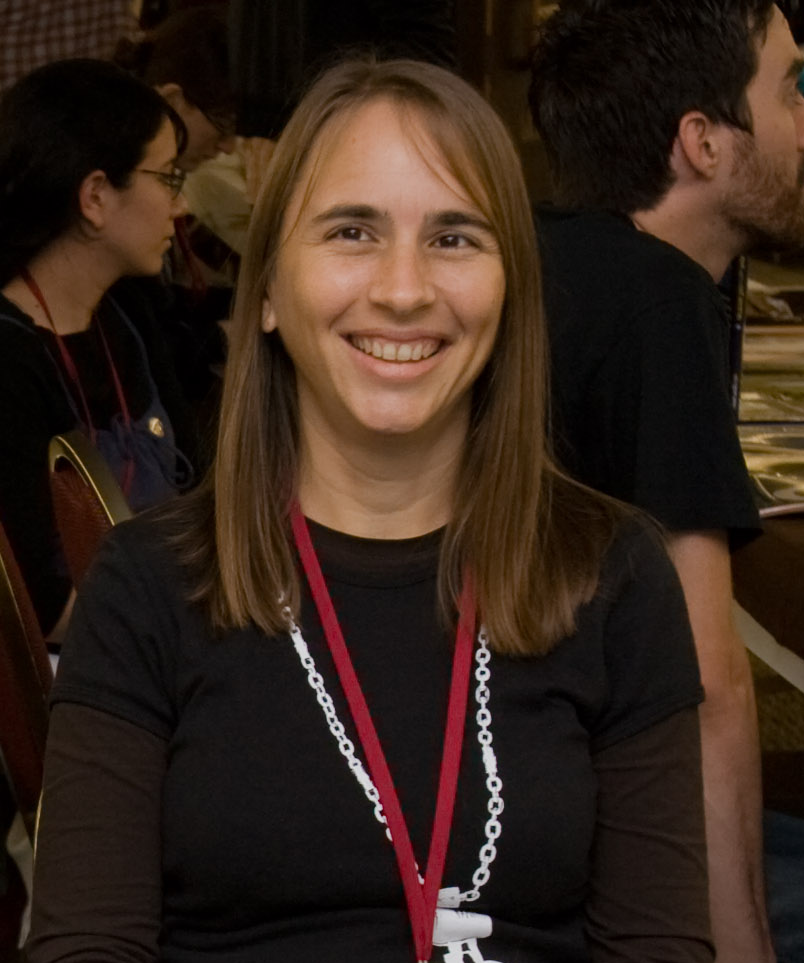
- McMillan in 2007
- Occupation: Cartoonist

Stephanie McMillan (born 1965) is an American political cartoonist, editorialist, and activist from South Florida. A granddaughter of the German commercial animator Hans Fischerkoesen and the sister of Alexander Fischerkoesen, McMillan aspired to become a cartoonist from the age of ten. During her high school years, she began organizing protests against capitalism and imperialism. The Comics Journal describes McMillan's comics and cartoons as being "on the far left" of the American political spectrum, and as being focused on "anti-corporate activism."

== Early life and career ==
McMillan graduated from the Tisch School of the Arts at New York University in 1987 with a BFA in film. During her time at NYU, she studied animation under Richard Protovin and John Canemaker, and received an award for her student film. In 1992, McMillan was offered her first professional cartooning opportunity as an editorial assistant at XS- magazine/City Link, an alt-newsweekly. By 1999, McMillan began self-syndicating her cartoons, as well as providing exclusive comic features and illustrations for hundreds of publications worldwide. Her work has appeared in many publications, including the Los Angeles Times, Daily Beast, South Florida Sun-Sentinel, Yes! Magazine, Comic Relief, Amarillo Globe-News, Funny Times, Yahoo.com, and the San Francisco Bay Guardian.

Beyond her professional cartooning, McMillan has been an organizer against capitalism and imperialism all her life. The groups she has worked with include One Struggle, Refuse and Resist!, the Occupy movement throughout the country, U.S. Hands Off the Haitian People's Coalition, and the Revolutionary Communist Youth Brigade. In 2012, McMillan won the Robert F. Kennedy Journalism Award for Editorial Cartoonists for her work as a political cartoonist.

McMillan’s daily comic strip, Minimum Security, was syndicated online at Universal Uclick’s gocomics.com in the early 2010s. From 2009 to 2011, McMillan also drew Code Green, a weekly editorial cartoon that focused "exclusively on the environmental emergency." McMillan has been an editor and designer for The Notebook (Association of American Editorial Cartoonists), and does freelance illustration and writing. Her own books include Capitalism Must Die! A Basic Introduction: What capitalism is, why it sucks, and how to crush it (INIP—Idées Nouvelles Idées Prolétariennes, 2014), The Beginning of the American Fall (Seven Stories Press, 2012), and As The World Burns: 50 Simple Things You Can Do to Stay in Denial with Derrick Jensen (Seven Stories Press, 2007).

== Books ==
- 2012 — Capitalism Must Die! A Basic Introduction: What capitalism is, why it sucks, and how to crush it (text with comics), INIP (Idées Nouvelles Idées Prolétariennes)
- 2013 — The Minimum Security Chronicles: Resistance to Ecocide (graphic novel), Seven Stories Press
- 2012 — The Beginning of the American Fall (comics journalism about the Occupy protests), Seven Stories Press
- 2012 — The Knitting Circle Rapist Annihilation Squad (novel with Derrick Jensen), PM Press/Flashpoint
- 2010 — Mischief in the Forest: A Yarn Yarn (children’s book with Derrick Jensen), PM Press/Flashpoint
- 2010 — Pendant Que la Planète Flambe (French edition of As the World Burns), La Boîte à Bulles
- 2009 — Excessive Force (anthology), Last Hours, UK
- 2007 — As the World Burns: 50 Simple Things You Can Do to Stay in Denial (graphic novel with Derrick Jensen), Seven Stories Press (Nominated by National Library Association as a Great Graphic Novel for Teens, 2008)
- 2005 —Attitude Presents Minimum Security (cartoon collection), NBM Publishing
- 2002 — Attitude: The New Subversive Cartoonists (anthology), NBM Publishing
- Various textbooks, and several books in the Opposing Viewpoints series by Gale Publishing Group

== Awards ==
- 2012 — Robert F. Kennedy Journalism Award for Editorial Cartoons
- 2011 — Scripps Howard Award for Editorial Cartooning (Finalist)
- 2010 — Sigma Delta Chi Award for editorial cartoons, Society of Professional Journalists
- 2010 — Press Action Cartoonist of the Year
- 2008 — Press Action Dynamic Dozen
- 2005 and 2003 — First Place, Excellence in Postal Union Journalism, APWU National Postal Press Association
- 2000 — Honorable Mention, Creative Resistance Contest, Adbusters
- 1997 and 1994 — First Place, General Excellence in Editorial Cartooning, Florida Press Club
- 1996 — Second Place, General Excellence in Artist Illustration, Florida Press Club
