= Editorial Humor =

1989–2003 newspaper in Massachusetts, US

Editorial Humor was a Massachusetts newspaper that consisted mostly of political cartoons and editorial/opinion pieces. Founded by Dean Wallace, it ran from 1989 to the end of 2003. Editorial Humor claimed a circulation of 50,000, mostly in inner-metro Boston. It was based in Davis Square, Somerville, Massachusetts.

The newspaper was launched in 1989 as The Boston Comic News. In the summer of 1993, the paper hired Robert Deutsch, who had previously worked at both the Boston Phoenix as a writer and ad salesman and the TAB newspapers, based in Newton, MA. In consult with Stavros Cosmopulos of Hill, Holiday, Connors Cosmopulos a decision was made to change the name (and target profile) of the newspaper. Editorial Humor was launched in September 1993 with an editorial cartoon that paid homage to the New Yorker's February Eustice Tilly cover.

The newspaper increased in circulation, and garnered new advertisers such as Sam Adams, Perrier and movie and local radio station advertising. It was itself featured in the Boston Globe for uniting the Governor of Massachusetts William Weld with his favorite cartoonist, Pulitzer Prize–winning Tom Toles.

Robert Deutsch left the newspaper in 1995 and Courtney Wayshak (writing under the pseudonym Clyde Ash) took over as Editor. The following year, Jason Schneiderman took over but soon Dean Wallace as Publisher took the reins again. The former editorial staff was reunited for the commemorative 100th issue in the year 2000. In January 2000, Michael J. O'Brien began work there as an editorial assistant but left in August of that year after being named editor in the spring and helming the ship of fools through numerous "Davis Square map" issues.

By 2002 the newspaper had stopped publishing altogether, due in part to faltering ad sales, the rise of the Internet and a conflict between newspaper publishers who depended on city boxes and city officials who wanted to rid their streets of 'noise' and clutter.

Derek Gerry, a local radio station personality and former editor of the Winchester Town Cryer acquired the paper and brought back Robert Deutsch and John Klossner. With David Deutsch, an advertising design executive, they ran the paper for a year, launching its first web site at edhumor.com and publishing new editions from 2002 until May 2003, when the paper published its last issue.

Robert Deutsch is currently aiming to put all those issues online.
