= Tak Toyoshima =

American cartoonist (born 1971)

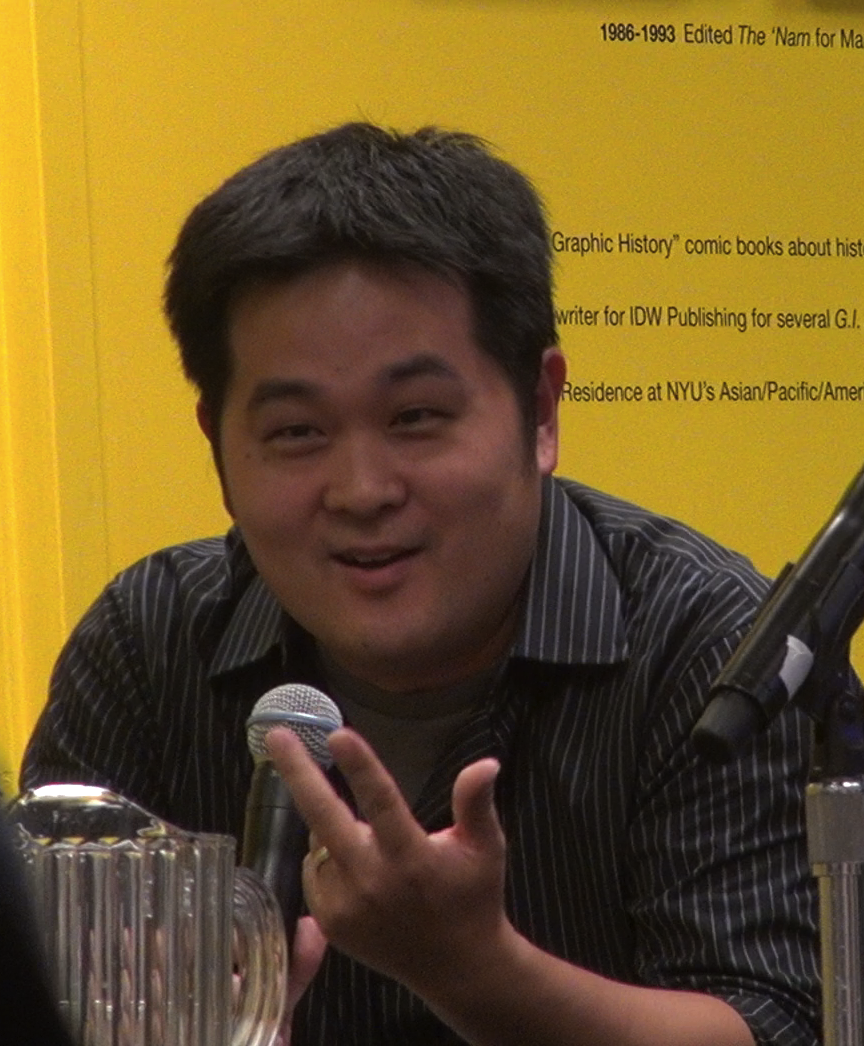
- Born: April 11, 1971 (age 55) New York, New York
- Notable works: Secret Asian Man

Tak Toyoshima (born April 11, 1971, in New York, New York) is an American art director with the Weekly Dig and the author of the comic strip Secret Asian Man.

According to an interview with AArisings, Toyoshima is a second-generation Japanese American born in New York City. He received a degree in advertising from Boston University, and currently resides in Boston.
