= Editorial cartoonist =

Artist drawing editorial cartoons that contain political or social commentary

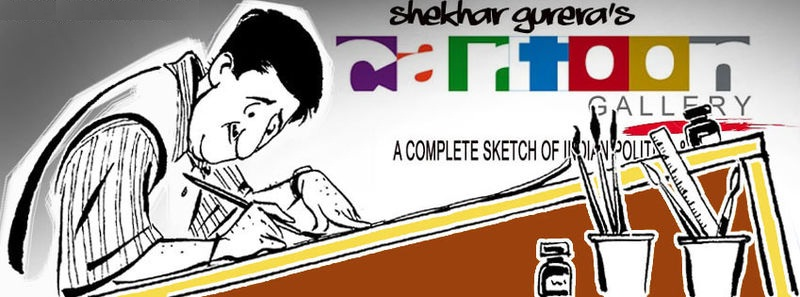
- Self-caricature by an editorial cartoonist

Occupation
- Names: Political cartoonist
- Occupation type: Art profession

Description
- Fields of employment: Journalism
- Related jobs: Cartoonist; Columnist

An editorial cartoonist, also known as a political cartoonist, is an artist who draws editorial cartoons that contain some level of political or social commentary. Their cartoons are used to convey and question an aspect of daily news or current affairs in a national or international context. Political cartoonists generally adopt a caricaturist style of drawing, to capture the likeness of a politician or subject. They may also employ humor or satire to ridicule an individual or group, emphasize their point of view or comment on a particular event.

Because an editorial cartoonist expresses an idea visually, with little or no text or words, it can be understood across many languages and countries. A strong tradition of editorial cartooning can be found throughout the world, in all political environments, including Cuba, Australia, Malaysia, Pakistan, India, Iran, France, Denmark, Canada and the United States.

== Overview ==
The traditional and most common outlet for political cartoonists is the pocket cartoon, which usually appears on the editorial page or the front news page of a newspaper. Editorial cartoons are not usually found in the dedicated comics section, although certain cartoons or comic strips (such as Doonesbury) have achieved crossover status.

In India, the most common and popular form of political commentary is the pocket cartoon. R. K. Laxman, Sudhir Dar, Mario Miranda, E. P. Unny, Shekhar Gurera, Ajit Ninan are some of the popular editorial cartoonists, through their daily pocket cartoons.

Editorial cartoonists may reflect the political opinion expressed on the editorial page, or a newspaper in general, but they can also express opposing views, or opt for more populist humor that often reflects the conventional wisdom of the readers.

Historically, the political cartoon has roots in ancient art forms such as prehistoric cave paintings or the hieroglyphs of Egypt, in terms of their role in informing society. Cartoonists in many ways take on the role of a court jester, who, though employed by a king or other ruler, would often mimic and ridicule him and his regime in his performances, to entertain the court or the common person.

== Media trends ==
Historically, political cartoons were quick, hand-drawn ink drawings, scanned and reproduced in black and white, and published in print newspapers. The introduction of color came later, and more recently the use of digital drawing tools is a popular and efficient way to produce work quickly for newspaper deadlines.

In recent years, the Internet has become a popular means for distributing this kind of short format media, humor, and minority political opinions, leading to a large growth in the popularity of online and alternative editorial cartoons.

The rise of comics journalism online, which combines the longer comic strip format as a means to relay a story in more depth, is very effective in a vertical web format. As visual journalists, comics journalists can tell a story in a visual way, with words and images.

In the United States, there are more than a hundred published editorial cartoonists from both sides of the political divide. Whereas in the past American newspapers generally used to employ staff political cartoonists, nowadays, the work of many political cartoonists, are distributed via syndication services (such as Andrews McMeel Syndication, Cagle Cartoons, the Tribune Content Agency, King Features Syndicate, Creators Syndicate, and Counterpoint Media).

== Risks ==
A political cartoonist's aim is often to encourage debate; they can also fuel controversy. Their work can expose corrupt or abusive regimes, governments or political groups, and therefore often put themselves and their publishers at risk.

In 2005, Danish cartoonist Kurt Westergaard, who participated in the Jyllands-Posten Muhammad cartoons controversy, received numerous death threats and was attacked in his home by a man with an axe.

In 2015, the French satirical magazine Charlie Hebdo's offices were attacked by two Islamist gunmen in reaction to publishing cartoons of Muhammad. Twelve employees were killed, including staff cartoonists Charb, Cabu, Honoré, Tignous and Wolinski.

== Awards ==
The Cartoonists Rights Network International awards the annual Courage in Editorial Cartooning Award to political cartoonists who show bravery and risk their own safety to publish their work. In 2015, this accolade was awarded to Atena Farghadani of Iran, who was jailed for more than 12 years for publishing a cartoon of Iran's parliament with heads of various animals.

There is a Pulitzer Prize awarded every year for America's top editorial cartoonist — as decided by a panel of senior media industry professionals and media academics (see Pulitzer Prize for Illustrated Reporting and Commentary). Other major awards given each year to editorial cartoonists include the Sigma Delta Chi Award from the Society of Professional Journalists, the Thomas Nast Award from the Overseas Press Club, and the Herblock Prize.

== Organizations ==
- Association of American Editorial Cartoonists (AAEC): The largest organization of political cartoonists, have over 300 members worldwide.
- National Cartoonists Society (NCS): welcomes editorial cartoonists in the United States.
- Cartoonists Rights Network International (CRNI): It helps cartoonists who are exiled, jailed or in danger of persecution.
- Indian Institute of Cartoonists (IIC): The only organisation in India dedicated to the art of cartooning and regularly exhibit cartoons of various cartoonists

== Books ==
There are several North American books that have collected together the majority of cartoonists being published at the time. Attack of the Political Cartoonists, written by J. P. Trostle, was published in 2004 and includes profiles of 150 mainstream American and Canadian cartoonists. Attack was an effort to update the 1962 tome Today's Cartoon, by New Orleans States-Item cartoonist John Chase, which included most of the editorial cartoonists working in the U.S. at the height of the Cold War. The 3-volume Attitude series includes some of the political cartoonists who have appeared in alternative newspapers and online — see Attitude: The New Subversive Cartoonists.

There are also a number of North American annual collections published each year, including Best Editorial Cartoons of the Year from Pelican Publishing, Best Political Cartoons of the Year from Daryl Cagle, and Portfolio, which showcases the best Canadian cartoons of the year.

== See also ==
- List of editorial cartoonists
- Indian Institute of Cartoonists
- Center for the Study of Political Graphics
- Animated political cartoons
- Graphics
