= Ted Rall =

American cartoonist, born 1963

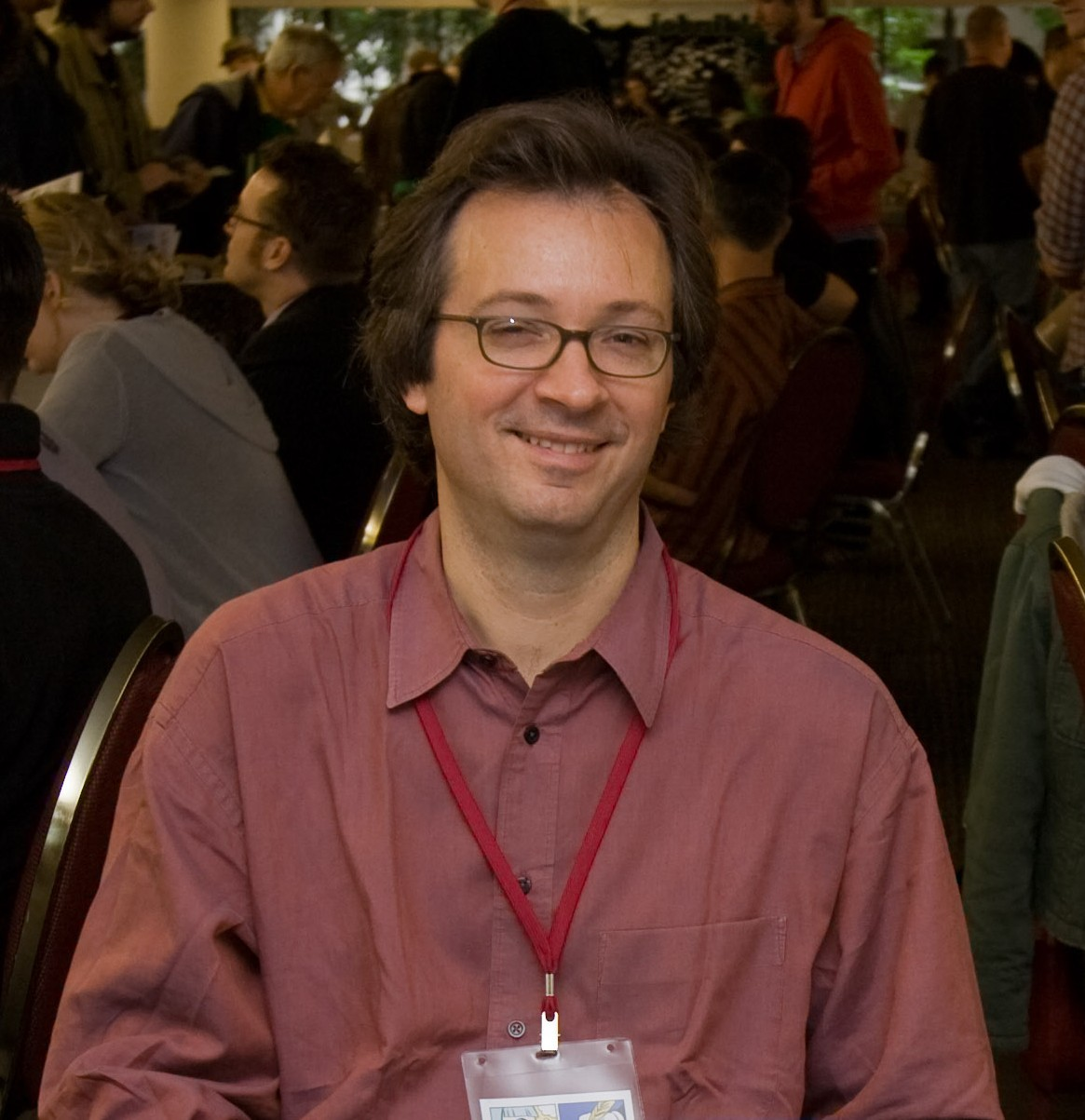
- Ted Rall at Stumptown Comics Festival 2007
- Born: Frederick Theodore Rall III; August 26, 1963 (age 63) Cambridge, Massachusetts, U.S.
- Areas: Artist, writer, editor
- Notable works: Revenge of the Latchkey Kids, To Afghanistan and Back, Silk Road to Ruin, The Anti-American Manifesto
- Awards: 1995 Robert F. Kennedy Journalism Award, 1996 Pulitzer Prize Finalist, 2000 Robert F. Kennedy Journalism Award

Frederick Theodore Rall III (born August 26, 1963) is an American columnist, syndicated editorial cartoonist, and author. His political cartoons often appear in a multi-panel comic-strip format and frequently blend comic-strip and editorial-cartoon conventions. At their peak, Rall's cartoons appeared in approximately 100 newspapers around the United States. He was president of the Association of American Editorial Cartoonists from 2008 to 2009.

Rall draws three editorial cartoons a week for syndication, draws illustrations on a freelance basis, writes a weekly syndicated column, and edits the Attitude series of alternative cartooning anthologies and spin-off collections by up-and-coming cartoonists. He writes and draws cartoons for the news and politics news site founded by journalist Russ Baker, WhoWhatWhy.org,.

He is a graphic novelist and the author of non-fiction books about domestic and international current affairs. He also travels to and writes about Central Asia, a region he believes to be pivotal to U.S. foreign policy concerns. In November 2001 he went to Afghanistan as a war correspondent for The Village Voice and KFI Radio in Los Angeles. He returned to Afghanistan in August 2010, traveling independently, filing daily "cartoon blogs" by satellite.

Rall is the co-host of three news-focused podcasts on YouTube and Rumble: "DeProgram" with Jamarl Thomas, "DMZ America" with Chicago Tribune editorial cartoonist Scott Stantis, and "The TMI Show" with Manila Chan.

== Early life and education ==
Frederick Theodore Rall III was born in Cambridge, Massachusetts, in 1963, and raised in Kettering, Ohio, near Dayton. He graduated from Fairmont West High School, in 1981. From 1981 to 1984, Rall attended Columbia University's engineering school, where he contributed cartoons to the campus newspapers, including the Columbia Daily Spectator, Barnard Bulletin, and the Jester. He failed to complete his studies in the engineering school, where he majored in applied physics and nuclear engineering, but returned to graduate several years later from Columbia's School of General Studies in 1991 with a bachelor of arts, with honors, in history.

== Career ==
Rall says his drawing style was originally influenced by Mike Peters, the editorial cartoonist at his hometown paper, the Dayton Daily News. Later influences included Jules Feiffer, Garry Trudeau, Charles M. Schulz, and Matt Groening.

While living in San Francisco Rall met Dave Eggers, who hired him as a contributing editor and writer for Might magazine, a publication Eggers edited and co-founded. Among other essays, Rall authored two seminal essays for Might, "Confessions of an Investment Banker" and "College is for Suckers". He wrote op-ed columns for The New York Times, including "Why I Will Not Vote" (1994), which justified apathy among Generation Xers who saw neither Democrats nor Republicans responding to their concerns. In 1998 Rall published "Revenge of the Latchkey Kids", a compendium of essays and cartoons that criticized the Baby Boomer-dominated media for ignoring and ridiculing young adults and their achievements.

=== Rebuking of Spiegelman and lawsuit ===
In 1999, Rall wrote an article in The Village Voice accusing Maus creator Art Spiegelman of lacking talent and controlling who gets high-profile assignments from magazines such as The New Yorker through personal connections, including his wife, New Yorker art editor Françoise Mouly. In retaliation for Rall's piece, New York Press illustrator Danny Hellman sent two sets of e-mails under the name "Ted Rall's Balls" to at least 35 cartoonists and editors, including Rall's employers. After Rall tracked down Hellman's identity, Hellman ignored Rall's cease-and-desist letters. After several weeks, Rall filed a $1.5-million lawsuit for libel per se, libel per quod, injurious falsehood, violation of civil rights, and intentional infliction of emotional distress. Rall's suit stated that Hellman was attempting to sabotage his career. Four of Rall's five claims were dismissed, leaving libel per se. The lawsuit remains unresolved.

Rall's cartoons have been handled by San Francisco Chronicle Features, no longer in business, and—since 1996—by Universal Press Syndicate.

Rall's cartoons have appeared regularly in Rolling Stone, Time, Fortune and Men's Health magazines, as well as Mad magazine and The New York Times.

Rall began frequent travels to Central Asia in 1997, when he attempted to drive the Silk Road from Beijing to Istanbul via China, Kazakhstan, Kyrgyzstan, Uzbekistan, and Turkmenistan as a staff writer for P.O.V. magazine. P.O.V. published his adventures as Silk Road to Ruin, a title he used for his 2006 collection of essays and cartoons about Central Asia. Rall returned to the region for POV in 1999 to travel the Karakoram Highway from Kashgar, in western China, to Islamabad. Subsequent trips included two trips in 2000, "Stan Trek 2000"—in which Rall brought along 23 listeners to his radio show for a bus journey from Turkmenistan to Kyrgyzstan via Uzbekistan and Kazakhstan—and a U.S. State Department-sponsored visit to Turkmenistan, where he met with Turkmen college students and dissidents to explain the nature of free press in a democracy. A 2002 assignment for Gear magazine to cover the world championships of buzkashi in Tajikistan was not published due to the magazine's going out of business, but turned up in an edited form in Silk Road to Ruin. He returned to Tajikistan, Xinjiang Province in western China and Pakistan during the summer of 2007.

The Attitude: The New Subversive Cartoonists series of books is a series of anthologies of alternative comics edited by Rall. Frustrated that cartoons prevalent in alternative weekly newspapers were being ignored in favor of mainstream and art comics, Rall edited the first "Attitude" anthology, Attitude: The New Subversive Political Cartoonists, in 2002, with its mission to bring together cartoonists who were "too alternative for the mainstream and too mainstream for the alternative." Attitude 2: The New Subversive Alternative Cartoonists followed in 2004, and in 2006 Attitude 3: The New Subversive Online Cartoonists appeared. Each volume contains interviews with, cartoons by and personal ephemera related to 21 different cartoon creators. The first and second volumes emphasized political and humor cartoons; the third volume exclusively features web cartoonists.

Rall also edited three cartoons collections by Andy Singer, Neil Swaab, and Stephanie McMillan under the name "Attitude Presents:".

In 2005, Rall was listed at #15 in Bernard Goldberg's book 100 People Who Are Screwing Up America as a "vicious, conspiracy-minded, hate-filled jerk". Rall perceived the listing as an honor, replying, "Not only am I grouped with many people whom I admire for their achievements and patriotism, I'm being demonized by McCarthyite thugs I despise."

From 2006 to 2009, Rall was editor of Acquisitions and Development at the comic strip syndicate United Media. While there, he helped bring to syndication Keith Knight's The Knight Life, Signe Wilkinson's Family Tree, Tak Toyoshima's Secret Asian Man, Dan Thompson's Rip Haywire, and Richard Stevens' Diesel Sweeties.

=== Pat Tillman's death cartoon ===
Rall released a cartoon on May 3, 2004, following the death of Pat Tillman (a former Arizona Cardinals player who abandoned his NFL career to enlist in the United States Army Rangers and was killed in Afghanistan), depicting him asking an Army recruiter, "Never mind the fine print. Will I get to kill Arabs?" The narrator points out that he was killed and the reader is then given a choice: "idiot", "sap", or "hero".

This strip sparked massive public outrage for portraying Tillman, and other veterans, as idiotic and enlisting to kill people. In the aftermath of the publication he was sent multiple death threats and was laid off from MSNBC. Rall defended his style, arguing that political cartoonists are meant to challenge widely accepted heroic narratives and provoke uncomfortable national discussions rather than conform to mainstream sentiment.

Later, after Tillman's anti–Iraq War sentiments and the friendly fire circumstances of his death became public, Rall wrote that he regretted making such sweeping assumptions about Tillman's motives, describing Tillman as "one hell of an interesting human being".

=== 2004 election disability analogy ===
A November 8, 2004, cartoon depicted mentally disabled children as classroom teachers in an attempt to make an analogy to American voters who reelected President George W. Bush, drawing complaints from disability rights advocates and led to his cartoons being dropped from The Washington Post's website. Rall responded in his blog saying: "I regret hurting people who I have nothing against. I do want to comfort the afflicted and afflict the comfortable, and I think I failed in that with this cartoon. Not to mention that the cartoon failed—too many people got bogged down in the analogy and the main point got lost."

=== Anti-veteran sentiments ===
On October 22, 2007, Rall published a cartoon saying "Over time, however, the endless war in Iraq began to play a role in natural selection. Only idiots signed up; only idiots died. Back home, the average I.Q. soared." That caused an uproar by military supporters both conservative and liberal alike.

=== Coulter Lawsuit ===
Rall solicited funds from readers and left-wing bloggers while considering whether to sue Ann Coulter for libel and slander for her (later self-described as "joking") statement that, "Iran is soliciting cartoons on the Holocaust. So far, only Ted Rall, Garry Trudeau, and The New York Times have made submissions." Coulter first made the remark at the 2006 Conservative Political Action Conference meeting in Washington, D.C., on February 10 and then printed it in her syndicated column the following week. By 18 days later, pledges totaled over $21,000. However, pledges are no longer being solicited, and in a December 27, 2006 blog entry, Rall posted an email that was sent to pledged contributors to the lawsuit, stating that his attorneys had determined, "The road ahead is too uncertain to justify spending thousands of dollars of pledges, not to mention my own money".

Rall's work includes the book The Anti-American Manifesto (Seven Stories Press), published in September 2010. His book, The Book of Obama: From Hope and Change to the Age of Revolt (Seven Stories Press) was released in July 2012.

=== Dismissal from the Los Angeles Times ===
In July 2015, the Los Angeles Times released a "note to readers" stating that Rall had been dropped from the paper because of allegations that he had recently lied about a 2001 encounter with the police. The Los Angeles Police Department (LAPD) claimed that Rall misrepresented the encounter in a May 2015 opinion blog post he wrote about enforcement of jaywalking laws in Los Angeles.

LAPD Chief Charlie Beck, whom Rall had repeatedly mocked in his cartoons for the LA Times, provided a copy of an audio recording of the encounter that the LA Times found to "raise serious questions about the accuracy of Rall's blog post". Rall stood by his version of the incident. Another version of the recording, which Rall posted online after having it restored by sound engineers, included sounds of bystanders talking. One person is heard saying "you need to take off the handcuffs."

The Association of American Editorial Cartoonists issued a statement calling for an independent investigation of the tape. On August 19, the LA Times issued a lengthy statement reaffirming its claim that Rall's original blog post "did not meet its standards". In it, they reported they had the audio recording investigated by two audio and video forensics experts and it still did not support Rall's version of the event.

==== Lawsuit against the Los Angeles Times ====
In March 2016, Rall filed suit against the Los Angeles Times for defamation of character and wrongful termination; in June 2017, the judge in the case dismissed claims against four individuals for defamation and intentional infliction of emotional distress; claims against the former and current LA Times corporate ownership remain. Rall appealed the lower-court dismissal to the California Court of Appeals. On January 17, 2019, the Court of Appeals published an opinion affirming the dismissal. However, in April 2019 the California Supreme Court accepted Rall's petition for review, which continues the case's appeal process. In September 2019, the California Supreme Court returned the case to the California Court of Appeals for review in light of its decision in Wilson v. Cable News Network, Inc. (2019) 7 Cal. 5th 871 (Wilson). On December 18, 2019, the California Court of Appeals again affirmed the trial court's orders dismissing Rall's claims.

=== Other media ===
Rall was a regular guest on Hannity & Colmes, as well as NPR. He contributes a cartoon called "Left Coast" to the Pasadena Weekly. In February 2005, BBC television broadcast a 30-minute profile of Rall as part of their series Cartoonists on the Front Line.

Rall maintains a blog at his website. Rall released a series of animated political cartoons on his website and on YouTube in collaboration with David Essman.

Rall had a Saturday and Sunday radio talk show on KFI radio in Los Angeles from August 1998 to August 2000. After 9/11, KFI brought him back to travel to Afghanistan and file live on-air reports from the battle of Kunduz and elsewhere in northern Afghanistan. Rall's show was also broadcast live from Havana as well as Pakistani-held Kashmir. In 2005 he had a weekend show on San Francisco's KIFR-FM. Rall has been a frequent guest on National Public Radio, the BBC and Fox Radio.

Rall has previously described himself as a guest on the Russian state-owned radio programmer Sputnik, and criticized the Biden administration’s sanctions shutting down Sputnik’s local affiliate in the United States.

Rall also wrote and drew cartoons for Sputnik International, a news website platform established by the Russian government-owned news agency Rossiya Segodnya (Россия Сегодня—Russia Today).

== Personal life ==
=== Political views ===
A panel from a Ted Rall cartoon satirizing Antonin Scalia's remark that he saw nothing wrong with "slapping" terrorism suspects.

In 2009 Rall called for Barack Obama to resign as President of the United States, because "the gap between the soaring expectations that accompanied Barack Obama's inauguration and his wretched performance is the broadest such chasm in recent historical memory. This guy makes Bill Clinton look like a paragon of integrity and follow-through." He endorsed Jill Stein in the 2016 presidential election.

In December 2016, Rall presented what he called a "manifesto" to "topple Trumpism." Less than a year and a half later, however, he predicted "that Mr. Trump would not only finish his term but win re-election, due to the divisions within the Democratic Party."

=== Religious views ===
Rall is an atheist and writes some cartoons dealing with these views.

== Awards and recognition ==
- 1995: Robert F. Kennedy Journalism Award
- 1996: Finalist, Pulitzer Prize
- 1997: Firecracker Alternative Book Award (Graphic Novel), for Real Americans Admit: The Worst Thing I've Ever Done!
- 1997: First Prize, Deadline Club Award, Society of Professional Journalists
- 2000: Robert F. Kennedy Journalism Award
- 2001: Amazon's Best Books of the Year, for 2024: A Graphic Novel
- 2002: Best Book of the Year, American Library Association, for To Afghanistan and Bac
- 2002: James Aronson Award for Social Justice Graphics
- 2007: Second Prize, Association of Alternative Newsweeklies Awards
- 2007: Second Prize, Lambda Legal's "Life Without Fair Courts" cartoon contest
- 2008: Ohioana Citation for Art and Journalism
- 2010: Scripps Howard National Journalism Award, Finalist
- 2011: First Prize, Association of Alternative Newsweeklies Awards

== Works ==
=== Cartoon collections ===
- Waking Up In America (St. Martin's Press, 1992), ISBN 0-312-08518-4
- All The Rules Have Changed (Rip Off Press, 1995), ISBN 0-89620-119-8
- Search and Destroy (Andrews McMeel 2001), ISBN 0-7407-1396-5
- America Gone Wild (Andrews McMeel, 2006), ISBN 0-7407-6045-9

=== Graphic novels ===
- Real Americans Admit: The Worst Thing I've Ever Done! (NBM Publishing, 1996), ISBN 1-56163-157-4
- My War With Brian (NBM, 1998), ISBN 1-56163-215-5
- 2024: A Graphic Novel (NBM, 2001), ISBN 1-56163-290-2
- The Year of Loving Dangerously (NBM, 2009), artwork by Pablo G. Callejo, ISBN 1-56163-565-0
- After We Kill You, We Will Welcome You Back as Honored Guests (Hill and Wang, 2014) ISBN 0-8090-2340-7
- The Stringer (NBM, 2021) ISBN 978-1-6811-2272-4

=== Non-fiction ===
- Revenge of the Latchkey Kids: An Illustrated Guide to Surviving the '90s and Beyond (Workman, 1998), essays and cartoons, ISBN 0-7611-0745-2
- Gas War: The Truth Behind the American Occupation of Afghanistan (NBM, 2002), prose non-fiction, ISBN 0-7407-1396-5
- To Afghanistan and Back (NBM, 2002), graphic travelogue, ISBN 1-56163-325-9
- Wake Up, You're Liberal!: How We Can Take America Back from the Right (Soft Skull Press, 2004), prose non-fiction, ISBN 1-932360-22-0
- Generalissimo El Busho: Essays and Cartoons on the Bush Years (NBM, 2004), essays and cartoons, ISBN 1-56163-384-4
- Silk Road to Ruin: Is Central Asia the New Middle East? (NBM, 2006), graphic novellas and essays, ISBN 1-56163-454-9
- The Anti-American Manifesto (Seven Stories Press, 2010), political polemic, ISBN 1-58322-933-7
- The Book of Obama: How We Went From Hope and Change to the Age of Revolt (Seven Stories Press, 2012), essays and cartoons, ISBN 978-1-60980-450-3
- Snowden (Seven Stories Press, 2015), prose non-fiction, ISBN 1-60980-635-2
- Bernie (Seven Stories Press, 2016), prose non-fiction, ISBN 1-60980-698-0
- Trump: A Graphic Biography (Seven Stories Press, 2016), prose non-fiction, ISBN 1-60980-758-8
- Meet the Deplorables: Infiltrating Trump America (39 West Press, 2017), essays and cartoons, with Harmon Leon, ISBN 978-1-946358-09-7
- Francis, the People's Pope (Seven Stories Press, 2018), prose non-fiction, ISBN 9781609807603
- Bernie: Updated 2020 Edition (Seven Stories Press, 2020), prose non-fiction, ISBN 9781644210321
- Political Suicide: The Fight for the Soul of the Democratic Party (Seven Stories Press, 2020), prose non-fiction, ISBN 9781609809942
- What's Left: Radical Solutions for Radical Problems (Adjy Publishing, 2025), prose non-fiction, ISBN 979-8998662201

=== Attitude: The New Subversive Cartoonists anthologies ===
- Attitude: The New Subversive Political Cartoonists (NBM, 2002), ISBN 1-56163-317-8
- Attitude 2: The New Subversive Alternative Cartoonists (NBM, 2004), ISBN 1-56163-381-X
- Attitude 3: The New Subversive Online Cartoonists (NBM, 2006), ISBN 1-56163-465-4

=== Other ===
- Shiny Adidas Track Suits and the Death of Camp (1998), contains essays from Might magazine, ISBN 0-425-16477-2
- 9-11: Emergency Relief (2001) 9/11 benefit anthology; contributor, ISBN 1-891867-12-1
- Working For the Man (2003) William Messner-Loebs benefit anthology; contributor
- Masters of War: Militarism and Blowback in the Era of American Empire (2003), cartoon foreword, ISBN 0-415-94499-6
- Talk to Her: Interviews with Kristine McKenna (2004), illustration of Joe Stummer, ISBN 1-56097-570-9
- Killed: Great Journalism Too Hot to Print (2004), edited by David Wallis, contains "Money Changes Everything" essay, ISBN 1-56025-581-1
- The Disposable Male: Sex, Love, and Money (2006), by Michael Gilbert, includes cartoon, ISBN 0-9776552-3-7
- Killed Cartoons: Casualties from the War on Free Expression (2007), edited by David Wallis, contains "Ronald Reagan airport" and "Gulf War Beach" cartoons, ISBN 0-393-32924-0
- Billionaires & Ballot Bandits: How to Steal an Election in 9 Easy Steps (2012), by Greg Palast, contains 48-page comic insert "Tales From The Crypt of Democracy", ISBN 1-609-80478-3

== See also ==
- Matt Bors – another cartoonist who has collaborated with Rall
- List of newspaper columnists
