= Korean War National Museum =

Coordinates: 39°48′3.4″N 89°38′58.4″W

The Korean War National Museum (KWNM) was a private-sector non-profit Illinois-based corporation headquartered in Springfield, Illinois. The KWNM sought to create a museum and educational program to help people understand American participation in the Korean War (1950-1953), especially from the point of view of the men and women who served in combat and support roles. Founded in 1997, the KWNM reorganized in 2010 with the goal of expanding itself and building an accredited museum facility in New York City.

A 10,000 square foot KWNM facility, the Denis J. Healy Freedom Center, operated from 2009 until 2017 in Springfield, Illinois. The troops of 23 nations, including the United States of America, South Korea, and 21 other nations that fought under the flag of the United Nations, were honored in the Illinois storefront facility. In 1950-1953, an estimated 6 million U.S. men and women served in the armed forces, although not all of them were actually stationed in Korea.

The Korean War National Museum abruptly closed in August 2017. It was announced in March 2018 that artifacts formerly displayed in the museum had been transferred to the Harry S. Truman Presidential Library and Museum in Independence, Missouri, and the museum's former website, "Korean War National Museum," was deactivated.

== See also ==
- Korean War Veterans Memorial in Washington, D.C.
