= Silver Reuben Award =

Annual award for cartoonists since 1956

The Silver Reuben Award (/ˈruːbən/) is an award for cartoonists organized by the National Cartoonists Society. Until 2015, the awards was known as the National Cartoonists Society Division Awards.

== Current categories ==
=== Advertising Illustration Award ===
From its inception until 1975 this award was known as the Advertising and Illustration award. The following year, it divided into two separate categories, Advertising and Illustration, combining again from 1982 to 1985. They divided again in 1986. This category was titled Commercial in 1989 and 1990.

- 1956 Harry Devlin
- 1957 Russell Patterson
- 1958 Carl Rose
- 1959 Ronald Searle
- 1960 Noel Sickles
- 1961 Eric Gurney
- 1962 Harry Devlin and Noel Sickles (tie)
- 1963 Harry Devlin
- 1964 Dick Hodgins, Jr.
- 1965 Ronald Searle
- 1966 Dick Hodgins, Jr.
- 1967 Roy Doty
- 1968 Dave Pascal
- 1969 Ronald Michaud
- 1970 Roy Doty
- 1971 Eric Gurney
- 1972 Irwin Caplan
- 1973 Al Jaffee
- 1974 Bill Kresse
- 1975 Burne Hogarth
- 1976 Mike Berry
- 1977 Charles Saxon
- 1978 Roy Doty
- 1979 Mischa Richter
- 1980 Jack Davis
- 1981 Irwin Caplan
- 1982 Arnold Roth
- 1983 Ronald Michaud
- 1984 Arnold Roth
- 1985 Arnold Roth
- 1986 Ronald Searle
- 1987 Ronald Searle
- 1988 Bob Bindig
- 1989 Roy Doty
- 1990 Steve Duquette
- 1991 W. B. Park
- 1992 Daryl Cagle
- 1993 Edward Sorel
- 1994 Jerry Buckley
- 1995 Jack Pittman
- 1996 Roy Doty
- 1997 B. B. Sams
- 1998 Jack Pittman
- 1999 Craig McKay
- 2000 Craig McKay (Cincinnati Chamber of Commerce posters)
- 2001 Pat Byrnes
- 2002 Jim Hummel
- 2003 Tom Richmond
- 2004 Mike Lester
- 2005 Roy Doty
- 2006 Tom Richmond
- 2007 Tom Richmond
- 2008 Craig McKay
- 2009 Steve Brodner
- 2010 Dave Whamond
- 2011 Nick Galifianakis
- 2012 Ed Steckley
- 2013 Rich Powell
- 2014 Ed Steckley
- 2015 Anton Emdin
- 2016 Luke McGarry
- 2017 Dave Whamond
- 2018 James E. Lyle
- 2019 Luke McGarry
- 2020 Luke McGarry
- 2021 Johnny Sampson
- 2022 Dave Whamond
- 2023 Chuck Dillon

=== Animation Award ===
In 1989 and 1990, the category was titled Electronic Media. In 1995, it was divided into Feature Animation and Television Animation. The Online Animation Award category was introduced starting with the 2018 awards, but it didn't give out its first award until the following year.

- 1957 Walt Disney
- 1958 Paul Terry
- 1960 Bill Hanna & Joe Barbera
- 1961 Walt Disney
- 1963 Walt Disney
- 1972 Bill Melendez
- 1973 Johnny Hart
- 1974 Jim Logan
- 1975 Isadore Klein
- 1976 Howard Beckerman
- 1977 Sergio Aragonés
- 1978 Ralph Bakshi
- 1979 Hilda Terry
- 1980 Selby Kelly
- 1981 Selby Kelly
- 1982 Bill Melendez
- 1983 Howard Beckerman
- 1984 Nancy Beiman
- 1985 Chuck Jones
- 1986 Chuck Jones
- 1987 Chuck Jones
- 1988 Bill Melendez
- 1989 Chuck Jones
- 1990 Chuck Jones
- 1991 Glen Keane (Beauty and the Beast)
- 1992 Eric Goldberg (Aladdin)
- 1993 Tim Burton (The Nightmare Before Christmas)
- 1994 David Silverman (The Simpsons)

==== Feature Animation Award ====
- 1995 Joe Grant (Pocahontas)
- 1996 Mark Miller & crew
- 1997 Nik Ranieri (Hercules)
- 1998 Chen Yi Chang (Mulan)
- 1999 Brad Bird (The Iron Giant)
- 2000 Eric Goldberg (Fantasia 2000: "Rhapsody in Blue")
- 2001 Pete Docter (Monsters, Inc.)
- 2002 Chris Sanders (Lilo & Stitch)
- 2003 Andrew Stanton (Finding Nemo)
- 2004 Brad Bird (The Incredibles)
- 2005 Nick Park (Wallace & Gromit: The Curse of the Were-Rabbit)
- 2006 Carter Goodrich (Open Season)
- 2007 David Silverman (The Simpsons Movie)
- 2008 Nicolas Marlet (Kung Fu Panda)
- 2009 Ronnie del Carmen (Up)
- 2010 Nicolas Marlet (How to Train Your Dragon)
- 2011 Mark McCreery (Rango)
- 2012 Joann Sfar (The Rabbi's Cat)
- 2013 Hayao Miyazaki (The Wind Rises)
- 2014 Tomm Moore (Song Of The Sea)
- 2015 Steve Martino (The Peanuts Movie)
- 2016 Cory Loftis (Zootopia)
- 2017 Lee Unkrich & Adrian Molina (Coco)
- 2018 Justin K. Thompson (Spider-Man: Into the Spider-Verse)
- 2019 Nelson Lowry, Santiago Montiel & Trevor Dalmer (Missing Link)
- 2020 Maria Pareja (Wolfwalkers)

==== Television Animation Award ====
- 1995 Bruce Timm (Batman: The Animated Series)
- 1996 Everett Peck (Duckman)
- 1997 David Feiss (Cow and Chicken)
- 1998 Danny Antonucci (Cartoon Sushi)
- 1999 Rich Moore (Futurama)
- 1999 Danny Antonucci (Ed, Edd n Eddy)
- 2000 Gary Baseman (Teacher's Pet)
- 2001 Chris Reccardi & Lynne Naylor (Samurai Jack)
- 2002 Stephen Hillenburg (SpongeBob SquarePants)
- 2003 Paul Rudish (The Powerpuff Girls, Samurai Jack, and Star Wars: Clone Wars)
- 2004 Craig McCracken (Foster's Home for Imaginary Friends)
- 2005 David Silverman (The Simpsons)
- 2006 Craig McCracken (Foster's Home for Imaginary Friends)
- 2007 Stephen Silver (Kim Possible)
- 2008 Jorge R. Gutierrez & Sandra Equihua (El Tigre: The Adventures of Manny Rivera)
- 2009 Seth MacFarlane (Family Guy)
- 2010 Dave Filoni (Star Wars: The Clone Wars)
- 2011 Erik Wiese (The Mighty B!)
- 2012 Rich Webber (DC Nation) Aardman Animation Studios
- 2013 Paul Rudish (Mickey Mouse)
- 2014 Patrick McHale (Over the Garden Wall)
- 2015 Drew Hodges (Tumble Leaf)
- 2016 Chris Savino (The Loud House)
- 2017 Alan Bodner (Tangled: The Series)
- 2018 Chris Mitchell & Keiko Murayama (The Adventures of Rocky and Bullwinkle)
- 2019 Genndy Tartakovsky (Primal)
- 2020 Genndy Tartakovsky (Primal)

==== Online Animation Award ====
- 2019 Joe Bluhm (Pinocchio – A Modern Retelling)
- 2020 Sammy Moore & Even Stenhouse (Brawl Stars: Barley's Bar and Piper's Sugar and Spice)

Art for Animated Media

- 2021 Lindsey Olivares

=== Book Illustration Award ===
- 1999 T. Lewis
- 2000 Mike Lester (A Is for Salad)
- 2001 Frank Cho
- 2002 B. B. Sams
- 2003 Chris Payne
- 2004 Geefwee Boedoe
- 2005 Ralph Steadman
- 2006 Mike Lester
- 2007 Sandra Boynton
- 2008 Mike Lester
- 2009 Dave Whamond
- 2010 Mike Lester (The ***Book)
- 2011 John Rocco (Blackout)
- 2012 John Manders
- 2013 William Joyce
- 2014 Marla Frazee
- 2015 Sydney Smith
- 2016 Dave Whamond
- 2017 Adam Rex (The Legend of Rock Paper Scissors)
- 2018 Rafael Lopez
- 2019 Stacy Curtis (Karate Kakapo)
- 2020 Janee Trasler (Frog Meets Dog, Goat in a Boat, Hog on a Log)
- 2021 Stacy Curtis (Penguin and Moose Brave the Night)
- 2022 Ed Steckley
- 2023 Tom Richmond (Claptrap)

=== Comic Books Award ===
In 1970, the Comic Books Award was divided into Humor Comic Books and Story Comic Books. They were merged back together in 1982. In 1989 and 1990, the Comic Books award was merged with the Magazine and Book Illustration Award. It was separated back into its own award in 1991. A separate award for Graphic Novels was created in 2009.

- 1956 Jerry Robinson
- 1957 Wallace Wood
- 1958 Carmine Infantino and Steve Douglas (tie)
- 1959 Wallace Wood
- 1960 Bob Oksner
- 1961 Bob Oksner
- 1962 Bob Gustafson
- 1963 Frank Thorne
- 1964 Paul Fung Jr.
- 1965 Wallace Wood
- 1966 Al Williamson
- 1967 Will Eisner
- 1968 Will Eisner
- 1969 Will Eisner
- 1970 Henry Boltinoff (Humor) and Tom Gill (Story)
- 1971 Bob Gustafson (Humor) and Gil Kane (Story)
- 1972 Bob Gustafson (Humor) and Gil Kane (Story)
- 1973 Sergio Aragonés (Humor) and Frank Springer (Story)
- 1974 Sergio Aragonés (Humor) and Joe Kubert (Story)
- 1975 Hy Eisman (Humor) and Gil Kane (Story)
- 1976 Sergio Aragonés (Humor) and Tex Blaisdell (Story)
- 1977 David Pascall (Humor) and Frank Springer (Story)
- 1978 Frank Johnson (Humor) and Alden McWilliams (Story)
- 1979 Al Jaffee (Humor) and Will Eisner (Story)
- 1980 Paul Fung, Jr. (Humor) and Joe Kubert (Story)
- 1981 George Wildman (Humor) and Frank Springer (Story)
- 1982 Bob Gustafson
- 1983 Hy Eisman
- 1984 Kurt Schaffenberger
- 1985 Dick Ayers
- 1986 Sergio Aragonés
- 1987 Will Eisner
- 1988 Will Eisner
- 1989 N/A. See Magazine and Book Illustration Award.
- 1990 N/A. See Magazine and Book Illustration Award
- 1991 Frank Miller
- 1992 Todd McFarlane
- 1993 Mark Chiarello
- 1994 Dan Jurgens
- 1995 Jeff Smith (Bone)
- 1996 Jeff Smith
- 1997 Don Perlin
- 1998 Alex Ross (Superman: Peace on Earth)
- 1999 Chris Ware (Acme Novelty Library)
- 2000 Dan DeCarlo (Betty and Veronica)
- 2001 Frank Cho (Liberty Meadows)
- 2002 Stan Sakai (Usagi Yojimbo (Dark Horse Comics))
- 2003 Terry Moore
- 2004 Darwyn Cooke (DC: The New Frontier)
- 2005 Paul Chadwick (Concrete: The Human Dilemma)
- 2006 Gene Luen Yang
- 2007 Shaun Tan (The Arrival)
- 2008 Cyril Pedrosa
- 2009 Paul Pope
- 2010 Jill Thompson (Beasts of Burden)
- 2011 J. H. Williams III (Batwoman)
- 2012 Bernie Wrightson (Frankenstein Alive, Alive!)
- 2013 Sergio Aragonés
- 2014 Jason Latour (Southern Bastards)
- 2015 Ben Caldwell
- 2016 Max Sarin and Liz Fleming (Giant Days)
- 2017 Sana Takeda (Monstress Vol. 2 The Blood)
- 2018 Greg Smallwood
- 2019 Stan Sakai (Usagi Yojimbo)
- 2020 Walt Simonson (Ragnarok: The Breaking of Helheim)
- 2021 David Peterson (Mouse Guard)
- 2022 Ben Bender
- 2023 Jay Stephens (Dwellings)

=== Editorial Cartoons Award ===
- 1956 Bill Crawford (Newark News)
- 1957 Bill Crawford (Newark News) and Herbert Block (Washington Post) (tie)
- 1958 Bill Crawford (Newark News)
- 1959 Bill Mauldin (St Louis Post-Dispatch)
- 1960 Herbert Block (Washington Post)
- 1961 Karl Hubenthal (Los Angeles Examiner)
- 1962 John Fischetti (New York Herald Tribune)
- 1963 John Fischetti (New York Herald Tribune)
- 1964 John Fischetti (New York Herald Tribune)
- 1965 John Fischetti (New York Herald Tribune)
- 1966 Bill Crawford (Syndicated)
- 1967 Karl Hubenthal (Los Angeles Herald-Examiner)
- 1968 Warren King (New York Daily News)
- 1969 Blaine (Hamilton Spectator)
- 1970 Karl Hubenthal (Los Angeles Herald-Examiner)
- 1971 Pat Oliphant (Denver Post)
- 1972 Dick Hodgins, Jr.
- 1973 Pat Oliphant (Denver Post)
- 1974 Pat Oliphant (Denver Post)
- 1975 John Pierotti (New York Post)
- 1976 Dick Hodgins, Jr.
- 1977 Jeff MacNelly (Richmond News Leader)
- 1978 Paul Szep (Boston Globe)
- 1979 Frank Evers (New York Daily News)
- 1980 Larry Wright (Detroit News)
- 1981 Etta Hulme (Fort Worth Star Telegram)
- 1982 Mike Peters (Dayton Daily News)
- 1983 Mike Peters (Dayton Daily News)
- 1984 Pat Oliphant (Syndicated) and Larry Wright (Detroit News) (tie)
- 1985 Don Wright (Miami News)
- 1986 Jim Borgman (Cincinnati Enquirer)
- 1987 Jim Borgman (Cincinnati Enquirer)
- 1988 Jim Borgman (Cincinnati Enquirer)
- 1989 Pat Oliphant (Syndicated)
- 1990 Pat Oliphant (Syndicated)
- 1991 Pat Oliphant (Syndicated)
- 1992 Jim Morin (Miami Herald)
- 1993 Bill Schorr (Syndicated)
- 1994 Jim Borgman (Cincinnati Enquirer)
- 1995 Chip Bok (Akron Beacon Journal)
- 1996 Bill Day (Syndicated)
- 1997 Glenn McCoy (Belleville News-Democrat)
- 1998 Etta Hulme (Fort Worth Star Telegram)
- 1999 Chip Bok (Akron Beacon Journal)
- 2000 Jerry Holbert (Boston Herald)
- 2001 Mike Luckovich (Atlanta Journal-Constitution)
- 2002 Clay Bennett (Christian Science Monitor)
- 2003 Tom Toles (Washington Post)
- 2004 Jeff Parker (Florida Today)
- 2005 Jim Borgman (Cincinnati Enquirer)
- 2006 Michael Ramirez (Investor's Business Daily)
- 2007 Bill Schorr
- 2008 Michael Ramirez
- 2009 John Sherffius (Syndicated)
- 2010 Gary Varvel
- 2011 Michael Ramirez
- 2012 Jen Sorensen
- 2013 Michael Ramirez
- 2014 Michael Ramirez
- 2015 Ann Telnaes
- 2016 Mike Luckovich (Atlanta Journal-Constitution)
- 2017 Clay Bennett
- 2018 Rob Rogers
- 2019 Pat Bagley
- 2020 Bruce MacKinnon
- 2021 Ruben Bolling
- 2022 Matt Davies
- 2023 Michael de Adder

=== Gag Cartoons Award ===
- 1956 Chon Day
- 1957 John Gallagher
- 1958 Eldon Dedini
- 1959 Vahan Shirvanian
- 1961 Eldon Dedini
- 1962 Chon Day
- 1963 Jack Tippit
- 1964 Eldon Dedini
- 1965 Orlando Busino
- 1966 Jack Tippit
- 1967 Orlando Busino
- 1968 Orlando Busino
- 1969 George Wolfe
- 1970 Chon Day
- 1971 John Gallagher
- 1972 Don Orehek
- 1973 George Wolfe
- 1974 Mischa Richter
- 1975 George Wolfe
- 1976 George Wolfe
- 1977 Bill Hoest
- 1978 Henry Martin
- 1979 Jack Markow
- 1980 Charles Saxon
- 1981 Bo Brown
- 1982 Don Orehek
- 1983 Sergio Aragones
- 1984 Don Orehek
- 1985 Don Orehek
- 1986 Charles Saxon
- 1987 Charles Saxon
- 1988 Eldon Dedini
- 1991 Arnie Levin
- 1992 Arnie Levin
- 1993 George Booth
- 1994 John Reiner
- 1995 Lee Lorenz
- 1996 Glenn McCoy
- 1997 Mark Tonra
- 1998 Charles Barsotti
- 1999 Rick Stromoski
- 2000 Kim Warp
- 2001 Jerry King
- 2002 Glenn McCoy
- 2003 Glenn McCoy
- 2004 Robert Weber
- 2005 Glenn McCoy
- 2006 Drew Dernavitch
- 2007 Mort Gerberg
- 2008 Mort Gerberg
- 2009 Glenn McCoy
- 2010 Gary McCoy
- 2011 Zach Kanin
- 2012 Roz Chast
- 2013 Matt Diffee
- 2014 Liza Donnelly
- 2015 David Sipress
- 2016 Will McPhail
- 2017 Pat Byrnes
- 2018 Joe Dator
- 2019 Amy Hwang
- 2020 Ellis Rosen
- 2021 Christopher Weyant
- 2022 Ben Bender
- 2023 Dan Misdea

=== Graphic Novels Award ===
- 2009 David Mazzucchelli (Asterios Polyp)
- 2010 Joyce Farmer (Special Exits)
- 2011 Ben Katchor (The Cardboard Valise)
- 2012 Chris Ware (Building Stories)
- 2013 Andrew C. Robinson (The 5th Beatle)
- 2014 Jules Feiffer (Kill My Mother)
- 2015 Ethan Young (Nanjing: The Burning City)
- 2016 Rick Geary (Black Dahlia)
- 2017 Emil Ferris (My Favorite Thing Is Monsters)
- 2018 Peter Kuper (Kafkaesque)
- 2019 Harmony Becker (They Called Us Enemy)
- 2020 Jared Cullum (Kodi)
- 2021 Eric Powell (Did You Hear What Eddie Gein Done?)
- 2022 Alex Ross
- 2023 Sarah Bollinger (Malcolm and the Perfect Song)

=== Greeting Cards Award ===
- 1991 Patrick McDonnell
- 1992 Sandra Boynton
- 1993 W. B. Park
- 1994 Roy Doty
- 1995 Rick Stromoski
- 1996 Suzy Spafford
- 1997 Dave Coverly
- 1998 Rick Stromoski
- 1999 Anne Gibbons
- 2000 Bill Brewer
- 2001 Oliver Christianson
- 2002 Glenn McCoy
- 2003 Glenn McCoy
- 2004 Glenn McCoy
- 2005 Gary McCoy
- 2006 Carla Ventresca
- 2007 Dave Mowder
- 2008 Jem Sullivan
- 2009 Debbie Tomasi
- 2010 Jim Benton
- 2011 Glenn McCoy
- 2012 Jem Sullivan
- 2013 Mark Parisi
- 2014 Glenn McCoy
- 2015 Jim Benton
- 2016 Debbie Tomasi
- 2018 Maria Scrivan
- 2019 Scott Nickel
- 2020 Scott Nickel
- 2021 Scott Jensen

=== Magazine Feature and Magazine Illustration Award ===
This award (originally titled Illustration) was separated from the Advertising and Illustration Award from 1976 to 1981. It then became permanently separated in 1986. The award name changed to Magazine and Book Illustration in 1989, and then changed to the current name in 2003. In 2018, this and Magazine Feature/Magazine Illustration Award was folded into one category to become Newspaper & Magazine Illustration.

- 1976 Arnold Roth
- 1977 Harry Devlin
- 1978 Harry Devlin
- 1979 Arnold Roth
- 1980 Ronald Searle
- 1981 Arnold Roth
- 1986 Arnold Roth
- 1987 Arnold Roth
- 1988 Arnold Roth
- 1989 Sergio Aragonés
- 1990 Harry Devlin
- 1991 Patrick McDonnell
- 1992 Burne Hogarth
- 1993 Hal Mayforth
- 1994 Rick Geary
- 1995 Richard Thompson
- 1996 Doug Cushman
- 1997 Guy Gilchrist
- 1998 Guy Gilchrist
- 1999 Kevin Rechin
- 2000 Peter de Sève
- 2001 Mark Brewer
- 2002 C. F. Payne
- 2003 Hermann Meija
- 2004 Jack Pittman
- 2005 C. F. Payne
- 2006 Steve Brodner
- 2007 Daryll Collins
- 2008 Sam Viviano
- 2009 Ray Alma
- 2010 Anton Emdin
- 2011 Edward Sorel
- 2012 Anton Emdin
- 2013 Dave Whamond
- 2014 Tom Richmond
- 2015 Anton Emdin
- 2016 Jon Adams
- 2017 Peter Kuper

=== Newspaper Illustration Award ===
In 2018, this and Magazine Feature/Magazine Illustration Award was folded into one category to become Newspaper & Magazine Illustration.

- 1994 Jerry Dowling
- 1995 Richard Thompson
- 1996 David Clark
- 1997 Bob Staake
- 1998 Grey Blackwell
- 1999 Pierre Bellocq
- 2000 Drew Friedman
- 2001 Miel Prudencio Ma
- 2002 Steve McGarry
- 2003 Bob Rich
- 2004 Michael McParlane
- 2005 Bob Rich
- 2006 Laurie Triefeldt
- 2007 Sean Kelly
- 2008 Mark Marturello
- 2009 Tom Richmond
- 2010 Michael McParlane
- 2011 Bob Rich
- 2012 Dave Whamond
- 2013 Miel Prudencio Ma
- 2014 Anton Emdin
- 2015 Anton Emdin
- 2016 David Rowe
- 2017 Dave Whamond

=== Newspaper & Magazine Illustration ===
- 2018 Tom Bunk
- 2019 Tom Richmond
- 2020 Peter Kuper
- 2021 Nick Galifianakis
- 2022 Nick Galifianakis
- 2023 Nick Galifianakis

=== Newspaper Panel Award ===
- 1956 George Lichty (Grin and Bear It)
- 1957 Jimmy Hatlo (They'll Do It Every Time)
- 1958 Bob Barnes (The Better Half)
- 1959 Jimmy Hatlo (They'll Do It Every Time)
- 1960 George Lichty (Grin and Bear It)
- 1961 George Clark (The Neighbors)
- 1962 George Lichty (Grin and Bear It)
- 1963 Jerry Robinson (Still Life)
- 1964 George Lichty (Grin and Bear It)
- 1965 Jim Berry (Berry's World)
- 1966 Jim Berry (Berry's World)
- 1967 Bil Keane (The Family Circus)
- 1968 Bob Dunn (They'll Do It Every Time)
- 1969 Bob Dunn (They'll Do It Every Time)
- 1970 Jack Tippit (Amy)
- 1971 Bil Keane (The Family Circus)
- 1972 Jim Berry (Berry's World)
- 1973 Bil Keane (The Family Circus)
- 1974 Bil Keane (The Family Circus)
- 1975 Bill Hoest (The Lockhorns)
- 1976 Paul Frehm (Ripley's Believe It or Not!)
- 1977 Ted Key (Hazel)
- 1978 Brad Anderson (Marmaduke)
- 1979 Bob Dunn & Al Scaduto (They'll Do It Every Time)
- 1980 Bill Hoest (The Lockhorns)
- 1981 Henry Boltinoff (Stoker the Broker)
- 1982 Jim Unger (Herman)
- 1983 Bob Thaves (Frank and Ernest)
- 1984 Bob Thaves (Frank and Ernest)
- 1985 Gary Larson (The Far Side)
- 1986 Bob Thaves (Frank and Ernest)
- 1987 Jim Unger (Herman)
- 1988 Gary Larson (The Far Side)
- 1989 N/A. See Newspaper Comic Strip Award.
- 1990 N/A. See Newspaper Comic Strip Award.
- 1991 Al Scaduto (They'll Do It Every Time)
- 1992 Don Addis (Bent Offerings)
- 1993 Bill Rechin (Out of Bounds)
- 1994 Dave Coverly (Speed Bump)
- 1995 Wiley Miller (Non Sequitur)
- 1996 Wiley Miller (Non Sequitur)
- 1997 David Gantz (Gantz Glances)
- 1998 Wiley Miller (Non Sequitur)
- 1999 Dan Piraro (Bizarro)
- 2000 Dan Piraro (Bizarro)
- 2001 Dan Piraro (Bizarro)
- 2002 Dave Coverly (Speed Bump)
- 2003 Jerry Van Amerongen (Ballard Street)
- 2004 Marcus Hamilton (Dennis the Menace)
- 2005 Jerry Van Amerongen (Ballard Street)
- 2006 Hilary B. Price (Rhymes with Orange)
- 2007 Chad Carpenter (Tundra)
- 2008 Mark Parisi (off the mark)
- 2009 Hilary B. Price (Rhymes with Orange)
- 2010 Glenn McCoy (Flying McCoys)
- 2011 Mark Parisi (Off The Mark)
- 2012 Hilary B. Price (Rhymes with Orange)
- 2013 Dave Coverly (Speed Bump)
- 2014 Hilary B. Price (Rhymes With Orange)
- 2015 Dan Piraro (Bizarro)
- 2016 Nick Galifianakis (Nick and Zuzu)
- 2017 Mark Parisi (Off the Mark)
- 2018 Dave Blazek (Loose Parts)
- 2019 Dave Blazek (Loose Parts)
- 2020 Mark Parisi (Off the Mark)
- 2021 Dave Coverly (Speed Bump)
- 2022 Dave Blazek (Loose Parts)
- 2023 Wayno (Bizarro)

=== Newspaper Strip Award ===
The Newspaper Comic Strips (Humor) Category was created in 1957. In 1960, it was joined by the Newspaper Comic Strips (Story) Category. In 1989 the two categories were combined. Also, in 1989 and 1990, Newspaper Panel Cartoon was part of this category.

- 1957 Gus Arriola (Gordo) and Frank King (Gasoline Alley) (tie) (Humor)
- 1958 Martin Branner (Winnie Winkle) (Humor)
- 1959 Dik Browne (Hi and Lois) (Humor)
- 1960 Dik Browne (Hi and Lois) (Humor) and Leonard Starr (On Stage) (Story)
- 1961 Ernie Bushmiller (Nancy) (Humor) and Irwin Hasen (Dondi) (Story)
- 1962 Charles M. Schulz (Peanuts) (Humor) and Irwin Hasen (Dondi) (Story)
- 1963 Fred Lasswell (Barney Google and Snuffy Smith) (Humor) and Leonard Starr (On Stage) (Story)
- 1964 Frank O'Neal (Short Ribs) (Humor) and Hal Foster (Prince Valiant) (Story)
- 1965 Gus Arriola (Gordo) (Humor) and Roy Crane (Buz Sawyer) (Story)
- 1966 Mort Walker (Beetle Bailey) (Humor) and John Prentice (Rip Kirby) (Story)
- 1967 Johnny Hart (B.C.) (Humor) and John Prentice (Rip Kirby) (Story)
- 1968 Al Smith (Mutt and Jeff) (Humor) and Alex Kotzky (Apartment 3-G) (Story)
- 1969 Mort Walker (Beetle Bailey) (Humor) and Stan Drake (The Heart of Juliet Jones) (Story)
- 1970 Bud Blake (Tiger) (Humor) and Stan Drake (The Heart of Juliet Jones) (Story)
- 1971 Brant Parker (The Wizard of Id) (Humor) and John Cullen Murphy (Big Ben Bolt and Prince Valiant) (Story)
- 1972 Dik Browne (Hi and Lois) (Humor) and Stan Drake (The Heart of Juliet Jones) (Story)
- 1973 Mell Lazarus (Miss Peach) (Humor) and Dick Moores (Gasoline Alley) (Story)
- 1974 Reg Smythe (Andy Capp) (Humor) and John Cullen Murphy (Prince Valiant) (Story)
- 1975 Russell Myers (Broom-Hilda) (Humor) and Dale Messick (Brenda Starr, Reporter) (Story)
- 1976 Brant Parker (The Wizard of Id) (Humor) and John Cullen Murphy (Prince Valiant) (Story)
- 1977 Dik Browne (Hi and Lois) (Humor) and Gil Kane (Star Hawks) (Story)
- 1978 Bud Blake (Tiger) (Humor) and John Cullen Murphy (Prince Valiant) (Story)
- 1979 Mell Lazarus (Miss Peach) (Humor) and Milton Caniff (Steve Canyon) (Story)
- 1980 Brant Parker (The Wizard of Id) (Humor) and Dick Moores (Gasoline Alley) (Story)
- 1981 Jim Davis (Garfield) (Humor) and Dick Moores (Gasoline Alley) (Story)
- 1982 Brant Parker (The Wizard of Id) (Humor) and Dick Moores (Gasoline Alley) (Story)
- 1983 Brant Parker (The Wizard of Id) (Humor) and Leonard Starr (Annie) (Story)
- 1984 Dik Browne (Hägar the Horrible) (Humor) and John Cullen Murphy (Prince Valiant) (Story)
- 1985 Jim Davis (Garfield) (Humor) and Dick Moores (Gasoline Alley) (Story)
- 1986 Dik Browne (Hägar the Horrible) (Humor) and John Prentice (Rip Kirby) (Story)
- 1987 Art and Chip Sansom (The Born Loser) (Humor) and John Cullen Murphy (Prince Valiant) (Story)
- 1988 Bill Watterson (Calvin and Hobbes) (Humor) and Jim Scancarelli (Gasoline Alley) (Story)
- 1989 Johnny Hart (B.C.)
- 1990 Art and Chip Sansom (The Born Loser)
- 1991 Lynn Johnston (For Better or For Worse)
- 1992 Wiley Miller (Non Sequitur)
- 1993 Bud Grace (Ernie)
- 1994 Garry Trudeau (Doonesbury)
- 1995 Rick Kirkman (Baby Blues)
- 1996 Patrick McDonnell (Mutts)
- 1997 Scott Adams (Dilbert)
- 1998 Jerry Scott & Jim Borgman (Zits)
- 1999 Jerry Scott & Jim Borgman (Zits)
- 2000 Bud Blake (Tiger)
- 2001 Brian Crane (Pickles)
- 2002 Darby Conley (Get Fuzzy)
- 2003 Stephan Pastis (Pearls Before Swine)
- 2004 Glenn McCoy (The Duplex)
- 2005 Brooke McEldowney (9 Chickweed Lane)
- 2006 Stephan Pastis (Pearls Before Swine)
- 2007 Jim Meddick (Monty)
- 2008 Mark Tatulli (Liō)
- 2009 Jerry Scott and Jim Borgman (Zits)
- 2010 Jeff Parker and Steve Kelley (Dustin)
- 2011 Glenn McCoy (The Duplex)
- 2012 Brian Basset (Red and Rover)
- 2013 Isabella Bannerman (Six Chix)
- 2014 Stephan Pastis (Pearls Before Swine)
- 2015 Terri Libenson (The Pajama Diaries)
- 2016 Steve Kelley and Jeff Parker (Dustin)
- 2017 Mike Peters (Mother Goose and Grimm)
- 2018 Will Henry (Wallace the Brave)
- 2019 Brian Crane (Pickles)
- 2020 Ricardo Siri (Macanudo)
- 2021 John Hambrock (The Brilliant Mind of Edison Lee)
- 2022 Will Henry (Wallace the Brave)
- 2023 Tauhid Bondia (Crabgrass)

=== On-Line Comic Strip ===
The award for webcomics was first awarded in 2012 for work produced during the previous year. It was divided the following year into two separate categories, "On-Line Comics – Short Form" and "On-Line Comics – Long Form".

- 2011 Jon Rosenberg (Scenes from a Multiverse)

==== On-Line Comics – Short Form ====
- 2012 Graham Harrop (Ten Cats)
- 2013 Ryan Pagelow (Buni)
- 2014 Danielle Corsetto (Girls with Slingshots)
- 2015 Dave Kellett (Sheldon)
- 2016 Ruben Bolling (Donald & John)
- 2017 Gemma Correll (Gemma Correll)
- 2018 Dorothy Gambrell (Cat and Girl)
- 2019 Jim Benton (Jim Benton)
- 2020 Rosemary Mosco (Bird and Moon)
- 2021 Rich Powell (Wide Open!)
- 2022 Rich Powell (Wide Open!)
- 2023 Sarah Andersen (Sarah's Scribbles)

==== On-Line Comics – Long Form ====
- 2012 Vince Dorse (Untold Tales of Bigfoot)
- 2013 Jeff Smith (Tuki: Save the Humans)
- 2014 Minna Sundberg (Stand Still, Stay Silent)
- 2015 Drew Weing (The Creepy Casefiles of Margo Maloo)
- 2016 Ngozi Ukazu (OMG Check Please)
- 2017 John Allison (Bad Machinery)
- 2018 Yuko Ota and Ananth Hirsh (Barbarous)
- 2019 Alec Longstreth (Isle of Elsi)
- 2020 Tom Siddell (Gunnerkrigg Court)
- 2021 Dan Piraro (Peyote Cowboy)
- 2022 Phil Foglio (Girl Genius)
- 2023 Evan Dahm (3rd Voice)

=== Variety Entertainment ===
First introduced in 2019, Variety Entertainment is defined as any newspaper, magazine, or online cartoon feature that contains puzzles, games, activities, trivia, history, or instruction.

- 2018 Dave Klüg
- 2019 Joe Wos (Mazetoons)
- 2020 John Graziano (Ripley's Believe it or Not!)
- 2021 Bill Morrison (All You Nerd is Love: A Yellow Submarine Puzzle Book)
- 2022 Scott Nickel
- 2023 Chuck Dillon (Highlights for Children)

== Discontinued categories ==
=== Special Features Award ===
- 1965 Jerry Robinson, Flubs and Fluffs
- 1966 Hal Foster, Prince Valiant
- 1967 Hal Foster, Prince Valiant
- 1968 Bruce Stark, Stark Impressions
- 1969 Chon Day, Brother Sebastian
- 1970 Jim Berry, Berry's World
- 1971 Al Jaffee, Mad Fold-Ins
- 1972 Jim Berry, Berry at the Democratic Convention
- 1973 Frank Fogarty, Illuminated Scrolls
- 1974 Burne Hogarth, Jungle Tales of Tarzan
- 1975 Al Jaffee, Snappy Answers to Stupid Questions
- 1976 Bil Keane, Channel Chuckles
- 1977 Sergio Aragones, Mad
- 1978 Jud Hurd, Health Capsules
- 1979 Arnold Roth, Humorous Illustration
- 1980 Sam Norkin, Theatrical Caricature
- 1981 Don Martin, Mad
- 1982 Don Martin, Mad
- 1983 Al Kilgore. Elvis the Paper Doll Book
- 1984 Kevin McVey, Theatrical Caricature
- 1985 Mort Drucker, Mad
- 1986 Mort Drucker, Mad
- 1987 Mort Drucker, Mad
- 1988 Mort Drucker, Mad

=== New Media Award ===
- 2000 Bill Hinds
- 2001 Mark Fiore
- 2002 Mark Fiore

=== Sports Cartoons Award ===
- 1957 Willard Mullin
- 1958 Willard Mullin
- 1959 Willard Mullin
- 1960 Willard Mullin
- 1961 Willard Mullin
- 1962 Willard Mullin
- 1963 Lou Darvas
- 1964 Willard Mullin
- 1965 Willard Mullin
- 1966 Bruce Stark
- 1967 Lou Darvas
- 1968 Bill Gallo
- 1969 Bill Gallo
- 1970 Bill Gallo
- 1971 Karl Hubenthal
- 1972 Bill Gallo
- 1973 Bill Gallo
- 1974 Murray Olderman
- 1975 Bruce Stark
- 1976 Arnold Roth
- 1977 Arnold Roth
- 1978 Murray Olderman
- 1979 Karl Hubenthal
- 1980 Karl Hubenthal
- 1981 Eddie Germano
- 1982 Karl Hunbenthal
- 1983 Bill Gallo
- 1984 Bill Gallo
- 1985 Bill Gallo
- 1986 Bill Hinds
- 1987 Bill Gallo and Paul Szep (tie)
- 1988 Bill Gallo
- 1989 (no award)
- 1990 (no award)
- 1991 Pierre Bellocq
- 1992 Eddie Germano
- 1993 Drew Litton

== Other NCS awards ==
See: Reuben Award
See: Other NCS awards

== See also ==
- List of comics awards
