= Sansom =

Sansom is a surname. Notable people with the surname include:

- Allison Sansom (born 1994), Thai model
- Ann Sansom, English poet
- Art Sansom (1920–1991), American cartoonist
- Arthur Ernest Sansom (1838–1907), English medical doctor
- C. J. Sansom (1952–2024), British writer
- Chip Sansom, American comic strip cartoonist
- Clive Sansom (1910–1981), British-born Tasmanian poet and playwright
- Dixie Sansom (born 1948/1949), American politician
- Emma Sansom (1847–1900), American Civil War person
- Ernest William Sansom (1890–1982), Canadian general
- Gareth Sansom (born 1939), Australian artist
- George Bailey Sansom (1883–1965), British historian
- Henrietta Consuelo Sansom, Countess of Quigini Puliga (1847-1938), French writer
- Ian Sansom (born 1966), English writer
- Ivan Sansom, British palaeontologist
- Ken Sansom (1927–2012), American actor and voice actor
- Kenny Sansom (born 1958), English footballer
- Odette Sansom, (1912–1995), Special Operations Executive agent, World War II
- Peter Sansom (born 1958), English poet
- Philip Sansom (1916–1999), British writer and anarchist
- Ray Sansom (born 1962), American politician
- Rosa Olga Sansom (1900–1989), New Zealand educator, botanist and writer
- William Sansom (1763–1840), Philadelphia developer of Jewelers' Row and namesake of Sansom Street
- William Sansom (1912–1976), English writer
