= Sams =

Sams or SAMS can refer to:

== As an acronym ==
- Sadat Academy for Management Sciences
- School of Advanced Military Studies
- Scottish Association for Marine Science
- South African Mathematical Society
- South African Medical Service
- South African Military Health Service
- South American Mission Society
- Special administrative measure (SAMs)
- Statin-associated muscle symptoms
- Surface-to-air missile (SAMs)
- Syrian American Medical Society

== Companies ==
- Sams Publishing
- Sam's Club

== People ==
=== Born before 1950 ===
- William Sams (1792–1871), Australian government official and entrepreneur
- Ferrol Sams (1922–2013), American physician and novelist
- Eric Sams (1926–2004), British musicologist and Shakespeare scholar
- B. J. Sams (television) (born 1935), American local television news personality
- Michael Sams (born 1941), English capital criminal
- B. B. Sams (born 1944), American artist and illustrator
- George W. Sams Jr. (born c. 1946), former field marshal of the American Black Panther Party
- Greg Sams (born 1948), American-British artist, author, inventor; creator of the veggie burger
- John B. Sams (living), American Air Force Lieutenant General and businessman

=== Born after 1950 ===
- Dallas Sams (1952–2007), American politician
- Daniel Sams (born 1992), Australian cricketer
- Emily Sams
- Jeremy Sams (born 1957), British theatre director, composer and playwright
- Lionel Sams (born 1961), English professional darts player
- Jeffrey D. Sams (born 1964), American television actor
- B.J. Sams (American football) (born 1980), American professional football player
- Pernille Sams (born 1959), Danish real estate agent, lawyer and politician
- Manfred Sams (born 1972), Austrian politician
- Saba Sams (born 1996), English writer

== Places ==
- Sams, Colorado, a community in the United States

== See also ==
- Mike Sammes (1928–2001), British musician and vocal session arranger
