= Trying to Trash Betsy DeVos =

2017 political cartoon by Glenn McCoy

- Artist: Glenn McCoy
- Year: 2017

Trying to Trash Betsy DeVos is a political cartoon by American cartoonist Glenn McCoy, published on February 13, 2017, on the GoComics website as well as the Belleville News-Democrat website. The cartoon centrally depicts Betsy DeVos, the United States Secretary of Education in the Trump Administration and is thematically based on the 1964 painting The Problem We All Live With by Norman Rockwell. It attracted critical commentary in mainstream media.

== Description ==
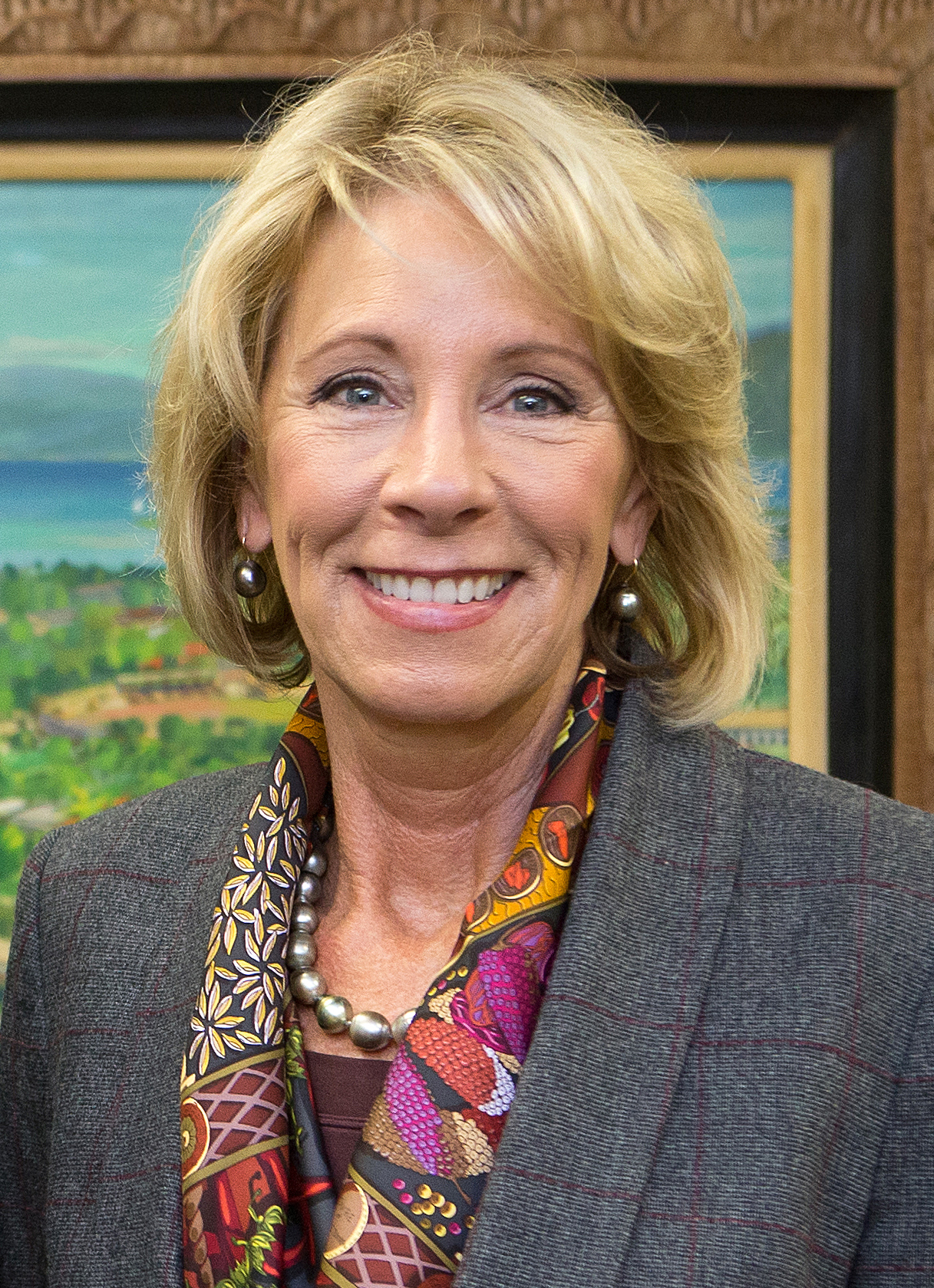
Betsy DeVos, the subject of the political cartoon

The cartoon depicts a small version of DeVos walking and surrounded by large men in suits, who are possibly guards. The remains of a thrown tomato can also be seen. The word "CONSERVATiVE" is scrawled on the background wall in gray graffiti in addition to a red anarchy symbol. The abbreviation for the National Education Association is also written on the lefthand side.

== Publication ==
The cartoon was published online on February 13, 2017, on the GoComics website, in addition to multiple newspapers. It was also published on the website of the Belleville News-Democrat.

== Reaction ==
Commentators point out that the political cartoon draws directly upon The Problem We All Live With by Norman Rockwell, which depicts Ruby Bridges being escorted to school as a child during a time when crowds of white protesters would actively prevent desegregation efforts initiated by the Brown v. Board of Education case. McCoy confirmed that he used the Rockwell piece as an inspiration for the political cartoon.

On social media, the cartoon was met with unfavorable criticism. Readers of the Belleville News-Democrat demanded both that McCoy apologize and that he be terminated from his position.

Many complaints centered upon an alleged false equivalency. Among others, Chelsea Clinton responded publicly by expressing outrage at the cartoon, and subsequently pointed out The Problem We All Live With on Twitter. One reason for this reaction was due to the explicit comparison of opposition to DeVos with themes of racism explored in Norman Rockwell's The Problem We All Live With. German Lopez at Vox.com opined that "protests against DeVos and racial segregation in American schools are not the same". Jillian Steinhauer asserted that McCoy's work is an example of false equivalence, saying, "Glenn McCoy appropriated Norman Rockwell's The Problem We All Live With, replacing the six-year-old black girl who desegregated a public school with the billionaire Secretary of Education". USA Today highlighted a comment from a reader who responded to the image, claiming it represents an example of white privilege.

A representative for the National Education Association offered no comment on the political cartoon.

McCoy responded to criticism via e-mail, saying, "I regret if anyone was offended by my choice of metaphors", and noted that he wanted to draw attention to and start public discussion on the behavior of protesters. In a statement on the Belleville News-Democrat website, McCoy also expressed disappointment that, "decades beyond the civil rights protests... people are still being denied the right to speak freely or do their jobs or enter public buildings because others disagree with who they are or how they think". Faced with accusations that the image is hateful, McCoy defended his work, saying, "I thought I was speaking out against hate... You may disagree with her on issues but I didn't see any hate coming from her. I did, however, see hate going in the other direction, which is what made me think of the Rockwell image. That was the only comparison I was drawing".
