= Jagodić =

Slavic surname

Jagodić (other spelling variants Jagodic, Jagodič, Yagodich, Jagodich, Jagodics, Jagodits, Jagodity, Agotics) is a surname composed of the female given name Jagoda and the Slavic suffix -ić.

== Origin and tradition ==
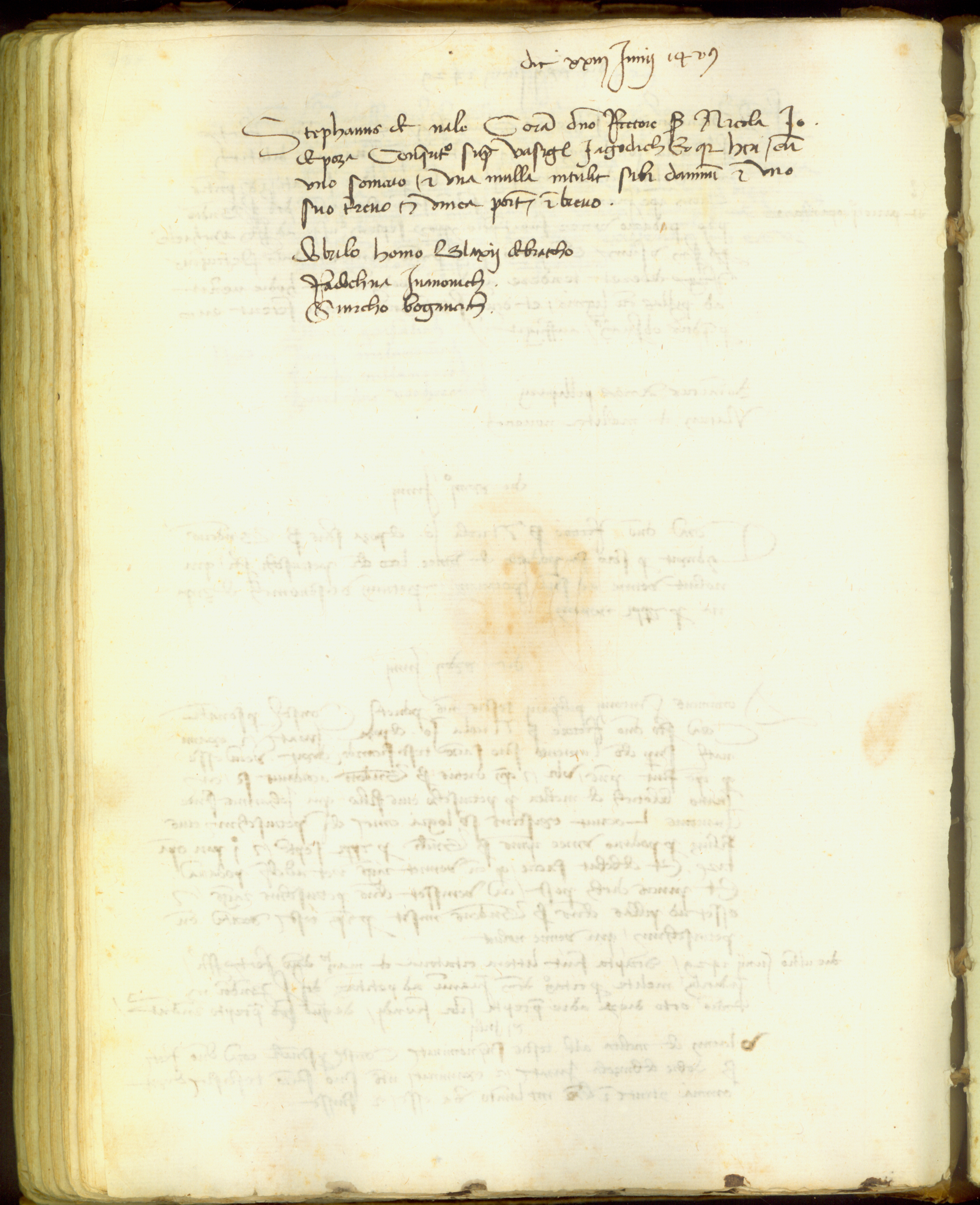
Lamenta de foris, VIII, 205v, 23. Juni 1429

The origin of the surname Jagodić has not been conclusively determined, but goes back to the female given name Jagoda. Thus, it is a matronym.

According to some oral family traditions, the surname traces back to a widowed mother or grandmother named Jagoda (Baba Jagoda). There are traditions according to which ancestors took the surname of their landlord on whose estate they served. Such narratives can be found especially in Slavonia and other areas within the historical military frontier. In some oral traditions, the maiden name of the mother or the surname of the stepfather was adopted. In other traditions, the surname was adopted by Hajducks from Montenegro, who thus tried to blur their original identity.

Mention in medieval and Habsburg archival documents suggests an origin in the Serbo-Croatian language area. The earliest evidence of the surname Jagodić can be found in the Dubrovnik State Archives.

== Distribution ==
There are several thousand bearers of the surname Jagodić in various spellings. The most common spellings are:

- Jagodić (60.4%, in Serbia, Bosnia and Herzegovina, and Croatia)
- Jagodic (17.2%, especially in the Kranj region of Slovenia)
- Jagodič (11.3%, in Slovenia, Slovenianized spelling)
- Jagodics (4.7%, in Hungary, together with Jagodits and Jagodity)
- Jagoditsch (2.0%, in Austria)
- Yagodich (1.6%, in Australia and the USA)

According to the Forebears DMCC genealogy institute, most name bearers live in Slovenia (ca. 1,500), followed by Serbia (ca. 1,200), Bosnia and Herzegovina (ca. 1,050) and Croatia (ca. 800), although the number of name bearers in Croatia decreased significantly after World War II and after the Croatian War. A large number of name bearers of Serbian descent migrated from Virovitica, Osijek, Donji Miholjac and Karlovac to Vojvodina. On the one hand, the resettlement occurred due to the colonization policy since the First World War, on the other hand, due to war and expulsion. A large number of bearers of the Croatian name migrated to the USA and Argentina before the Second World War.

== Archive ==
The first documented mention of the surname Jagodić is found in the medieval archives of the city of Dubrovnik. This is a court document of the Venetian government in Dubrovnik (then Ragusa). In it, a merchant by the name of Visgl Jagodich (lat. Vasilije Jagodić) is put on trial because his loaded mules invaded the vineyards of a certain Stephanus de Nale. The exact outcome is not known, but the incident was witnessed by court witnesses present. The exact wording in the court document translated reads:

=== (translated) Court actions against foreigners in Ragusa (Dubrovnik), VIII, 205v, 23 June 1429. ===
"Stephanus de Nale, in the presence of Lord Rector Nicola Jo. de Pozda complains about Vasilije Jagodić. Yesterday, the latter's loaded mules invaded the vineyard near Breno and caused damage. This is testified by Dobrilo (Walache from Brajići), Radoša Ivanović and Simčo Bogovčić."

=== (Original text) Lamenta de foris, VIII, 205v, 23 June 1429 ===
"Stephanus de Nale, coram domino Rectore ser Nicola Jo. de Poza conqueritur supra Vasigl Jagodich. Eo quia heri eum uno somerio et una mulla intulit sibi damnum in uno suo tereno in vinea positis in Breno. Testes: Dobrilo homo Blaxii de Braicho, Radochna Iuanovich, Simcho Bogaucich."

In the 15th and 16th centuries, the surname also falls in Belgrade, in the vicinity of Čačak, as well as on the island of Brač, in Šibenik and in Croatian Zagorje. From the 17th century, the surname Jagodić increasingly appears on the Habsburg military frontier and in the Slavonian hinterland.

== Noble family ==
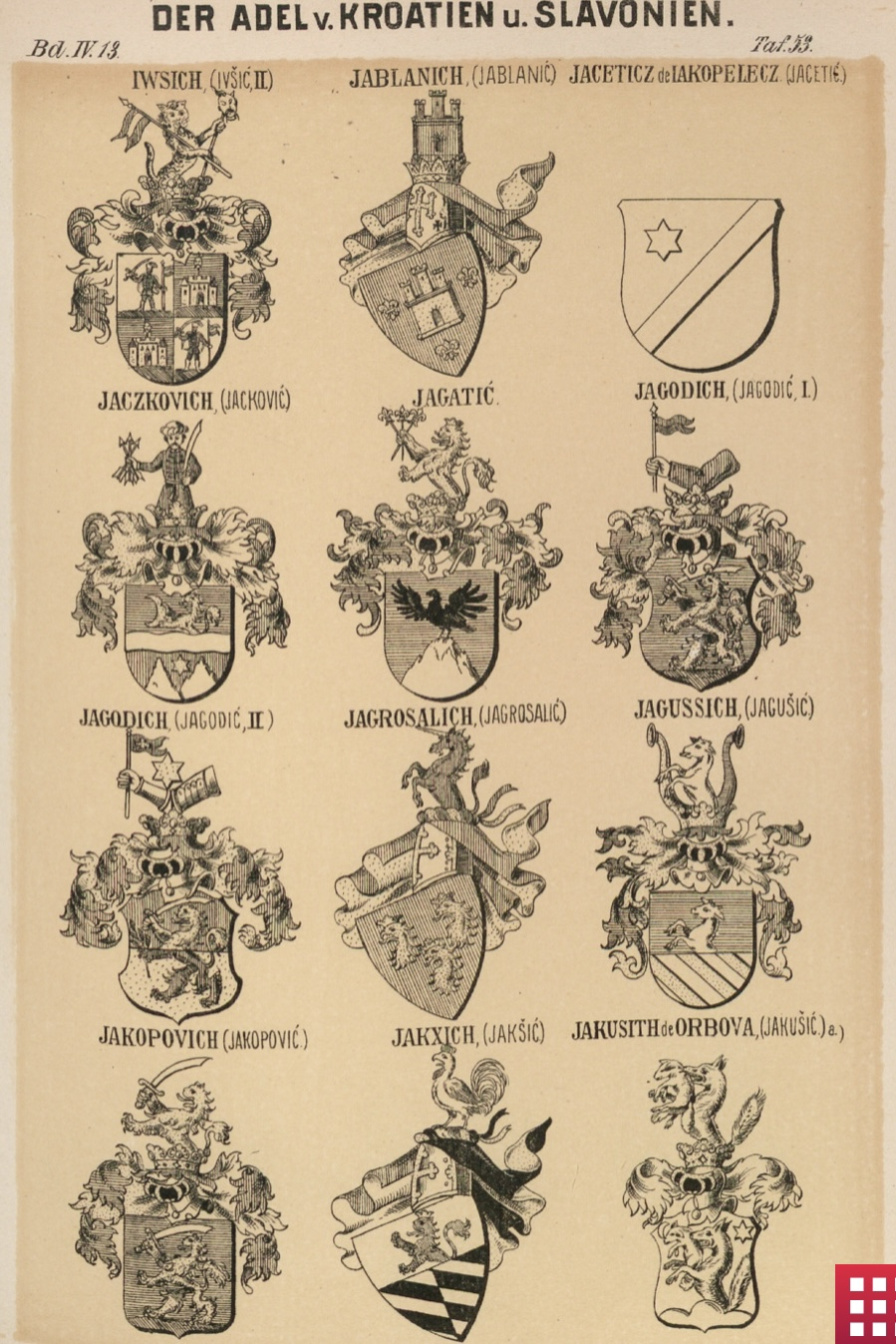
Wappenbuch Tafel 53, Jagodich

In the history of the Habsburg military frontier, three families with the surname Jagodić were raised to the nobility of the Danube Monarchy.

- on March 4, 1714, Franz and Georg Jagodich, as well as Georg's sons Georg and Emerich received the letter of nobility and coat of arms from King Charles III.
- on October 24, 1806, Alexius Jagodich, his wife Rosalia Bernard, and children Michael, Franz, Alexius, and Josefa received the Letter of Nobility and Coat of Arms from King Franz II. The close resemblance to the coat of arms of Franz and Georg Jagodich suggests a relationship.
- on September 17, 1824, Spasoje Jagodić received the letter of nobility and coat of arms from King Francis II, and the family henceforth bore the surname Jagodics de Kernyecza.

According to the coat of arms book of Enver Ljubović, the frontier major Alexius Jagodich originally came from Klis near Split. He served in the border regiment of Glina. Part of them moved to Lika to the village of Ličko Lešće, where the surname can still be found today. According to Duišin, all three descended from the same Jagodić family from Livno, from where they began their military careers in the Habsburg border regiment. Until the outbreak of the Croatian War, the Jagodić surname was frequent in Livno. According to tradition, the geographical origin of the surname is on the upper Drina River, from where they moved to Livno in the 15th century via Sarajevo and later Travnik.

== Family Tree and DNA project ==
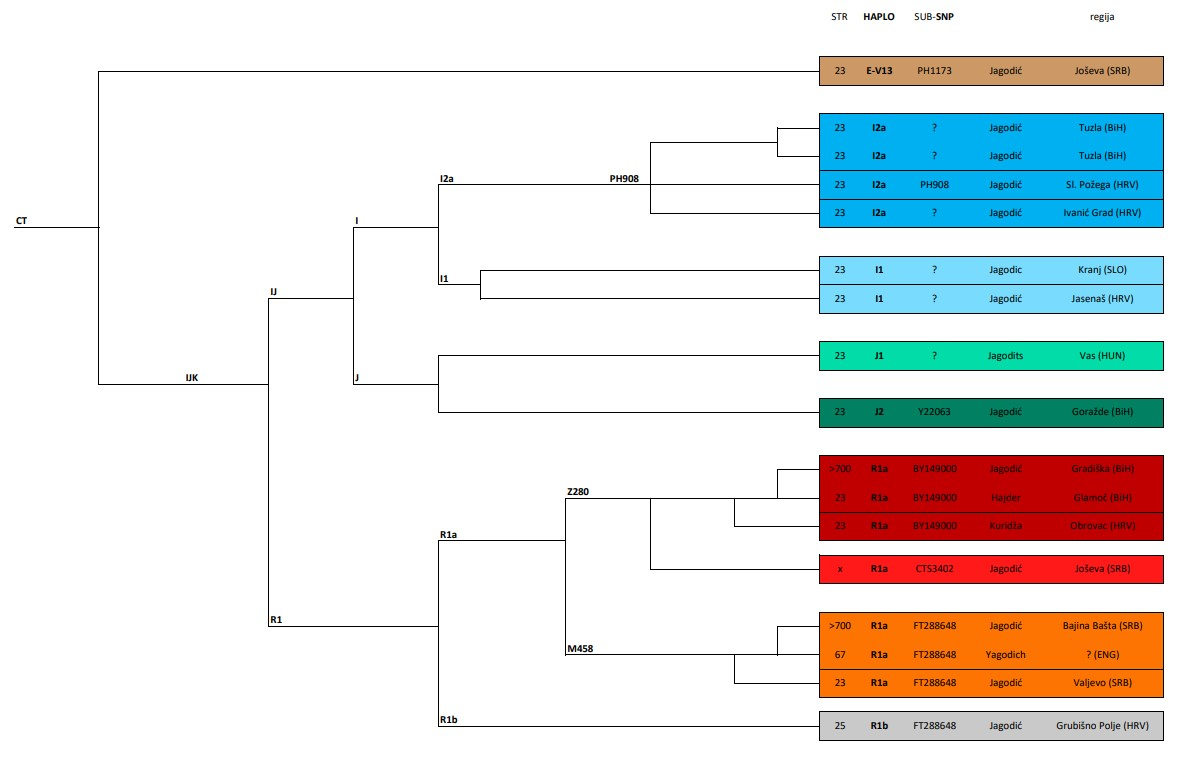
DNA Family Tree - Jagodic DNA project

In April 2022, a private DNA study was conducted with the aim of creating a genetic family tree of the Jagodic family. Fifteen families from Hungary, Slovenia, Croatia, Bosnia and Herzegovina, Serbia, and Australia, bearing the surname Jagodić, and Jagodic, Jagodits, and Yagodich, respectively, participated in the study.

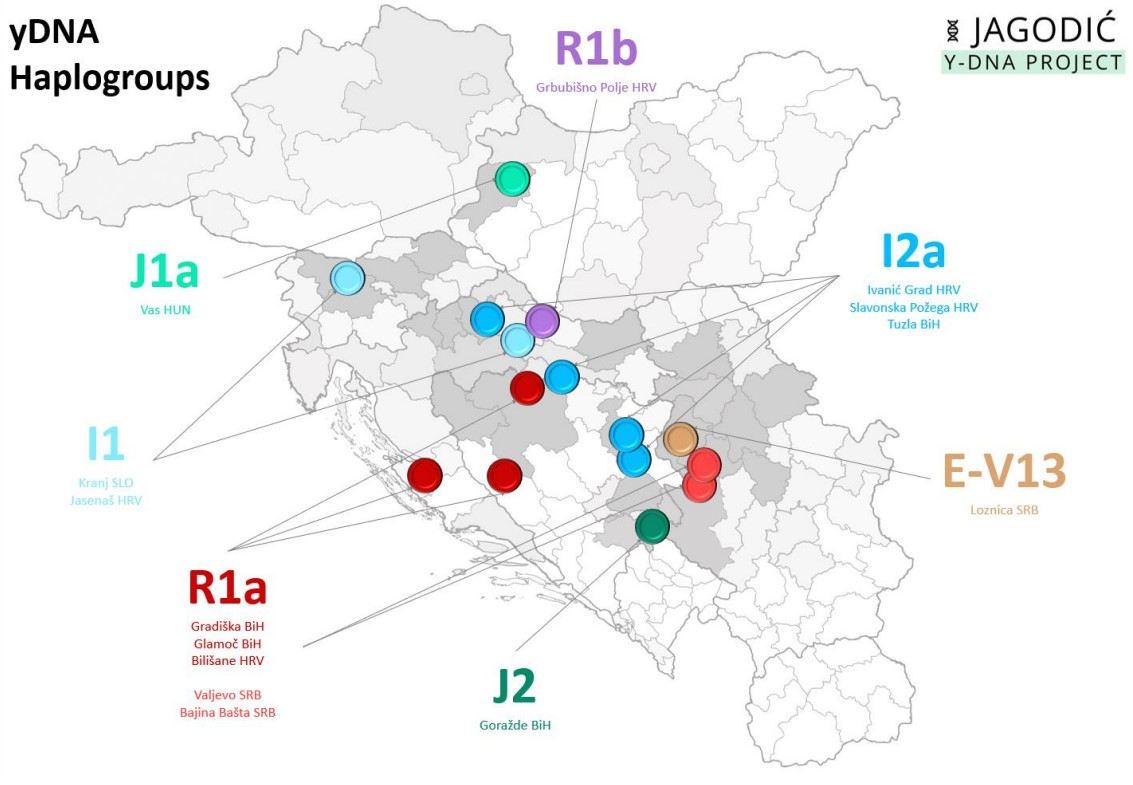
DNA Map - Jagodic DNA project

The study was conducted by the Jagodic DNA Project in collaboration with FTDNA, YSEQ and DNK Centar in Belgrade. The results of the study are published on the private platform of the Prezime-Jagodic family.

The study is still in progress and continuously capturing new DNA results, with the aim of capturing all lineages.

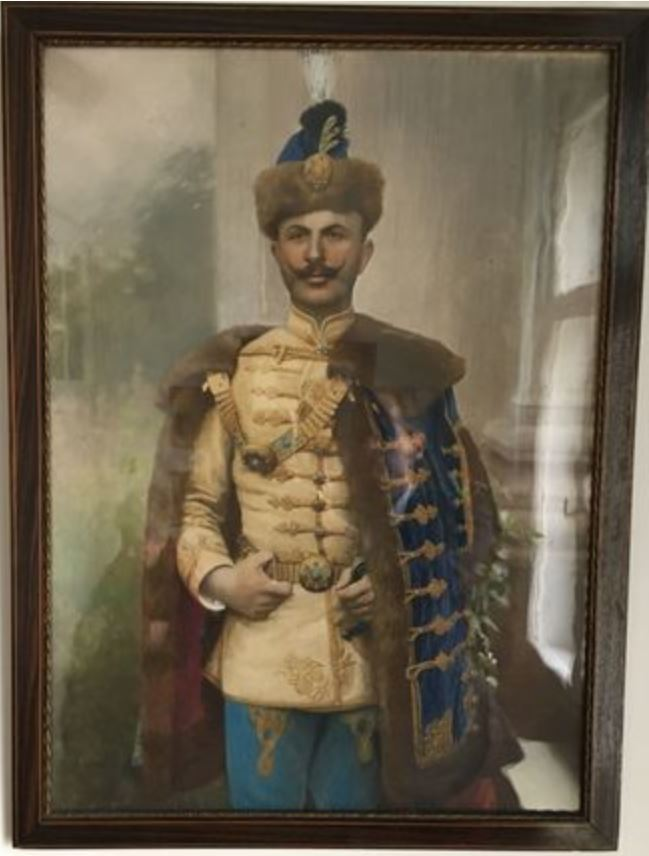
III. János Jagodics de Kernyécsa

== Notable people ==
- Rudolf Jagoditsch (1892–1972), Austrian Slavic scholar
- Vlado Jagodic (soccer coach from Bosnia and Herzegovina)
- Ema Jagodic (Miss Universe Slovenia 2011)
- Josip (Joza) Jagodić (1897–1973), doctor from Osijek, Righteous Among the Nations
- Alois Jagodic Austrian footballer
- Igor Jagodic (Michelin Star Chef from Slovenia)
- Stane Jagodič (artist)
- Martin Davorin-Jagodić Croatian contemporary music composer and educator
- Stane Jagodič Slovenian painter, photographer, caricaturist, and author
- Petar "Kuridža" Jagodić (1666-1749 in Bukovica)
- Marko Jagodić-Kuridža (basketball player)
- Tomo "Tule" Jagodić (folk singer from Lika)
- Hadži-pop Petko Jagodić (1858 in Vranjak)
