= CartoonArts International =

American comic strip syndicate

- Founded: 1978
- Founder: Jerry Robinson
- Type: Comics and cartoon syndicator
- Headquarters: New York City
- Subsidiaries: Cartoonists & Writers Syndicate

CartoonArts International is a cartooning newspaper syndication service based in the United States. CartoonArts International distributes political and humor cartoons, caricatures, and graphics internationally and is updated daily. Most cartoons are in English, with some available in Spanish as well.

CartoonArts maintains one of the world's most extensive cartoon archives, representing more than 550 artists from over 75 countries. The artists provide commentary on news stories and personalities. Categories include "Views of the World," "Regional Views," "Wit of the World," "Featured Artists," "Comment & Caricature," and "Business Views."

Cartoonists & Writers Syndicate (CWS) is a division of CartoonArts International. CWS represents such cartoonists as Javad Alizadeh, Gomaa Frahat, Roar Hagen, Stane Jagodič, Miel Prudencio Ma, Jovan Prokopljević, Lectrr, Ann Telnaes, and Martyn Turner.

== History ==
CartoonArts International was founded by comic book artist Jerry Robinson in 1978. Robinson recalled the origin:

I decided to present a world collection. It was The Best Cartoons of the Decade, because I didn't want to do an annual... and I went to McGraw-Hill with the proposal... They said, "We can't publish it with the foreign cartoonists, because nobody knows them, but the others are published in American papers, that's viable." So I said no, the whole idea of the book was to show the world of cartooning, and that we're not the only ones that have great cartoonists. I said I would only do the book if it's half American and half from around the world... The book got marvelous reviews all over. It sold out. A lot of the reviewers said almost the same thing in different words: How interesting it was to see this work from around the world, the great cartoonists in France and London and so forth, and it's too bad we only see it albums or collections like this. So that set me thinking, if I could devise a way to incorporate the best from around the world, and sell it to American newspapers, I think it would be a genuine service, a valuable feature... So I did a mock-up of a weekly round-up of six cartoons. For each one of them, I would prominently credit, each artist, the originating paper, city and country. So the readers could see where it came from and what their point of view was. It took us a year to put together the first group, I had to sign up enough artists to make it viable. I finally rounded up maybe 20 top cartoonists from about 15 different countries to launch the feature.

Robinson created Cartoonists & Writers Syndicate in 1984 in New York City.

On April 29, 2019, The New York Times Licensing Service announced it would cease to distribute cartoons from CartoonArts after it had provided an image, published in the April 25 issue of The New York Times International Edition, that was widely criticized as antisemitic.
