= Chris Payne =

Chris Payne may refer to:

- Chris Payne (soccer) (born 1990), Australian soccer player
- Chris Payne (musician) (born 1957), English musician
- Chris Fox Payne or C. F. Payne (fl. 1970s–2000s), American caricaturist and illustrator

== See also ==
- Chris Paine (fl. 1990s–2010s), American filmmaker and environmental activist
