= New York Sunday News =

New York weekly newspaper

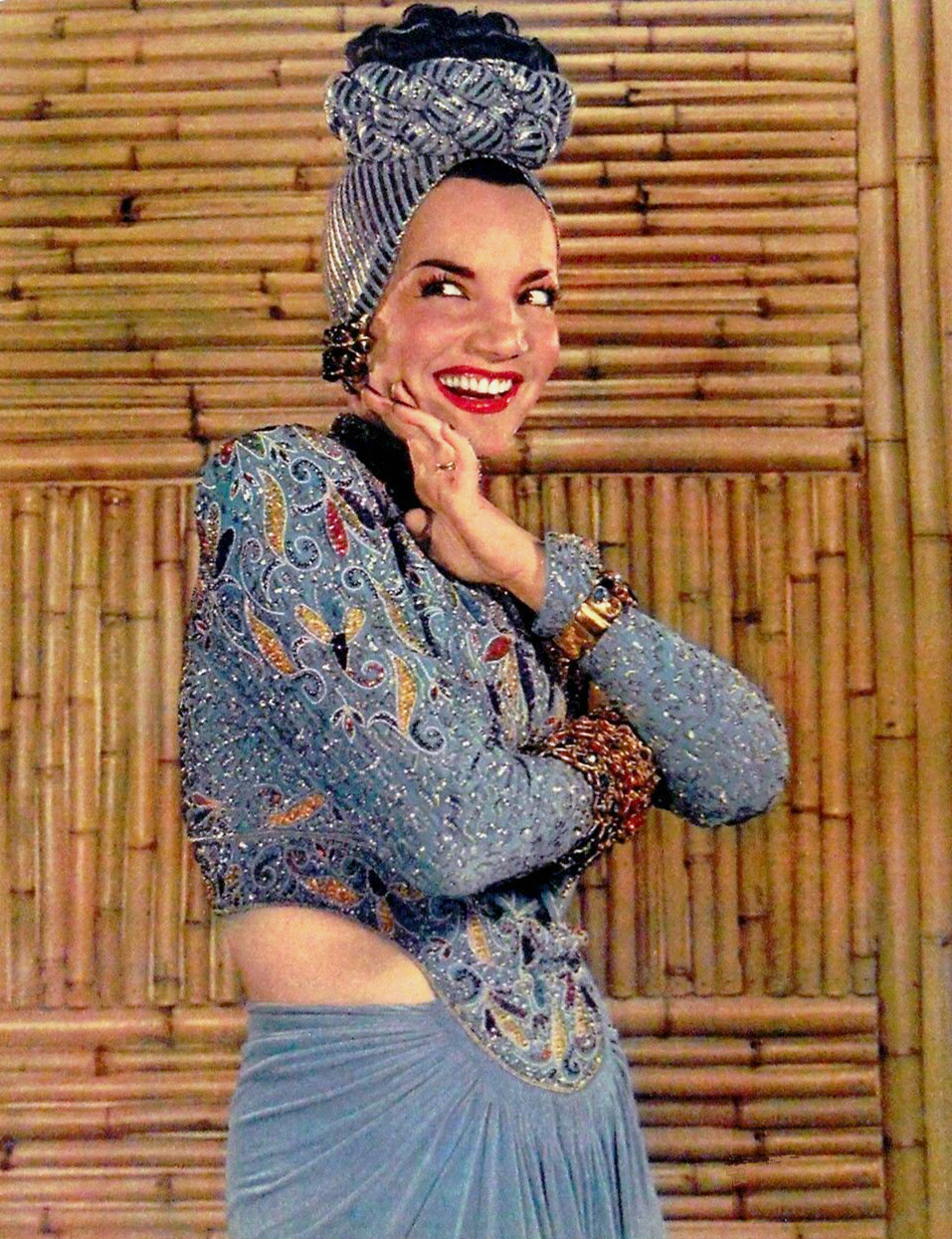
- Photo of Carmen Miranda published by the New York Sunday News in 1941
- Type: Weekly
- Format: Newspaper
- Publisher: Benjamin Wood
- Founded: 1866
- Language: English
- City: New York City, New York
- Country: United States

The New York Sunday News was the Sunday edition of the 19th and early 20th century New York Daily News. It was originally published in 1866. The original editor was Benjamin Wood, who edited the paper from 1867 to 1876. It was published in and covered New York City. A German edition was also published; this was distributed in Germany along with the English edition in New York.

The latter, unrelated New York Daily News (founded in 1919) was similarly titled Sunday News on Sundays until February 1977. One of the features of this later Sunday paper was True Classroom Flubs and Fluffs. Writers for the paper included Bob Lardine and Steven Gaines.

== Coloroto Magazine ==
Coloroto Magazine was a Sunday newspaper magazine included as a supplement to the New York Sunday News.
