= Gomaa Frahat =

Egyptian cartoonist (1941–2021)

Gomaa Frahat, known as Gomaa, (April 24, 1941 – September 24, 2021) was an Egyptian political cartoonist and satirist.

== Biography ==
Gomaa was born on April 24, 1941, in Cairo.

He worked at Rose Alyoussef and Sabah El Kher until July 1999. He also painted for 'Maged' the Emiraty children's magazine from 1972 till 1979. Most of the Egyptian opposition newspapers have published him, such as Al Shaab, Al Ahrar, Al Ahaly, Al Wafd, and Al Araby.

He published in:

- Al Ahram (Local Daily edition)
- Al Ahram Al Mesaee
- Al Ahram weekly.
- Al Fagr

He had an agent in New York, Cartoonists and Writers Syndicate (CWS) who published his work in more than 120 American newspapers and magazines and in about 25 European and Asian magazines and newspapers. Most of the international newspapers, such as the International Herald Tribune, English Times, El Luvracion, Canadian Gazette, and more, have published his works.

Some of his works are in exhibits at the German museum in Bonn and the International Museum for Caricatures in Florida.

He had his own show on the Nile News channel called "With Gomaa Every Friday", which he presented, showing cartoons from all over the world and its reaction towards the current events, whether international, Arab or national.

== Exhibitions ==
He had his own exhibition in Damascus, Syria, in 1998. His works were also presented in European exhibitions in Bulgaria, Yugoslavia and Czechoslovakia. He was attributed in group exhibitions in Arab countries such as Tunisia, Libya, Yemen and Dubai. He was also attributed in group exhibitions all over Egypt.

== Awards ==
- The Journalists' Union for both 1985 and 1989
- Award-winning for the Mustafa Amin and Ali Amin for the best Egyptian caricature for the year (1999)

== Other ==
A member of the board of the Egyptian Caricature Union since 1984.
