= True Classroom Flubs and Fluffs =

American comic strip by Jerry Robinson

- Author(s): Jerry Robinson
- Launch date: 1965
- End date: 1967
- Genre(s): non-fiction

True Classroom Flubs and Fluffs was a non-fiction American comic strip by cartoonist and comic-book artist Jerry Robinson. It was syndicated from 1965 until 1967 in Sunday newspapers, most notably the New York Sunday News (later incorporated into the New York Daily News). It was one of a very small number of syndicated comic features dependent on reader submissions.

The material for this feature was submitted to Robinson by readers, and it is supposed that each submission was a genuine error perpetrated by a student, either in oral response to a classroom question or in a written assignment.

Each Sunday edition (there was never a daily version) consisted of several spot illustrations rather than the sequential panels of a conventional comic strip. Above each drawing was a typeset caption purporting to contain the text of an authentic classroom error, followed by the name and city of the person who had submitted (not committed) the error. Robinson's drawing would then illustrate the error, sometimes including dialogue balloons for one or more of the characters in the drawing.

A typical item was a caption stating, "The transatlantic cable was laid by W.C. Fields", followed by Robinson's drawing of a caricatured W.C. Fields seated in a rowboat in the middle of the Atlantic Ocean, unspooling an immense cable. Readers were expected to recognize the error, in this case, that the actual supervisor of the transatlantic telegraph cable was C.W. Field (Cyrus West Field).

At least two compilations were published.
