= Hal Mayforth =

American cartoonist and artist

Hal Mayforth is an American cartoonist and artist who has worked in the book illustration business. He received the National Cartoonists Society Magazine and Book Illustration Award in 1993.

== Notable works ==
- Pinto
- Screaming Yellow Zonkers
- The Underappreciated Wit of Hal Mayforth
