= Bob Rich =

American cartoonist

Bob Rich is an American cartoonist. In his career Rich is a multiple Reuben Award winner for newspaper illustration (2003, 2005, 2011, and 2012). In 2013, he left his newspaper cartoonist position to join Stamford investment research and financial-media company Hedgeye. Rich illustrates his opinions on major financial and economic issues.

== See also ==
- List of cartoonists
- Silver Reuben Award
