= Terri Libenson =

American cartoonist and author

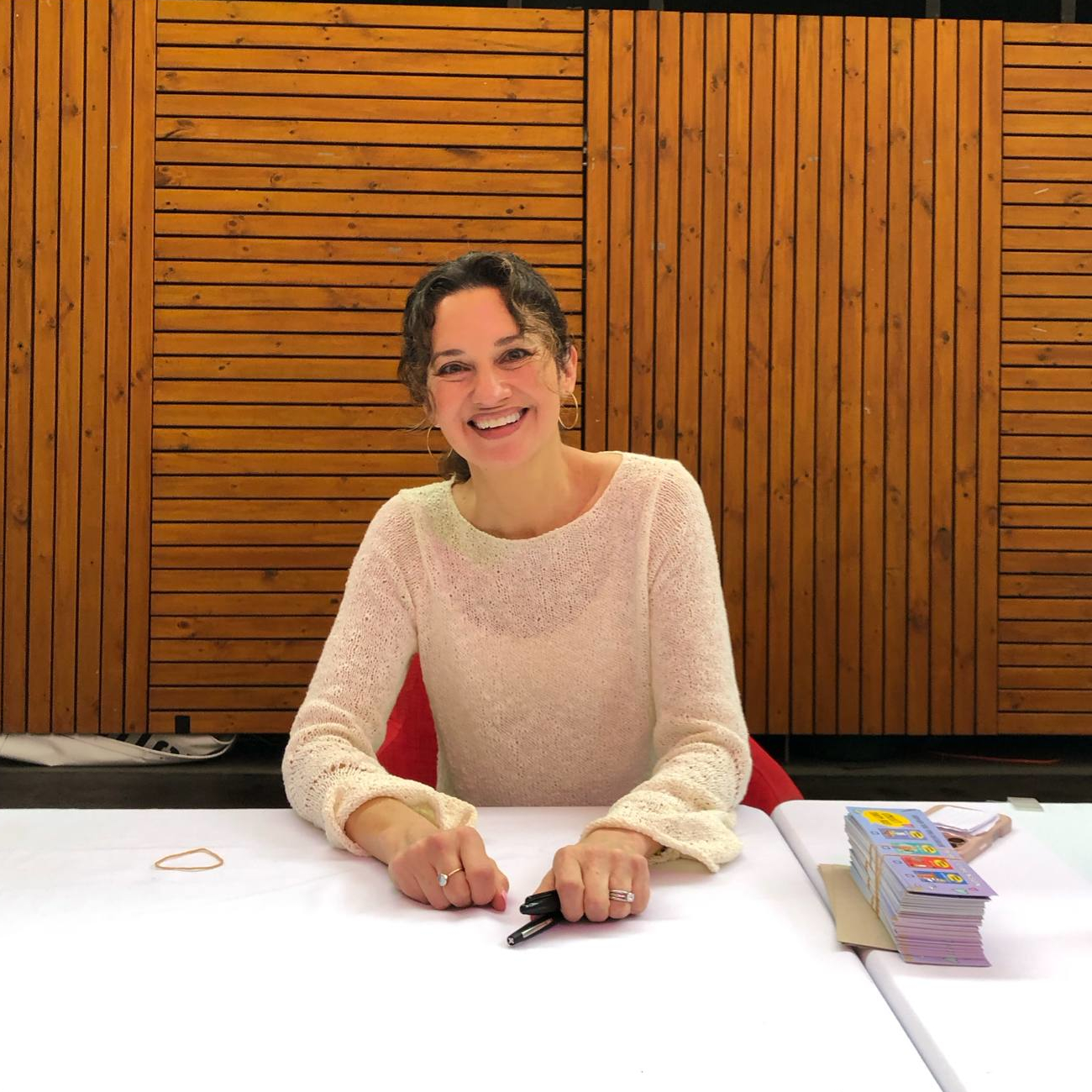
- Libenson at the Sydney Writers Festival, 2025
- Born: 1970 (age 55–56); Kingston, Pennsylvania, U.S.
- Occupations: Cartoonist, children's book author
- Known for: Emmie and Friends series; The Pajama Diaries

Terri Libenson (born 1970) is an American author and cartoonist known for her newspaper comic strip The Pajama Diaries (2006—2020), which won the 70th Silver Reuben Award for best newspaper comic strip; and the graphic novel series Emmie and Friends (2017—present).

== Early life ==
Libenson was born in Kingston, Pennsylvania in 1970. She graduated from Washington University in St. Louis with a bachelor's degree in illustration.

== Career ==
Libenson wrote for the greeting card company American Greetings for several years. She created the syndicated comic strip The Pajama Diaries in 2006. In May 2016, she won the 70th annual Silver Reuben Award for The Pajama Diaries, after voting by her fellow cartoonists at a ceremony in Memphis.

She stopped writing The Pajama Diaries in 2019 to focus on children's books. In her series of graphic novels known as Emmie and Friends, aimed at 12 to 14 year-olds, each of the books focuses on a Lakefront Middle School student who also appears in the other books. The early characters were girls but Tyler gets a look-in in a later book where his problems are solved by Emmie - at the cost of her own friendships. The first in the series, Invisible Emmie, was published in 2017. In 2020, the fourth book in the series, Becoming Brianna, was chosen as one of the youth graphic novels that defined the year by The Washington Post.

== Publications ==
- Invisible Emmie (2017)
- Positively Izzy (2018)
- Just Jaime (2019)
- Becoming Brianna (2020)
- You-Niquely You: An Emmie & Friends Interactive Journal (2020)
- Truly Tyler (2021)
- Remarkably Ruby
- Surprisingly Sarah (2023)
- Always Anthony (2024)
- Entirely Emmie (2025)
