= Glenn McCoy =

American cartoonist

- Born: 1965 (age 60–61); United States
- Occupation: Cartoonist

Glenn McCoy (born 1965) is a conservative American cartoonist, whose work includes the comic strip The Duplex and the daily panel he does with his brother Gary entitled The Flying McCoys. McCoy previously produced editorial cartoons until May 2018, when he refocused his career on animations after being discharged from his job of 22 years at the Belleville News-Democrat. All three cartoon features are syndicated by Andrews McMeel Syndication.

== Life ==
Glenn McCoy was born in 1965 and began drawing at the age of 4 under the supervision of his older brother and grandfather. His interest in cartoons and daily strips caused him to work as a cartoonist in newspapers published in his grade school, high school and college. He graduated from Southern Illinois University with a bachelor's degree in fine arts and graphic design.

After graduation, McCoy started as an art director/editorial cartoonist for the Belleville News-Democrat in his hometown of Belleville, Illinois. He also began working for Playboy as a gag cartoonist in 1992. One year later he created his best-known comic strip—The Duplex.

== Work ==
In 1993, Glenn McCoy began his comic strip The Duplex, syndicated by Universal Press Syndicate.

Glenn McCoy illustrated the Legend of Spud Murphy by Eoin Colfer which was published in 2004.

In 2005, Glenn and his brother Gary launched The Flying McCoys—a single panel comic that's syndicated through Universal Press (featured in The Los Angeles Times, Chicago Sun Times, Washington Post and about 150 other clients). The brothers switch writing and art duties on a daily basis.

McCoy has also become known for his editorial cartoons published through the Belleville News-Democrat. In 2008, Mother Jones commented that one of his cartoons portraying Barack Obama's opposition to the Born-Alive Infants Protection Act was "in extremely poor taste". In 2017, Chelsea Clinton publicly rebuked one of McCoy's political cartoons, Trying to Trash Betsy DeVos, which drew heavily from The Problem We All Live With by Norman Rockwell. He published his final editorial cartoon on May 21, 2018 after he was laid off from the Belleville News-Democrat.

McCoy worked as a storyboard artist for animated films produced by Illumination including Despicable Me, The Lorax, Despicable Me 2, The Secret Life of Pets, Minions and Despicable Me 3. and also wrote Tall Tails, a comic about Mickey Mouse and Goofy, for the Disney Adventures magazine.

== Awards received ==
- National Cartoonist Society awarded the following awards to Glenn McCoy:
  - Editorial Cartoon Award for 1997 (he has been nominated again in 2007).
  - Gag Cartoon Award for 1996, 2002, 2003, 2005 and 2009 (nominated for the Gag Cartoon Award in 1997 and 1999).
  - Greeting Card Award for 2002, 2003, 2004, 2011 and 2014.
  - Newspaper Comic Strip for 2004 and 2011, for his work on The Duplex.
  - Newspaper Panel for 2010, for his work of Flying McCoys
