= Manfred Sams =

Austrian politician (born 1972)

Member of the National Council
- Incumbent
- Assumed office 24 October 2024
- Constituency: Hausruckviertel

Personal details
- Born: 10 February 1972 (age 54)
- Party: Social Democratic Party

Manfred Sams (born 10 February 1972) is an Austrian politician of the Social Democratic Party serving as a member of the National Council since 2024. He has served as chairman of the ASKÖ in Wels since 2011.
