= The Duplex =

American comic strip by Glenn McCoy

- Author(s): Glenn McCoy
- Website: www.gocomics.com/duplex
- Launch date: September 7, 1993; 31 years ago
- Syndicate(s): Universal Press Syndicate/Universal Uclick/Andrews McMeel Syndication
- Publisher(s): Andrews McMeel Publishing
- Genre(s): Humor

The Duplex is a comic strip by Glenn McCoy and now his brother Gary McCoy, syndicated by Universal Press Syndicate/Universal Uclick/Andrews McMeel Syndication since April 1993.

The Duplex has been published as a syndicated daily newspaper comic strip and on the internet. Although designed for American readers, The Duplex enjoys popularity outside the USA.

== Characters ==
The characters of The Duplex include:

- Eno L. Camino, the main character
- Fang, Eno's dog and best friend
- Gina, Eno's and Fang's neighbor
- Mitzi, Gina's poodle and Fang's object of affection
- Elvin, Eno's neighbor and friend

== Awards ==
In 2005, the National Cartoonists Society gave The Duplex the award for 2004's best Newspaper Comic Strip.

== Books ==
Two collections of strips have been published:

- Mccoy, Glenn (1998). The Duplex. Andrews McMeel Publishing. ISBN 978-0836251852.
- Mccoy, Glenn (2006). Bad Habits. Andrews McMeel Publishing. ISBN 978-0740761959.
