= Steve Kelley (cartoonist) =

American cartoonist

Steve Kelley of the Pittsburgh Post-Gazette is a syndicated editorial cartoonist, comic strip creator, comedian, and writer. He has previously served as staff political cartoonist for The San Diego Union / The San Diego Union-Tribune and The New Orleans Times-Picayune. He began work at the Post-Gazette in November 2018.

Kelley is co-creator and writer of the award-winning syndicated comic strip Dustin which King Features Syndicate distributes to more than 370 newspaper clients and websites.

Born in Richmond, Virginia, Kelley graduated from the Collegiate School, and received an undergraduate degree in English from Dartmouth College in 1981, where he drew cartoons for both the Daily Dartmouth and The Dartmouth Review.

== Career ==
Kelley began his journalism career in 1981 at the San Diego Union Tribune. After two decades, he moved to the New Orleans Times-Picayune in 2002 following an incident at the Union Tribune involving a cartoon he had submitted to his editors, depicting two teenagers wearing baggy low-cut pants that did not completely cover their buttocks.

Kelley and former Florida Today editorial cartoonist Jeff Parker, who also worked on Mother Goose and Grimm and Blondie in the past, created and produce the comic strip Dustin, which debuted in early 2010. The strip won the National Cartoonists Society Reuben Award for Best Newspaper Comic Strip in 2010 and 2017.

On June 12, 2012, it was reported that Kelley's position at The Times-Picayune would be terminated as part of a large-scale staff reduction at the paper that included terminations for approximately half of the newsroom staff. Kelley said he expected to continue with Dustin while looking for a new newspaper position.

Kelley was hired by the Pittsburgh Post-Gazette in 2018 to replace cartoonist Rob Rogers, who had been fired after conflicts with the paper's ownership, a decision some regarded as retaliation for Rogers' criticisms of U.S. President Donald Trump.

Early in his career, Kelley began writing and performing comedy at the Improv and The Comedy Store in San Diego a pursuit that led to seven appearances on The Tonight Show, and work as the opening act in major venues for numerous performers including The Gatlin Brothers, Lou Rawls, Dolly Parton, Reba McEntire, and Bernadette Peters. Kelley performed in showrooms at The Desert Inn and The Riviera in Las Vegas, Harrah's in Reno, Nevada, Trump Plaza in Atlantic City and Carnegie Hall in New York City.

== Awards ==
Kelley won the 2021 National Headliner Award for a portfolio of cartoons on the Coronavirus pandemic. He was a finalist for The Pulitzer Prize in the editorial cartooning category in 1999. His cartoons have also won the 2001 National Headliner Award, the Best of The West competition, the Los Angeles Press Club award, and six first place California Newspaper Publishers Association awards. He won the 2007 National Journalism Awards for Editorial Cartooning. He served as a 2008 Montgomery Fellow at Dartmouth College and was editor of Pelican Publishing's 2013 edition of Best Editorial Cartoons of the Year.
