= W. B. Park =

American cartoonist (1936–2021)

William Bryan Park (June 12, 1936 – January 2, 2021) was an international cartoonist and illustrator.

== Biography ==
Park had over 60 cartoons published in The New Yorker magazine, and wrote numerous short-short stories for them which ran on their website. Park was phased out of The New Yorker in 1997 when Bob Mankoff became cartoon editor. Park was represented by The New Yorker on the rights and sales of his New Yorker cartoons in the United States.

Park was represented in the UK by CartoonStock. He also worked with clients directly from his studio in Florida. In 1989 he created a humor panel, Off the Leash, which was syndicated and distributed worldwide by United Feature Syndicate of United Media until 1999.

For over 30 years he was artist in residence of Litigation Journal of The American Bar Association, and continued to do work for various law firms and individual lawyers throughout the United States.

As a journalist, he traveled, wrote and illustrated many articles, including a piece based on his trip to Cuba weeks after the overthrow of Fulgencio Batista by Fidel Castro in January, 1959 (Orlando Sentinel), "The Experimental Aircraft Show at Oshkosh," and "Learning to Fly" (Flying Magazine), "Snow Job," a piece on skiing a glacier in Austria (Travel & Leisure), "The Cruise Ship Syndrome" (The New York Times), and "The Motor Races at Limerock." His fables ran in Look, Intellectual Digest, Status, and The Floridian, the magazine of The St. Petersburg Times.

Park also did art for advertising agencies and directly for clients. His fine art has been exhibited in shows in New York City, Washington, D. C., and in various U.S. cities as well as Japan, the UK, and other nations.

He wrote, illustrated, and published City Heat, a Collection of Stories and Poems. He wrote and illustrated six children's books: The Pig in the Floppy Black Hat and Jonathan's Friends, published by G. P. Putnam's Sons, Charlie-Bob's Fan published by Harcourt Brace Jovanovich, Who's Sick! published by Houghton-Mifflin, The Costume Party and Bakery Business published by Little, Brown and Company.

Park was an amateur chess player, and won a few awards, including first place in the Under 1200 Category of the United States Open of 1997. He lived in Florida with his wife Eva, and two cats.

== Awards ==
Park received the National Cartoonist Society Advertising Illustration Award in 1991, and their Greeting Card Award in 1993. He also received the Silver Funnybone Award from The New York Society of Illustrators.
