= Jerry Robinson =

American comic book artist (1922–2011)

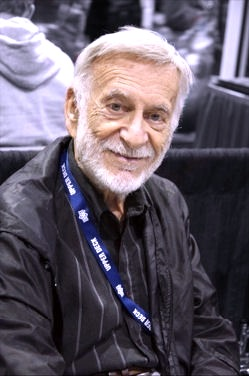
- Robinson at the 2008 San Diego Comic-Con.
- Born: Sherrill David Robinson; January 1, 1922 Trenton, New Jersey, U.S.
- Died: December 7, 2011 (aged 89) Staten Island, New York, U.S.
- Areas: Penciller, Inker, Letterer
- Notable works: Batman; Robin; Joker
- Awards: National Cartoonists Society Award: Comic Book Division (1956); Newspaper Panel Cartoon (1963); Special Features Award (1965); Milton Caniff Lifetime Achievement Award (2000)

Sherrill David "Jerry" Robinson (January 1, 1922 – December 7, 2011) was an American comic book artist known for his work on DC Comics' Batman line of comics during the 1940s. He is best known as the co-creator of Robin and the Joker and for his work on behalf of creators' rights.

He was inducted into the Comic Book Hall of Fame in 2004, and posthumously inducted into the Harvey Awards Hall of Fame in 2026.

== Early life ==
Jerry Robinson was born the youngest of five children in Trenton, New Jersey. His mother Mae was a bookkeeper born in Lower Manhattan. His father Benjamin Robinson was an entrepreneur who emigrated from Western Russia, near the Baltic states, in 1895. The couple opened the first theater in Trenton. Ben Robinson immigrated to the United States to avoid conscription in the Russian Empire, which would have lasted 25 years, and antisemitism in Russia. He was of Jewish background.

He attended Columbia University for 2.5 years before leaving to focus on comics.

== Career ==
=== 1939–1943 ===
Robinson was a 17-year-old journalism student at Columbia University in 1939 when he was discovered by Batman co-creator Bob Kane, who hired him to work on that fledgling comic as an inker and letterer. Kane, with writer Bill Finger, had shortly before created the character Batman for National Comics, the future DC Comics. Robinson rented a room from a family in The Bronx near Kane's family's Grand Concourse apartment, where Kane used his bedroom as an art studio. He started as a letterer and a background inker, shortly graduating to inking secondary figures. Within a year, he became Batman's primary inker, with George Roussos inking backgrounds. Batman quickly became a hit character, and Kane rented space for Robinson and Roussos in Times Square's Times Tower. In addition to Batman, Robinson and Roussos did inks and backgrounds on Target and the Targeteers for Novelty Press. Roussos recounted of his collaboration with Robinson:

It was hard to make the deadlines, because Jerry was a heavy sleeper. I used to have to go to the Bronx to get him to come to work. I'd go and wake him up 2 o'clock in the afternoon so we could work all night. ... We were committed to do about 13 pages a week. Jerry was always behind - he was always whiting out things and re-inking them. Bob's stuff was so sketchy, Jerry had to do a lot of work.

Approximately a year and a half after Robinson, Roussos, and Finger were hired by Kane, National Comics lured them away, making them company staffers. Roussos has claimed that their work on Target and the Targeteers made the series look "almost identical to Kane's Batman", and National hired them as staffers because they saw that it had become a significant competition for Batman. Robinson recalled working in the bullpen at the company's 480 Lexington Avenue office, alongside Superman creators Jerry Siegel and Joe Shuster, as well as Jack Kirby, Fred Ray, and Mort Meskin, "one of my best friends, who[m] I brought up from MLJ".

By early 1940, Kane and Finger discussed adding a sidekick. Robinson suggested the name "Robin" after Robin Hood books he had read during boyhood, saying (in a 2005 interview) that he was inspired by one book's N.C. Wyeth illustrations. The new character, orphaned circus performer Dick Grayson, came to live with Bruce Wayne (Batman) as his young ward in Detective Comics #38 (April 1940). Robin would inspire many similar sidekicks throughout the remainder of the Golden Age of Comic Books.

Batman's nemesis, the Joker, was introduced around the same time, in Batman #1 (Spring 1940). Though Kane claimed he and writer Bill Finger came up with the idea for the Joker, most comic historians credit Robinson for the iconic villain, modelled after Conrad Veidt in the 1928 film The Man Who Laughs. Credit for that character's creation, however, is disputed. Robinson has said he created the character. Kane's position was that:

Bill Finger and I created the Joker. Bill was the writer. Jerry Robinson came to me with a playing card of the Joker. That's the way I sum it up. [The Joker] looks like Conrad Veidt — you know, the actor in The Man Who Laughs [the 1928 film based on the novel] by Victor Hugo ... Bill Finger had a book with a photograph of Conrad Veidt and showed it to me and said, 'Here's the Joker.' Jerry Robinson had absolutely nothing to do with it. But he'll always say he created it till he dies. He brought in a playing card, which we used for a couple of issues for him [the Joker] to use as his playing card.

Robinson, whose original Joker playing card was on public display in the exhibition "Masters of American Comics" at the Jewish Museum in New York City, New York, from September 16, 2006 to January 28, 2007, and the William Breman Jewish Heritage Museum in Atlanta, Georgia from October 24, 2004 to August 28, 2005, has countered that:

Bill Finger knew of Conrad Veidt because Bill had been to a lot of the foreign films. Veidt ... had this clown makeup with the frozen smile on his face. When Bill saw the first drawing of the Joker, he said, 'That reminds me of Conrad Veidt in The Man Who Laughs.' He said he would bring in some shots of that movie to show me. That's how that came about. I think in Bill's mind, he fleshed out the concept of the character.

Finger provided his own account in 1966:

I got a call from Bob Kane. ... He had a new villain. When I arrived he was holding a playing card. Apparently Jerry Robinson or Bob, I don't recall who, looked at the card and they had an idea for a character ... the Joker. Bob made a rough sketch of it. At first it didn't look much like the Joker. It looked more like a clown. But I remembered that Grosset & Dunlap formerly issued very cheap editions of classics by Alexandre Dumas and Victor Hugo ... The volume I had was The Man Who Laughs — his face had been permanently operated on so that he will always have this perpetual grin. And it looked absolutely weird. I cut the picture out of the book and gave it to Bob, who drew the profile and gave it a more sinister aspect. Then he worked on the face; made him look a little clown-like, which accounted for his white face, red lips, green hair. And that was the Joker!

Robinson was also a key force in the creation of Bruce Wayne's butler, Alfred Pennyworth, and the villain Two-Face.

In 1943, when Kane left the Batman comic books to focus on penciling the daily Batman newspaper comic strip, Robinson took over the full penciling, along with others such as Dick Sprang. Only Kane's name appeared on the strip.

=== 1944–2007 ===
From 1944 to 1946, Robinson and his friend Meskin formed a studio which produced material for the short-lived Spark Publications (Atoman, for example). Robinson worked on numerous other characters for several publishers, at one point doing freelance illustrations for a textbook publisher. After leaving superhero comics, he became a newspaper cartoonist and drew the science fiction strip Jet Scott, which was written by Sheldon Stark and ran from 1953 to 1955,. In 1959-1961 he was the primary artist on Dell Comics' Bat Masterson 9-issue comic book based on the television series, mostly scripted by Gaylord DuBois. He created True Classroom Flubs and Fluffs, which ran during the 1960s in the New York Sunday News (later incorporated into the Daily News). Robinson also did a political satire cartoon panel feature, Still Life which began national syndication on June 3, 1963.

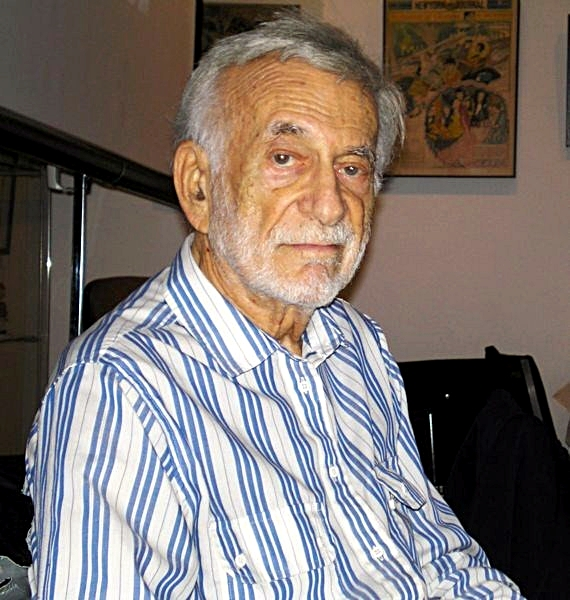
Robinson in New York City in 2006

Robinson never saw himself only as a comic-book artist. In the 1950s, he started drawing cover illustrations for Playbill and tried his hand at political sketches, producing what he considered his best work: "I did 32 years of political cartoons, one every day for six days a week. That body of work is the one I'm proudest of. While my time on Batman was important and exciting and notable considering the characters that came out of it, it was really just the start of my life."

Robinson was president of the National Cartoonists Society from 1967 to 1969 and served a two-year term as president of the Association of American Editorial Cartoonists starting in 1973.

During the mid-1970s, Robinson was a crucial supporter of Jerry Siegel and Joe Shuster in their long struggle with DC Comics to win full recognition and compensation as the creators of Superman. With comics artist and rights advocate Neal Adams, Robinson organized key support around Siegel and Shuster, to whom DC, in December 1975, granted lifetime stipends and a credit in all broadcast and published Superman works. In 1978, he founded CartoonArts International, which as of 2010 has more than 550 artists from over 75 countries.

During 1999, Robinson created an original manga series, Astra, with the help of manga artist Shojin Tanaka and Ken-ichi Oishi. This was later on released in English through Central Park Media by their manga line CPM Manga as a comic book miniseries and then a trade paperback.

On May 26, 2007, DC Comics announced that Robinson had been hired by the company as a "creative consultant". The press release accompanying this announcement did not describe his duties or responsibilities.

Robinson was among the interview subjects in Superheroes: A Never-Ending Battle, a three-hour documentary narrated by Liev Schreiber that premiered posthumously on PBS in October 2013.

=== Death ===
Robinson died in his sleep at age 89 on the afternoon of December 7, 2011 in Staten Island. His survivors were his wife, Gro (née Bagn) and two children.

== Books ==
In 1974, Robinson wrote The Comics, a comprehensive study of the history of newspaper comic strips.

His biography was published in 2010, titled: Jerry Robinson: Ambassador of Comics.

== Awards ==
Robinson won the National Cartoonists Society Award for the Comic Book Division in 1956, their 1963 Newspaper Panel Cartoon Award for Still Life, their 1965 Special Features Award for Flubs and Fluffs and their Milton Caniff Lifetime Achievement Award in 2000. Robinson was inducted into the Comic Book Hall of Fame in 2004. Robinson received the Sparky Award for lifetime achievement from the Cartoon Art Museum at the 2011 San Diego Comic-Con. He received the Inkpot Award at the 1989 Comic Con.

On October 9, 2026, at the 38th Harvey Awards ceremony, Robinson was one of a group of creators associated with Batman, who along with Frank Miller, Klaus Janson, David Mazzucchelli, Dick Sprang and former DC Comics president and publisher Jenette Kahn, was inducted into the Harvey Awards Hall of Fame.
