= The Pajama Diaries =

American comic strip by Terri Libenson

- Author: Terri Libenson
- Current status/schedule: Concluded
- Launch date: March 27, 2006
- End date: January 4, 2020
- Syndicate(s): King Features Syndicate
- Genre(s): Humor, gag-a-day

The Pajama Diaries is a syndicated comic strip created in 2006 by Terri Libenson, a Reuben Award-winning artist who has also done work for American Greetings. It is narrated by Jill Kaplan, a wife of a loving husband and working mom of two young girls in a Jewish family somewhere in Ohio done in real-time fashion, where the characters age with the progressive years of the series and deals with varying topics from the everyday silliness and dramas of life to social commentary. The Pajama Diaries is carried by King Features Syndicate. On December 10, 2019, Libenson announced that she would be ending the strip to focus on her career as a children's book author; the final strip was published on January 4, 2020.

== Main characters ==
- Jill Kaplan: The modern, multitasking mother of two teenaged daughters and wife of Rob Kaplan. She is descended from Sephardi Jews. Jill works at home as a web designer, and often has to balance her job with her home life. She is an emotional type and a bit of a self-confessed control freak, especially when it comes to her daughters. Every now and then, her teenaged subconscious voice of reason, or in certain cases, unreason, '80s Jill, appears in the bathroom mirror to voice her opinions. Often, '80s Jill brings along old friends from days gone by. She also has an older brother by five years, Brian, introduced in the November 22, 2014 strip; that lives out of state and married with two teenaged children, a son and daughter that look a bit like Jill.
- Rob Kaplan: Jill's easy-going, yet bluntly honest husband of Russian Jewish background, father to daughters Amy and Jess, and devoted to his family. He is a semi-independent IT contractor who works outside of home. If he has a fault, it is that he has a constant libido that sometimes Jill finds irritating.
- Amy Kaplan: The elder daughter of Rob and Jill. She's currently attending a college in Waverly City and learning to navigate dorm life, exams and midnight cafeteria offerings. In the spring of 2013 she completed her bat mitzvah. She dated Lisa Day's eldest son, Danny, during their high school years. She is set on being athletic, independent and outdoing her sister, Jess.
- Jess Kaplan: Amy's sweet-natured bookworm and fashion-conscious younger sister by two years who is currently in high school. She also had her bat mitzvah, on October 3, 2015.

== Other characters ==
- Lisa Day: Jill's best friend and the mother of three children: sons Danny and Noah, and a third one yet to be identified. Early in the strip two of the children were named Matthew and Katie. Lisa has a struggling marriage and recently separated from her husband. In the fall of 2013, Lisa studied to be a teacher and was a student teaching in Jess's junior high school.
- Nanci Raymond: Jill's friend who is an assertive and ambitious mother of teenaged twins. Her current second marriage is to David, the elderly father of a former beau. In July 2014, she gave birth to her child with David, a son named Ben.
- Grandma Sophie "Kvetchy" Tetelbaum: (deceased) Rob's old-fashioned Polish grandmother, who lived into her 90s, enjoyed reminding Jill about the virtues of being the ideal homemaker. Jill found these reminders annoying. Grandma Sophie told her great-grandchildren of leaving Poland when she was a little girl before World War II while the remainder of her family was murdered in the Holocaust and every Yom Hashoah she lit a candle for them in their memory. She was afflicted with Alzheimer's disease and resided in a seniors home until her death on January 24, 2018, effectively writing her out of the strip.
- "Perfectville": The "perfect" next door neighbours across the street from the Kaplans. They do everything right, seemingly without effort, from their pristine lawn to their always appropriate housewarming gifts. Perfectville refers mainly to the overachieving, African-American mother (real name is yet unknown). Despite her friendliness and well-meaning advice, Jill is both envious and amazed by her neighbour's ability to do it all and to do no wrong. In helping Jill to prepare for Amy's bat mitzvah party, Perfectville revealed she was once a CEO for an advertising agency until her firstborn came and she decided to give up the working world for motherhood, plus that she got fired for blowing a $2-million account of one of her former firm's clients and runs her own party-planning business.
- Judy (a.k.a. Jill's Mother): Jill's widowed retiree mother residing in Florida with her live-in boyfriend, Harv at a retirement community. She often complains of the ailments related to old age to Jill with grotesque details.
- Deb Lowell: Another friend of Jill and working mother. Was part of her circle of friends early in the strip, but has not been seen since.
- Harper: A bachelor friend of Rob's who was looking to settle down. Was part of the Kaplans' circle of friends earlier in the strip, but has not been seen since.

== Collections ==
There are three books containing collections of The Pajama Diaries strips, including bonus strips. They are currently published by TJ Studios.

- The Pajama Diaries: Déjà To-Do! (2011) ISBN 978-0983327202
- The Pajama Diaries: Having It All...and No Time to Do It (2013) ISBN 978-0983327233
- The Pajama Diaries: Bat-Zilla (2013) ISBN 978-0983327264
