= Chon Day =

American cartoonist

Chauncey Addison "Chon" Day (April 6, 1907 – Jan 1, 2000) was an American cartoonist whose cartoons appeared in The Saturday Evening Post, The New Yorker and other magazines.

Born in Chatham, New Jersey, Day attended Lehigh University in 1926, where he drew for the college's humor magazine, The Burr. He left Lehigh after one year and in 1929 enrolled at New York City's Art Students League, where he studied under Boardman Robinson, George Bridgman and John Sloan. That same year his cartoons were first published in national magazines.

== Brother Sebastian ==
Day's cartoon series Brother Sebastian began in 1954 in the magazine Look, where it ran for years. These cartoons were collected in several Doubleday books, Brother Sebastian (1957), Brother Sebastian Carries On (1959), and Brother Sebastian at Large (1961), reprinted in paperback by Pocket Books.

Day described his character in the introduction to Brother Sebastian at Large:

It is a pleasure to bring you a new book of our gentle, imperturbable monk, Brother Sebastian. Now seven years old, he still retains the qualities with which he was born—his hearty appetite for fun (and his large waistline); his love for children, dogs, and underdogs; his tendency to be the "quiet type"; his good-humored but faithful dedication. His glasses are for neither nearsightedness nor farsightedness but are precisely fitted for impish antics.

== Awards ==
Day received the National Cartoonists Society Gag Cartoon Award for 1956, 1962, and 1970, plus their Special Features Award for Brother Sebastian in 1969.

Day died in 2000, according to The Saturday Evening Post (May 2000), where he had been their "longest running cartoonist" for more than half a century.
