= Jeff Parker (editorial cartoonist) =

American cartoonist

Jeff Parker has been an editorial cartoonist for Florida Today, which serves Florida's Space Coast, since 1992. He also assists Pulitzer Prize–winning cartoonist Mike Peters (cartoonist) with his comic strip, Mother Goose & Grimm and worked with Denis Lebrun on the daily Blondie comic strip from 1996 until 2005. With New Orleans Times-Picayune editorial cartoonist Steve Kelley, Parker produces the strip Dustin, centered on an unemployed 23-year-old living with his parents. Dustin was launched in papers nationwide in early 2010. Parker's work generally mocks conservatism.

Parker's work has been recognized with awards from Gannett News Service, Florida Society of Newspaper Editors, the Society of Professional Journalists, and the Florida Press Association. In 2004, he was awarded the National Cartoonists Society's Reuben Division Award for Editorial Cartooning after three prior nominations.

His cartoons are distributed by Cagle Cartoons syndicate to hundreds of news outlets, regularly appearing in USA TODAY, Newsweek, TIME, The Washington Post, Le Monde, Courrier International, and The New York Times, and on CNN and Fox News.
