= Miel Prudencio Ma =

Filipino cartoonist and illustrator

- Born: Philippines
- Area: Editorial cartoonist
- Pseudonyms: Miel; Dengcoy Miel
- Awards: National Cartoonist Society Newspaper Illustration Award, 2001

Miel Prudencio Ma (also known as Miel or Dengcoy Miel) is a Filipino cartoonist and illustrator. He received the National Cartoonist Society Newspaper Illustration Award of 2001.

Miel's work has been syndicated by the United Feature Syndicate/WittyWorld beginning in 1986, and lately by The New York Times Syndicate (NYTS)/Cartoonists and Writers Syndicate (CWS). His cartoons can also be found in Daryl Cagle's Professional Cartoonists Index website. His cartoons have been published in newspapers such as The International Herald Tribune, Newsweek, Asiaweek, World & I, Japan Times, The New York Times, The Washington Post, The South China Morning Post and World Press Review, among others.

Miel has a master's degree in design (MDes) from the University of New South Wales (UNSW, Sydney).

Formerly the editorial cartoonist of the now-defunct and Ferdinand Marcos-owned Philippine Daily Express, he subsequently became chief editorial cartoonist of The Philippine Star, a broadsheet founded in the post-Marcos year 1986. In 1992, he emigrated to Singapore with his family.

Miel started his Singapore career as the assistant art editor of The Straits Times, Singapore's top English-language daily. He is now its senior executive artist.

== Works ==
=== As author ===
- Scenegapore (2012, Epigram Books) ISBN 9789810731076
- An Essential Guide to Singlish (2003, 2010, Gartbooks) ISBN 9810467087 ISBN 9789810861094
- Singatoons (2002, Landmark Books) ISBN 9813065648

=== As co-author ===
- So Singapore Toons (2008, Singapore Discovery Centre and Popular Book Co) ISBN 9789814224383

=== As illustrator ===
- An Essential Guide to Pantang!: Taboos and Superstitions of Singapore & Malaysia (2009, Gartbooks) ISBN 9789810832001
- The Midnight Tree (2008, Rainforest Kids) ISBN 9789810832001
- Lost in the Secret Garden (2007, Rainforest Kids) ISBN 9789810592141
- Secret Hoarder (2007, Rainforest Kids) ISBN 9789810579180
- Ben's Friends from the Rainforest (2006, Pixie Books) ISBN 9789810564148
- Peeping @ 2031: Celebrating Institute of Systems Science 25th Anniversary (2006, SNP Editions) OCLC 78456998
- Thinking Allowed? Politics, Fear and Change in Singapore (2004, SNP Editions) ISBN 9812480617
