= Dustin (comic strip) =

American comic strip

Dustin is a daily comic strip created by Steve Kelley, editorial cartoonist for the Pittsburgh Post-Gazette, and Jeff Parker, editorial cartoonist for Florida Today. It is carried by King Features Syndicate and debuted on January 4, 2010. Dustin won the National Cartoonists Society Reuben Award for Best Newspaper Comic Strip in 2010, and again in 2017. Focusing on the present Boomerang Generation and post-Great Recession period, it also deals with varying topics from everyday life and social commentary.

Dustin was initially planned as a collaboration between Kelley and Steve Breen, who was Kelley's successor as the staff editorial cartoonist of the San Diego Union Tribune after Kelley was fired from that position in 2001. Breen later decided not to proceed with Dustin, leading to a 2008 lawsuit by Kelley against the owners of the Union Tribune, alleging that Breen had been improperly pressured not to collaborate with Kelley; the case was dismissed in 2009, but reinstated in 2011.

At its outset Dustin was carried in more than 100 newspapers nationwide, and by October 2010 it had expanded to 300. In several papers, Dustin was the replacement strip for Cathy, which ended its run in papers on October 3, 2010.

== Characters ==
Dustin Kudlick, the title character of the comic strip. A 23-year-old college graduate who has failed to find regular employment after graduating and thus moved back home to live with his parents. He often gains temp jobs despite extreme laziness and a lack of motivation. He is frequently shown asking his agent at the temp agency for middle or upper-level management positions, despite demonstrating no vocation whatsoever and frequently being let go from his temp positions for incompetence and/or laziness. In developing relationships with women, Dustin frequently finds himself rejected or alone.

Edward "Ed" Kudlick, Dustin's father, is a successful, overweight lawyer who eats too much, especially donuts, and is annoyed with his son's situation and lack of motivation, but does not pressure Dustin to improve his situation or move out. The only thing they consistently have in common is their love of golf.

Helen Kudlick, Dustin's mother, is a radio advice talk-show host of "Here's Helen," who occasionally endures one airheaded marijuana-advocate caller named Carl with some of his crazy questions. She always keeps faith that her son will do well eventually, even though she does have a shopaholic problem, especially over shoes.

Megan Kudlick, Dustin's teenage sister, seven years younger than her brother, also resides in the house. A bit of an overachiever, she tends to insult and undercut Dustin at every possible turn. But at times they do share moments of true sibling bonding, and she sometimes encourages him to keep trying.

Simone Fontenot, the owner of TurboTemps, a one-woman employment agency. Simone provides Dustin with an unending stream of temporary job assignments, which he predictably squanders. She also supplies criticism and sarcasm that serves as a comically objective assessment of Dustin's historically poor work performance.

Kevin Fitch, Dustin's best friend, who actually works but is less ambitious and intelligent than Dustin is.

Hayden, a precocious seven-year-old kid and next-door neighbor living with his single mother who shares his wisdom that is uncharacteristic, given his age.
