= Jovan Prokopljević =

Serbian cartoonist

Jovan Prokopljević (born December 30, 1940, in Zemun; nicknamed "The Great") is a Serbian architect, cartoonist, and caricaturist. He has been awarded two Pierre awards and the First Prize for cartoons at international competitions in China, Montenegro, and Australia.

== Biography ==
Prokopljević, who currently lives in Zemun, received a bachelor's degree from the University of Belgrade Faculty of Architecture (1967) and worked as an architect. His father was a chess player, and to honor his memory after his death, Prokopljević attended a chess exhibition. At the time, cartoon art had been his hobby, but by 1992 he decided to become a professional cartoonist. He was hired by Politika in 1994 and contributed to the paper until 2010. With Zemun cartoonist Predrag Koraksić Corax and others, Prokopljević worked for the newspaper Jež. His work has appeared on magazine covers, such as Chess Life. He was awarded the First Prize, Best Cartoon category, by the Chess Journalists of America in 2004.

While Prokopljević is a chess player, he sells cartoon-like chess-themed prints of "gnomish" players at chess tournaments. He is a member of the Association of the Design Artists of Zemun, and the Cartoonist and Writers Syndicate in New York City. He has participated in 45 solo exhibitions and over 400 group exhibits. He earned numerous national and international prizes and awards for his cartoon work, including the Pierre Prize laureate (1994); Second Prize in Kragujevac, (1995); Special Prize, First International contest, Zemun (1996); Special Prize, International Caricature Contest, Tokyo (1996); First Prize, International Contest, Belgrade (1997); Major Special prize, International Contest, Kruševac, Yugoslavia. More recently, his work received the Recognition award, Zemun International Salon of Caricature (2008); the "avord Internet" (Internet award), Guangxi Arts Institute International Cartoon Context, China (2010); Second Prize, First International Press Cartoon and Humor Contest, Virton, Belgium (2011); and the First Prize, Cyprus International Cartoon Contest (2012). With Aleksandar Matanović, Prokopljević's Chess miniatures & caricatures: thirty short games and thirty caricatures was published in 2000; with Aleksandar Naftaljevič Koblenc, Blagoje Šestović, and Mihail Nehemjevič Talj, Prokopljević published Lekcije šahovske strategije in 2005.
