= Charles Saxon =

American cartoonist (1920–1988)

- Born: Charles David Isaacson; November 13, 1920; Brooklyn, New York City, U.S.
- Died: December 6, 1988 (aged 68); Stamford, Connecticut, U.S.
- Education: Columbia University (B.A.)
- Occupation: Cartoonist
- Known for: Cartoons for The New Yorker and various advertisements
- Spouse(s): Nancy Lee Saxon, née Rogers
- Children: 3
- Awards: Reuben Award (1980)

Charles David Saxon (November 13, 1920 – December 6, 1988) was an American cartoonist known for his work for The New Yorker.

== Early life ==
Saxon was born Charles David Isaacson in Brooklyn; both his parents were musicians, and his great-uncle had been court violinist to the British Queen Victoria.

== Career and education ==
He played drums and worked in jazz bands while at Columbia University, which he entered at 15; he became editor of its humor magazine, Jester.

After earning his B.A. he worked at Dell Publishing as editor of the satire magazine Ballyhoo before serving as a bomber pilot in the Army Air Corps during World War II, flying 40 missions over Germany. After the war he rejoined Dell, left to edit This Week for a year, and returned to edit Modern Screen. He also began drawing cartoons on weekends, selling them to The Saturday Evening Post. His first appearance in The New Yorker was a spot illustration in 1943; after becoming a full-time cartoonist in 1955, he joined their staff in 1956 and over more than 30 years drew 92 covers and more than 700 cartoons for the magazine. Much of his New Yorker work gently pokes fun at the privileged denizens of prosperous suburbs; unusually, he wrote his own words, often highlighting clichés, as in an image of well-fed executives in a boardroom, the chairman stating "Of course, honesty is one of the better policies." After The New Yorker was taken over and William Shawn left the editorship, his work was rarely published there. He published three collections of his cartoons for the magazine: Oh, Happy, Happy, Happy! (1960), One Man's Fancy (1970), and Honesty Is One of the "Better" Policies: Saxon's World of Business (1984).

Saxon also drew numerous ads, including for Chivas Regal, American Airlines, Bankers Trust, IBM, and Xerox. As his obituary in The New York Times noted, "So ubiquitous was his advertising work in the late 1970s that one edition of The Wall Street Journal featured ads by Mr. Saxon for three different companies."

Saxon had one-man shows at the Nicholls Gallery. He was awarded a gold medal by the Art Directors Club of New York in 1963 and an honorary doctorate by Hamilton College in 1972. He received the National Cartoonist Society Advertising Award for 1977, and their Gag Cartoon Award for 1980, 1986, and 1987. For his work with The New Yorker, he received their Reuben Award for 1980.

== Personal life ==
He was married to Nancy Lee Saxon, née Rogers, a sculptor and portraitist, and illustrated her children's books; they had three children.

== Death ==
Saxon died of heart failure on December 6, 1988, at St. Joseph Medical Center in Stamford, Connecticut. He spoke his last words to paramedics after suffering a heart attack at home: "I guess I'd better die; I just broke our best lamp."
