= Stane Jagodič =

Slovenian artist

Stane Jagodič (born 15 June 1943) is a Slovenian painter, photographer, caricaturist, and author. He is known for works involving social criticism. He is especially known for his montages, assemblages, and collages.

== Biography ==
Jagodič was born in Celje and spent his youth in various places near Šmarje pri Jelšah. In 1964, he finished the School of Design and graduated from the Academy of Fine Arts in Ljubljana in 1970. In the early 1970s, he began working on photocollages, abstract painting, and different newly invented techniques, for example spraygrams and artistic use of X-rays. He was a member of the Union of Slovene Fine Arts Associations and of the Association of Slovenian Designers, the Cartoonists & Writers Syndicate in New York and an external collaborator of the international journal Graphic Design, Seoul (South Korea). He was a co-founder of the June Group (Slovene: Grupa Junij), an international art movement of the 1970s, the creator of the June International Art Collection and the initiator and leader of the satire triennal Aritas-Satire (1995–2001). He has held over fifty solo exhibitions and has taken part in more than 200 group shows, as well as numerous art juries at home and abroad.

In 1989, his monograph was published. 1993 saw the issue of his catalogue Častilec svetlobe, srebra in rje ("The Worshipper of Light, Silver, and Rust"), and in 2004, his memoirs, entitled Orbis Artis: nemirno in kreativno ("Orbis Artis: Restless and Creative"), 1943–2004) were published, which include more than 800 pages. He has received more than 50 awards and prizes for his creative work, mostly abroad.
