= Brother Sebastian =

American comic strip by Chon Day

Brother Sebastian was an American pantomime gag cartoon series, created by Chon Day. It ran from 1954 until 1971 in Look. The cartoons center on a spectacled Roman Catholic monk. All cartoons are one-panel and although occasionally signs are used there is no use of dialogue, making it a classic example of a pantomime comic.

== Books ==
These cartoons were collected in several Doubleday books, Brother Sebastian, Brother Sebastian Carries On and Brother Sebastian at Large (1961), reprinted in paperback by Pocket Books.

Day received the National Cartoonists Society's Special Features Award for 1969 for his work on Brother Sebastian cartoons.
