= The Born Loser =

American comic strip

- Author(s): Art Sansom (1965–1991); Chip Sansom (1989–present)
- Current status/schedule: Daily
- Launch date: May 10, 1965; 61 years ago
- Syndicate(s): Newspaper Enterprise Association
- Genre(s): Humor, family life, work

The Born Loser is a newspaper comic strip created by Art Sansom in 1965. His son, Chip Sansom, who started assisting on the strip in 1989, is the current artist. The strip is distributed by Newspaper Enterprise Association. The Sansoms won the 1987 National Cartoonists Society Humor Comic Strip Award and the 1990 Newspaper Comic Strip Award.

== History ==
Art Sansom created The Born Loser after spending 20 years churning out the illustrations on his syndicate's serious strips. He originally titled it The Loser, but under the urging of the syndicate, renamed it The Born Loser. The dailies started May 10, 1965 while the Sundays premiered on June 27. Initially, the strip had no recurring characters but now focuses on the Thornapple family and the few people in their lives.

== Characters ==
=== Main characters ===
Brutus Perry "Thorny" Thornapple is the born loser. He simply cannot get a break, whether it involves his job, his family, or just plain everyday life. He's rather old-fashioned, and the modern times seem to run him over. His birthday is November 29, 1951, though the May 10, 2011 edition proclaimed it to be his 46th birthday.

Gladys "Hornet" Thornapple is Brutus's wife; she is even more old fashioned than Brutus and does not seem to be very bright, especially with popular culture or technology. Taller than Brutus, with blond hair, she is rather similar to Edith "Dingbat" Bunker. She can be a bit critical of Brutus, often scolding him or getting into fights with him that he simply cannot win. Nevertheless, their relationship always seems to be intact.

Wilberforce Thornapple is the son of the Thornapple family. He's a very curious boy who looks up to his father and often turns to him for advice. He is friends with his neighbor Hurricane Hattie and enjoys baseball, but he is not very good at it. He currently wears his blond hair in a crew cut but in the 1970s, when boys and men tended to wear much longer hair, he wore his hair in sausage curls, and wore sailor-type suits with shorts, ala Little Lord Fauntleroy. His appearance looked much more boyish with the new hairstyle as his wardrobe was updated with jeans, sweatshirts, and tennis shoes.

=== Secondary characters ===
Rancid W. "Rank" Veeblefester is Brutus's boss, a rich tycoon. A very cranky, unpleasant man, he works in an office surrounded by money bags and does not seem to do any real work. He always scolds Brutus for being incompetent and seems to enjoy tormenting him. He loves to give a seemingly nice remark to Brutus to get his hopes up, and then turn it around as an insult (one example being that the only empty cubicle in the entire office belongs to Brutus). It's often a wonder how Brutus, who dubs him "Chief", manages to escape being fired by him; this implies that Veeblefester is satisfied with Brutus' work and simply enjoys terrorizing him. Even in their home lives, nothing changes (such as when Brutus wants to borrow the lawnmower and Veeblefester tells him not to take it out of the yard). His wife's name is "Lividea", a play on the word "livid"; presumably she is as unpleasant as her husband. The character's name is a variation on veeblefetzer, a word popularized in the 1950s by Harvey Kurtzman in early issues of Mad.

Ramona Gargle is Gladys's mother. A stereotypical mother-in-law, she often visits to pepper Brutus with insults and emotional anguish and criticizes Brutus over his weight. However, Brutus does occasionally gets his own jibes back at "Mother Gargle".

"Hurricane" Hattie O'Hara is the mischievous girl next door. She delights in menacing pretty much any adult she encounters, namely Brutus and her teacher.

Uncle Ted, Brutus' uncle, and thus Wilberforce's great-uncle.

== Plot ==
The Born Loser began in 1965 as a strip with no central characters that revolved around the loser theme. Gradually, it developed a stable cast of Brutus Thornapple, his wife Gladys, his mother-in-law Ramona Gargle, his boss Rancid Veeblefester, Brutus and Gladys's dim-witted son Wilberforce, and the mischievous neighbor Hurricane Hattie O'Hara.

== Development ==
On November 1, 2021, Chip Sansom took a two-month sabbatical from the daily requirements of producing the strip due to the unexpected surgery he underwent. As a result, The Born Loser panels were temporary reruns from past strips. On December 27, 2021, he returned to the daily strips. Later on in January 30, 2022, he returned to the Sunday strips.
