= Amy (comic strip) =

American comic strip

- Author: Harry Mace (1961–1964); Jack Tippit (1964–1991)
- Current status/schedule: Concluded daily
- Launch date: October 2, 1961
- End date: 1991
- Alternate name: Our Girl Amy
- Syndicate(s): Register and Tribune Syndicate (1961–1986), King Features Syndicate (1986–1991)
- Genre(s): Humor, gag cartoon

Amy (sometimes called Our Girl Amy) is an American syndicated gag cartoon centering on a young, blond girl with a pony tail. Created by Harry Mace on October 2, 1961, it was originally syndicated by the Register and Tribune Syndicate. Mace was later joined on the strip by Jack Tippit, but Mace left the strip in 1964. Tippit continued alone on the strip until it ended in 1991.

Tippit received the National Cartoonists Society Newspaper Panel Cartoon Award for the strip for 1970.
