= Jack Tippit =

American cartoonist (1923–1994)

- Born: October 19, 1923; Texas
- Died: October 14, 1994 (aged 70); Lubbock, Texas
- Education: Texas Technological College, Syracuse University
- Occupation: Cartoonist
- Known for: Amy

Jack Tippit (October 19, 1923 – October 14, 1994) was an American cartoonist whose work includes the comic strip Amy, which he produced from 1964 through 1991.

== Early life ==
Tippit was born in Texas. He graduated from Texas Technological College (now Texas Tech University) in 1947. He also attended Syracuse University, graduating magna cum laude with a BFA in 1949.

Tippit had a long career in the military, serving as a combat pilot in World War II and as a pilot, trainer, and other roles during the Korean and Vietnam conflicts. He retired from the Air Force Reserve in 1974 with the rank of colonel.

== Career ==
Tippit's cartoons appeared in a number of high-profile publications in the 1960s to 1990s, including The New Yorker, Ladies' Home Journal, Look and The Saturday Evening Post. Tippit's most notable work was on Amy, a cartoon strip created by Harry Mace in 1961 which Tippit took over in 1964 and continued until its end in 1991. He also worked on the strips Henry, Dr. Bill, and Family Flak. He was a co-founder and the first director of the Museum of Cartoon Art (now known as the National Cartoon Museum) in 1974, and served on the National Cartoonists Society Board of Governors.

== Death ==
Tippit died in Lubbock, Texas in 1994.

== Awards ==
He received the National Cartoonist Society Newspaper Panel Cartoon Award for Amy in 1970. He also received the Society's Gag Cartoon Award for 1963 and 1966.
