= Belleville News-Democrat =

Newspaper in Belleville, Illinois

- The July 27, 2009 front page of the Belleville News-Democrat
- Type: Daily newspaper
- Format: Broadsheet
- Owner(s): The McClatchy Company
- Editor: Todd Eschman
- Founded: 1858
- Headquarters: 120 South Illinois St. Belleville, IL 62220-2130; United States
- Circulation: 14,133 Daily; 40,829 Sunday (as of 2020)
- Website: bnd.com

The Belleville News-Democrat is a twice-weekly newspaper in Belleville, Illinois. Focusing on news that is local to the area of southwestern Illinois, it has been published under various names for 150 years. As of 2009, it is published by The McClatchy Company, and is based in St. Clair County, Illinois. It publishes content in print as well as online at bnd.com.

== History ==
The Belleville News-Democrat was founded in 1858 as the Weekly Democrat. In the early 1860s, it merged with the Belleville News to become the Belleville News-Democrat. It was a family-owned newspaper until 1972, when it was purchased by Capital Cities Communications. When Disney acquired Capital Cities, it briefly owned the News-Democrat until Knight Ridder acquired the newspaper in 1997. McClatchy acquired the paper in 2006 with its purchase of Knight Ridder.

Beginning Oct. 30, 2023, the paper will have its print days reduced to two a week, Wednesdays and Sundays, and be delivered by U.S Postal.

== Distinction ==
The Belleville News-Democrat has been featured on the television programs 60 Minutes, Dateline and Nightline, as an example of investigative reporting. In 2003, an article in Editor & Publisher called the News-Democrat one of "Ten newspapers that do it right" under the leadership of former publisher, Gary Berkeley, and former editor, Greg Edwards. It is also the only newspaper in Illinois or Missouri to grow net paid circulation for ten years in a row, and is a frequent winner in state and regional journalism awards.

In 2007, News-Democrat reporters Beth Hundsdorfer and George Pawlaczyk won the Robert F. Kennedy Journalism Award for "Lethal Lapses", a series investigating errors of the Illinois Department of Children and Family Services that resulted in the deaths of 53 children.

On February 13, 2020, The McClatchy Company and 54 affiliated companies filed for Chapter 11 bankruptcy protection in the United States District Court for the Southern District of New York. The company cited pension obligations and excessive debt as the primary reasons for the filing.

== Staff ==
The newspaper employs approximately 280 people, plus about 75 at its weekly ancillary papers. The newsroom staff consists of 26 reporters, 12 editors, seven copy editors, four photographers, three newsroom assistants and an editorial cartoonist, (see: Glenn McCoy).

== Other publications ==
It publishes separate editions in Madison County and St. Clair County.

The News-Democrat also publishes the following weekly papers:

- The Highland News Leader
- Tri-County Leader
- O'Fallon Progress
- Command Post (serving Scott Air Force Base)
- Legal Reporter
- Penny Saver

== Counties served ==
=== Illinois ===
- St. Clair
- Madison
- Bond
- Clinton
- Washington
- Monroe
- Marion
- Randolph
- Perry
- Jefferson

=== Missouri ===
- St. Louis
- St. Louis City
