= B. B. Sams =

American artist (born 1944)

- Born: 1944 (age 81–82) Charleston, South Carolina
- Areas: Cartoonist, Penciller

B. B. Sams (born 1944) is an American artist who has worked as an illustrator.

He was born in Charleston, South Carolina and raised in Atlanta, Georgia. He served five years as a US Naval officer and got his break through the assistance of cartoonist Johnny Sajem. He drew Mickey Mouse for Disney and currently works as a freelance cartoonist for advertising and magazines. He received the National Cartoonist Society (NCS) Advertising and Illustration Award in 1997, another nomination for that award for 2002, and the NCS Book Illustration Award for 2002. He resides in Georgia.
