= Chip Sansom =

American cartoonist, son of Art Sansom

Arthur B. "Chip" Sansom III (born July 4, 1951) is an American comic strip cartoonist.

Sansom attended Kenyon College, where he was a member of Delta Kappa Epsilon fraternity. He graduated from Case Western Reserve University in Cleveland, Ohio with a double major in business and English.

In 1977, he started to assist his father Art Sansom on the comic strip The Born Loser, which began publication in 1965. He took over The Born Loser comic strip in 1991 after his father Art Sansom died in 1991.

In addition, Chip Sansom also worked on the comic strip "Dusty Chaps" with his father Art Sansom in 1982–1983.

== Personal life ==
Sansom lives in a suburb of Cleveland, Ohio with his wife Brooke and two daughters Isabel Sansom and Brennan Sansom. Chip Sansom's artistic streak also lends itself to other areas of his life. He is the bass guitarist for the “Rockin’ Ravers,” playing the local clubs in Cleveland. Chip also supports the Ohio Literacy Network with his comics work.

== Surgery ==
In the month of November 2021, Chip Sansom has undergone surgery and The Born Loser has been in reruns at Gocomics.

== Awards ==
The duo received the National Cartoonists Society Reuben Award for best humor comic strip in 1987 and 1991.
