= Art Sansom =

American cartoonist

- Born: Arthur Baldwin Sansom Jr. September 16, 1920 East Cleveland, Ohio
- Died: July 4, 1991 (aged 70) Cleveland, Ohio
- Area: Cartoonist
- Notable works: The Born Loser
- Awards: National Cartoonists Society Reuben Award, 1987 and 1991

Arthur Baldwin Sansom Jr. (September 16, 1920 – July 4, 1991), better known as Art Sansom, was an American comic strip cartoonist who created the long-running comic strip The Born Loser.

He was born in East Cleveland, Ohio. After graduating with an art degree from Ohio Wesleyan University in 1942, Sansom worked as an engineer/draftsman for General Electric.

In addition, Art Sansom worked on the short-lived Comic Strip Dusty Chaps with his son Chip Sanson from 1982-1983.

Sansom drew the strip Chris Welkin—Planeteer, which was written by Russ Winterbotham and ran from 1952 until 1964. In 1965, he created The Born Loser for the Newspaper Enterprise Association. In the mid-1980s, he was assisted on the strip by his son Chip Sansom, who assumed responsibility for the strip upon his death.

== Awards ==
He received the National Cartoonists Society's Reuben Award for best humor comic strip in 1987 and 1991.

He is buried in Lakewood Park Cemetery in Rocky River, Ohio.

== Sources ==
- Strickler, Dave. Syndicated Comic Strips and Artists, 1924-1995: The Complete Index. Cambria, California: Comics Access, 1995. ISBN 0-9700077-0-1
