= C. F. Payne =

American caricaturist and illustrator

Chris Fox Payne is an American caricaturist and illustrator. He graduated with BFA from Miami University in Ohio in 1976 and began a freelance career in 1980.

His illustrations may be found on covers of Time, Sports Illustrated, Rolling Stone, Mad, Esquire, National Geographic, Spy; his series Our America exclusively on the back covers of Reader's Digest, and many others. He also provided the original illustrations for the first three "Molly" books in the American Girl series.

Payne did a series of postage stamps of famous singers for the United States Postal Service. He is a recipient of numerous awards for his works, including the National Cartoonist Society Magazine Illustration Award for 2002 and their Book Illustration Award for 2003.

He is among the founders of the Illustrators' Partnership of America. He is currently an instructor at Columbus College of Art and Design, as well as a visiting instructor at the Illustration Academy.
