= List of illustrators =

This is an alphabetical list of notable illustrators.

== A ==
- Salomon van Abbé – etcher, illustrator of books and magazines
- Edwin Austin Abbey – American illustrator, painter
- Elenore Abbott – American book illustrator, scenic designer
- Jacob Bates Abbott – American illustrator, wildlife painter
- Abed Abdi – Israeli Palestinian illustrator, painter, graphic designer, sculptor
- Jean Adamson – English children's writer, illustrator
- Dan Adkins – American illustrator of comic books and science-fiction magazines
- Attila Adorjany – Canadian fantasy illustrator
- Alex Akerbladh – Swedish-born British comics artist
- Constantin Alajalov – American painter, illustrator
- Maria Pascual Alberich – Spanish book illustrator
- Annette Allcock – English children's book illustrator
- Thomas B. Allen – American painter, illustrator
- Thomas Allom – English architect, illustrator
- Chris Van Allsburg – American writer, illustrator of children's books
- Yoshitaka Amano – Japanese illustrator for Vampire Hunter D
- Victor Ambrus – archaeological illustrator
- Raymond Ameijide – American illustrator, graphic designer
- Anne Anderson – Scottish children's book illustrator
- Lai Ann – Taiwanese cartoonist
- Chris Appelhans – American filmmaker and illustrator
- Honor C. Appleton – English children's book illustrator
- Cosmo Armstrong – English line-engraver
- Peter Arno – American cartoonist
- Hans Arnold – Swiss-born Swedish illustrator
- James Arnold – English rural illustrator
- Rodolfo Arotxarena – Uruguayan caricaturist
- Isabelle Arsenault - Canadian Illustrator
- Steve Augarde – English children's book illustrator
- Margaret Ayer – American writer, illustrator of books for children and adults
- Russell Ayto – English children's book illustrator

== B ==
- Ken Bald – American illustrator, comic book artist
- Roberto Baldazzini – Italian illustrator, comic book artist
- Cyrus Leroy Baldridge – American illustrator, writer, adventurer
- Jan Balet – German-American painter, graphic artist, illustrator
- Asun Balzola – Spanish illustrator, writer, translator
- Edgar Henry Banger – British comics creator
- Eulalie Minfred Banks – British-American illustrator
- Istvan Banyai – Hungarian-born American commercial illustrator, animator
- George Barbier – French illustrator
- Cicely Mary Barker – English children's book illustrator, religious artist
- Kathleen Frances Barker – English children's book illustrator, writer
- Carl Barks – American cartoonist; worked for the Disney Studios
- Angela Barrett – British illustrator
- Niko Barun – Croatian cartoonist, illustrator
- Graeme Base – Australian writer and illustrator of children's books
- Gary Baseman – American cartoonist, illustrator, painter, designer, animator
- Johanna Basford – Scottish illustrator
- Rudi Bass – Austrian-born American graphic artist, illustrator, writer
- Richard Bassford – American illustrator for advertising and comic books
- John Batchelor – English technical illustrator
- Vincent Batignole – French comic book artist
- John Dickson Batten – British painter, book illustrator, printmaker
- John Bauer – Swedish illustrator concerned with mythology
- Pauline Baynes – English book illustrator
- S.G. Hulme Beaman – English illustrator, writer
- Aubrey Beardsley – English illustrator, writer
- Julie Bell – American illustrator
- Ludwig Bemelmans – American illustrator; known for Madeline children's books
- Earle K. Bergey – American illustrator
- Jon Berkeley – Dublin-born illustrator and children's writer
- Louisa Bertman – American illustrator, animator, visual narrative artist specializing in social and political advocacy
- Elsa Beskow – Swedish writer and illustrator of children's books
- Rupert Besley – British illustrator
- David Biedrzycki – American illustrator and writer of children's books
- Alessandro Biffignandi – Italian illustrator
- Ivan Bilibin – Russian illustrator, stage designer
- Guy Billout – French illustrator
- Charles Binger – known for science-fiction and hard-boiled book covers
- Ned Bittinger – American portrait painter, illustrator
- Mary Blair – American artist, animator, designer
- Quentin Blake – British; known for illustrating books by Roald Dahl
- Ivan Blinov – Russian calligrapher
- Cheeming Boey – Malaysian artist
- Hannes Bok – American artist and illustrator
- Enoch Bolles – American painter of pin-up art
- Chesley Bonestell – American painter, designer, illustrator
- Melinda Bordelon – American painter, illustrator
- Tom Bouden – Belgian artist
- Anna Boudová Suchardová
- Eleanor Vere Boyle – illustrator of children's books
- Syd Brak – London-based illustrator
- Anna Brandoli – Italian comic book artist
- Kaare Bratung – Norwegian illustrator, comic artist
- Lynn Breeze – British illustrator, writer
- Molly Brett – English illustrator and children's writer
- Rae Bridgman – Canadian anthropologist, writer, artist
- Raymond Briggs – English illustrator, cartoonist, graphic novelist
- Pierre Brissaud – French Art Deco illustrator, painter, engraver
- Steve Brodner – American satirical illustrator, caricaturist
- Gerald Brom – American gothic-fantasy illustrator
- Jason Brooks – illustrator, writer
- Peter Brown (illustrator) - American illustrator
- Gordon Browne – English illustrator
- Hablot Knight Browne – English illustrator
- Margaret Brundage – American illustrator, painter
- René Bull – British illustrator, photographer
- Nancy Ekholm Burkert – American art illustrator
- Mark Burrier – American cartoonist, illustrator
- Priscilla Susan Bury – English botanist, illustrator
- Sergio Burzi – Italian painter, illustrator
- Matt Busch – American illustrator, filmmaker
- Mitch Butler – illustrator, television personality

== C ==
- Randolph Caldecott - British artist and illustrator
- Felicity Campbell – British painter, illustrator
- Aldo Capitanio – Italian comic book artist
- Fernando Carcupino – Italian illustrator, painter, comic book artist
- Edd Cartier – American pulp-magazine illustrator
- Chao Yat – Chinese (Hong Kong) comics artist
- Glenn Chadbourne – American artist
- Watson Charlton – British illustrator of children's books
- Earle D. Chesney – American cartoonist
- Lauren Child – English children's writer and illustrator
- Richard Chopping – British illustrator, writer
- Howard Chandler Christy – American illustrator
- Edgar Church – American artist, comics collector
- Fabio Civitelli – Italian comic artist
- Alan M. Clark – American illustrator
- Harry Clarke – Irish stained-glass artist, book illustrator
- John Cecil Clay – American illustrator
- John Clymer – American painter, illustrator
- Alan E. Cober
- Ted CoConis – American painter, illustrator
- Anthony Colbert – British illustrator, painter
- Hedvig Collin – Danish illustrator, painter
- Coop – American hot-rod artist
- Frank Cadogan Cowper – British artist
- Kinuko Y. Craft – Japanese-born American painter, illustrator, fantasy artist
- Reed Crandall – American illustrator, penciller of comic books and magazines
- Donald Crews – American illustrator and writer of children's picture books
- Max Crivello – Italian illustrator, cartoonist
- Robert Crumb – American cartoonist
- Thelma Cudlipp – American book illustrator
- Stacy Curtis – American cartoonist, illustrator, printmaker

== D ==
- Geofrey Darrow
- Harry Grant Dart
- Honoré Daumier – French printmaker, caricaturist, illustrator, painter, sculptor
- Jack Davis
- Reginald Ben Davis
- Jane Mary Dealy
- Adam Dechanel
- Jason Deeble – American writer, illustrator
- Paul Degen
- Gertrude Degenhardt
- Étienne Delessert
- Etheline E. Dell - English illustrator, painter
- John Henry Dell
- Christopher Denise
- W.W. Denslow – American illustrator
- Vince Deporter
- Peter de Sève
- Ali Dilem
- Brad Diller
- Leo and Diane Dillon
- Tony DiTerlizzi
- Irv Docktor
- Richard Staples Dodge
- Angela Dominguez
- Franco Donatelli
- Donelan
- Gustave Doré – French artist, printmaker, illustrator, comics artist, caricaturist, sculptor
- Denise Dorrance
- Ralph Waddell Douglass
- Richard Doyle
- Roger Drew
- Edmund Dulac
- Georges Dumitresco – Romanian-Swiss physician, painter, illustrator, poet
- Frederick Melville DuMond
- Harvey Dunn

== E ==
- Nicolas Eekman
- Lois Ehlert
- Edna Eicke
- Susan Einzig
- Will Elder
- David Elliot – New Zealander children's book illustrator and writer
- Craig Elliott
- Carson Ellis
- Gil Elvgren
- Ed Emberley
- Peter Emmerich
- Ed Emshwiller
- Jack Endewelt
- Mark English
- Maginel Wright Enright
- Otto Eppers
- Erté
- Dulah Marie Evans
- Ethel Fanny Everett - British painter and children's book illustrator
- Carl Eytel

== F ==
- Jules Faber
- João Fahrion
- Frances C. Fairman
- The Fan Brothers - Terry Fan and Eric Fan - American/Canadian authors and illustrators
- Cathie Felstead
- Major Felten
- Jules Férat
- Nathalie Ferlut
- Alfons Figueras
- Rod Filbrandt
- Leonard Filgate
- Virgil Finlay
- Steve Fiorilla
- James Montgomery Flagg
- Jim Flora
- René Follet
- Mary Hallock Foote
- Henry Justice Ford
- Hal Foster
- Marcia Lane Foster
- Julien Fournié
- Jane Frank
- Malcolm Fraser
- Frank Frazetta
- Kelly Freas
- Anthony Freda
- Chandra Free
- Barbara C. Freeman
- Oli Frey
- Brian Froud
- Bernie Fuchs
- Joseph Fuchs
- Thomas Fuchs
- Gyo Fujikawa
- Magdalena Rosina Funck
- Tom Funk
- Eva Furnari

== G ==
- Wanda Gág
- Dumitru Găleșanu – Romanian book illustrator, poet-philosopher
- Hector Garrido
- Carolyn Bartlett Gast – American scientific illustrator
- Zhenya Gay – American children's book illustrator
- Roman Genn
- Pencho Georgiev
- Eddie Germano
- Charles Dana Gibson
- Anne Yvonne Gilbert
- Eric Gill
- Margery Gill
- Willi Glasauer
- Milton Glaser
- Robin Preiss Glasser
- Frank Godwin
- Ted Goff
- Fabian Göranson
- Edward Gorey
- Ruth Sigrid Grafstrom
- Carlos Grangel
- Vernon Grant
- Elizabeth Shippen Green
- Kate Greenaway
- Rebecca Guay
- Shekhar Gurera – Indian editorial cartoonist, illustrator, graphic designer
- James Gurney - American painter and illustrator
- Vee Guthrie – American illustrator of children's books and cookbooks

== H ==
- Dick Hafer
- Michael Hague
- Bob Hall
- Marcellus Hall
- Baron Barrymore Halpenny
- Clifford Harper
- Jim Harris
- Steven Harris
- Ernest William Haslehust
- Catherine Haussard
- Elisabeth Haussard
- Adam Heller
- Ruth Heller
- Danny Hellman
- Brett Helquist
- Andrew Kennaway Henderson
- Joseph Morgan Henninger
- Cornelia Hesse-Honegger – Swiss scientific illustrator
- Don Hewitt
- Don Hillsman II
- Henry Hintermeister
- John Henry Hintermeister
- Walter Haskell Hinton
- Al Hirschfeld - American caricaturist and illustrator
- Jessica Hische – American lettering artist, illustrator, type designer
- Susie Hodge
- Dick Hodgins Jr.
- Rosekrans Hoffman
- William Hogarth
- Hokusai (known mononymously; born Katsushika Hokusai) – Japanese ukiyo-e artist of the Edo period; active as a painter, printmaker
- Brad Holland
- Nicole Hollander
- Holling C. Holling
- Edgar Alfred Holloway
- Winslow Homer
- Jeff Hook
- Daniel Horne
- James Horvath
- John Howe
- Mentor Huebner
- David Hughes
- Debbie Hughes
- Rian Hughes – British comic book artist, designer
- Jim Hummel
- Barry Hunau
- Robert Hunt
- Trina Schart Hyman

== I ==
- Robert Ingpen – Australian children's book illustrator
- Koji Ishikawa – Japanese children's book writer and illustrator

== J ==
- Robin Jacques – English children's book illustrator
- Al Jaffee – American cartoonist; known for his work in satirical magazine Mad
- Jago – English children's book illustrator
- Zoran Janjetov – Serbian comic artist
- Kirk Jarvinen – American illustrator
- James Jean – Taiwanese American visual artist
- Aurélien Jeanney – French illustrator, graphic designer
- Oliver Jeffers
- Alfred Garth Jones – English illustrator
- Eddie Jones – English science-fiction illustrator
- G. B. Jones – Canadian artist, filmmaker, musician
- Patrick J. Jones – Northern Irelander–born Australian-based science-fiction and fantasy painter
- Piet de Jong – English archaeological illustrator
- Federico Jordan – Mexican editorial and advertising illustrator

== K ==
- Ingrīda Kadaka
- Arja Kajermo
- Maira Kalman
- Jack Kamen
- Avi Katz
- Cosei Kawa
- Charles Keeping
- Jack Kent
- Dóra Keresztes
- Charles Kerins
- Kazu Kibuishi
- J. D. King
- Wyncie King
- Josh Kirby
- Cem Kızıltuğ
- Hilary Knight – American writer, illustrator; known for illustrating Kay Thompson's Eloise books and some of the Mrs. Piggle Wiggle books
- Lucy Knisley
- Shahar Kober
- E. L. Konigsburg – American writer and illustrator of young-adult books, including From the Mixed-Up Files of Mrs. Basil E. Frankweiler and Jennifer, Hecate, Macbeth, William McKinley and Me, Elizabeth
- Ben Krefta
- Roy Krenkel
- Andrea Kruis
- Anita Kunz – Canadian illustrator; Officer of the Order of Canada

== L ==
- Agi Lamm
- Yvette Lapointe
- Antonio Lara de Gavilán
- Philippe Lardy
- Kivi Larmola
- Abigail Larson – 21st-century American illustrator
- Ann Latham
- Paul Laune
- Rick Law
- John Lawrence
- Edward Lear
- Alan Lee
- Suzy Lee
- John Leech
- Alfred Leete
- João M. P. Lemos
- Lois Lenski – American writer and illustrator of historical and school-age books, including Strawberry Girl and Shoo-Fly Girl
- Olive Leonhardt – American cover illustrator for The Double Dealer magazine
- Cecil Mary Leslie
- Michael Leunig
- Celia Levetus
- Harris Levey – American illustrator for DC Comics
- Arnold Levin
- Thomas Noyes Lewis - English Christian illustrator
- J. C. Leyendecker
- Kenneth Norman Lilly
- Selena Lin
- Oleg Lipchenko
- Virginio Livraghi
- Andrew Loomis
- Rafael Lopez
- Félix Lorioux
- Frederick Lowenheim
- Lubov

== M ==
- Miel Prudencio Ma
- Annette Macarthur-Onslow
- David W. Mack
- Robert Maguire
- Matt Mahurin
- Gorg Mallia
- Mark Marderosian
- Marcel Marlier
- Michael Martchenko
- Antoinette Martignoni
- Emily Winfield Martin
- Felix Mas
- Fortunino Matania
- David Burroughs Mattingly
- Steve Mattsson
- Tatyana Mavrina – Russian children's book illustrator
- John Alan Maxwell
- Mercer Mayer
- James Mayhew
- Angus McBride
- Winsor McCay
- Jeff McComsey
- James E. McConnell
- Jerry McDaniel
- Jim McDermott
- Thomas McIlvaine
- Craig McKay
- Dave McKean
- David McKee
- Shawn McManus
- Lilian Marguerite Medland
- Will G. Mein
- Farshid Mesghali
- David Messer
- Ken Messer – British watercolourist, illustrator
- Harald Metzkes
- Florence Meyerheim
- Ronald Michaud
- Yevgeniy Migunov
- H. R. Millar
- Mr Bingo
- Fanny Elizabeth de Mole – botanical illustrator
- Tim Molloy
- Chris Monroe
- Jeanne Montbaston
- Jacqui Morgan
- Julie Morstad - Canadian author and illustrator
- Barry Moser
- Colonel Moutarde
- Alfons Mucha
- Salvatore Murdocca
- Kelly Murphy

== N ==
- Namboothiri
- Gogu Neagoe
- Kadir Nelson
- Barbara Nessim
- Vicky Newman
- Victo Ngai
- Kay Nielsen
- Christoph Niemann – German illustrator, writer; frequent New Yorker magazine contributor
- Adam Niklewicz
- Ignacio Noe

== O ==
- Violet Oakley
- John O'Carroll – British archaeological illustrator
- Alan Odle
- Elena Odriozola – Spanish children's book illustrator
- Power O'Malley
- Glen Orbik
- István Orosz
- Emre Ozdemir

== P ==
- Sidney Paget
- Walter Paget
- Gaman Palem
- John Jude Palencar
- Fung Chin Pang
- William Papas
- Roberto Parada
- Eric Parker
- Peter Parnall
- Maxfield Parrish
- Dave Pascal
- Alan Stuart Paterson
- Frank R. Paul
- C. F. Payne
- Bob Peak
- Mervyn Peake
- Susan Beatrice Pearse
- Clara Elsene Peck
- Thomas Mitchell Peirce
- Bob Penuelas
- Laura Pérez Vernetti
- Domingo F. Periconi
- Rosa C. Petherick
- Keats Petree
- Valerie Petts – English watercolourist, illustrator
- Mary Petty
- S. D. Phadnis
- LeUyen Pham – Vietnamese-born American children's book illustrator
- Craig Phillips
- Françoise Pichard
- André Pijet
- Brian Pilkington
- Rose M. M. Pitman
- Hanoch Piven
- George Wolfe Plank
- Willy Pogany
- Beatrix Potter
- Richard M. Powers
- Ernest Prater
- Michael Mathias Prechtl
- Alice and Martin Provensen
- Howard Pyle

== Q ==
- Rosane Quintella

== R ==
- Arthur Rackham
- Arifur Rahman – Bangladeshi-born Norwegian cartoonist
- Alberto Rapisarda
- Chris Raschka
- Walter Ratterman
- Barb Rausch
- Leonard Raven-Hill
- Else Raydt
- Gardner Rea
- Mary A. Reardon
- Ralph Reese
- Marlene Reidel – German children's-book illustrator
- Charles M. Relyea
- Emma Rendel
- Sarah Rhodes
- Renée Rienties – Dutch illustrator of comic books
- Robert Riger
- Elizabeth Rivers
- David Roberts
- Albert Robida – French illustrator, etcher, lithographer, caricaturist, novelist
- Heath Robinson
- Christine Roche
- Norman Rockwell
- Laura Rodig
- Spain Rodriguez
- Lucinda Rogers
- Valentina Romeo
- Artie Romero
- Félicien Rops
- Don Rosa
- Rosalys – French writer and illustrator of art books, children's books and exhibitions
- Alex Ross
- Graham Roumieu
- Øystein Runde
- Willie Rushton
- Mark Ryden

== S ==
- Robert Sabuda
- Wiktor Sadowski
- Alberto Saichann
- Xavier Saint-Just
- Armando Salas
- B. B. Sams
- Dan Santat
- Hal Santiago
- Norman Saunders
- Zina Saunders
- Allen Say
- Gerald Scarfe
- Richard Scarry – American writer, illustrator; creator of Busytown, a fictional town depicted in several books by Scarry
- Charles Schneeman
- Adolf Schrödter
- Simon Schwartz
- Marilyn Scott-Waters - children’s book illustrator
- Richard A. Scott
- Steve Scott – American illustrator of comic books
- Henry Seabright
- Ronald Searle
- Wilhelmina Seegmiller
- Adrienne Segur
- Maurice Sendak
- Kate Seredy
- Ben Shahn
- Nick Sharratt
- Mark Shasha
- John Shelley
- Ernest Shepard
- Claude Allin Shepperson
- Dorothy Sherrill – American editor, illustrator, writer; specializes in children's books
- Gary Shipman
- David Shrigley
- John Sibbick
- Shel Silverstein – American writer, cartoonist, songwriter, musician
- Anne Simon – French bande dessinée (also kmown as Franco-Belgian comics) writer and illustrator
- Parismita Singh – Indian illustrator, graphic novelist, educator
- Peter Sís
- Jessie Willcox Smith
- Joseph A. Smith
- Lane Smith
- Cal Sobrepeña
- Fermín Solís
- Konstantin Somov
- Suzy Spafford
- Lancelot Speed
- Armstrong Sperry
- Art Spiegelman
- Peter Spier
- Minnie Dibdin Spooner
- Bob Staake
- Ralph Steadman
- Frederic Dorr Steele
- William Steig
- Ralph Stein
- Saul Steinberg
- Joan Steiner
- Karl Stirner – German painter, watercolorist, illustrator
- William Stobbs
- Barron Storey
- Willy Stöwer – German artist, illustrator, writer; prolific during Germany's Imperial Period
- Helen Stratton
- Drew Struzan
- Lillie Sullivan
- Arthur Suydam
- Hiromi Suzuki
- Glynis Sweeny
- Christophe Szpajdel

== T ==
- Emanuele Taglietti – Italian illustrator
- Douglas Tait
- Robert Tallon
- Shaun Tan
- Margaret Tarrant
- Robert Tavener – English book and magazine illustrator
- Gary Taxali – Canadian artist; known for his cartoon-style illustrations
- Françoise Taylor
- Prentiss Taylor
- Margaret Tempest
- Sir John Tenniel
- Henri Thiriet
- Béatrice Tillier
- Trini Tinturé
- Alton S. Tobey
- Margot Tomes
- Dolly Tree
- Stuart Tresilian
- Wallace Tripp
- Timothy Truman
- Tasha Tudor
- Michael Turner
- Dick Twinney

== U ==
- Chen Uen
- Tomi Ungerer – French artist, writer
- Clive Uptton
- Utisz

== V ==
- Boris Vallejo
- Alberto Vargas
- Gee Vaucher
- Agaate Veeber
- Max Velthuijs
- Vhrsti
- Emilio Vilà
- Erich von Götha de la Rosière

== W ==
- Charles Wadsworth
- Dugald Stewart Walker
- Ernest Wallcousins
- Charles Waterhouse
- Arthur Watts
- Betty Temple Watts
- Robert Weaver
- Emil Weiss
- Jack Welch
- Don Weller
- Paul Wenzel
- Michael Whelan
- Jon Whitcomb
- Garth Williams
- Robert Williams
- Charles Banks Wilson
- George Wilson
- Larry Winborg
- Eric Winter
- David Wisniewski
- Jonathan Wolstenholme
- Ashley Wood
- Jefferson Wood
- Leslie Wood
- Hildegard Woodward
- Shannon Wright
- Frank Wu
- N. C. Wyeth

== Y ==
- Takashi Yanase – Japanese children's book writer and illustrator
- Marianne Young (1811–1897) – English travel writer, illustrator
- Yu Rong – Chinese illustrator

== Z ==
- Margot Zemach
- Laura Zuccheri
- Lisbeth Zwerger

== See also ==
- List of caricaturists
- List of cartoonists
- List of graphic designers
- List of science fiction visual artists
