= Deeble =

Deeble is a surname. Notable people with the surname include:

- Elizabeth Deeble (1899–1972), American journalist
- Helen Deeble, British businesswoman
- Jason Deeble (born 1979), American author and illustrator
- Jon Deeble (born 1962), Australian baseball coach
- Olivia Deeble (born 2002), Australian actress
- Robert Deeble (born 1966), American singer-songwriter
