= Thiriet =

Thiriet (French pronunciation: [tiʁjɛ]) is a French surname. Notable people with the surname include:

- Henri Thiriet (1873–1946), French artist
- Maurice Thiriet (1906–1972), French composer
- Pierre Thiriet (born 1989), French racing driver
