= Relyea =

Relyea is a surname. Notable people with the surname include:

- Charles M. Relyea (1863–1932), American illustrator
- John Relyea (born 1972), Canadian bass-baritone opera singer
- Mark Relyea, American sound editor
- Robert Relyea (1930–2013), American film producer and executive
