= Burzi =

Burzi is a surname. Notable people with the surname include:

- Attila Burzi (born 1975), Hungarian footballer
- Dick Burzi (c. 1900), Argentine automotive designer
- Sergio Burzi (1901–1954), Italian painter and illustrator
