= Walter Ratterman =

American artist (1887–1944)

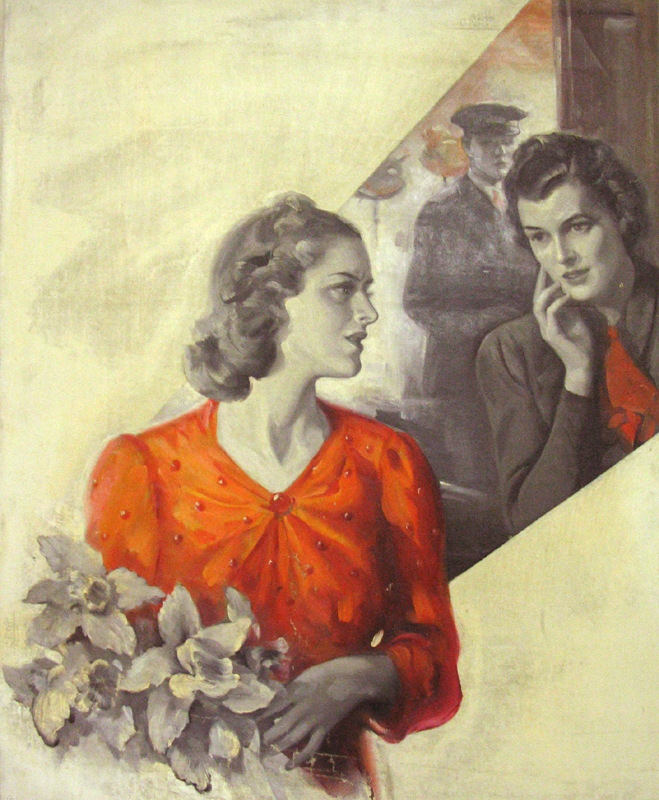
Walter Ratterman, Oil on Canvas, Two women and messenger

Walter G. Ratterman (1887–1944), or W. G. Ratterman, was a twentieth-century American genre painter and illustrator. In the 1920s, he had lived and painted in New York, where the majority of his artworks and illustrations were published. He subsequently moved and lived in Woodstock, New York from the 1930s. Ratterman's artwork was published in various American books and periodicals between the 1910s to the 1940s. He was a member of the Artists Guild of the Authors' League of America.

== Artwork ==
The paintings by Ratterman were primarily genre works, in that they portrayed ordinary people engaged in common activities and depicted aspects of everyday life during the early part of the twentieth century.

A great number of his paintings were painted "en grisaille" because they were used for reproduction as illustrations in books and periodicals prior to the introduction of four-color printing.

In addition to books, the Saturday Evening Post, Good Housekeeping, and Everybody's Magazine periodicals regularly featured his genre paintings.

His fellow artistic contemporaries included James Montgomery Flagg and Howard Chandler Christy.

== See also ==
- Genre works
- Illustration
- List of illustrators
- James Montgomery Flagg
- Howard Chandler Christy
- Norman Rockwell
- Everett Raymond Kinstler
- Saturday Evening Post
- Good Housekeeping
