= Playhour =

British children's magazine

Publication information
- Publisher: Amalgamated Press; Fleetway Publications; IPC Magazines
- Schedule: Weekly
- Format: Ongoing series
- Genre: Humor/comedy
- Publication date: 16 October 1954 – 15 August 1987
- No. of issues: c. 1700
- Main character(s): Prince, the Wonder Dog of the Golden West; Sonny and Sally of Happy Valley

Creative team
- Artist(s): Sep E. Scott, Peter Woolcock, Hugh McNeill, Nadir Quinto, Ron Embleton, Basil Reynolds, H. M. Talintyre, Ron Nielsen, Walter Bell, Fred Robinson, Fred Holmes, Philip Mendoza, Fred White, Harry Pettit, Harold McReady, Douglas Turnbull, Eric Stephens, Tom Kerr, Geoff Squire, Bert Felstead, Gordon Hutchings, Tony Hutchings, Roger Hutchings, Barbara C. Freeman, Rene Cloke, Henry Seabright, Virginio Livraghi, Ferguson Dewar, Leslie Branton and Arthur Baker, Jesus Blasco

Playhour was a British children's comics magazine published by Amalgamated Press/Fleetway/IPC between 16 October 1954 and 15 August 1987, a run of approximately 1,700 weekly issues. Playhour contained a mixture of original tales for young children and adaptations of well-known fairy tales (drawn by Nadir Quinto, Ron Embleton, Jesus Blasco and others).

== Publication history ==
Originally published under the title Playhour Pictures, it was intended as a companion to Jack and Jill, initially aimed at a slightly older audience. The lead strip in its early days was Prince, the Wonder Dog of the Golden West, drawn by Sep E. Scott.

With issue #32 (21 May 1955), the title of the publication was shortened to Playhour and it lowered its target age-group, introducing comic strips based on A. A. Milne's Winnie-the-Pooh and Kenneth Grahame's The Wind in the Willows, both drawn by Peter Woolcock.

1956 saw the arrival of Sonny and Sally of Happy Valley, two children (and their pet lamb) who were to be associated with the title until its demise in 1987. The stories of Sonny and Sally (drawn by Hugh McNeill) were initially related in rhyming couplets, as were a number of other early stories, although by the end of the 1970s the stories were written in normal prose form. (Others were told in captions below the illustration, or text comics, as Playhour avoided the use of word balloons.) Sonny and Sally "wrote" the weekly editorial letter and children writing to the publisher's editorial address (Cosy Corner, The Fleetway House, Farringdon Street, London E.C.4) would receive replies "signed" by Sonny and Sally.

=== Mergers ===
It was standard practice in the twentieth-century British comics industry to merge a magazine into another one when it declined in sales. Typically, three stories or strips from the cancelled magazine would continue for a while in the surviving magazine, and both titles would appear on the cover (one in a smaller font than the other) until the title of the cancelled magazine was eventually dropped. Playhour exemplified this practice, with nine other publications merging into it over the course of its existence:

- 15 March 1957 — merged with Chicks' Own (1920 series)
- 31 January 1959 — merged with Tiny Tots (1927 series)
- 11 April 1964 — merged with Harold Hare (1959 series)
- 2 March 1968 — merged with TV Toyland (1966 series)
- 1 February 1969 — merged with Robin (1953 series)
- 22 September 1973 — merged with Hey Diddle Diddle and Bobo Bunny (1972 series)
- 17 May 1975 — merged with Bonnie (1974 series)
- 13 March 1982 — merged with Fun To Do (1978 series)
- 6 August 1983 — merged with Chips Comic (1983 series)

== Series published in Playhour ==
- Billy Brock's Schooldays
- Bunny Cuddles
- Jolly Days with Dicky and Dolly
- The Dolly Girls
- Leo the Friendly Lion
- Little Red Squirrel
- The Magic Roundabout, based on the TV series
- The Merry Tales of Mimi and Marmy
- Mr Men, based on the children's book series on Roger Hargreaves
- Norman Gnome
- Num Num and His Funny Family
- Pinky and Perky, based on the TV series
- Prince, the Wonder Dog of the Golden West
- Sonny and Sally of Happy Valley
- Sooty, based on the TV series
- Tiger Tim and the Bruin Boys
- Tommy Trouble
- The Travels of Gulliver Guinea-Pig
- Wink and Blink, the Playful Puppies
- The Wonderful Tales of Willow Wood

== Sources ==
- Playhour Pictures at the Grand Comics Database
- Playhour at the Grand Comics Database
