= Zina Saunders =

American artist and illustrator

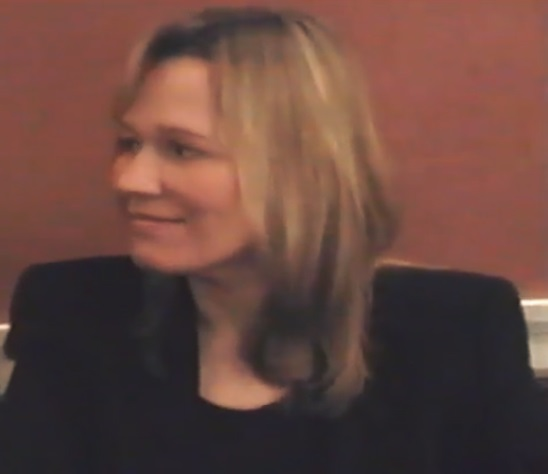
Zina Saunders in 2009

Zina Saunders (born August 30, 1953) is a Manhattan-based artist, writer, animator and educator. Her book Overlooked New York, a collection of interviews, profiles and portraits, was published in 2009.

== Life and work ==
A native New Yorker, Zina Saunders is the daughter of illustrator Norman Saunders. She attended High School of Music and Art and Cooper Union (dropping out a short way into the course) but also learned much about painting and commercial art from her father. She has illustrated for a variety of publishers (Simon & Schuster, Random House, Scholastic Books, Oxford University Press), while contributing to magazines, including The Wall Street Journal, The New York Times Sunday Book Review, Time Out New York and Outré.

Her book Overlooked New York (2009) is a collection of interviews, profiles and portraits of diverse New York subcultures and hobbyists. Subjects include amateur astronomers, bike messengers, carnival costume designers, cricket players, keepers of rooftop pigeon coops, kite flyers, scuba divers, street performers, subway musicians and urban gardeners. The project began in the fall of 2004 with her observation of colorful, decorative bicycles.

In 2010, for Mother Jones, she began creating regular weekly animations (which feature Saunders doing the voices of all the characters).

In November 2009, Overlooked New York was published as a book, collecting more than 60 of the profiles and portraits.

== Awards ==
Saunders' updated design of the Pink Panther character for United Artists brought her an award from Print and her Native Americans trading card set of 106 illustrations was chosen Most Creative Trading Card Set by the trade magazine Non-Sport Update. She has contributed to numerous trading card sets, including Wacky Packages, Magic: The Gathering and Goosebumps.

Excerpts from "Art Talks," her series of portraits and interviews with illustrators and art directors, are featured in Illo magazine. Portraits from that series are in American Illustration 26 Annual and American Illustration 27 Annual. Five of her portraits were selected for the Communication Arts Illustration Annual 2008. Four pages in Graphic: Inside the Sketchbooks of the World's Great Graphic Designers by Steven Heller and Lita Talarico (Monacelli Press, 2010) demonstrate how her sketches evolve into digital paintings.

Saunders has taught illustration at the University of the Arts in Philadelphia.

== See also ==
List of illustrators
