= Elisabeth Haussard =

French scientific illustrator

Élisabeth Haussard
- Born: 1700; Paris, France
- Died: 1804 (aged 103–104)
- Occupations: Scientific illustrator and engraver
- Father: Jean-Baptiste Haussard

Élisabeth Haussard (1700 in Paris – 1804) was a French scientific illustrator and engraver.

== Biography ==
Élisabeth Haussard was the youngest daughter born into the family of engraver Jean-Baptiste Haussard. Along with her older sister Catherine Haussard, she took part in illustrating scientific and technical works, specialising in engraving legends and labels for geographical maps.

Her signature took the form: « E^{th} Haussard », « El^{th} Haussard », « Elis haussard », « E. Haußard », etc.

== Selected works ==
Élisabeth Haussard partly illustrated the following works :

- Henri Louis Duhamel du Monceau (1761). "L'Art de la Draperie". Description des Arts et Métiers. Paris: Chez Saillant & Nyon. p. 150. with fifteen illustrated pages, two by Élisabeth Haussard.
- Henri Louis Duhamel du Monceau (1767). "L'Art du Serrurier". Description des Arts et Métiers. Paris: Chez Saillant & Nyon. p. 302. with 42 illustrated pages, including five by Élisabeth Haussard.
- Abbé Nollet (1765). "L'Art de faire les Chapeaux". Description des Arts et Métiers. Paris: Chez Saillant & Nyon. p. 94. with six illustrated pages, including one by Élisabeth Haussard.
- André-Jacob Roubo (1769–1775). "L'Art du Menuisier". Description des Arts et Métiers. Paris: Chez Saillant & Nyon. p. 1312. with 382 illustrated pages, including numbers 19 and 20 by Élisabeth Haussard.
- Jean-Jacques Perret (1761). "L'Art du Coutelier". Description des Arts et Métiers. Paris: Chez Saillant & Nyon. p. 239. with 72 illustrated pages, including 7 by Élisabeth Haussard.

== Selected gallery ==
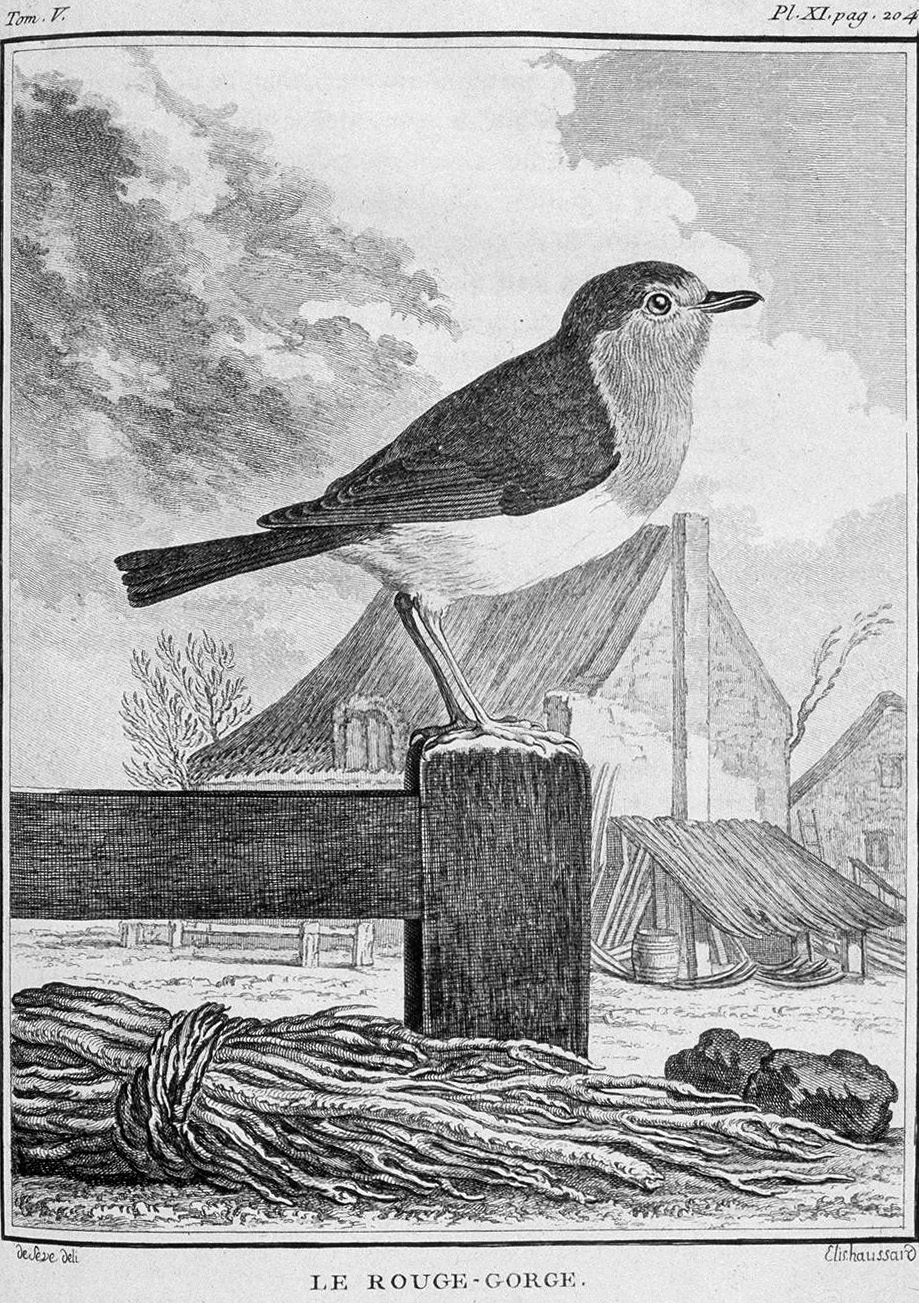
Rouge-gorge

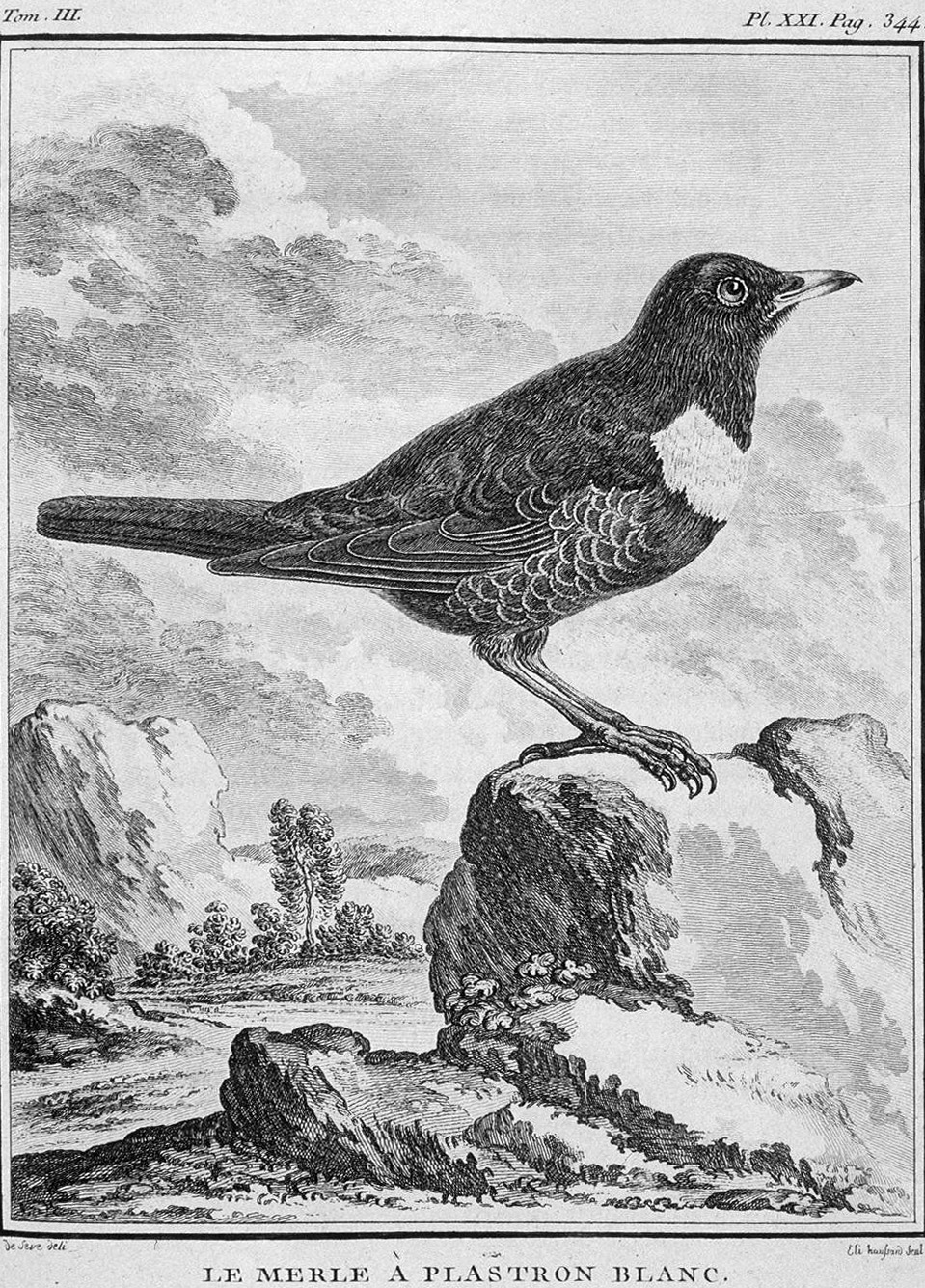
Merle à plastron blanc

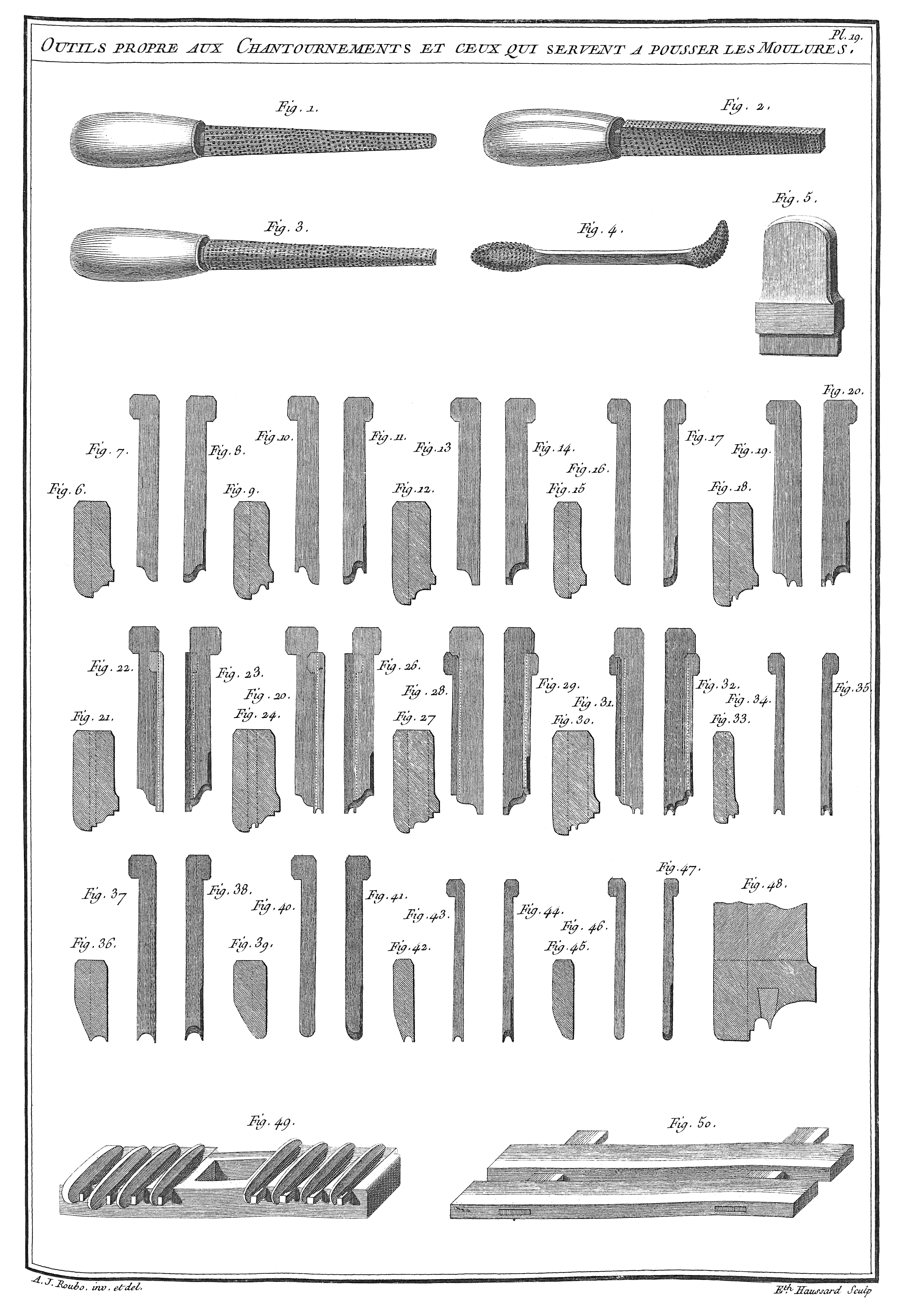
L'Art du Menuisier - A.-J. Roubo, Planche 19

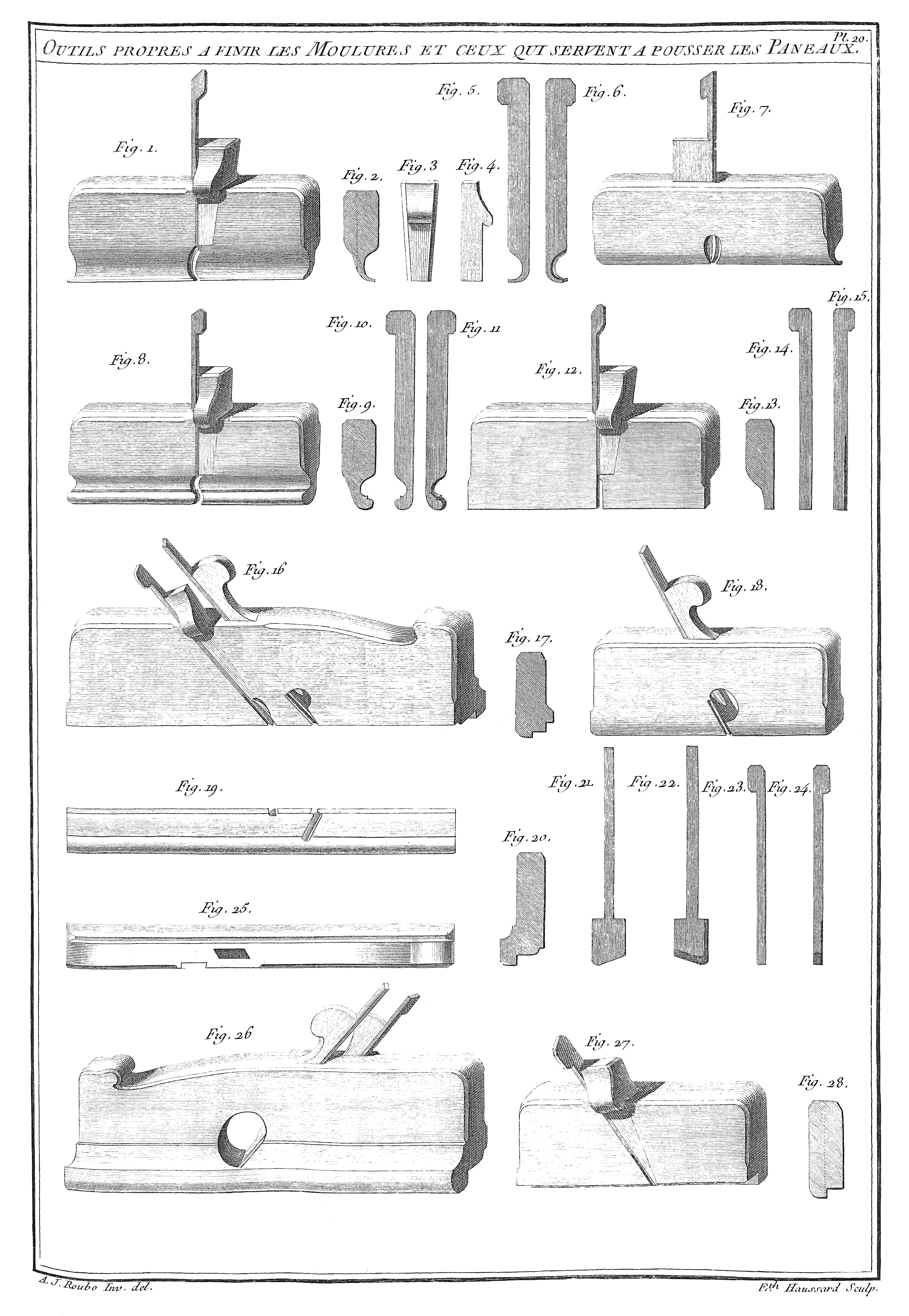
L'Art du Menuisier - A.-J. Roubo, Planche 20
