= Elizabeth Deeble =

American journalist

Elizabeth Deeble (1899–1972) was an American journalist who lived in Spain during the Spanish Civil War. She worked in Barcelona and signed her articles "E.O. Deeble" to avoid rejection from editors due to her being a woman. Her friends thus began calling her "Deeble".

In one paragraph, she described the refugees of Valencia in 1936, when the war had just started:

Unhappy people whose poor homes no longer exist and who still carry their worldly goods upon their backs, are still pouring into Valencia at all hours. Were it not for the extraordinary efficiency with which they are fed, clothed, comforted and shipped out again to nearby towns and villages, they would indeed be a heavy problem, for this city of 400,000 inhabitants has received during the last month almost a million outsiders of one sort or another.

She was a friend of Kitty Bowler, a volunteer from the World Committee Against War and Fascism. She also maintained a correspondence with Josephine Cobb.

Apart from her work as a war correspondent, Deeble worked as head of the English-speaking section of the Catalan Propaganda Commissariat that was formed in 1937; in this role one British resident of Barcelona described Deeble as "'a glorious snob' without any interest in politics". Deeble lived fifteen years in Barcelona and was also described as a "superb guide".
