= Rosane Quintella =

Brazilian botanical artist (1959–2020)

- Born: February 25, 1959 (age 67); São Paulo, Brazil
- Died: September 11, 2020 (aged 61)
- Occupation: Botanical artist
- Known for: Botanical illustrations

Rosane Quintella (25 February 1959 – 11 September 2020) was a Brazilian botanical artist and teacher.

== Life and work ==
Quintella was born 25 February 1959 in Sao Paulo, Brazil.

She studied at the School of Music and Fine Arts of Paraná at the Curitiba campus of the University of the State of Paraná in Brazil, graduating in the plastic arts in 1982. Later, in 1992, she took a bachelor's degree in biology from the Pontifical Catholic University of Paraná and then a specialist course in illustration in 2002. In 2005 she was the 17th Margaret Mee Fellow in Botanical Illustration at Kew Gardens. She then became a director of the Paraná Botanical Illustration Center (Centro de Ilustração Botânica do Paraná) in Curitiba and taught botanical illustration until 2019.

She worked in watercolours as well as pen and ink for technical illustrations. Her work is within the collections of the Royal Botanic Gardens, Kew including the Shirley Sherwood Gallery.

== Death ==
She died 11 September 2020.
