= Mitch Butler =

American television personality

Mitch Butler, the "Investigative Cartoonist," is a television personality and illustrator who specializes in visual explanation. He has explained current events on The CBS Evening News with Katie Couric, CBS News Sunday Morning, The CBS Early Show with Harry Smith, and the Science Channel's Brink. In addition to his on-camera work, he also produces non-fiction animation for television programs like Nova. Mitch Butler collaborates with newsman Josh Landis at CBS to create The Fast Draw, an ongoing cartoon explanation series.

== Career ==
Mitch Butler has taught animated storytelling and visual explanation at New York University, and The School of Visual Arts and Parsons School of Design.

== Personal information ==
Mitch Butler was born and raised in Alaska, and now lives in New York City with wife Denise Spellman Butler.
