= Roman Genn =

American cartoonist

Roman Genn (born May 17, 1972) is an American artist. He is most well known for his illustrations for the conservative magazine National Review, of which he is a contributing editor.[1] Genn was born and grew up in Moscow and moved to the United States in 1991. While living in the USSR's he was repeatedly arrested for publicly exhibiting anti-government caricatures.

Besides National Review, Genn's work has appeared in other publications, including the Los Angeles Times, New York Times, Wall Street Journal, Washington Post, Chicago Tribune, Baltimore Sun, New York Daily News, International Herald Tribune, Newsday, Newsweek, Saatchi & Saatchi, TV Guide, Barron's, The American Lawyer, and the works of HarperCollins and Penguin Group.[4]

There was an uproar during the Clinton years when Genn depicted Bill Clinton, Hillary Clinton and Al Gore on a National Review cover titled "The Manchurian Candidates." Genn's covers depicting Sonia Sotomayor as a Buddha and President Barack Obama as a proctologist produced similar responses.

In 2009, Genn embedded himself with the 3rd Battalion 8th Marines at Forward Operating Base Gulistan in Farah Province, central Afghanistan, where he drew sketches of that unit's actions in the global war on terror.
