= Thomas Mitchell Peirce =

Thomas Mitchell Peirce (born April 5, 1864) was an American artist and illustrator in the illustrated trade-fiction marketplace of the early 20th century.

The son of Peter Randolph Livingston Peirce and Cordella Mitchell, he was born in Grand Rapids, Michigan and educated at Bates Preparatory School, San Francisco before studying art in New York City and Paris. In 1897 he married Harriet May Neal. Neal was niece of L. Frank Baum.

Peirce was associated with the turn-of-the-century image of the "American girl." In a 1903 Ladies’ Home Journal piece, “How I Draw the American Girl,” he presented drawing less as a fixed formula than as a matter of feeling and temperament.

Peirce died in 1929 in Syracuse, New York.

== Books illustrated ==
- Richard Harding Davis, In the Fog, 1901
- Harold MacGrath, The Grey Cloak, 1903
- Theodora Agnes Peck, Hester of the Grants: A Romance of Old Bennington, 1905
- L. Frank Baum, Daughters of Destiny, 1906
- Sir Walter Scott, Ivanhoe, 1903
