= Magdalena Rosina Funck =

German botanical artist (1672–1695)

- Born: Magdalena Rosina Heuchelin; 1672; Nuremberg, Germany
- Died: 1695 (aged 22–23)

Magdalena Rosina Funck (1672–1695) was a German botanical illustrator best known for creating a 1692 collection of watercolor illustrations titled Blumenbuch or Book of Flowers. She died after 4 December 1695.

== Biography ==
Magdalena Rosina Heuchelin was from a prominent Nuremberg family and baptized there 15 March 1672. Her father, Christian Heuchelin, had moved to the area in 1667 to begin work in politics. Very little is known about Magdalena Funck's personal life or education. She was likely influenced by prominent scientific illustrator Maria Sibylla Merian, who lived nearby in Nuremberg until the mid-1680s. Though Funck's attendance specifically cannot be confirmed, Merian regularly offered drawing lessons to the unmarried daughters of local wealthy elites.

=== Blumenbuch ===
Magdalena Funck was a mere 20 years old when she completed an extensive botanical compendium featuring 297 watercolor illustrations of flower specimens accompanied by their names written in German in 1692. She titled the collection Blumenbuch and donated the original manuscript to her father's alma mater, the University of Altdorf, as the school was renowned for its botanical gardens. The original Blumenbuch now resides in the United States at Dumbarton Oaks, a research facility in Washington, D.C. An 18th-century artist's copy of the book is housed at the Hunt Institute for Botanical Documentation at Carnegie Mellon University in Pittsburgh, Pennsylvania.

Funck's botanical illustrations were reproduced on Meissen porcelain in 1742.

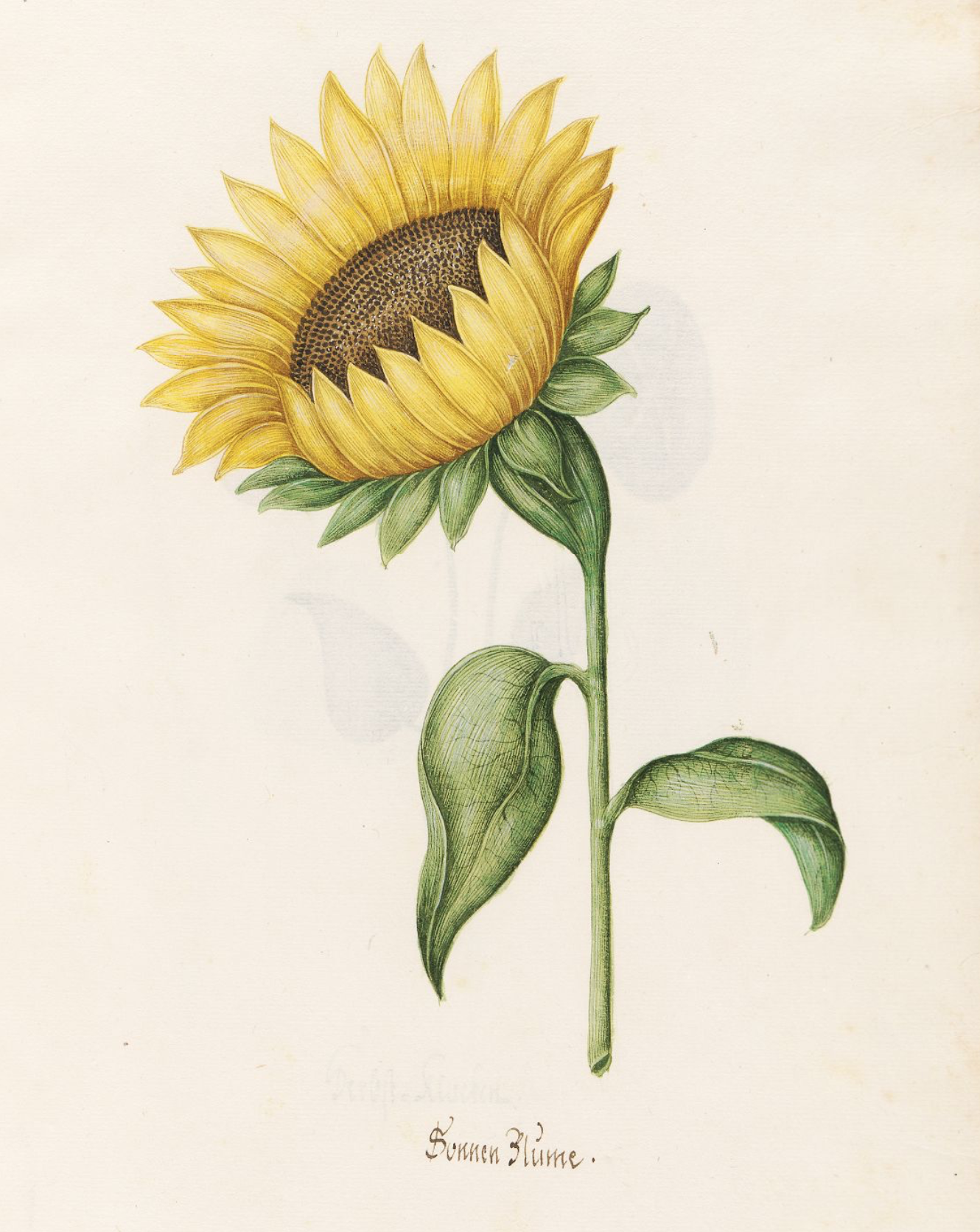
Sonnen Blüme (Sunflower), p. 478

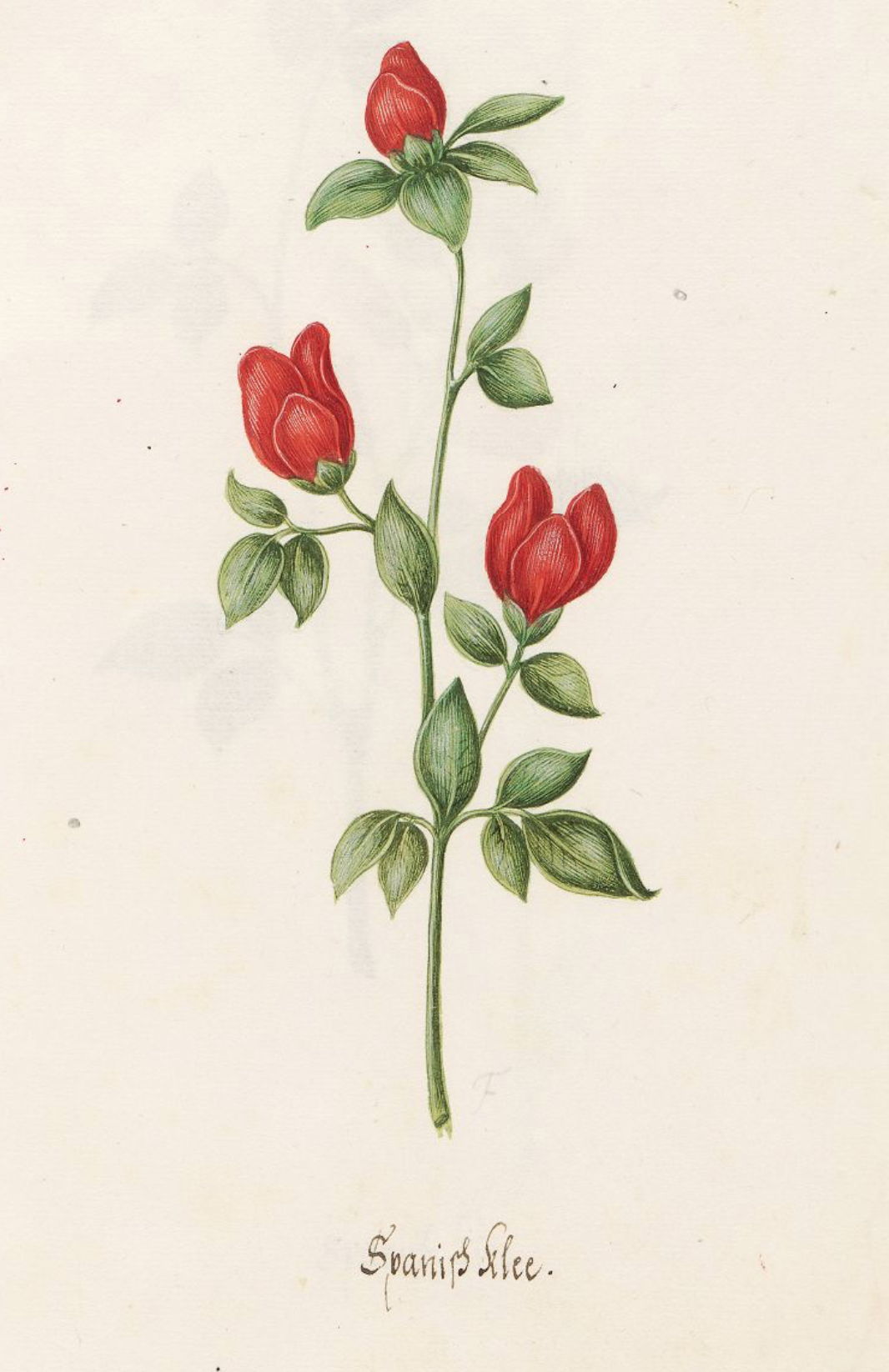
Spanish Klee (Spanish Clover), p. 530

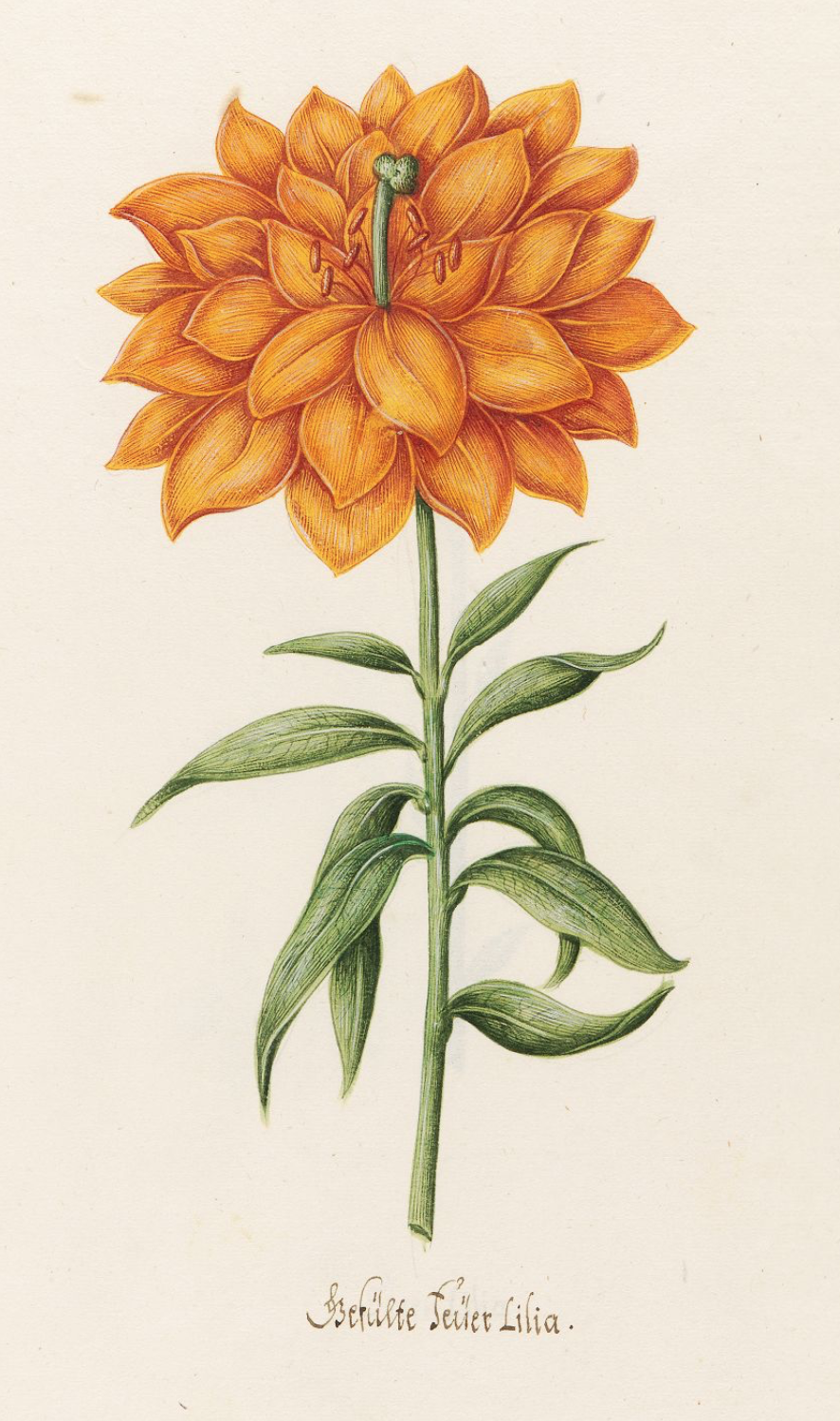
Gefülte Feüer Lilia (Fire Lily), p. 198

== Literature ==
- Heitren Ludwig: Nuremberg natural history painters and engravers of the 17th and 18th centuries. Marburg an der Lahn 1998, pp. 201, 330.
- Manfred H. Griebe: Nuremberg Artists Lexicon: Visual artists, craftsmen, scholars, collectors, cultural workers and patrons from the 12th to the middle of the 20th century. Berlin 2007.
