= Adrienne Segur =

French children's book illustrator

- Born: 23 November 1901; Athens, Greece
- Died: 11 August 1981 (aged 79); Paris, France
- Known for: Illustration
- Spouse: Mounir Hafez

Adrienne Segur (23 November 1901 – 11 August 1981) was a French children's book illustrator. Segur's illustrations were made known by the publishing house Flammarion in the 1950s and 1960s and appeared particularly in The Fairy Tale Book, the English translation of Il Etait Une Fois published in 1958 by Golden Books, Simon and Schuster.

Segur was born in Athens, Greece, in the family of French writer Nicolas Segur. Around 1932 she married the Egyptian poet and thinker fr:Mounir Hafez. In 1934, The Fairy Tales of Perrault by Adrienne Segur was published. In 1936–1939, Segur was the director of the children's column in Le Figaro where she made all the illustrations.

Segur died in Paris, France.
