= Barbara C. Freeman =

English writer and illustrator

Barbara Constance Freeman
- Born: 29 November 1906; Ealing, United Kingdom
- Died: 1999; Surbiton, United Kingdom
- Known for: Illustration

Fairy tale illustration by Barbara C. Freeman

Barbara Constance Freeman (29 November 1906 – 1999) was an English writer and illustrator of books for children and young adults.

== Biography ==
Barbara Constance Freeman was born on 29 November 1906 in Ealing, near London. She attended the Tiffin Girls' School in Kingston upon Thames in Surrey and later studied at the Kingston School of Art.

She illustrated many books by other writers, including The Treasure Hunters by Enid Blyton, and many collections of fairy tales, both traditional tales by the Brothers Grimm and Hans Christian Andersen and modern stories. Some of her earliest illustrations are found in The Cuckoo Book (1942), a book of fairy tales by Edith Mary Bell. She also contributed to comics, including Playhour, and to annuals, such as Blackie's Children's Annual 1934.

By the 1960s she had begun writing and illustrating her own books for children and young adults. Some have a touch of fantasy: in Two-Thumb Thomas the eponymous hero is raised by school cats; in Broom-Adelaide, a fox rides a flying broomstick. Some, including Lucinda and The Name on the Glass, are set in the past, while in others, such as A Book by Georgina and The Other Face, the lives of the main characters are interwoven with history.

Her books have not remained in print, but some of her illustrations are still available as posters and art prints.

== Bibliography ==
- Two-Thumb Thomas (1961)
- A Book by Georgina (1962)
- Broom-Adelaide (1963)
- The Name on the Glass (1964)
- Lucinda (1965)
- The Forgotten Theatre (1967)
- Tobias (1967)
- Timi, the Tale of a Griffin (1970)
- The Other Face (1975)
- A Haunting Air (1977)
- A Pocket of Silence (1977)
- The Summer Travellers (1978)
- Snow in the Maze (1979)
- Clemency in the Moonlight (1981)
