= Marianne Young =

English travel writer and illustrator

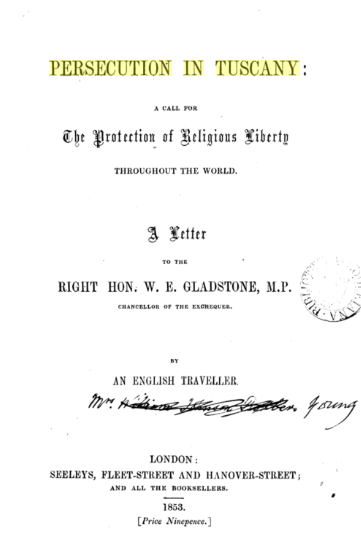
- Born: 4 January 1811; Pimlico, London, England
- Died: 6 October 1897 (aged 86); Wrington, England
- Writing career
- Genre: travel
- Subject: British India

Marianne Ridgway became Mrs. Thomas Postans and Marianne Young (4 January 1811 – 6 October 1897) was an English travel writer and illustrator.

== Life ==
She was born in 1811 in Pimlico as Marianne Ridgway, her parents being Elizabeth Wells née Fortescue and Richard Bowling Hunter Ridgway. Her father dealt in wine and was held in the Fleet Prison for debt in 1822.

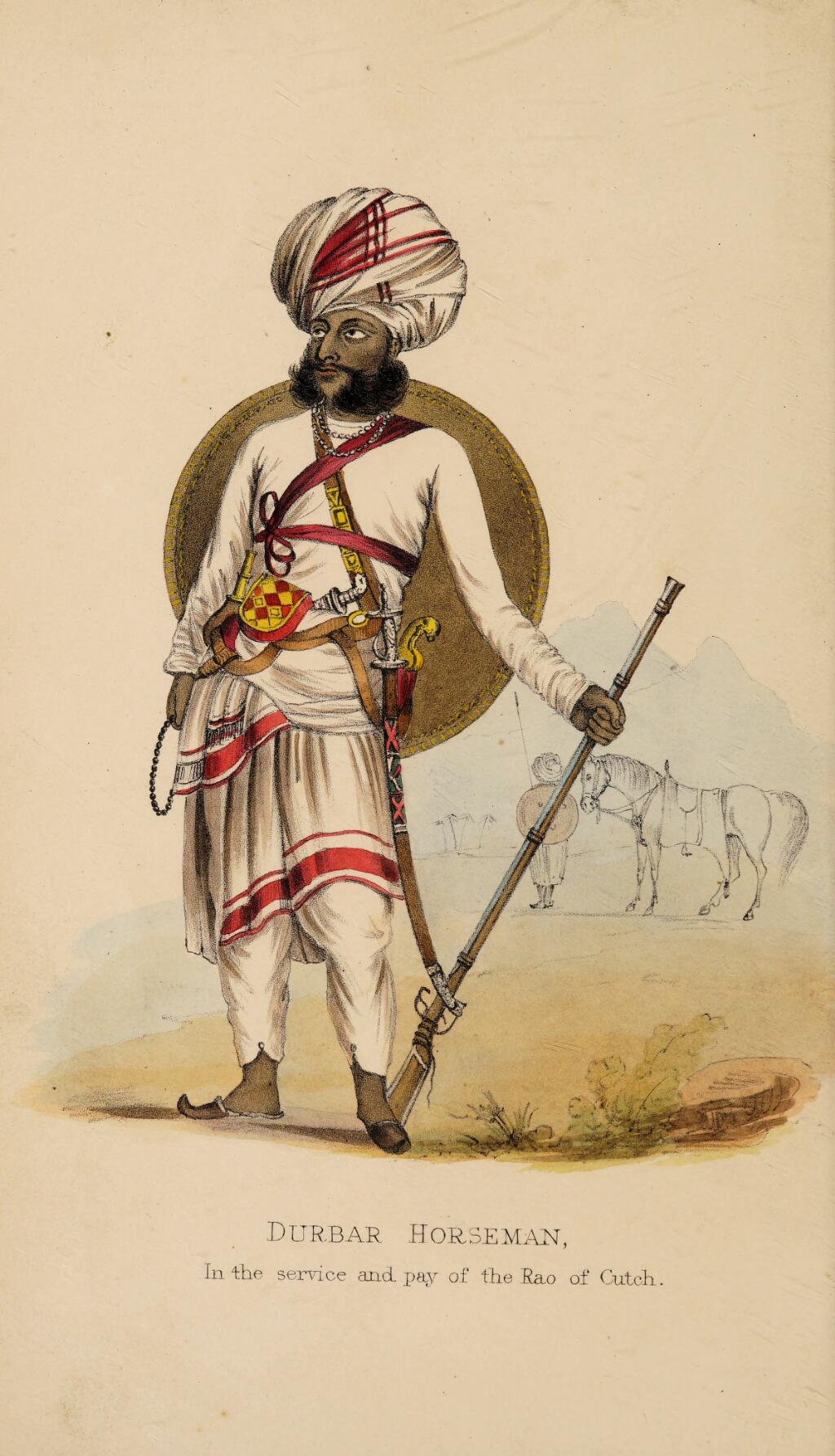
"Durbar Horseman" employed by the Rao of Cutch - from her 1839 book

In 1839 she published her first book, ""Cutch; or, random sketches" which she created while living in that area of western India with her husband, Thomas Postans. She wrote in a light style but her research was intense. She became fluent in Hindustani and she would support her text with her own illustrations. She had been living in the area for five years and her illustrated book included stories of the area's legends and its traditions. In the same year she published a two volume work, Western India in 1838, which expanded in the work on Cutch to include a wider area including the city of Mumbai which was then known as Bombay. These books were published in the year that her husband, now a Lieutenant, was posted to Sind in what is now Pakistan.

Her work mirrored that of her husband as he has creating reports for the British government and she was reporting similar subjects for a popular audience. at Varna After five years in Sindh she published Facts and Fictions which went to three volumes. In the same year her husband died and she returned to Britain where she married again in 1848 to William Henry Young, a widower.

In 1853 she published Persecution in Tuscany: a call for the protection of religious liberty throughout the world ... which was addressed to William Gladstone. In 1854 she published Our Camp in Turkey and the Way to it describing travels including a visit to the English camp at Varna during the Crimean conflict. . Her final book, Aldershot, And All About It - With Gossip, Literary, Military, and Pictorial was published in 1857.

Young died in 1897 in Wrington.
