= Vicky Newman =

British illustrator (born 1982)

Vicky Newman (born 29 October 1982) is a British illustrator.

Born in Pembury, Kent, Newman graduated with honours from Falmouth College of Arts in 2005 with a BA in Communication Design | Illustration She is an advertising and publishing illustrator, best known for advertisements and poster design. Her style is an eclectic mix of hand rendered line and digital colour and has similarities to the Art Nouveau artists such as Aubrey Beardsley and Alfons Mucha as well as modern movements in contemporary illustration design.

Newman has worked on campaigns for Camel Cigarettes, Dolce & Gabbana, and The Independent. She has also worked for advertising companies such as Gyro Worldwide in Philadelphia and Brand New World in New York City and for charities including American breast cancer charity Keep A Breast and British environmental and health charity Surfers Against Sewage. She a member of the illustration collective House of Aces.

== Press coverage ==
Newman has been profiled on Charles Saatchi's Student artist's website. She has been interviewed by The Independent in the UK, , The Financial Times in the UK, Folha de S.Paulo in Brazil and ABC News in America

== Exhibitions ==
Autumn 2009, Inkygoodness 3 'Wonderland' a showcase of 30 international illustrators, artists and image-makers, Vaad Gallery, The Custard Factory, Birmingham
Summer 2009, Decked, an exhibition of hand painted/crafter skate decks, Stolenspace Gallery, Shoreditch, London
Winter 2008, Inkygoodness 2 'Hopes & Fears' group show of 16 illustrators based in the U.K, Centrespace Gallery, Bristol, U.K
Spring 2008, Unexpected Illustration! a showcase of work produced by illustration collective House of Aces at the George House Gallery, Folkestone
Summer 2007, Solo exhibition of current work in TBWA at their central London headquarters,
Included as part of Noise Festival 2006-2007 held throughout the UK, aiming to exhibit the best new talent in design, fashion, film, music, architecture and written word.
Summer 2006 'First Class Post' Newman's work was included in an exhibition of artists living and working in Kent. Exhibited in four galleries across South East England.
Summer 2005, New Designers, Islington exhibited as part of a showcase of emerging British design students.
Spring 2005, 'A Guide to Doodling' Falmouth an exhibition of seven contemporary British illustrators.
