= Boey =

Malaysian artist

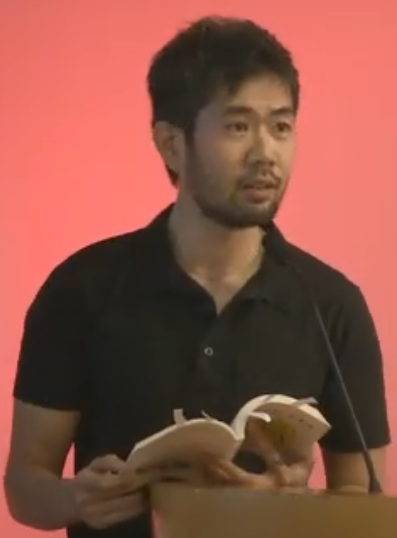
- Speaking at the San Francisco Public Library in 2014
- Born: Cheeming Boey; 12 April 1978 (age 48) Singapore
- Areas: Writer, Artist
- Pseudonym: Boey

Cheeming Boey (born 12 April 1978) is a Malaysian artist. Primarily known only by his last name Boey, he is best recognised by his illustrations on foam coffee cups, his daily webcomic I Am Boey, and his autobiographical graphic novel When I Was A Kid.

== Early life and career ==
Boey was born in Singapore and grew up on a song bird farm in Malaysia. He initially went to the United States to study advertising at the Academy of Art University (AAU) in San Francisco, but later switched to Computer Animation. After graduation, Boey returned to AAU to teach in the Computer Animation department. In 1999 he began working for game developer Blizzard Entertainment as a lead animator on Diablo II and Diablo III. During that time, Boey briefly left Blizzard to work at Factor 5 on Lair. Today Boey writes full-time and does freelance design work. His clients include; Mattel, Disney, 7-Eleven, Esquire, Vittoria Coffee, and draftfcb. He is also a travelling lecturer and has spoken at Ted X Weldquay. Boey currently has a weekly comic published in The Edge.

== Projects ==
=== Graphic novel and webcomic ===
In 2007, Boey began a daily webcomic about the experiences of his day. He currently posts six days a week. Boey's book, When I Was A Kid, is meant to be a prequel to the blog of his adult life. In May 2012, When I Was A Kid became a local non-fiction best-seller in Malaysia. He is currently focusing on distribution in Asia, but his book is available internationally through the Blurb website. Boey published his second book, When I Was A Kid 2, in July 2013, and it was a success.

=== Coffee cup art ===
Boey began illustrating on polystyrene foam cups in Southern California; first because he had no paper, and then out of appreciation for the results. Artist A Day selected Boey for Best Illustrator in 2011. He has said he is inspired by artists such as Hokusai, Kieth Haring, Moebius, Lat, and Doraemon. Many of his pieces are also inspired by his travels and personal experiences. Today, his works are featured in galleries in the US and Asia.

=== Start with Sharpie Campaign ===
In 2011, Sharpie took notice of Boey's cup art and featured him in their Start With Sharpie advertising campaign. Director Shal Ngo's Sharpie commercial, Sharpie: Coffee Cups to Canvas, featuring Boey and his cup art, was a recipient of the 2012 TED Ads Worth Spreading award.

== Listing of selected work ==
Publications

- I Am Boey (webcomic blog, weekly comic through The Edge (Malaysia))
- When I Was A Kid (webcomic, book series)
- How Was Your Day

Gallery Presence

- Coffee Cup Art

Video games

- World of Warcraft
- Lair
- Diablo II
- Diablo III

== Awards ==
- 1999 — Indies Film Award, Best Animated Short for "Olive"
- 2001 — Academy of Interactive Arts & Sciences, Interactive Achievement Award, Game of the Year for Diablo II
- 2012 — TED Ads Worth Spreading Award, Start With Sharpie
- 2013 — Popular Books Malaysia, Readers' Choice Award
- 2013 — New Man Magazine, Young Entrepreneurs nominee
- 2013 — BMW and Men's Uno Malaysia, Men of Substance Award: Most Influential Artist of 2013
- 2015 — Popular Books Malaysia, Readers' Choice
