= Virginio Livraghi =

Italian cartoonist

Virginio Livraghi is an Italian comic strip artist and illustrator who worked for the British nursery comics Playhour and Once Upon a Time.

== Books Illustrated by Virginio Livraghi in English ==
- Alice in Wonderland, retold by Jane Carruth (London, Odhams, 1963)
- Curly the Pig, by Maria Pia Pezzi (New York, Golden Press, 1967)
- Brer Rabbit, by Barbara Hayes (Vero Beach, Fla., Rourke Enterprises, 1984; ISBN 0-86592-228-4)
