= Félix Lorioux =

French illustrator

Félix Lorioux (1872–1964) was a French illustrator.

Born in Angers, he began to study art as an apprentice (with painters on glass), then in Angers and Paris Ecole des Beaux Arts. He was employed by Citroën (French car manufacturer) as a drafter for a few years, then as an illustrator for Hachette (Fables de La Fontaine, Contes de Perrault). A friend of Walt Disney, who admired his work, he was then hired to illustrate Mickey stories for the French market, as well as The Silly Symphony. But Lorioux' style, full of humour and fancy, widely inspired by Art Nouveau and Japanese painting, was too far from Disney world, and the contract was broken in 1934.

A quiet man, with no interest in self-promotion, Lorioux took on a career as a book illustrator, and became one of French best loved artist. Among his main achievements, illustrations for Le Buffon des enfants, a best-seller book of natural history for children.
