= Walter Haskell Hinton =

American artist

Walter Haskell Hinton was a painter and illustrator. He attended the Art Institute of Chicago 1901-1904, and he lived most of his life in the Chicago area, but spent some time in New York City, and Philadelphia.

== Early life ==
Walter Haskell Hinton was born August 24, 1886 in San Francisco.(1886–1980) His father Walter Otho Hinton was a well-traveled man, a linguist with a strong memory who worked for the San Francisco Chronicle, possibly as a compositor. His mother, Mary Washburn Haskell Hinton, had artistic abilities. Hinton credited his own visual memory to a combination of his parents’ talents. The family moved to Denver and then to Chicago at the time of the 1893 World's Columbian Exposition. As a youth he saw a production of Buffalo Bill's Congress of Rough Riders of the World show – probably the one installed adjacent to the Exposition – which nourished his love of the Western pioneer and Native American cultures.

His work included advertising, While in Philadelphia, Hinton developed the tobacco advertising character Velvet Joe for Liggett & Myers. Although he never received credit, it was Hinton who suggested Joe should resemble Mark Twain. outdoors magazines, illustrations for pulp magazines such as Mammoth Western and Western Story, magazine covers for Sports Afield, Outdoor Life, Dairy Farmer, and Successful Farming, as well as illustrations of John Deere Tractors. Much of his calendar work ended up on puzzles. Artist Reviews.

== Rediscovery ==
In 1988, a young new CEO named Robert Newman stumbled upon 24 paintings stashed in a storeroom at the company's headquarters. Awed and curious, he began asking where they came from, what they were for, and who made them. Robert Newman's interest, and that of his father Ervin Newman, led to a major retrospective exhibition in 1993, held at the Ewing Gallery of the University of Tennessee. It was the first ever exhibition of Walter Haskell Hinton's artwork, and the beginning of a recovery of Hinton's place in the history of American illustration art.

== Magazine covers ==
- Cover Artist: Fruit, Garden and Home magazine July 1924
- Cover Artist: Wild West Weekly October 20, 1934
- Cover Artist: Sports Afield magazine August 1938
- Cover Artist: Sports Afield magazine April 1939
- Cover Artist: Sports Afield magazine June 1940
- Cover Artist: Outdoor Life magazine August 1940
- Cover Artist: Sports Afield magazine January 1941
- Cover Artist: Sports Afield magazine March 1941
- Cover Artist: Outdoor Life magazine May 1941
- Cover Artist: Outdoor Life magazine November 1941
- Cover Artist: Outdoor Life magazine June 1942
- Cover Artist: Mammoth Western Aug 1947
- Cover Artist: Mammoth Western April 1948
- Cover Artist: Mammoth Western September 1949

== Other published works ==
- Interior Artwork: Mammoth Western October 1948
- Interior Artwork: Mammoth Western March 1950
- Interior Artwork: Mammoth Western October 1950
