= Xavier Saint-Just =

French artist, painter and illustrator

Xavier Saint-Just pseud, of Georges Neczpal (age unknown) was a 20th-century French artist, painter and illustrator. He illustrated ads for many of the top magazines during the 1950s and 1960s. He is most widely regarded as a children's book illustrator but also created erotic art under the slight name variation of Xavier Saint-Justh into the 1980s. His whimsical style of art was very influential and is still imitated by illustrators today. Among the best-known of Saint-Just's art works are his Bambi paintings which were commissioned for a children's book by Felix Salten, they have been reproduced on everything from clothes and handbags to cigarette lighters.

== Bibliography ==
- Les Cavernes de la Rivière Rouge. (The Caves on the Red River). by Claud Cenac. Published Magnard 1967
- The Mischievous Kitten. by Yvonne Cruwys. Published London, Ward Lock, 1966.
- The Adventures of Bambi. by Felix Salten.
- La Chèvre et Les Biquets - d'après Les Frères Grimm. (The Goats and the Bridge - by the Brothers Grimm). Published France, Bias, 1967
