= Jack Endewelt =

Jack Endewelt (1935–2006) was an illustrator. He was born in New York City and illustrated books and advertisements.

Endewelt began at School of Visual Arts in 1957, completing course work for his certificate in 1960 and his degree in 1984. In 1968, he was appointed to the faculty and then became Co-Chair of the Media Arts Department in 1987 and Chair of the BFA Illustration and Cartooning Department in 1991.

He was married to Barbara Gilbert.

Outside of the college, Endewelt had a prolific career as a freelance illustrator for such book publishers as Dell, Avon, Bantam Books, Time/Life Books, the Franklin Library, Holt, Rinehart and Winston, among others. His work appeared in magazines such as Ladies Home Journal, The Atlantic Monthly, Town Magazine in Britain and Idea Magazine in Japan. Endewelt was also a painter, exhibiting his work in New York City and Trifecta Gallery in Las Vegas, Nevada, where he moved in 2000 after his retirement. Trifecta Gallery would open an exhibit show called "Farewell Jack" later in 2006.
