= Frederick Lowenheim =

American illustrator (1869–1929)

- Born: S. Frederick Lowenheim; August 8, 1869; Berlin, Germany
- Died: November 14, 1929 (aged 60); New Rochelle, New York, U.S.
- Occupation: Illustrator
- Known for: Magazine and children's literature illustration

Frederick Lowenheim (August 8, 1869 – November 14, 1929) was a German-born American illustrator, known for his front-page magazine illustrations of The Country Gentleman and Woman's Home Companion.

== Early life ==
Lowenheim was the son of Adolph Aaron Loewenheim (1839–1901) and Ernestine Heymann Loewenheim (1836–1889). His father, Adolph, was a rabbi.

== Education and career ==
Lowenheim came to the United States around 1885. He had previously received training in Berlin and later trained at The Art Institute of Chicago in Chicago, Illinois.

Lowenheim was a storybook illustrator whose work often depicted children in amusing situations. He illustrated fifteen magazine covers for The Country Gentleman.

He maintained a studio in Manhattan in New York City, but lived in New Rochelle, New York. He worked for the George L Dyer Company.

Some of Lowenheim's storybook illustrations were:

- His Friend the Enemy by William Wallace Cook (featured six illustrations)
- Molly and her Brothers by Mabel Earle
- New Fortunes by Mabel Earle
- The Motor Maid by Charles Norris and Alice Murial Williamson (with three color illustrations)

Some of Lowenheim's magazine cover illustrations were:

- The Country Gentleman, July 1, 1922 (Children in Costumes)
- The Country Gentleman, July 29, 1922 (Lady in a Car)
- The Country Gentleman, August 26, 1922 (Boys Crossing Fence)
- The Country Gentleman, September 2, 1922 (Look Out, Vicious Bull)
- The Country Gentleman, September 30, 1922 (Boy with Apples Caught on Barbed Wire)
- The Country Gentleman, October 28, 1922 (Girl Looking for Future Husband in Mirror)
- The Country Gentleman, November 25, 1922 (Turkey Chasing Boy in Indian Costume)
- The Country Gentleman, December 23, 1922 (Santa Coming Down the Chimney)
- The Country Gentleman, December 30, 1922 (Baby with Seed Catalog 1923)
- The Country Gentleman, February 10, 1922 (Cupid Takes Aim)
- The Country Gentleman, March 17, 1923 (Going Planting)
- The Country Gentleman, March 31, 1923 (Paris Fashions for Easter)
- The Elks Magazine, June 1, 1923
- The Country Gentleman, June 9, 1923 (Pedal Car at Gas Pump)
- The Country Gentleman, July 14, 1923 (Watering the Elephant)
- The Country Gentleman, December 22, 1923 (Santa Overhears Children)
- The Country Gentleman, December 19, 1923 (Good Road Ahead)

== Psrsonal life ==
Lowenheim married Gertrude Rosenfield of Illinois. They had one son, Frederick Adolph Lowenheim (1909–1980), who was a writer and expert on electroplating.

== Examples of Loweheim's work ==
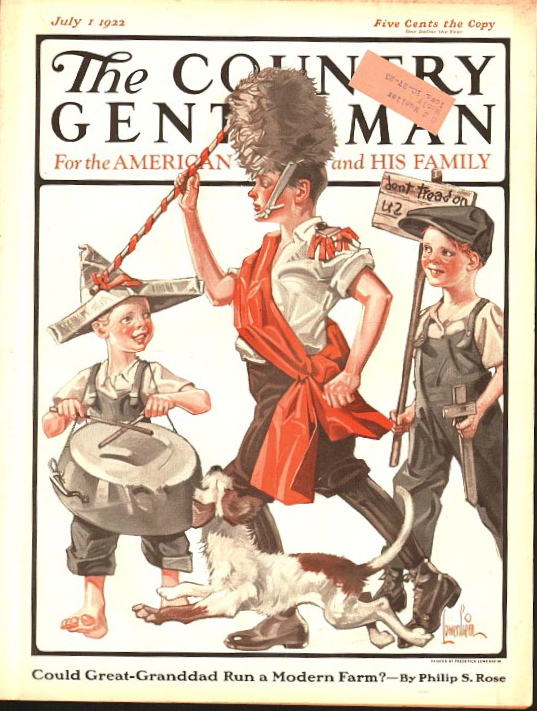
Cover of The Country Gentleman, July 1, 1922

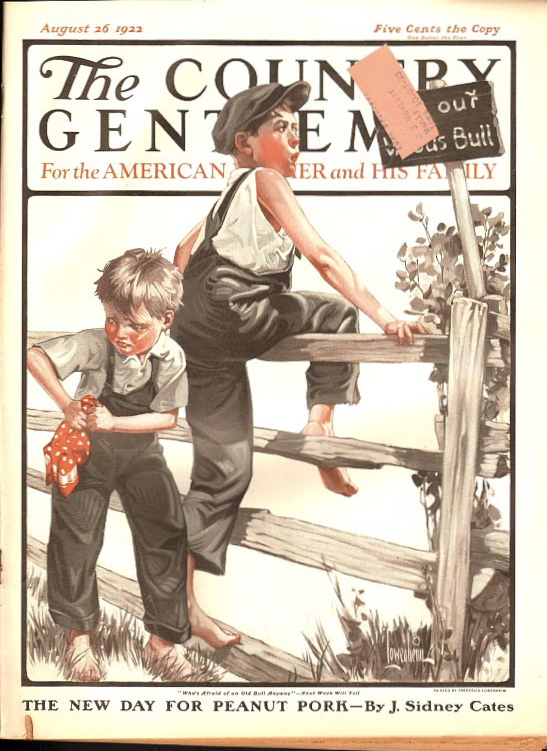
Cover of The Country Gentleman, August 26, 1922

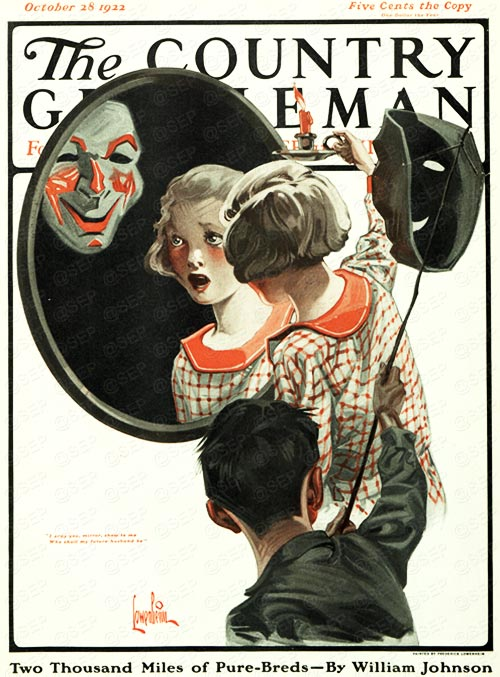
Cover of The Country Gentleman, October 28, 1922

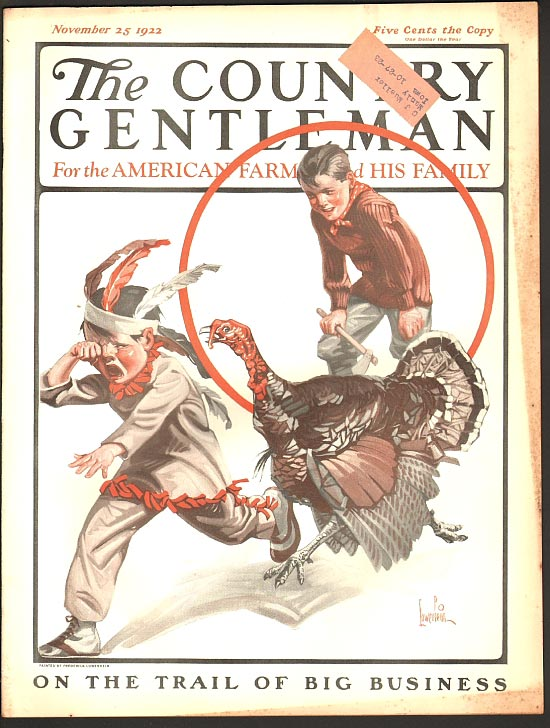
Cover of The Country Gentleman, November 25, 1922

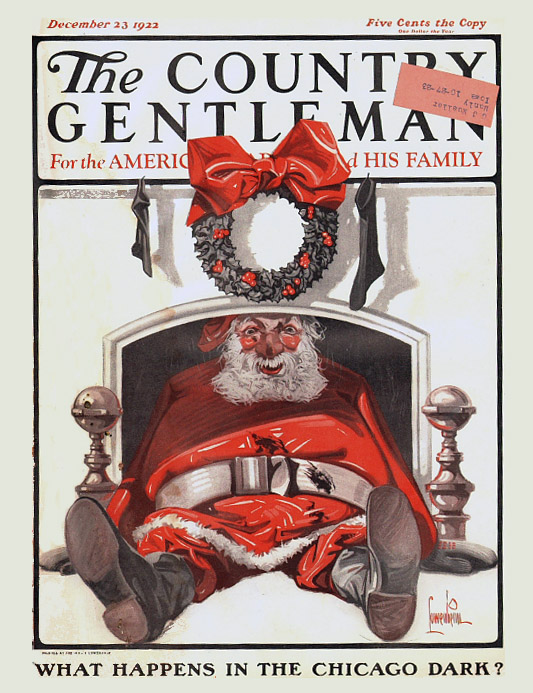
Cover of The Country Gentleman, December 23, 1922

== See also ==
- The Country Gentleman magazine covers at magazineart.org
- Lowenheim illustrations at The FictionMags Index
