= Eric Winter (illustrator) =

British illustrator (1905–1981)

- Born: 15 May 1905
- Died: 1981 (aged 75–76)
- Occupation: Illustrator

Eric Winter (15 May 1905 – 1981) was a children's illustrator, most notable for his contributions to Ladybird books. Before his work for Ladybird Books, he worked on commission, producing work for Eagle, Swift and Girl magazines.
