= Catherine Haussard =

French scientific illustrator

Catherine Haussard, born in 1746 in Paris and died in 1791, was a French engraver and cartographer.

== Biography ==
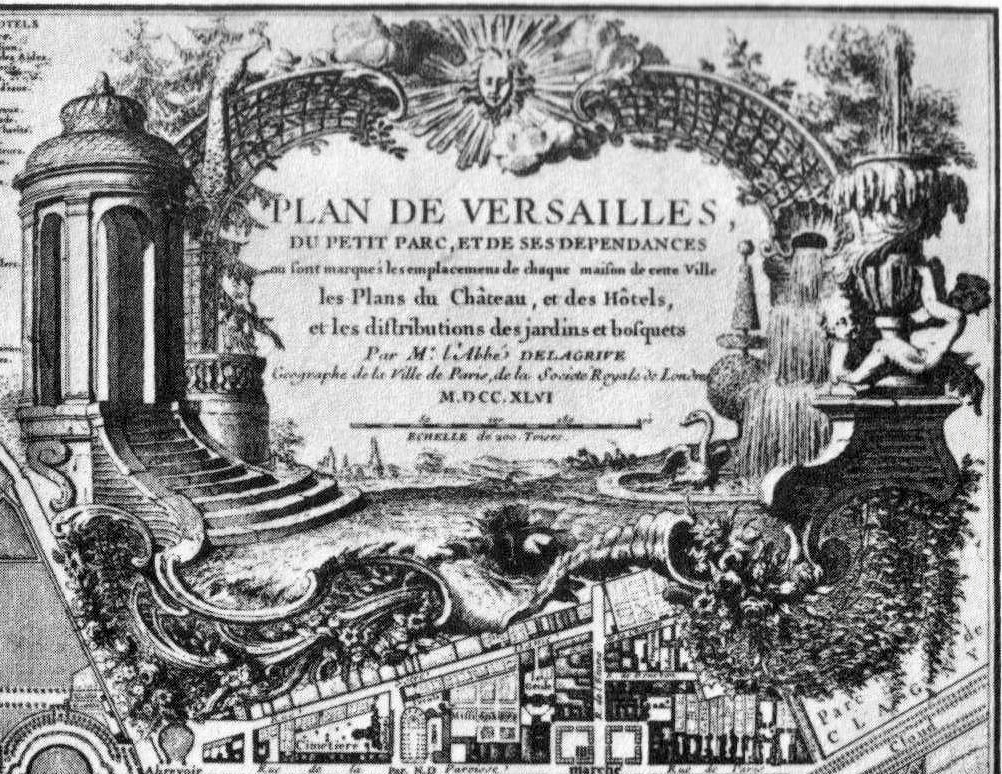
Example of a cartouche from a 1746 map of the Versailles Palace.

Marie Catherine Haussard was the eldest daughter of the engraver Jean-Baptiste Haussard. She worked with her younger sister and fellow illustrator Elisabeth Haussard in the illustration of scientific and technical works and lived in Paris during the third quarter of the 18th century.

According to Bliss, the sisters Catherine and Elizabeth Haussard became recognized for their engravings of “cartouches” — the fancy label on a map that shows the location and author, very often decorated with the map's subject and author. For example, a map of Eastern Canada, signed by “C. Haussard,” shows a cartouche that displays a few of the popular symbols of wilderness forests: a beaver, canoe and pine trees. Although the sisters had learned cartography from their father, they became successful because of their own skills and talents.

At the time, the women working in map-making often signed their work using their initials, not names, and received little acknowledgment.

== Partial iconography ==
- Henri Louis Duhamel du Monceau, Description of the arts and crafts: The Art of the Locksmith, Paris, Chez Saillant & Nyon,1767, 302 p., with 42 plates including seven engraved by Catherine Haussard.
- Jean Antoine Nollet, Description of arts and crafts: The art of making hats, Paris, Chez Saillant & Nyon,1765, 94 p., with six plates including two engraved by Catherine Haussard.
- André-Jacob Roubo, Description of Arts and Crafts: The Art of the Carpenter, Paris, Chez Saillant & Nyon, 1769–1775, 1312 p. with 382 plates including plates 21 and 22 engraved by Catherine Haussard.
- Jean-Jacques Perret, Description of arts and crafts: The Art of the Cutler, Paris, Chez Saillant & Nyon,1761, 239 pp., with 72 plates including ten engraved by Catherine Haussard.

== Selected gallery ==
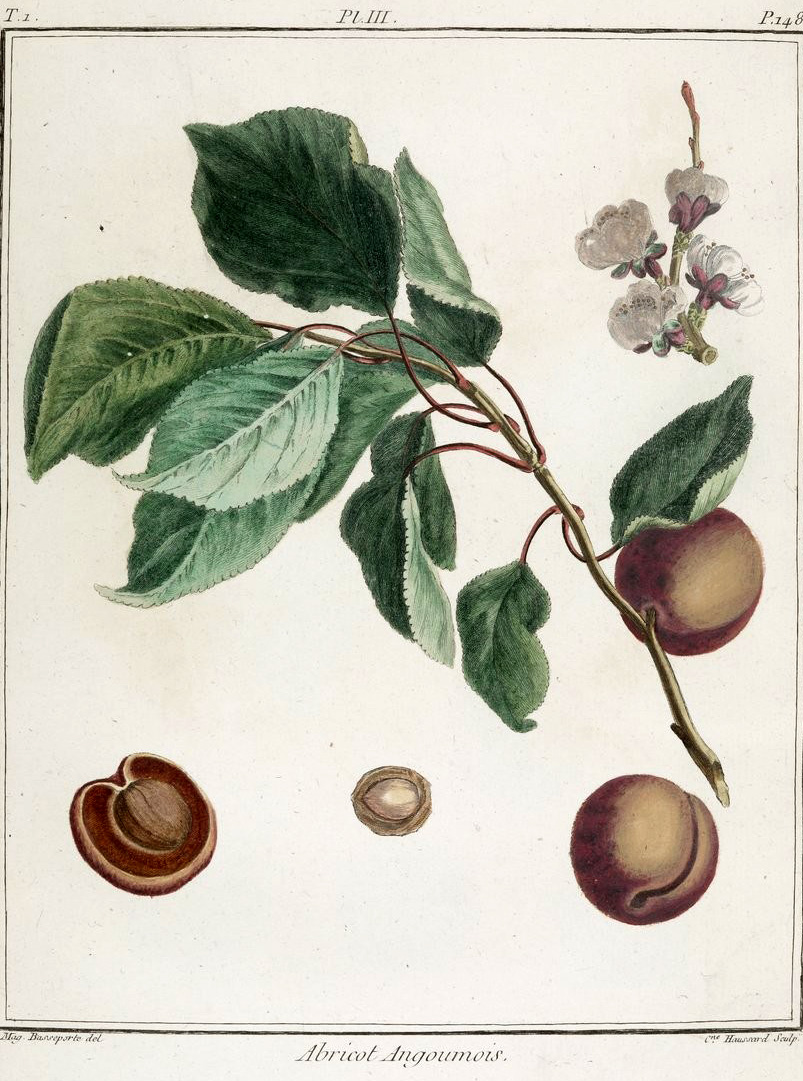

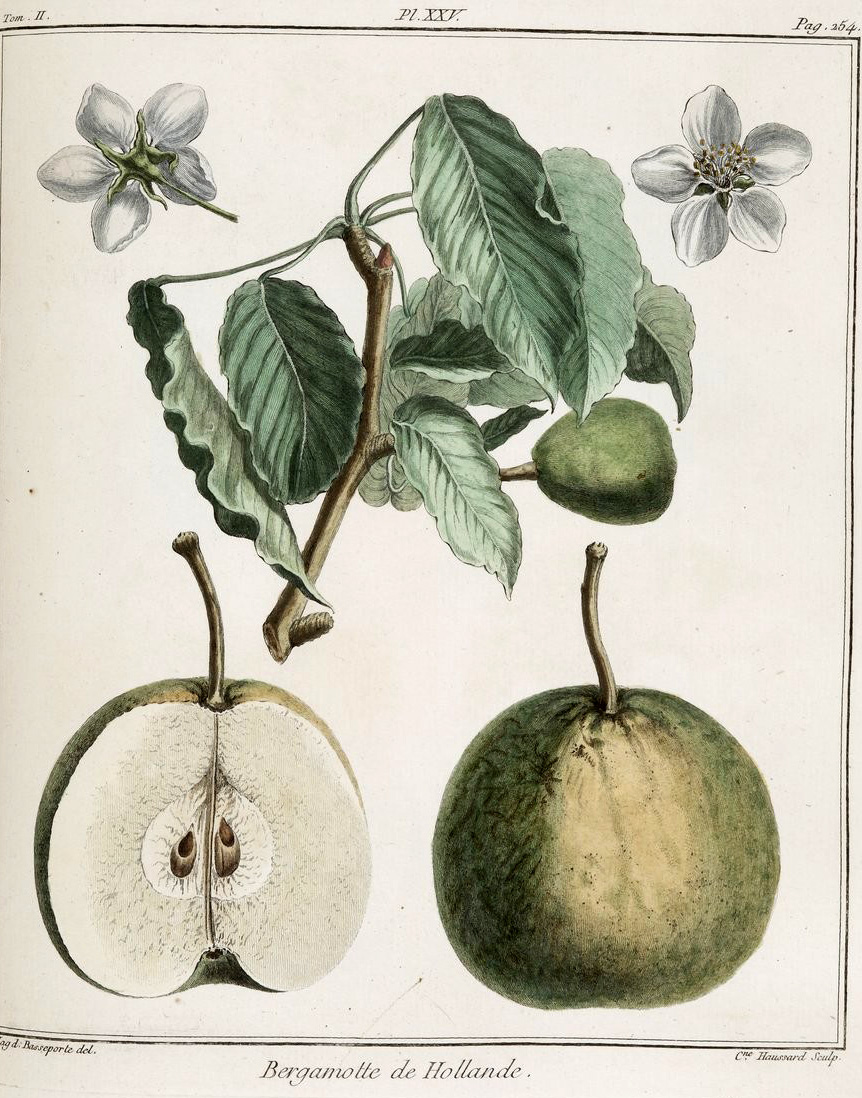

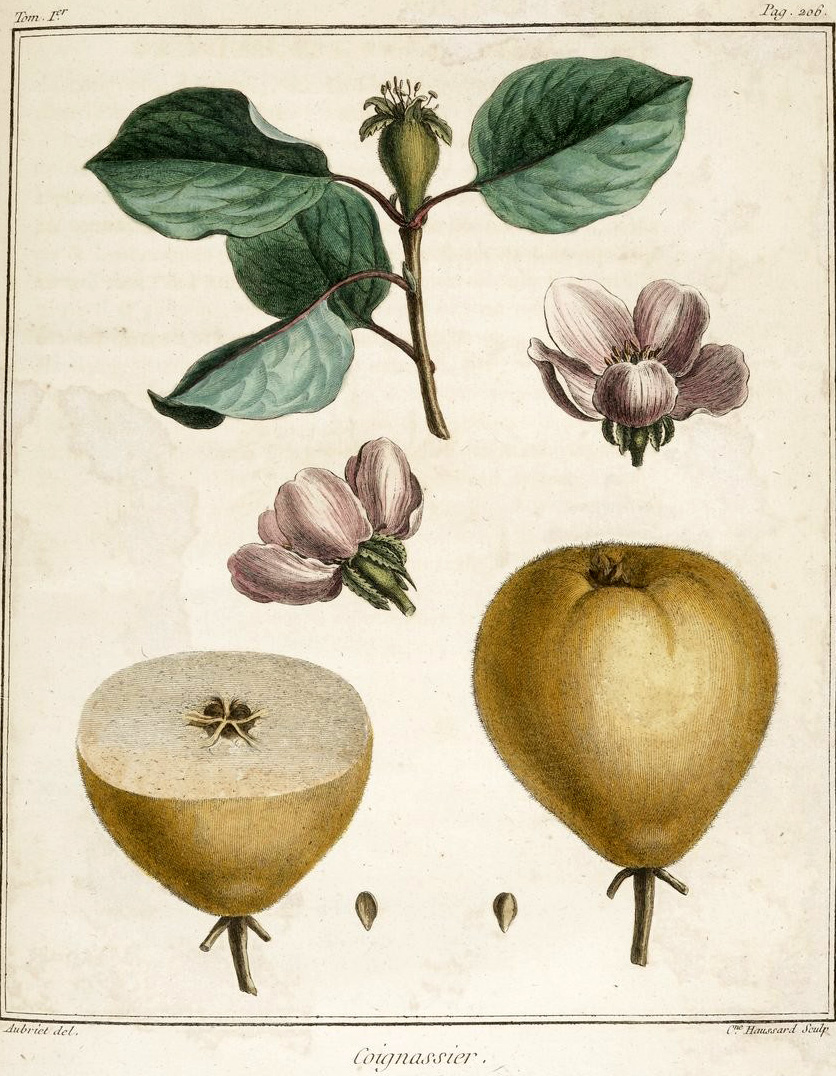

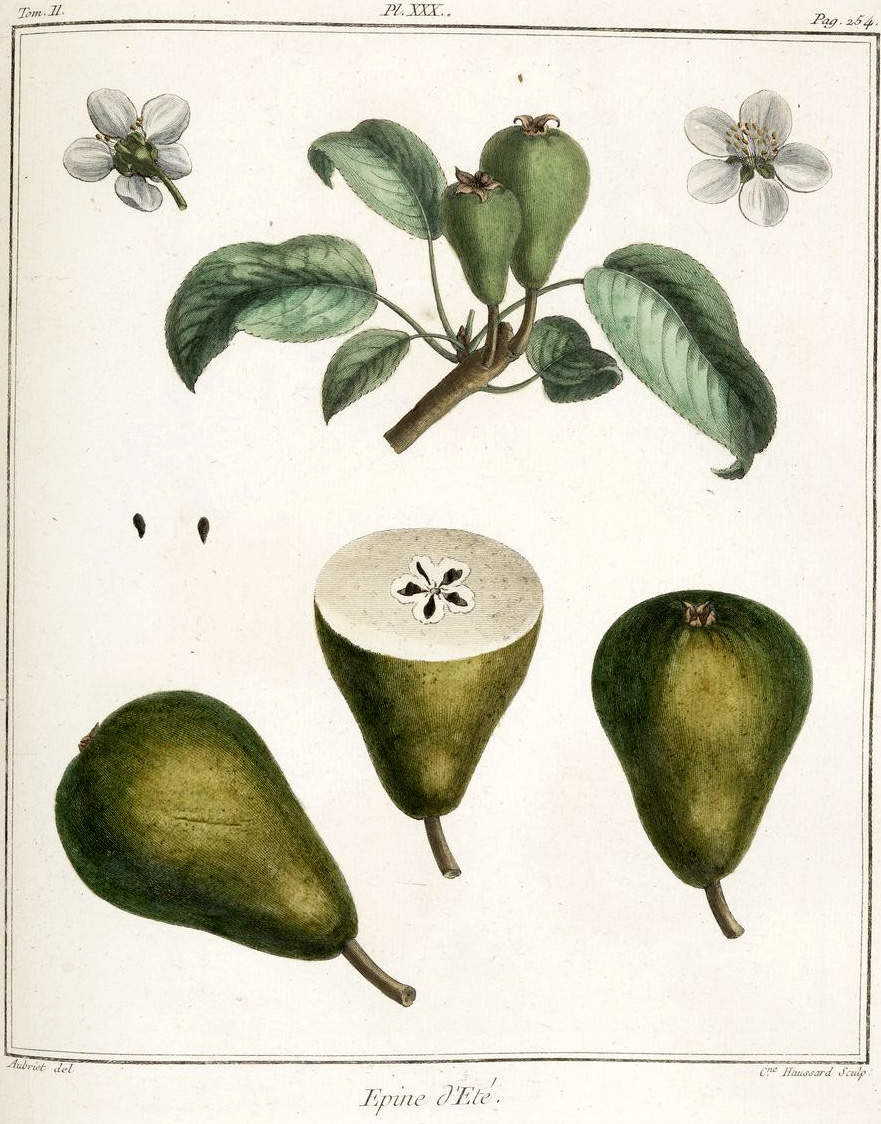

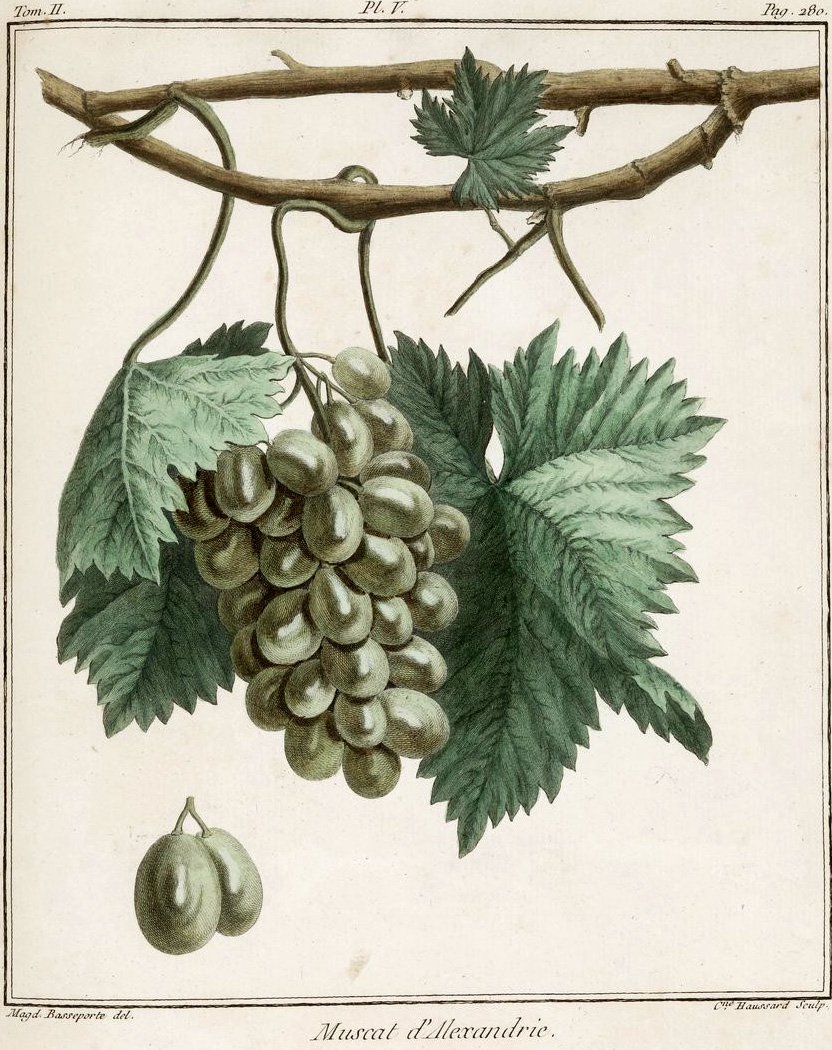

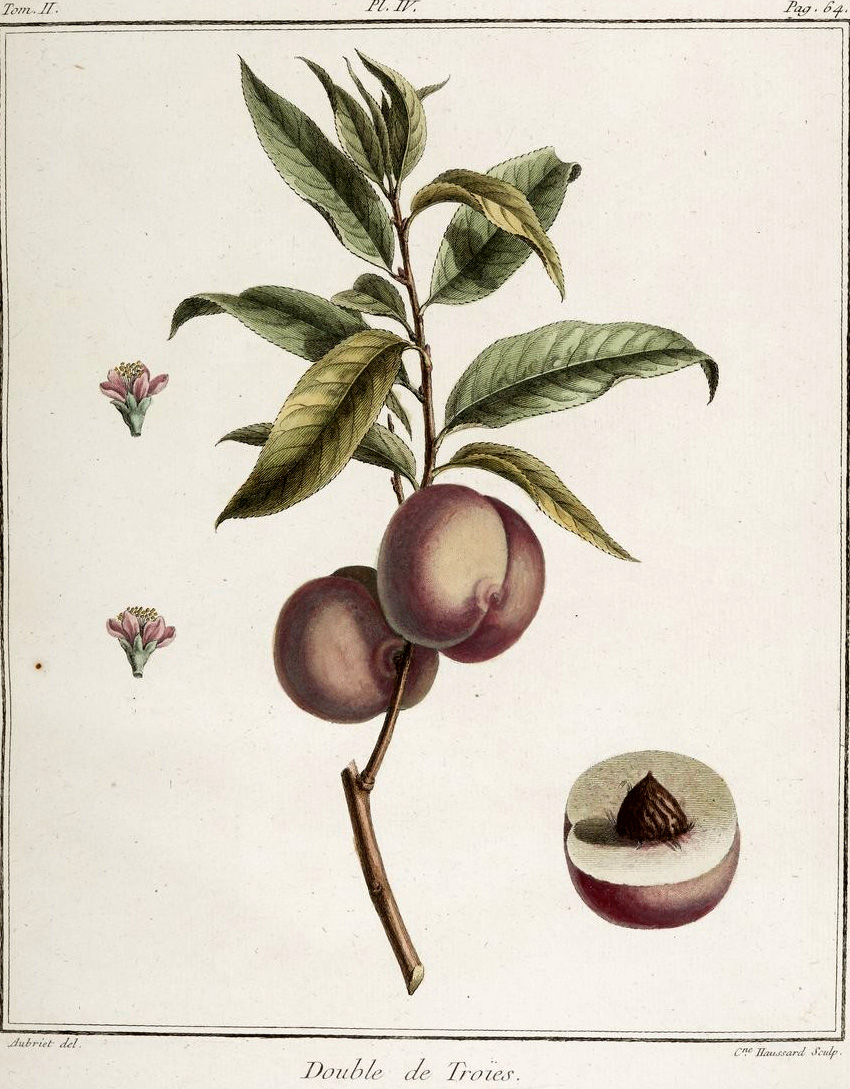

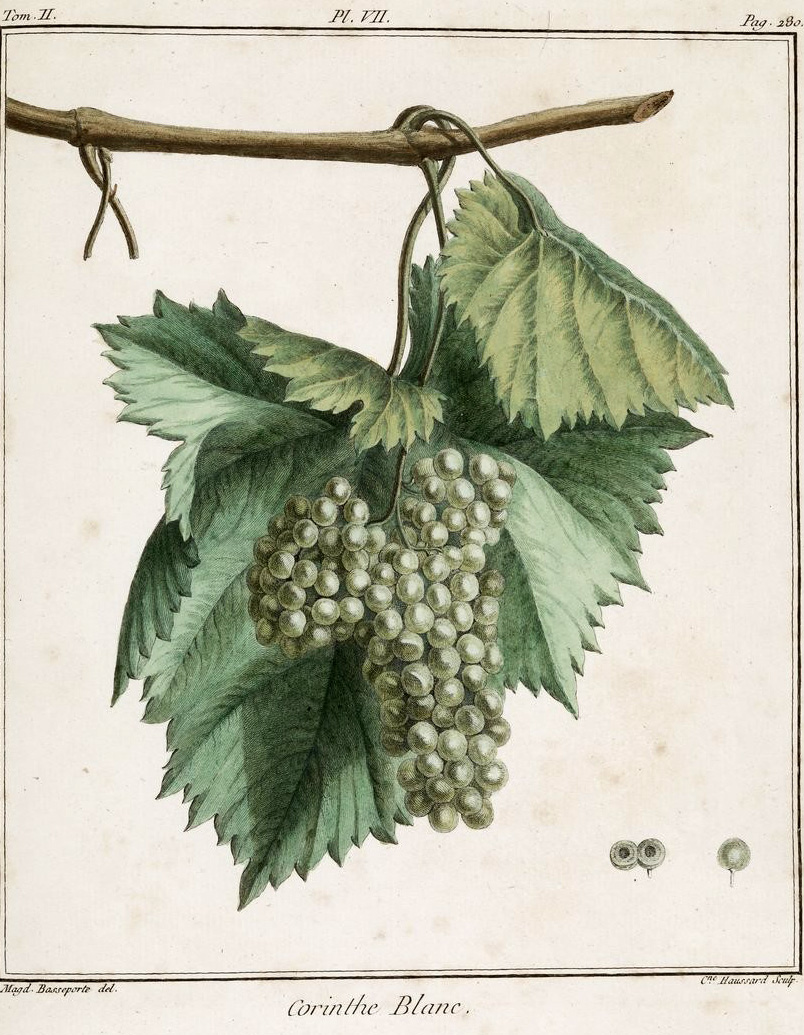
