= Sergio Burzi =

Italian painter

- Born: October 1901; Bologna, Italy
- Died: 1954; Bologna
- Occupations: Painter, illustrator

Sergio Burzi (1901 – 1954), was an Italian painter and illustrator. He was a versatile artist, specialised in the illustration of magazines and children's books, as well as a creative watercolour painter of landscapes and marine subjects.

Afflicted by mental illness, at 27 he was hospitalised in a mental health clinic, where he continued to draw his surroundings, ambience and people. Discharged in 1934, Burzi resumed his artistic activity in his studio in Bologna, concentrating on the daily city life and its characters, often viewing them from his studio window. His mental problems, however, accompanied him throughout his life, also affecting his artistic output.

Burzi was well esteemed by Italian art critics, who often praised his work on fine art magazines and catalogues.

== Gallery ==
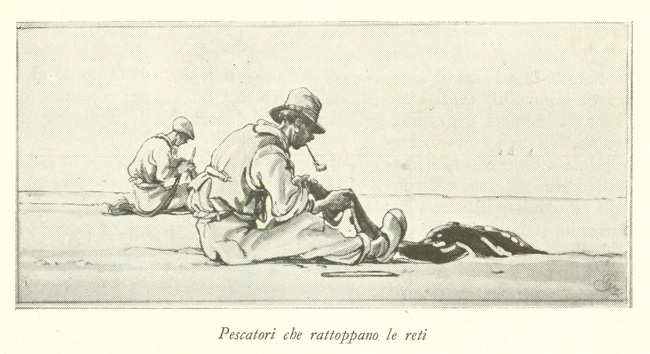
Anglers mending nets

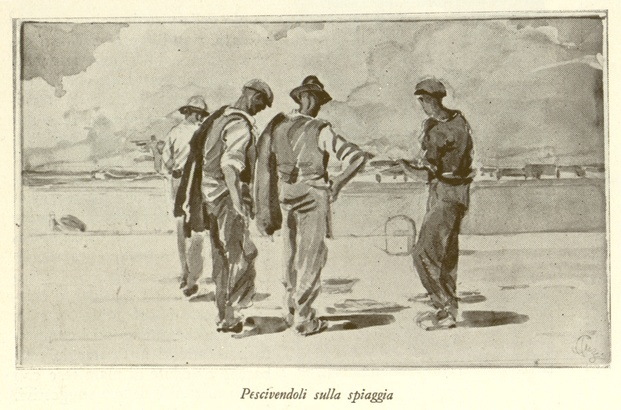
Fishmongers on the shore

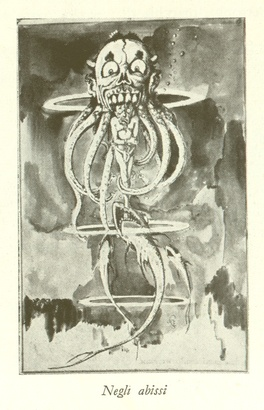
In the abyss

== Bibliography ==
- Cinti, Italo, Quarto e quinto quaderno Ratta, Comune di Bologna, XXII, n. 2 (1935)
- Cristofori, Franco, Bologna come rideva, Milan (1957)
- Pallottino, Paola, Regesto dei periodici esposti, Catalogue of the Exhibition "La Metafisica: gli Anni Venti", Franco Solmi e Renato Barilli eds., vol. II, Bologna (1980)
- Pelliccioni, Armando, Un disegnatore di eccezione, Comune di Bologna, XXIII, n. 1 (1935)
- Ratta, Cesare, Gli adornatori del libro in Italia, vol. II, Bologna (1925)
- Signo, La mostra "Francesco Francia", La Battaglia, II, n. 22, Bologna (1982)
- Treves, Eugenio, Libri italiani per ragazzi, Lidel, VII, n. 12, Milan (1925)
- Vianelli, Athos, "Catalogo per la mostra retrospettiva", Galleria L'Ariete, Bologna (1980)
