= Charles M. Relyea =

American illustrator (1863–1932)

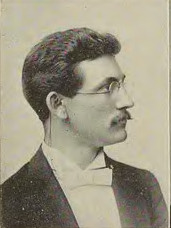
- Born: Charles Mark Relyea; April 23, 1863
- Died: June 17, 1932 (aged 69)

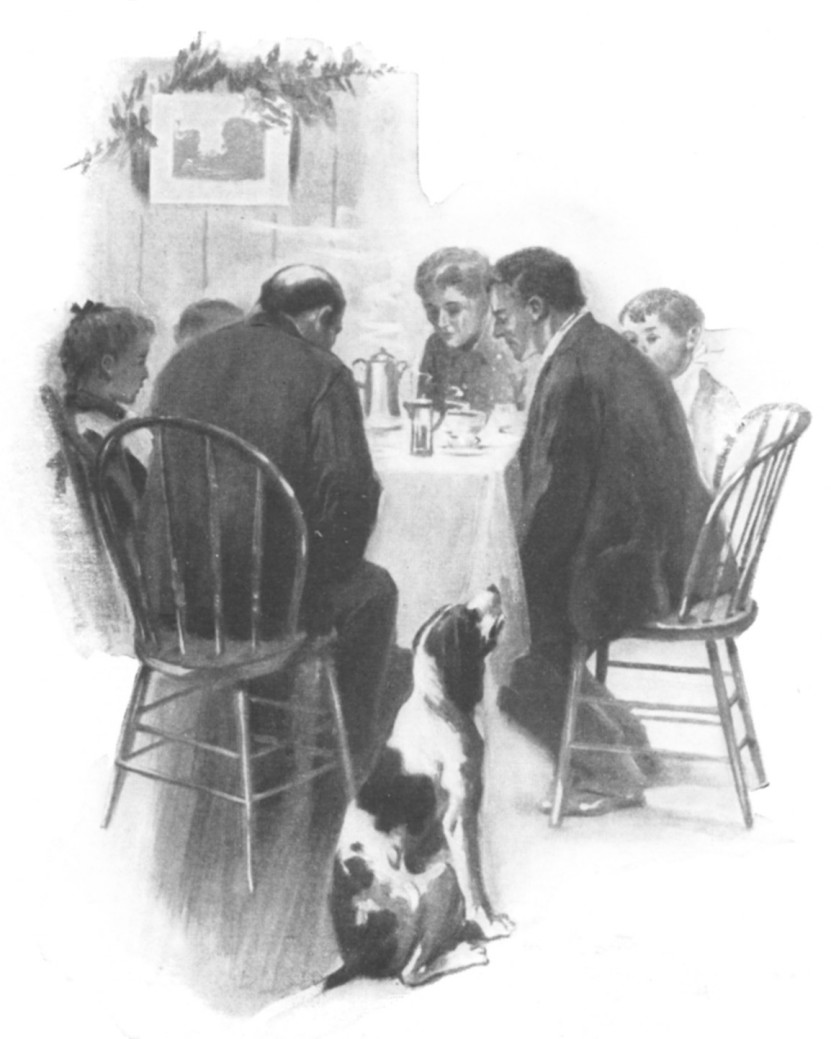
One of Charles M. Relyea's illustrations for A Defective Santa Claus by James Whitcomb Riley

Charles Mark Relyea (April 23, 1863 – Jun 17, 1932) was an American illustrator whose work appeared in magazines and popular novels in the late 19th and early 20th centuries.

== Life and career ==
Relyea was a native of Albany, New York, and spent most of his early years in Rochester. He studied art under Thomas Eakins at the Pennsylvania Academy of the Fine Arts and under Frank Vincent DuMond at the Art Students League in New York City before completing his training in Paris. After returning to the United States, he made his home in New Rochelle, New York.

His illustrations appeared in the children's magazine St. Nicholas, as well as magazines for broader audiences, such as Munsey's.

In 1897, a publishing house chose Relyea to illustrate The Rubáiyát of Doc Sifers, Hoosier poet James Whitcomb Riley's poem satirizing The Rubaiyat of Omar Khayyam. Because Relyea was not from Indiana, Riley insisted that he visit the state before making his drawings, to ensure that he would not misrepresent Indiana or caricature its residents.

== Personal life ==
Relyea was married in 1892. His wife Eloise divorced him in 1920, winning alimony of $25 per week. After the marriage collapsed, she remained in New Rochelle and he was reported to be living in his studio in the Bronx.

== Selected works ==
Books with illustrations by Charles M. Relyea include:

- The Rubáiyát of Doc Sifers (James Whitcomb Riley, 1897)
- Standard First Reader (1902), published by Funk & Wagnalls
- Children of the Tenements (Jacob A. Riis, 1903)
- A Defective Santa Claus (James Whitcomb Riley, 1904)
- Her Brother's Letters (Anonymous, 1906)
- The Edge of Hazard (George Horton, published 1906 by Bobbs-Merrill)
- Just Patty (1911)
- Left Tackle Thayer (Ralph Henry Barbour, 1915), Dodd, Mead & Company
- The Slipper Point Mystery (1921)
