= Henri Thiriet =

French artist (1873–1946)

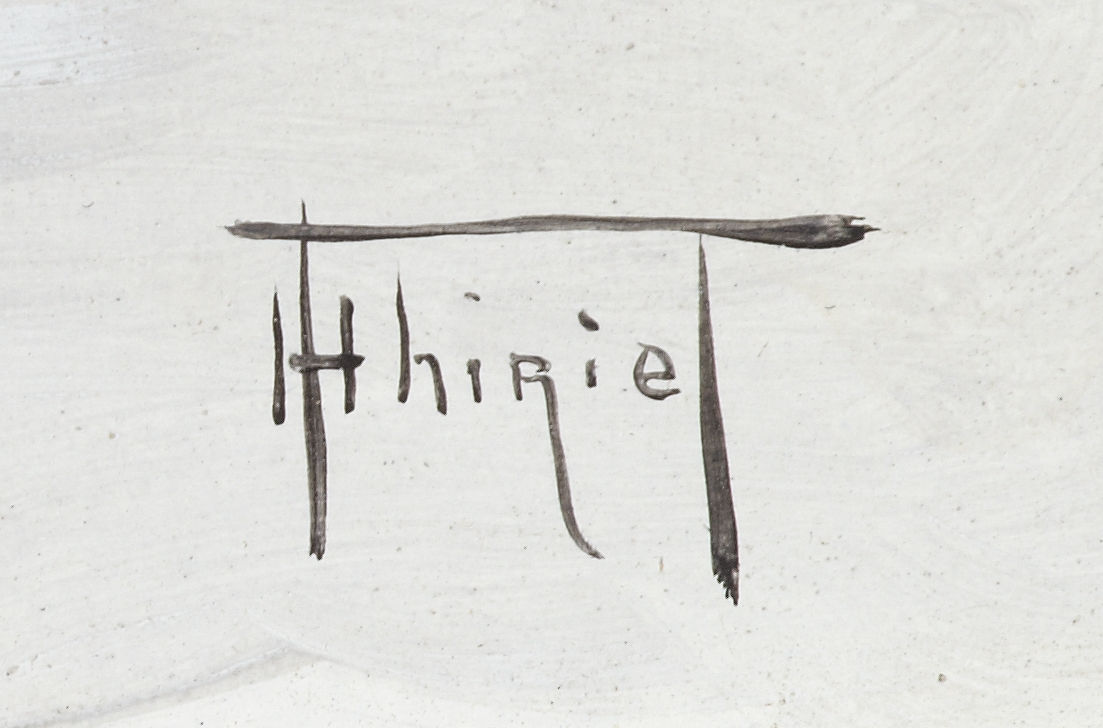
- Born: 1873; Épinal
- Died: 1946 (aged 72–73); Créteil
- Known for: Poster artist & Book illustrator

Henri Thiriet aka Henry Thiriet (1873-1946) was a prolific French poster artist, book illustrator and painter. Although responsible for many memorable posters, almost nothing is known about Thiriet's life and career. He painted in a flamboyant Art Nouveau style, using its characteristic curves and swirls, and a colourful palette to create imagery bearing his clear stamp. Bicycles and their manufacturers are a recurring subject in his work, and the majority of his posters were designed for Omega, Griffiths and Dayton Cycles.

== Works ==
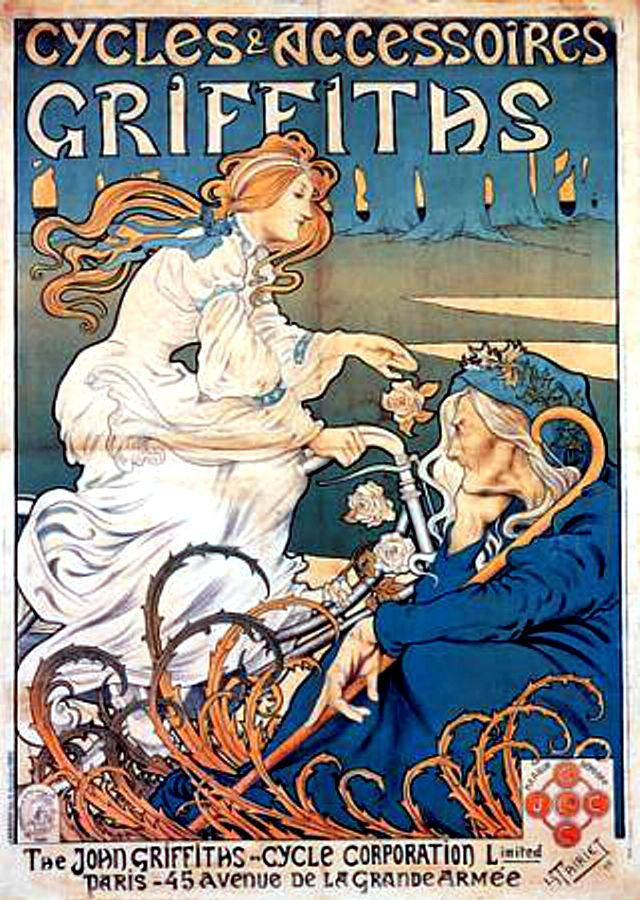
Poster

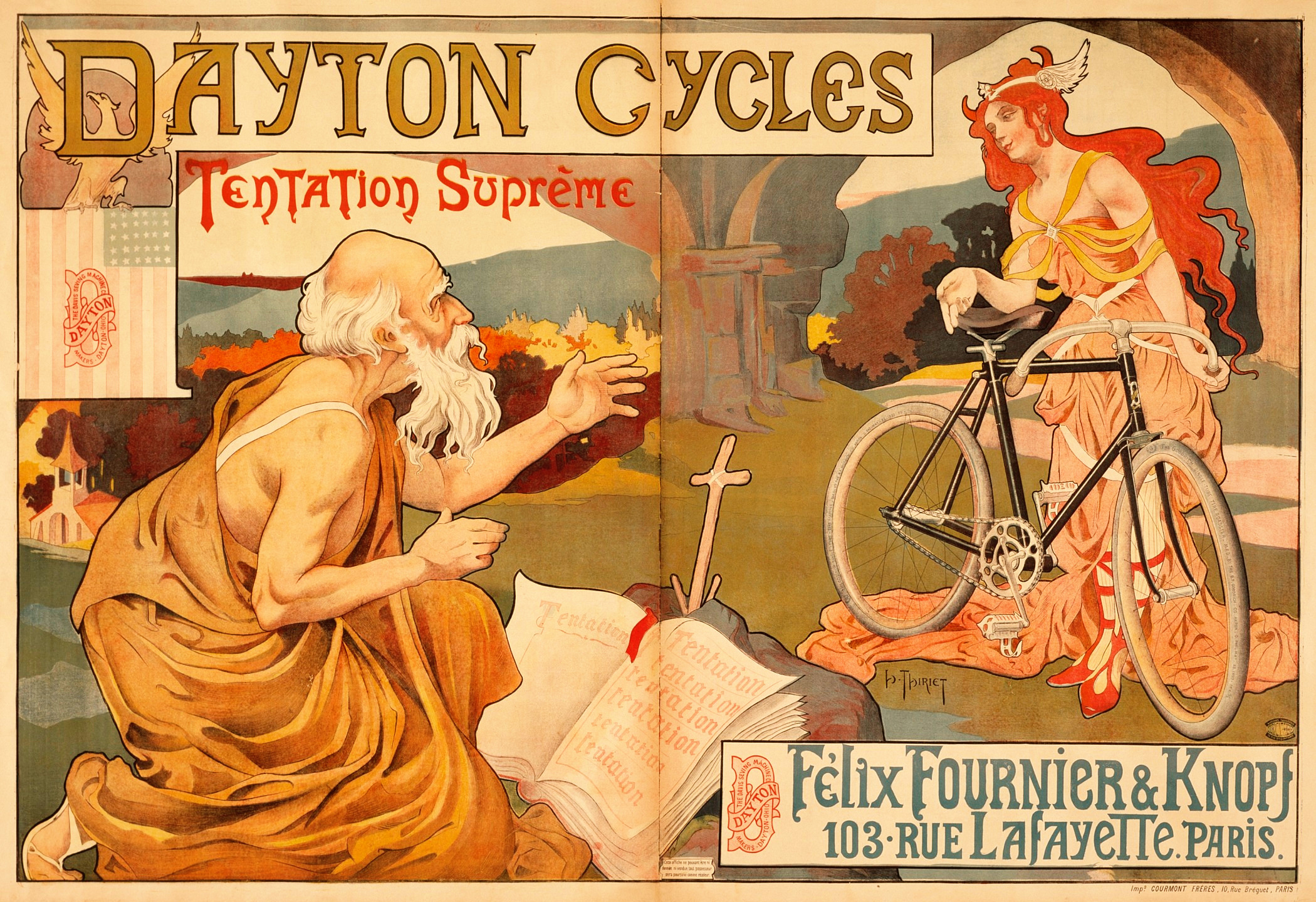
Poster for Dayton Cycles (1898) signed “H. Thiriet”.

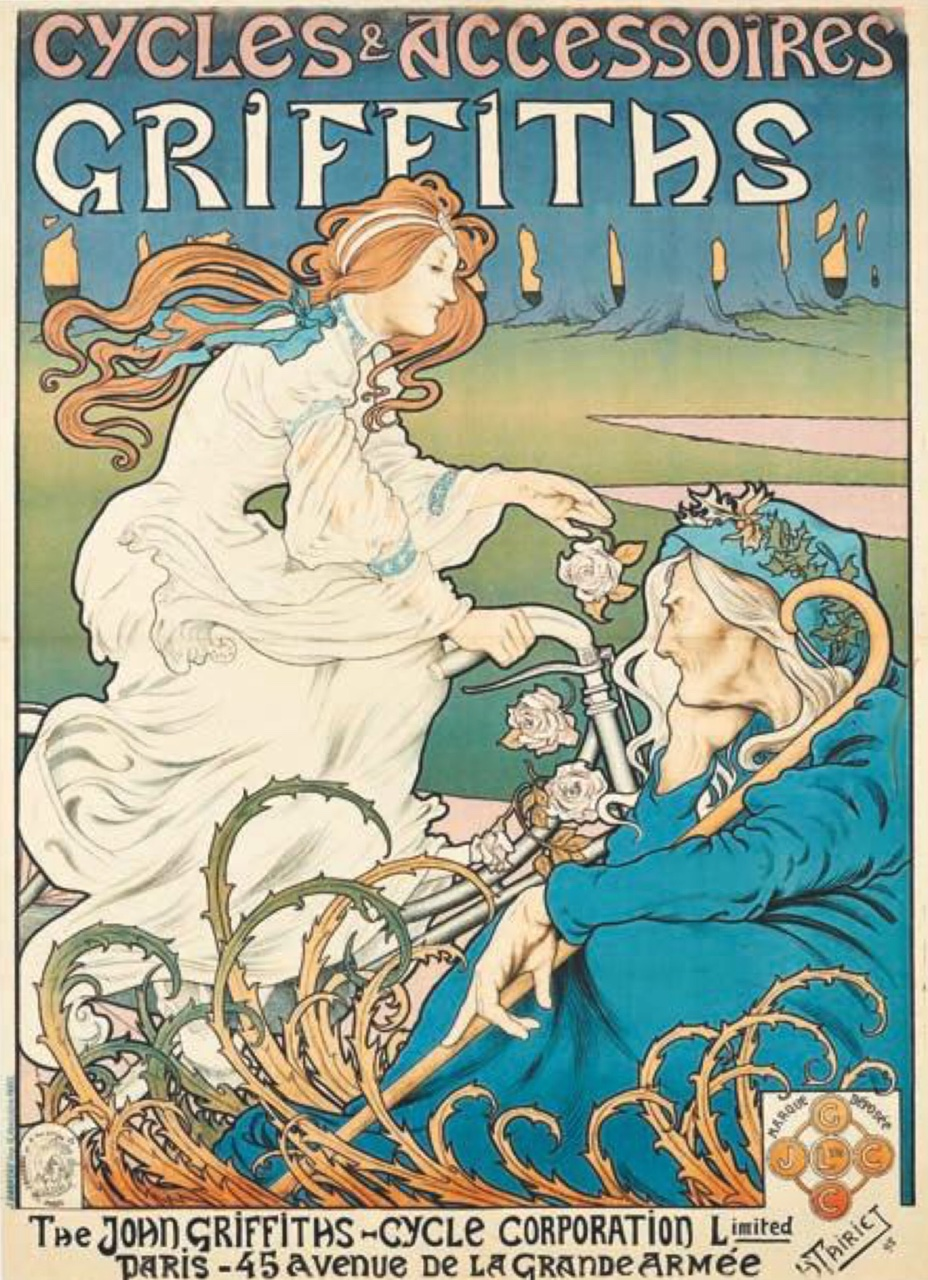
Griffiths, cycles accessoires

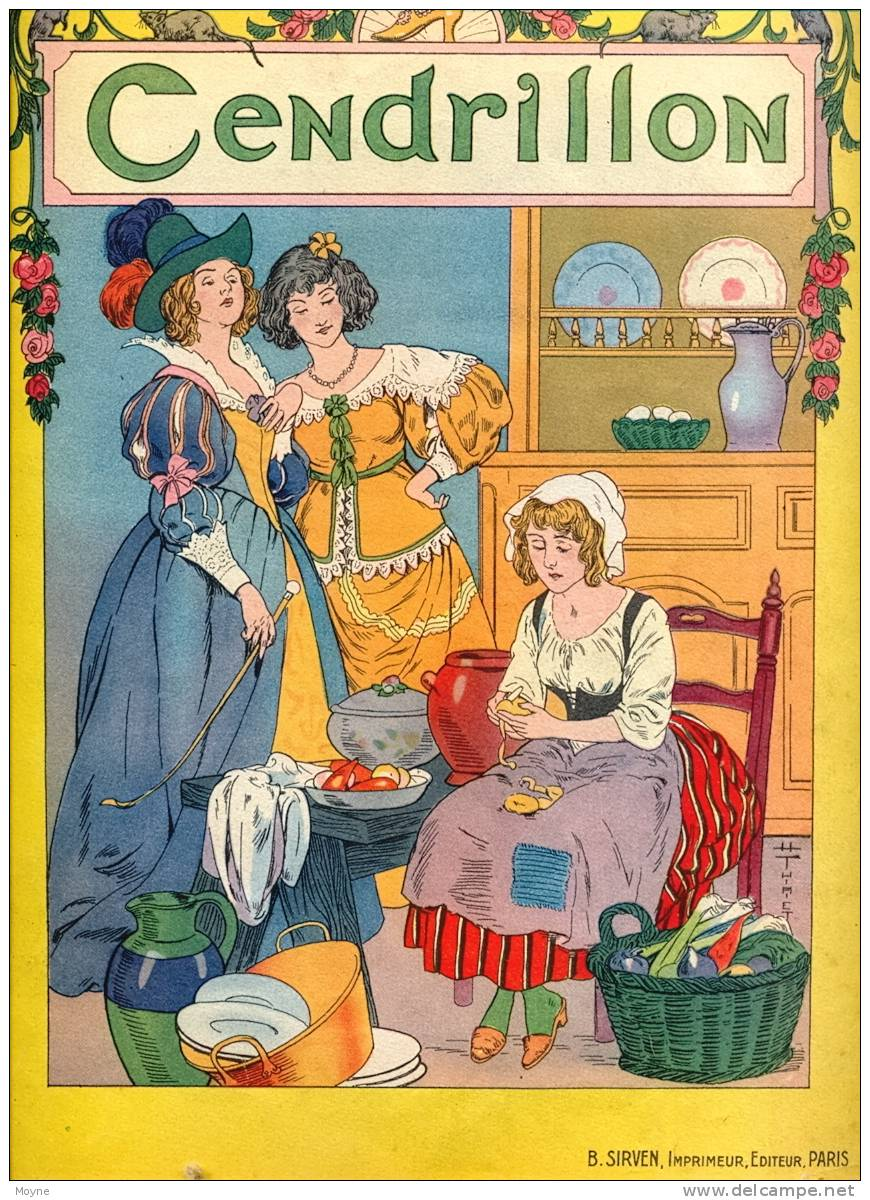
Cinderella illustration

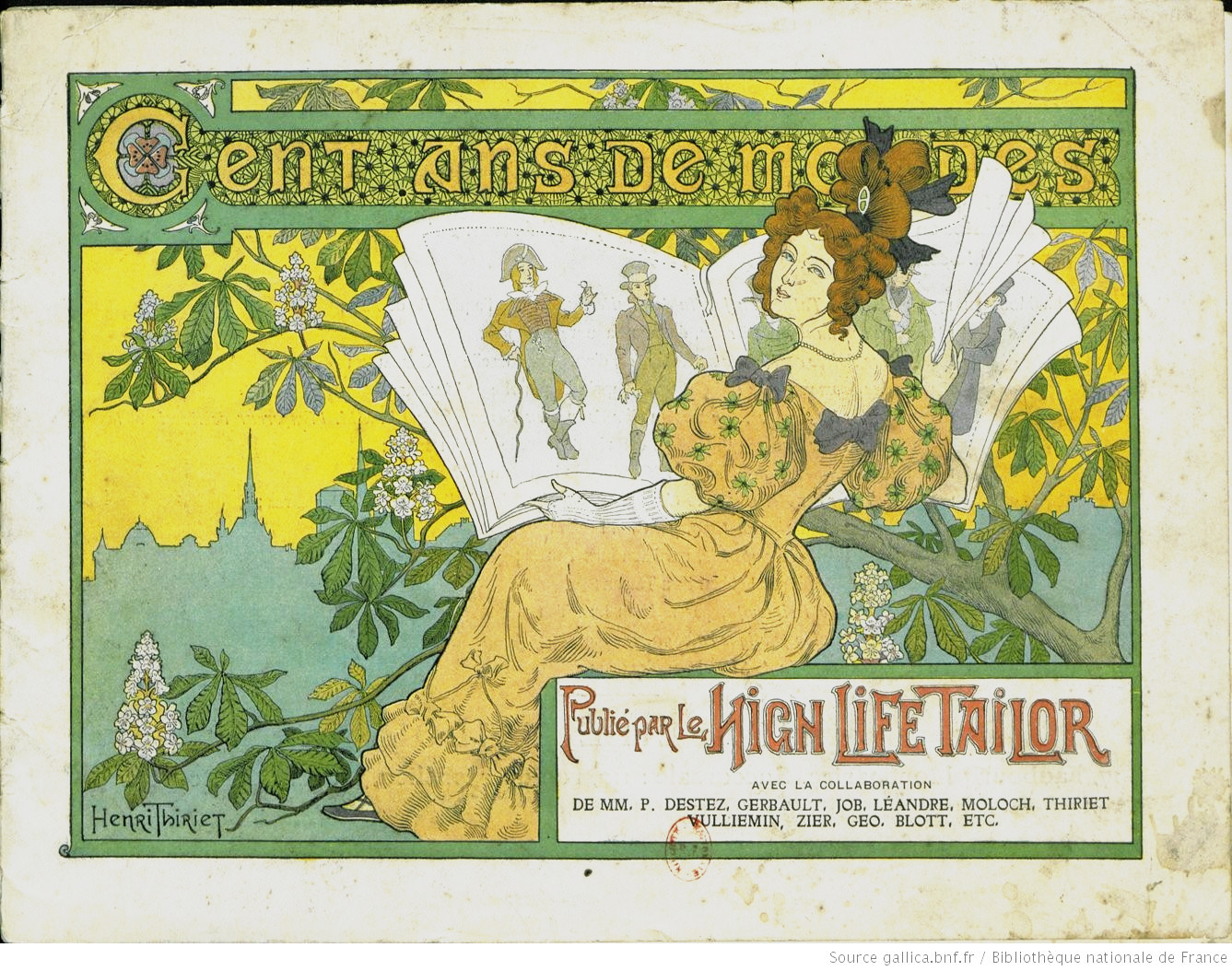
One hundred years of fashion
