= Jason Deeble =

American author/illustrator

- Born: July 11, 1979 (age 46)
- Occupation(s): Author, illustrator
- Years active: 2009-present
- Website: www.jasondeeble.com

Jason Deeble is an American author/illustrator. His first picture book, Sir Ryan's Quest, was published by Roaring Brook Press in 2009. It was later chosen as the One Book, Every Young Child program of southeastern Connecticut's official selection for 2011. Originally from Delaware, Deeble now lives and works in southeastern Connecticut.

== Style and influences ==
Deeble's style draws upon such artists as Winsor McCay and Maurice Sendak creating fantastic creatures and strange environments from ordinarily familiar childhood experiences. These thematic elements appear frequently in Deeble's daily webcomic, Monster Haiku.
