= List of cartoonists =

This is a list of cartoonists, visual artists who specialize in drawing cartoons. This list includes only notable cartoonists and is not meant to be exhaustive. Note that the word 'cartoon' only took on its modern sense after its use in Punch magazine in the 1840s – artists working earlier than that are more correctly termed 'caricaturists',

== Notable cartoonists ==
- Scott Adams, Dilbert
- Charles Addams (1938–1988), macabre cartoons featured in The New Yorker and elsewhere
- Attila Adorjany
- Sarah Andersen, known for Sarah's Scribbles
- Barry Appleby
- Dan Piraro
- Sergio Aragonés, known for his contributions to Mad
- Graciela Aranis (1908–1996), Chilean painter, cartoonist
- Peter Arno (1904–1968), cartoons featured in The New Yorker and elsewhere
- Arotxa (Rodolfo Arotxarena)
- Jim Bamber, cartoonist of Autosport, magazine specialising in motor sports
- Edgar Henry Banger
- Tex Avery, famously known for creating Daffy Duck, The Wolf, Droopy, Screwy Squirrel, and Red.
- Carl Barks, inventor of Duckburg and many of its characters like Scrooge McDuck and Gladstone Gander; Fantagraphics Books called him "the Hans Christian Andersen of comic books."
- Sumanta Baruah
- Aminollah Rezaei
- Niko Barun
- Nancy Beiman, "FurBabies"
- Darrin Bell, Candorville and Rudy Park
- Steve Bell, The Guardian (UK)
- Stephen Bentley, "Herb and Jamaal"
- Jim Benton, known for his cartoons on reddit, GoComics, and Instagram as well as It's Happy Bunny, Dear Dumb Diary, Franny K Stein
- Oscar Berger, Aesop's Foibles (1947); active 1920s–1960s
- Mark Beyer, Amy and Jordan, Agony
- Brumsic Brandon Jr., "Luther"; with his daughter Barbara Brandon-Croft, first family of cartoonists (father/daughter) to each be nationally syndicated in the U.S. mainstream press
- Barbara Brandon-Croft, "Where I'm Coming From"; first Black woman cartoonist to be nationally syndicated in the U.S. mainstream press
- Berkeley Breathed, Bloom County and Outland
- Frédéric-Antonin Breysse
- Ed Brubaker
- Henry Bunbury 18th Century British caricaturist
- Tom Bunk, cartoonist for Mad
- Stanley Burnside, Sideburns
- Mark Burrier
- John Byrne
- Al Capp, Li'l Abner
- Tom Cheney, staff cartoonist for The New Yorker
- Edgar Church
- Chester Commodore, political cartoonist
- George Cruikshank 19th Century British caricaturist
- Isaac Cruikshank 18th Century British caricaturist
- Isaac Robert Cruikshank 19th Century British caricaturist
- Robert Crumb, Mr. Natural, Fritz the Cat, Keep on Truckin'
- Natalie d'Arbeloff
- Jack Davis
- Jim Davis, Garfield
- Abner Dean
- Arifur Rahman
- Narayan Debnath, Indian cartoonist known for Handa Bhonda, Bantul the Great, and Nonte Phonte
- Richard Decker, The New Yorker
- Walt Disney, Mickey Mouse, Donald Duck
- Ralph Waddell Douglass
- Stan Drake
- George du Maurier, also the author of Trilby
- Robert W. Edgren, American political cartoonist known for his "Sketches from Death" from the Spanish–American War
- Will Eisner, The Spirit
- Otto Eppers
- Charles Evenden
- Rupert Fawcett, Fred
- Lyonel Feininger, rare fine artist who did strips, The Kin-der-Kids and Wee Willie Winkie's World
- Rod Filbrandt
- Ellen Forney
- André François
- André Franquin, Spirou et Fantasio, Gaston Lagaffe, Marsupilami
- Yuliy Abramovich Ganf, Soviet Russian
- Eddie Germano
- Denis Gifford, strips in Whizzer and Chips, Knockout, Marvelman
- Carl Giles
- James Gillray, 18th century British, called "the father of the political cartoon".
- John Glashan, Genius
- Rube Goldberg, cartoons of complex and convoluted machines doing very simple tasks.
- Larry Gonick, The Cartoon History of the Universe series, Kokopelli & Company
- Cleven "Goodie" Goudeau, known for his pioneering Afrocentric images on greeting cards
- Jimmy Gownley, Amelia Rules! series, Simon & Schuster
- Bud Grace, "Ernie/Piranha Club"
- Mel Graff, “The Adventures of Patsy”, “Secret Agent X-9”
- Matt Groening, Life in Hell, The Simpsons, Futurama, Disenchantment
- Sam Gross, for his The New Yorker work, plus many other magazines
- Shekhar Gurera, well known for his quirky cartoons about India's political and social trends
- William Haefeli
- Martin Handford, Where's Wally?
- Steven Harris
- Steven Spielberg, Animaniacs, Tiny Toon Adventures, Pinky and the Brain
- Butch Hartman, The Fairly OddParents, T.U.F.F. Puppy, Danny Phantom, Bunsen Is a Beast
- Andrew Kennaway Henderson
- Henfil, Brazilian cartoonist
- Hergé, The Adventures of Tintin
- George Herriman, Krazy Kat
- Herblock American cartoonist
- Watson Heston
- Stephen Hillenburg (1961–2018), SpongeBob SquarePants
- Bill Hinds, "Tank McNamara"
- Dick Hodgins, Jr.
- William Hogarth, English pictorial satirist and editorial cartoonist; credited with pioneering western sequential art; work ranged from realistic portraiture to comic strip
- Bill Holbrook, On the Fastrack, Safe Havens, and Kevin and Kell
- Nicole Hollander, Sylvia
- John Holmstrom
- Geoff "Jeff" Hook, Australian
- George William Houghton, British golf cartoonist
- Jim Hummel
- Edgar Pierre Jacobs, Blake and Mortimer
- Al Jaffee, Mad
- Kirk Jarvinen
- S. Jithesh, World's Fastest Performing Cartoonist
- Herbert Johnson
- Mike Judge, Beavis and Butt-head, King of the Hill, The Goode Family
- Arja Kajermo
- Avi Katz
- Bil Keane, "Family Circus"
- Jeff Keane. "Family Circus"
- Walt Kelly, Pogo
- Rik Kemp
- Molly Kiely
- Wyncie King
- Jeff Kinney, Diary of a Wimpy Kid
- Rick Kirkman, "Baby Blues"
- Heinrich Kley
- B. Kliban
- John Kricfalusi, The Ren & Stimpy Show
- Abril Lamarque
- Gary Larson, The Far Side
- Rick Law, Beyond the Veil
- R K Laxman, cartoonist for The Times of India, India
- Mell Lazarus. "Momma, Miss Peach"
- John Leech, 19th-century Punch cartoonist
- Jonathan Lemon, Alley Oop
- Michael Leunig, Australian
- Arnold Levin
- David Liljemark
- Neil Lonsdale (1907–1989), New Zealand editorial cartoonist
- David Low, New Zealand political cartoonist and caricaturist
- Jay Lynch
- Trey Parker and Matt Stone, South Park
- Seth MacFarlane, Family Guy, American Dad!, The Cleveland Show
- Manjul, India Today, The Economic Times and Daily News and Analysis
- Bob Mankoff, The New Yorker
- Jack Markow
- Don Martin, "Mad"
- Enrico Mazzanti
- Scott McCloud, Zot!, Understanding Comics
- Aaron McGruder, The Boondocks
- Ronald Michaud
- Yevgeniy Migunov
- Mario Miranda, The Economic Times, India
- Guillermo Mordillo
- Arthur Moreland
- Morris, Lucky Luke
- Joe Murray, Rocko's Modern Life and Camp Lazlo!
- Rachel Nabors
- Ogden Nash
- Nigar Nazar, first female cartoonist of the Muslim world, creator of cartoon character "Gogi"
- Roy Nelson
- Richard Newton, 18th century British caricaturist
- Mana Neyestani, Iranian cartoonist
- Ajit Ninan, India Today and The Times of India
- Floyd Norman
- Murray Olderman, sports columnist, author of 14 books, National Cartoonist Society Sports Cartoon Award for 1974 and 1978
- Jack Edward Oliver
- Jackie Ormes, "Torchy Brown in 'Dixie to Harlem", "Candy", "Patty-Jo 'n' Ginger", "Torchy in 'Hearbeats'"; first Black woman cartoonist to be published nationally in the U.S. (not via syndication)
- Bruce Ozella
- Paul Palnik, American Jewish cartoonist
- Gary Panter
- Virgil Franklin Partch, known as "VIP;" leading American gag cartoonist from the 1940s to the 1980s
- Alan Stuart Paterson, New Zealand cartoonist
- Andrea Pazienza
- René Pellos, French cartoonist
- Bob Penuelas, Wilbur Kookmeyer
- Camillus Perera
- Bruce Petty
- Peyo, The Smurfs, Steven Strong, Johan and Peewit
- S. D. Phadnis, Indian cartoonist
- Ziraldo Alves Pinto, Brazilian cartoonist
- Hugo Pratt, Corto Maltese
- Ken Pyne
- Quino (Joaquín Salvador Lavado), Argentine cartoonist and social satirist, known for Mafalda
- Jacki Randall
- Roy Raymonde, 20th Century English cartoonist whose work appeared principally in Punch (magazine) and Playboy
- Bob Rich, American award-winning cartoonist
- Danny Antonucci, Canadian animator famous for the animated show Ed, Edd n Eddy
- Pat Ventura, cartoonist who created various animated cartoon shorts for Nickelodeon and Cartoon Network
- Maxwell Atoms, the creator of The Grim Adventures of Billy & Mandy
- W. Heath Robinson, British satirist known for drawings of convoluted machines, similar to Rube Goldberg
- Christine Roche
- Artie Romero
- Ed "Big Daddy" Roth
- Thomas Rowlandson 18th Century British caricaturist
- Martin Rowson British political cartoonist
- Øystein Runde
- Malik Sajad Indian cartoonist, author of graphic novel Munnu - A Boy from Kashmir'
- Armando Salas
- Gerald Scarfe ( political)
- Jerry Scott, "Baby Blues, Zits"
- Ronald Searle, St Trinians, Molesworth, The Rake's Progress, editorial work
- Elzie Crisler Segar, Popeye
- Sempé
- Claude Serre
- James Affleck Shepherd
- Lee Sheppard
- Gilbert Shelton
- Mahmoud Shokraye
- Shel Silverstein
- Posy Simmonds, The Silent Three of St Botolph's, Gemma Bovery
- Siné
- Vishavjit Singh
- Jeff Smith, Bone, RASL, Shazam!: The Monster Society of Evil, Little Mouse Gets Ready
- Mauricio de Sousa, Monica's Gang, Chuck Billy 'n' Folks, The Cavern Clan
- Art Spiegelman, author of Maus; co-editor of RAW magazine
- Dan Spiegle
- George Sprod, Punch and other publications
- Ralph Steadman, editorial cartoonist and book illustrator
- Ralph Stein
- Saul Steinberg
- Jay Stephens
- Matt Stone, with Trey Parker, co-creator of South Park
- Jakob Martin Strid
- Ed Subitzky, known for his National Lampoon work, also The New York Times
- Joost Swarte, Dutch comic artist known for his ligne claire or clear line style of drawing
- Betty Swords
- Les Tanner, political cartoonist
- Howard Tayler, pioneered web-cartooning as a profession
- Raina Telgemeier
- John Tenniel, chief cartoonist for Punch from 1864 to 1901.
- Bal Thackeray, formed a political party in India
- Lefred Thouron
- Garry Trudeau, Doonesbury
- Morrie Turner, credited with the first multicultural syndicated cartoon strip
- Albert Uderzo, Asterix
- Jim Unger, Canadian cartoonist: Herman
- Willy Vandersteen, Spike and Suzy, De Rode Ridder
- Joan Vizcarra
- Vicco von Bülow, Loriot
- Keith Waite, New Zealand-born English editorial cartoonist
- Mort Walker, Beetle Bailey, Hi and Lois
- Arthur Watts
- Ben Wicks, Canadian cartoonist and illustrator: The Outsider, Wicks
- S. Clay Wilson, Zap Comix, Underground Comix
- Shannon Wright
- Rhie Won-bok
- Bianca Xunise, "Six Chix"; first nonbinary cartoonist to be nationally syndicated in the U.S. mainstream press
- Art Young
- José Zabala-Santos
- Zapiro

== Cartoonists of comic strips ==
- Scott Adams, Dilbert
- Alex Akerbladh
- Bill Amend, FoxTrot
- George Baker, Sad Sack
- Tom Batiuk, Funky Winkerbean
- Murray Ball, Footrot Flats
- Darrin Bell, Candorville, Rudy Park
- Stephen Bentley, "Herb and Jamaal"
- Jerry Bittle
- Boulet, pseudonym of French cartoonist Gilles Roussel
- Brumsic Brandon Jr., "Luther"
- Barbara Brandon-Croft, "Where I'm Coming From"
- Berkeley Breathed, Bloom County (1980s American social-political), Outland, Opus
- Dave Breger, Mister Breger
- Dik Browne, Hi and Lois, Hägar the Horrible
- Ernie Bushmiller, Nancy
- Milton Caniff, Terry and the Pirates, Steve Canyon
- Al Capp, Li'l Abner
- Ad Carter, Just Kids
- Jok Church, You Can With Beakman and Jax
- Francis Cleetus, It's Geek 2 Me
- Mitch Clem, Nothing Nice to Say, San Antonio Rock City
- Darby Conley, Get Fuzzy
- Joan Cornellà
- Dave Coverly, Speed Bump
- Max Crivello
- Alex Raymond, Flash Gordon, Jungle Jim, Rip Kirby
- Stan Cross, The Potts
- Stacy Curtis, Cul de Sac
- Lyman Dally, Max Rep
- Harry Grant Dart
- Lou Darvas
- Jim Davis, Gnorm Gnat, Garfield, U.S. Acres, a Mr. Potato Head comic strip
- Reginald Ben Davis
- Billy DeBeck, Barney Google and Snuffy Smith
- Derf Backderf (John Backderf)
- Brad Diller
- J. C. Duffy, The Fusco Brothers
- Edwina Dumm
- Frank Dunne
- Benita Epstein, Six Chix
- Larry Feign, The World of Lily Wong
- Norm Feuti, Retail
- George Fett, Sniffy and Norbert
- Charles Fincher, creator of Thadeus & Weez and The Daily Scribble
- Bud Fisher, Mutt and Jeff
- Ham Fisher, Joe Palooka
- Evelyn Flinders, The Silent Three
- Harold Rudolf Foster, Prince Valiant and Tarzan
- J.D. Frazer, User Friendly
- David Füleki, 78 Tage auf der Straße des Hasses
- Paul Gilligan, Pooch Cafe
- Erich von Götha de la Rosière
- Chester Gould, Dick Tracy
- Bud Grace, "Ernie/Piranha Club", "Babs and Aldo"
- Mel Graff, “The Adventures of Patsy”, “Secret Agent X-9”
- Bill Griffith, Zippy the Pinhead
- Milt Gross
- Cathy Guisewite, Cathy
- Nicholas Gurewitch, Perry Bible Fellowship
- Alex Hallatt
- Johnny Hart, B.C., The Wizard of Id
- Bill Hinds, Tank McNamara, Cleats, Buzz Beamer
- Bill Holman, Smokey Stover
- Daniel Hulet
- Billy Ireland
- Tatsuya Ishida, Sinfest
- Tove and Lars Jansson, The Moomins
- Ferd Johnson, Moon Mullins
- Kerry G. Johnson, Harambee Hills, caricaturist and children's book illustrator
- Russell Johnson, Mister Oswald
- Lynn Johnston, For Better or For Worse
- Eric Jolliffe, Andy
- Bil Keane, Family Circus
- Jeff Keane, Family Circus
- Walt Kelly, Pogo
- James Kemsley, Ginger Meggs
- Hank Ketcham, Dennis the Menace
- Kazu Kibuishi, Copper
- Frank King, Gasoline Alley
- Rick Kirkman, "Baby Blues"
- Keith Knight, The K Kronicles
- Charles Kuhn, Grandma
- Fred Lasswell, Barney Google
- Mell Lazarus, "Momma, Miss Peach"
- Virginio Livraghi
- Les Lumsdon, "Basil", "Nipper", "Caspar"
- Jeff MacNelly, Shoe
- Edgar Martin
- Clifford McBride, Napoleon
- Winsor McCay, Little Nemo
- Patrick McDonnell, Mutts
- Brian McFadden, Big Fat Whale
- Aaron McGruder, creator of the controversial strip The Boondocks
- George McManus, Bringing Up Father
- Caesar Meadows
- Dale Messick, Brenda Starr
- Tim Molloy
- Bill Murray, Sonny Boy
- Fred Negro, Pub Strip
- Chris Onstad, Achewood
- Jackie Ormes, "Torchy Brown in 'Dixie to Harlem'", "Torchy in 'Heartbeats'"
- Phil Ortiz
- Frode Øverli, Pondus
- Nina Paley, Nina's Adventures, Fluff, The Hots
- Brant Parker, The Wizard of Id
- Stephan Pastis, Pearls Before Swine
- Charles Peattie and Russell Taylor, Alex
- Mike Peters, Mother Goose & Grimm
- Keats Petree
- Stan Pitt, Larry Flynn, Detective
- Vic Pratt
- Dariush Ramezani
- John Rivas, Bonzzo
- Valentina Romeo, Jonathan Steele, Dylan Dog, Morgan Lost, Nathan Never
- Leigh Rubin, Rubes
- Warren Sattler, Grubby, Billy the Kid and Yang, as well as contributing artist for Barnaby daily, The Jackson Twins, Bringing Up Father and Hi and Lois
- Charles M. Schulz, Peanuts, Young Pillars
- Jerry Scott, "Baby Blues, Zits, Nancy"
- Caroll Spinney, Harvey
- Lee W. Stanley, The Old Home Town
- Cliff Sterrett, Polly and Her Pals
- Kris Straub, Starslip Crisis, Checkerboard Nightmare
- Henry Matthew Talintyre
- Harold Tamblyn-Watts
- Russell Taylor and Charles Peattie, Alex
- Richard Thompson, Cul de Sac
- Jim Toomey, Sherman's Lagoon
- Harry J. Tuthill, The Bungle Family
- Gustave Verbeek, The Upside Downs, The Terrors of the Tiny Tads
- Mort Walker, Beetle Bailey, Hi and Lois
- Bill Watterson, Calvin and Hobbes
- Bob Weber, Moose & Molly
- Monty Wedd, Ned Kelly
- Alex Williams, Queen's Counsel
- Tom Wilson, Ziggy

== Cartoonists of single-panel cartoons ==
- Charles Addams
- Gene Ahern
- Glen Baxter
- Belsky
- Jim Benton
- Rupert Besley
- Charles Boyce, Compu-Toon
- Barry Bradfield
- Sheree Bradford-Lea
- Bo Brown
- Bob Browne, British cartoonist living in Papua New Guinea
- Ivan Brunetti
- John Callahan
- Irwin Caplan
- Patrick Chappatte (Chappatte)
- Roz Chast
- Chumy Chúmez
- Mariza Dias Costa
- Wilbur Dawbarn
- Chon Day
- Donelan
- Denise Dorrance
- Nick Downes
- Mort Drucker
- Vladimir Flórez
- Stanley Arthur Franklin
- Carl Giles (Giles), Daily Express
- Ted Goff
- Bud Grace
- Sam Gross
- Dick Guindon
- William Haefeli
- Jessica Hagy
- Baron Halpenny
- Sidney Harris
- William Haselden
- Bill Hoest
- Judy Horacek
- Stan Hunt
- Hank Ketcham
- Ted Key
- John F. Knott, creator of Old Man Texas, Dallas Morning News, 1905-1957
- Clyde Lamb
- Gary Larson
- Mel Lazarus
- Robert Leighton
- George Lichty
- Mike Lynch
- Fred Neher
- John Norment
- Don Orehek
- Jackie Ormes, "Candy", "Patty-Jo 'n' Ginger"
- W. B. Park
- Virgil Partch
- Dave Pascal
- Mad Peck
- Matt Percival
- Martin Perscheid
- Josefina Tanganelli Plana
- Gardner Rea
- John Reiner
- Dan Reynolds
- Mischa Richter
- Victoria Roberts
- Burr Shafer
- Vahan Shirvanian
- Chris Slane
- Grant Snider
- Dan Steffan
- James Thurber
- Jerry Van Amerongen
- H. T. Webster
- Gluyas Williams
- J. R. Williams, Out Our Way
- Gahan Wilson
- George Wolfe
- Kevin Woodcock
- Bianca Xunise
- Bill Yates
- ZAK, pseudonym of Belgian cartoonist Jacques Moeraert

== Cartoonists of comic books ==
- Carlo Ambrosini
- Lewis Hancox
- Jack Herbert
- Sergio Aragonés, Mad; creator of Groo the Wanderer
- Daniel A. Baker
- Ken Battefield
- Jim Benton, Catwad,Batman Squad,Attack of the Stuff
- Bill Benulis, War is Hell
- Steve Bialik
- François Bourgeon, Le Cycle de Cyann
- Anna Brandoli
- Reg Bunn
- Ben Caldwell, creator of the Dare Detectives
- Aldo Capitanio
- Onofrio Catacchio
- Domitille Collardey
- Carlo Cossio, Dick Fulmine
- Jason Craig
- Hugleikur Dagsson
- Dame Darcy, creator of Meat Cake
- Patryck de Froidmont
- Gianni De Luca, Commissario Spada
- Dan DeCarlo, Archie, Josie and the Pussycats, Sabrina, the Teenage Witch
- Kim Deitch creator of Waldo the Cat and comic novels
- Vince Deporter, DC Comics; Nickelodeon, Spirou (Belgium)
- Julie Doucet, creator of Dirty Plotte, My New York Diary
- Will Elder, Mad, Little Annie Fanny in Playboy
- Steve Fiorilla, mini-comics
- Andy Fish
- Brad W. Foster, creator of Mechthings mini-comics, The Mechthings, Adventures of Olivia mini-comics
- Chandra Free
- Vernon Grant, creator of The Love Rangers
- Dick Hafer
- Marc Hansen, creator of Ralph Snart
- Los Bros Hernandez, creators of Love and Rockets
- Don Hillsman II
- Yvonne Hutton
- Al Jaffee, Mad, Snappy Answers to Stupid Questions
- Robyn E. Kenealy
- Helena Klakocar
- Andrea Kruis
- Harvey Kurtzman, founding editor of Mad
- Antonio Lara de Gavilán
- Selena Lin
- Craig McKay
- Mark Marderosian
- David Messer, adaptations of Macbeth and the Tempest
- Erika Moen
- Colonel Moutarde
- Art Nugent
- Gaman Palem
- Fung Chin Pang
- Power Paola
- Eduardo Vañó Pastor
- Craig Phillips
- Darren Sanchez
- Seth, creator of Palookaville
- Ravi Shankar
- Pran Kumar Sharma, Chacha Chaudhary
- Jeff Smith, Bone Book
- Cal Sobrepeña
- Fermín Solís
- Hans Steinbach
- Kazimir Strzepek
- Ramon Torrents
- Przemysław Truściński
- Jhonen Vasquez, Johnny the Homicidal Maniac, Squee!, I Feel Sick, Everything Can be Beaten, Fillerbunny, Bad Art Collection, Happy Noodle Boy
- Basil Wolverton, Mad
- Wally Wood, Mad
- Chao Yat
- Carlos Zéfiro
- Laura Zuccheri, Ken Parker, Julia-le avventure di una criminologa

=== Cartoonists of action/superhero comic books ===
- Kyle Baker, creator of Why I Hate Saturn
- Barry Bradfield, Batman: The Animated Homepage
- Jack Cole, creator of Plastic Man, later set the style for cartoons in Playboy
- Alan Davis, creator of ClanDestine
- Steve Ditko, creator of many Marvel Comics, including Spider-Man and Doctor Strange, with editor Stan Lee
- Will Eisner, creator of The Spirit, teacher, publisher, one of the first to popularize the term graphic novel, in his book A Contract with God
- Bilquis Evely
- Bob Kane, creator of The Batman with writer Bill Finger
- Jack Kirby, creator of Captain America with his partner Joe Simon, and many other comics
- Erik Larsen, creator of Savage Dragon
- Rob Liefeld, creator of Deadpool and Youngblood
- Jim McDermott
- Todd McFarlane, creator of Spawn
- Shawn McManus
- Mike Mignola, creator of Hellboy
- Frank Miller, creator of Sin City
- James O'Barr, creator of The Crow
- Paul Palnik, creator of The God of Cartoons
- Whilce Portacio
- Humberto Ramos
- Roberto Raviola, creator of La Compagnia della Forca
- Alberto Saichann
- Tim Sale
- Horacio Sandoval
- Marc Silvestri, creator of Cyberforce and The Darkness
- Dave Sim, creator of Cerebus
- Jeff Smith, creator of Bone
- Ed Tourriol
- Alain Voss

== See also ==
- Editorial cartoons
- Indian Institute of Cartoonists
- List of American comics creators
- List of animators
- List of caricaturists
- List of comic strips
- List of editorial cartoonists
- List of illustrators
- List of newspaper comic strips
