= George Houghton =

George Houghton may refer to:

- George Houghton (businessman) (21st century), English property businessman and football club chairman
- George Hendric Houghton (1820–1897), American clergyman
- George William Houghton (1905–1993), British golf writer and cartoonist
- George L. Houghton (1841–1917), American soldier in the American Civil War
- Shep Houghton (1914–2016), American actor and dancer
