= Ramezani =

Ramezani (Persian: رمضانی) adjective form of "Ramadan" (Arabic: رمضان) is a Persian surname which in its Latin transcription of the Perso-Arabic alphabet is also common among the Iranian diaspora. Notable people with the surname include:

- Alireza Ramezani (born 1984), Iranian footballer
- Alireza Ramezani (born 1993), Iranian football midfielder
- Arman Ramezani (born 1992), Iranian football forward
- Dariush Ramezani (born 1976), Iranian cartoonist
- Mojtaba Ramezani (born 1989), Iranian football midfielder
- Roya Ramezani, Iranian designer and women's rights campaigner
- Saeed Ramezani (born 1976), Iranian retired football player
