= American Scientist =

American science and technology magazine

- Cover of the 2007 September–October issue
- Editor In Chief: Fenella Saunders
- Categories: Science
- Frequency: 6/year
- Circulation: 99,500
- Publisher: Sigma Xi
- First issue: 1913
- Country: United States
- Based in: Research Triangle Park, North Carolina
- Language: English
- Website: americanscientist.org
- ISSN: 0003-0996

American Scientist (informally abbreviated AmSci) is an American bimonthly science and technology magazine published since 1913 by Sigma Xi, The Scientific Research Honor Society. In the beginning of 2000s the headquarters was moved to Research Triangle Park, (Durham), North Carolina. Each issue includes feature articles written by scientists and engineers who review research in fields from molecular biology to computer engineering.

Each issue also includes the work of cartoonists, including those of Sidney Harris, Benita Epstein, and Mark Heath. Also included is the Scientists' Nightstand that reviews a vast range of science-related books and novels.

American Scientist Online (ISSN 1545-2786) was launched in May 2003.
