= Lumsdon =

Lumsdon is a surname. Notable people with the surname include:

- Chris Lumsdon (born 1979), English footballer
- Cliff Lumsdon (1931–1991), Canadian world champion marathon swimmer
- John Lumsdon (born 1956), British footballer
- Les Lumsdon (1912–1977), Australian cartoonist
