= Buzz Aldrin, What Happened To You in All The Confusion? =

2005 novel by Johan Harstad

- Paperback edition, 2006
- Author: Johan Harstad
- Original title: Buzz Aldrin, hvor ble det av deg i alt mylderet?
- Translator: Deborah Dawkin
- Language: Norwegian
- Publisher: Gyldendal
- Publication date: January 1, 2005
- ISBN: 978-8-205-33959-0

Buzz Aldrin, What Happened To You in All The Confusion? (Original title: Buzz Aldrin, hvor ble det av deg i alt mylderet?) is a 2005 novel by the Norwegian author Johan Harstad. The book deals with a thirty-year-old gardener, Mattias, near obsessed with the thought of being second best, the greatest number two, much to his girlfriend's grievance. He looks upon astronaut Buzz Aldrin, the second man on the Moon, as his role model, and tries to live up to what he thinks Aldrin would do in any given situation. He has an extraordinary talent as a singer, but refuses to become a singer in his friend's semi-famous band, arguing that "not everyone wants to be a leader, some just want to be the secretary. Not everyone wants to star in a movie, some just want to watch the movie." After losing both his girlfriend and his job, he accidentally ends up on the Faroe Islands, where he meets people with the same ideals as himself, living in a psychiatric halfway house. Using the lunar-like landscape of the Faroe Islands as a backdrop, the novel deals with their attempt at finding a balance between being second best and anonymous without going into total isolation.

The novel has also been published in Sweden, Denmark, Finland, Netherlands, Germany, the Faroe Islands, Italy, Russia, Korea, Poland and France. It appeared in English in 2011 from Seven Stories Press in the United States and from UWA Publishing in Australia/New Zealand. Previously, New York magazine had included the book on a list of untranslated books most deserving of an English version. The American edition was long-listed for Three Percent magazine's Best Translated Book Award.

3:AM Magazine reviewer Colin Herd, in a review entitled "The great Faroese novel?", praised the book and noted that "Harstad’s novel about flying under the radar has categorically failed to do so, garnering wide praise, being made into a T.V. series". Kirkus Reviews gave the book a starred review, describing it as "A modern saga of rocketships, ice floes and dreams of the Caribbean, and great fun to read." Sydney Morning Herald critic David Messer gave a more mixed review, citing the author's wordy, detailed descriptive style as "both his greatest strength and weakness".

== Adaptation ==
A TV series adaptation of the book starring Pål Sverre Valheim Hagen as Mattias and Chad L. Coleman as Carl aired on Norwegian television in November and December 2011.
