= Naren Ray =

Indian cartoonist

- Born: Naren Ray; 1940; Comilla, Bengal Province, British India
- Died: 2003 (aged 62–63); Kolkata, West Bengal, India
- Occupation: cartoonist
- Years active: 1955–2003
- Employer: Freelancer

Naren Ray (1940 – 24 July 2003) better known as Sufi, was an Indian cartoonist with a career spanning nearly five decades, during which time he published political as well as children's cartoons in prominent Bengali magazines and newspapers. His role as a political cartoonist earned him more ire than dividends, while his work as a strip cartoonist was unique. His cartoons were followed by generations of Bengali middle-class people without ever knowing his true identity. He was a regular contributor to Shankar's Weekly, published by political cartoonist K. Shankar Pillai. Even though his works appeared exclusively in Bengali-language print media, his work had uniquely close ties to the leftist movement, rendering his drawings and ideas peerless.

== Early life and education ==
Sufi was born in the district of Comilla (now in Bangladesh) in 1940. His father worked in the police department and, after independence, relocated his family to Kolkata in 1948. Then a child, Sufi was taken out of school in Brahmanbaria, where he was in class four. He initially thought that they were going for a family trip and would soon return to what was then East Pakistan. Being unable to return to his childhood abode deeply distressed him. He later stated that he had never recovered from that jolt. The family shifted to Shibpur, Howrah, in the Indian state of West Bengal. Sufi attended Dinabandhu Institution in class five. Formal studies were never very appealing to him, and he taught himself, mainly by voracious reading. The eldest of five siblings, he had to start working in 1956, at the age of 16, without graduating. While he offered private tuition to sponsor his reading habits and was also a member of local libraries, he mostly borrowed books from acquaintances, finishing up to three a day. Sufi joined an art school in 1958 to pursue drawing and handicrafts. Personal and family problems led him to abandon the course before its completion in 1962, but he had decided to be a cartoonist.

== Career ==
Naren Ray started drawing for magazines early. During his school days, he and his mates from a library decided to publish a handwritten magazine, Koishorok. While he produced drawings and sketches for the periodical, fellow Shibpur resident and comic strip artist Narayan Debnath created the cover. He and Sufi would end up working with the same publishing house Deb Sahitya Kutir and Jugantar newspaper. These sketches followed the subject of a story or a poem. During this time, he followed the cartoon and comic columns in papers and periodicals including Jastimadhu, SachitraBharat, Achalpatra, and Shonibaarer Chithi and took notice of the sarcasm and irony employed by the cartoonists of the day, namely Shaila Chakraborty, Rebatibhusan, Promoth Samadder, etc. The popular sports magazines of the day, Gorer Maath and Stadium, were among the first places to publish his cartoons. By this time he had passed final exams and was drawing for Jastimadhu, Sangeetika, Jugantar, and Basumati. He also drew a few complete funny comics. His cartoons were first published in the magazine Swadhinata. One of his comic series was Raja (the detective kid) and Bagha (his dog) that was published in Kishore Bharati magazine.

The poverty, pain, and suffering around him encouraged him. At this point he started drawing political cartoons for Swadhinata. One of the proprietors of the paper, Arun Roy, became a mentor who encouraged him to proceed with political cartoons. Roy also introduced Sufi to the Indian version of Punch, Shankar's weekly. Sufi was a regular contributor to the magazine until it closed at the time of the 1975 emergency. Although initially he drew under his real name, for his political cartoons he adopted pen names including Bini, Birinchi, Srigupta, & Pramila Roy.

During the 1960s, a women's magazine named Mohila was run from north Kolkata by Basanta Kumar Chattopadhyay. Sufi was invited to draw for that magazine provided he used a female identity. Sufi signed his cartoons as Pramila Ray, his mother's real name. Similarly, he signed all his works as Sanjay in Basumati and Jugantar during this period. He had the first experience of publishing a complete comic strip in Swadhinata's Sunday edition. Saotal Bidroho, drawn by him and written by Pachugopal Bhaduri, was published as a serial in the paper. Sufi was to have a long association with both Jugantar and Basumati, which spanned more than 24 years until both papers expired in 1996.

=== Sufi ===
When he started drawing for the Communist party vehicle Ganashakti, he was advised by the editor to take the pen name of Sufi, associating him with asceticism and purity. He was harassed from time to time by his political opponents.

He was also drawing for children in different periodicals. These collective works have been hailed as his more enduring works. Sufi drew for magazines including Shuktara, Sishusathi, and Sandesh during the 1960s. He illustrated for Deb Shitya Kutir publications like Shuktara and Nabakallol. Sufi started drawing cartoons for Sandesh during 1962–63. Satyajit Ray admired his works. At least in one case, Ray provided a caption for one of Sufi's cartoons. That cartoon was reprinted in Sharadiya ganashakti magazine in 2000. In 1967–68 Dinesh Chandra Chattopadhyay started publishing Kishore Bharati. The magazine published serial strips from cartoonists including Sufi, Narayan Debnath, Shaila Chakraborty, Chandi Lahiri, and Mayukh Choudhury. Sufi taught arts and crafts from 1990 to 2001 at his residence, stopping only as his health deteriorated. He published cartoon tabloids named Rongo Byango and Byango Jagat during the later part of his life. In 1995, Sufi and his fellow political cartoonist Amal Roy published a brochure full of cartoons and insights, which was helped by The Lake Town Book Fair Committee. The brochure was titled Boi Niye Saatkahon, roughly translating as "Seven Tales of a Book". The publication was reprinted in 1996 and sold out.

== Political ideology ==
Sufi sympathised with the Communist Party. His younger brothers were also involved with the Naxalite and the leftist movements, respectively. Unlike his siblings, Sufi never took an active interest in party politics, but created political cartoons for Ganashakti as well as other tabloids. He was usually a freelancer, although he did draw on a regular basis for Basumati and Jugantar and publishing houses including Deb Sahitya Kutir. His political affiliations cost him because he refused to work for any publication that he could not ethically endorse. Often his cartoons were rejected by those magazines, as they ridiculed a personality that was a patron of the paper.

He worked as a clerk in a district school board in 1962, but he was fired when his sympathies were discovered. Similarly, his pen name, Sufi, was ridiculed by readers during the India Pakistan war of 1971, and people have assigned communist undertones to his name.

== Death ==
Sufi, along with his siblings and joint family, had moved to Bangur Avenue in 1972. He married Mamata Ray in March 1974. His only son, Nirmalya, was born in 1977. In 1990 he moved to his brother's house down the lane. He was plagued by asthma and was hospitalised repeatedly for breathing troubles. On the morning of Saturday, 26 July 2003, he suffered a massive heart attack and expired. True to his ideological beliefs, he had led an austere life. He dressed only in khaddarer panjabi and dhoti and worked and slept on the same mattress. His friends Shantipriyo Bandopadhyay and Amal Roy described him as a kind, humble, and philanthropic person, a true gentleman. The fact was reinforced by the information that he had donated his body and his eyes for research. He is survived by his wife and son.

== Legacy ==
He was never commercially successful in spite of his many publications. Similarly, he received very little recognition or media attention before his death, preferring a low profile. Posthumously he has been favourably reviewed by his surviving peers as well as the media and is widely considered a formidable figure of cartoon and caricature in Bengali. Sufi regretted the decreasing amount of exposure that cartoons have on Bengali media, and stated that there wasn't enough work in Bengali for a cartoonist to survive. On the other hand, he has been applauded for his positive influence in other publications in Delhi and Mumbai. He repeatedly stressed the serious message behind a cartoon and the ease with which it can be conveyed. He opined that not anyone could become a cartoonist and that those who do must have insight on many subjects. During his last days, he expressed the desire to make an animated film, although at the same time confessing that such an exercise was an impossible venture for him.
