= Kazimir Strzepek =

American cartoonist

Kazimir Strzepek is a cartoonist living in Seattle Washington. He is the creator of the 2006 Eisner nominated graphic novel The Mourning Star. The Mourning Star also won an Ignatz during the 2007 Small Press Expo. He grew up in Hawaii and went to the University of Hawaii for a degree in computer animation.
