= BONZZO (comic strip) =

American comic strip by John Rivas

- BONZZO comic characters. From left to right: Tridy, Ego Causa, BONZZO, Bogzzy and Tirillas "The Cat".
- Author(s): John Rivas
- Website: http://www.bonzzo.com
- Current status/schedule: Publishing on its website
- Launch date: 1998 in El Mundo and El Vocero newspapers
- Publisher(s): 1998 -2005 El Mundo 1998 - 2005 El Vocero; 2000 - 2002 El Reportero (Huntsville, Alabama); 2006 - 2010 Primera Hora 2011 - present bonzzo.com
- Genre(s): Humor, Children, Teens, Adults

BONZZO The Comic Strip is a comic strip created by John Rivas.

== History ==
=== About BONZZO ===
Rivas describes "BONZZO" as a young likable adult facing life with a child's mentality. His comic strip represents our daily lives, as well as reminds us of ideas, happy events and how we filtered each moment in our lives. “Bonzzo comes from a character I had to promote my advertising agency. The concept went from there, until I took it to the graphic stage of a comic strip. Fernando Roque helped me with the illustrations”, Rivas said. Since then, Bonzzo went from an inanimate object, to a comic strip published by the main island newspapers, since 1998. “When I created it, I did not name it. So I put all of the letters from the alphabet in a bag, and I took letters out until the name Bonzzo was complete”, he said.

BONZZO was first published in 1998 in two of the four leading newspapers in Puerto Rico, El Mundo and El Vocero (there are no syndicates in Puerto Rico). The coomic strips were published in both newspapers daily. Later, it was published on El Reportero newspaper in Huntsville, Alabama. It was also published, years later, on the Primera Hora newspaper in Puerto Rico.

During his tenure, Bonzzo has found different characters that little by little have been integrated into his life. For instance, Tridy, his extraterrestrial best friend; Tirillas, his spoiled cat who only wants to be fed; Ego Causa, Bonzzo's lawyer, mentor, and adviser; and as always, there is also the eternal love, Bogzzy, who is in love with Bonzzo and tries to capture his attention with her doey and seductive gaze. Nonetheless, she is happy with just being friends.

While U.S. syndication is one of Rivas's immediate goals, he also hopes to create a "BONZZO" theme park, "Bonzzolandia".

=== First USPS Pictorial Cancellation ===
Charles Scales, Art Stephenson, and John Rivas with NASA's BONZZO Award

On July 30, 1999, BONZZO had its First United States Postal Service (USPS) Pictorial Cancellation, in which the Plaza Las Americas Postal Store, located in San Juan, PR, became "BONZZO Station".

=== Big Comic Strips Expo ===
In 1999, BONZZO had a Big Comic Strips Expo at Plaza Las Americas Mall.

=== BONZZO and NASA ===
In 1999, Rivas exposed four of BONZZO's NASA themed comic strips at NASA's Kennedy Space Center, FL on its Hispanic Luncheon & Art Show, which was dedicated to him. Rivas designed some special "BONZZO" strips commemorating NASA's achievements, including "Beyond the Moon", a calendar of the year 2000 honoring Hispanic heritage.

==== NASA's BONZZO Award ====
NASA also instated the BONZZO Award, a pint-size BONZZO statue that will be given annually to the individual who makes the biggest contribution to NASA's Hispanic program. On October 12, 2000, Charles H. Scales, the director of Equal Opportunity at NASA's Marshall Space Flight Center, was the first recipient of this award: the statue was signed by Marshall Center Director Art Stephenson, Puerto Rican Gov. Pedro Rosselló and John Rivas, who donated the statue to honor the work of Hispanics at the Marshall Center. “Charles is an excellent choice for this first award,” said Elia Ordonez, Hispanic Employment Program manager at the Marshall Center. “He has contributed much to the quality of life in our community and, in particular, the Hispanic community at Marshall.”

NASA celebrated last year's "Hispanic Heritage Month" at the Kennedy Space Center with an exhibit of "BONZZO" comic strips. A life-sized BONZZO figure marched in the 2004 Puerto Rican Day Parade celebrated in New York City.

=== Website ===
In October 2011, BONZZO had its own website were you can see the beginnings and trajectory of this comic strip, informative capsules and daily comic strips. As H. J. Leonard said: "He has had lunch with governors, but he is not a government official. He has traveled through space, but he is not an astronaut. He has strolled with magazine owners, but he is not a businessman. Even famed boxer Tito Trinidad has fond memories of him, hanging in a wall at his studio. With his yellow shirt, blue pants and red snickers, this young man, who has made us laugh with his adventures in newspaper comic strips, will now move his comedic career to the Internet." Leonard also said: "The Internet then becomes a useful tool. “It is very sad that newspapers don’t give caricaturists a break”, Rivas said, lamenting the island's situation. “Originally, the comics appeared in newspapers, they were part of them. It was something that helped to sell newspapers and reach more people. This is how I began to check the Internet. I then became intrigued by projects in the web and the social networks”, he said. “Projects that help other people see these artistic works and give you an opportunity.” "

=== Second USPS Pictorial Cancellation and first USPS Commemorative Stamp ===
BONZZO's 2012 Pictorial Cancelation on Commemorative Envelope with Commemorative Postal Stamp

On May 10, 2012, BONZZO had its Second USPS Pictorial Cancellation, in which the General Archive of Puerto Rico, located in San Juan, PR, became "The Art of Bonzzo at the General Archive of Puerto Rico Station".

Dr. Hermán J. Cestero MD, from the Philatelic Society of Puerto Rico put the historic event in perspective by explaining the practice of commemorative stamps. “This is the second US Postal cancellation stamp for Bonzzo and the first time that a Bonzzo postage stamp has been officially made part of the US Postal Service.”"

== Main characters ==
BONZZO
A young adult, facing life with a teenager attitude. It is candid enough to have an alien as a friend without questioning the fact. He always has an idea of his own to solve the problems he faces. Always has a thing for BOGZZY, a girl who apparently refuses him. His clothes are decorated by "faces" (Full Faces), that serves as an editorial expression of his moods. BONZZO is the ambassador of our daily lives. Its apparent simplicity is what leads us to wrap ourselves in his world, that is ours ... and brings a smile to us, as he takes us away, for a moment, from the daily hustle we live in.

BOGZZY
An ambitious young woman, developing, living a healthy life. There is something about BONZZO that attracts her, but she did not let him know clearly, she flirts with him. Her clothing also features the "Full Faces" that BONZZO has. She represents a controversy in the world of BONZZO, because she has a different view of the world, that is exemplified in her elliptical glasses. She is the only character whose eyes are not round, they are slanted.

TRIDY
An eccentric alien, friend of BONZZO, that comes from the planet TRIDYLANDIA. People do not see him as a strange being and accept him as a person, however, the same people sees BONZZO as "someone strange" out of this world. TRIDY has special powers that he uses to help BONZZO when he is in trouble. The earthling vocabulary creates humorous confusions in TRIDY.

TIRILLAS "The Cat"
A cat BONZZO picked one day in the street. He is ungrateful, grumpy, naughty as he can only be. He brings an endless number of problems to BONZZO. His only interest is that BONZZO gives him food.

EGO CAUSA
BONZZO's friend and attorney. He is always in dispute with the daily living. His motto is: "that is the Perversity of Matter", which for him means the true liberation of his spirit and problems. He uses this phrase at all times to describe his situations in daily life, which intentionally cause harm around him and corrupt his customs, with a great negative effect on himself. You can see the effect of the perversity of matter in the advice that he gives BONZZO at all times, full of wisdom, and many others lacking sensitivity. For EGO in his legal profession, everybody has a cause for being guilty, in that way he always has a reason to charge and legally defend them. He is always victorious on legal situations with a verdict in favor of his clients, of innocence. He is very good at his profession, although his personality proves otherwise, as it reflects a level of mediocrity and irresponsibility with his informal way of dressing, with shorts, shirt and tennis shoes; also, his car is full of bumps. He is a mess at first glance, as a first impression for those who do not know him, but for BONZZO, is more than an unconditional friend, is like a father.

FULL FACES
The FACES. This is a power that BONZZO and BOGZZY acquired from TRIDY. These strange characters have round eyes and autonomous expressions, which reflect the mood, the attitudes, etc., like the chorus of Greek tragedy. We must be alert to their expressions because they are intrinsic to BONZZO's world.

== Later years ==
BONZZO's "Discovery of Puerto Rico" comic strip

John Rivas, Rafael Ithier (from El Gran Combo de PR), and Miguel Muñoz (President of the University of Puerto Rico) at "The Art of BONZZO Visits the General Archive of Puerto Rico - Big Comic Strips Expo".

Luz Nereida Vélez, from Noticentro 4, interviews John Rivas at "The Art of BONZZO Visits the General Archive of Puerto Rico - Big Comic Strips Expo".

=== The Art of BONZZO Visits the General Archive of Puerto Rico - Big Comic Strips Expo ===
On May 10, 2012, the General Archive of Puerto Rico opened is doors to the exposition: "The Art of BONZZO Visits the General Archive of Puerto Rico - Big Comic Strips Expo". Over 25 of BONZZO's comic strips and BONZZO's memorabilia will be exposed there until October 31, 2012. It is BONZZO's second big comic strips expo."More than 20 Big Comic Strips from the BONZZO character will remain framed in another page of the history of the Comic Strips genre in Puerto Rico and abroad."

=== Zero Violence Cartoon Exposition ===
On 2012 John Rivas also participated, with various of his BONZZO works, on a zero violence cartoon exposition held at the General Archive of Puerto Rico.

== TV appearances and events videos (John Rivas, BONZZO related) ==
=== TV appearances (John Rivas, BONZZO related) ===
- Protagonistas - Interview by Gabriel Suau
- Notiseis - Interview by Yajaira Rodero
- Notiseis - Interview by Yajaira Rodero
- Notiseis - Interview by Keyshla Rolón
- Noticentro 4 - Interview by Rosa Delia Meléndez
- Las Noticias Teleonce - Interview by Liza Lugo
- Las Noticias Teleonce - Interview
- A Fuego - Interview by Sonya Cortés
- Vale Más - Interview by Héctor Marcano
- El Planeta de REMI - Interview by REMI (#1)
- El Planeta de REMI - Interview by REMI (#2)
- El Planeta de REMI - Interview by REMI (#3)
- El Planeta de REMI - Interview by REMI (#4)
- Noticentro 4 - Interview by Luz Nereida Vélez
- Noticentro 4 - News Article by Rafael Lenín López

=== Events videos (John Rivas, BONZZO related) ===
- Interview Hon. Pedro Rosselló (Governor of Puerto Rico) with John Rivas on La Fortaleza, San Juan, Puerto Rico
- NASA's Hispanic Luncheon & Art Show 1999, Kennedy Space Center, FL, which was dedicated to John Rivas and BONZZO's comic strips were exposed on the Art Show.
- The Art of BONZZO Visits Puerto Rico General Archive, San Juan, Puerto Rico - Previous to the Opening Day Activity
- The Art of BONZZO Visits Puerto Rico General Archive, San Juan, Puerto Rico - Opening Day Activity

=== Art critics and expositions commentaries videos (John Rivas & BONZZO) ===
- Dr. Osiris Delgado (Painter) recognizes John Rivas and BONZZO's work.
- BONZZO is already an historical figure - By: Antonio J. Molina
- Honorable Judge José A. Andreu García comments about the Art of BONZZO & the Very BONZZO Persons, created by John Rivas.

== See also ==
- List of Puerto Ricans - Cartoonists
- List of Puerto Ricans in the United States Space Program
