= Muscular Development =

American bodybuilding magazine

- Max Rep & Quadra Blu, November 1993
- Editor: David Zinczenko
- Categories: Bodybuilding
- Frequency: 12 times a year
- Founded: 1964
- Country: United States
- Based in: Setauket, New York
- Language: English
- Website: www.musculardevelopment.com

Muscular Development was an American fitness and bodybuilding magazine first published in 1964. It was founded by Bob Hoffman. It ceased publication in November 2023.

== History ==
John Grimek was the editor from 1964, until its sale in 1986 to Twinlab. In 2001, Twinlab sold Muscular Development to Steve Blechman who then resigned from Twinlab. Muscular Development was also published in Romania.

Muscular Development focused on bodybuilding and nutrition science. Among its contributors were Anssi H. Manninen (former Senior Science Editor), Michael Colgan, John Romano (former Senior Editor), Dan Duchaine, and Mike Mentzer. It was notable for including an ongoing comic strip, Max Rep: Mr. Astrotitan 2206 by illustrator Lyman Dally in the 1990s. Max Rep was featured on the January 1991 cover with Sandy Riddell while both he and Quadra Blu appeared together on the fully illustrated November 1993 cover with Quadra appearing on that issue's poster. After the sale of the magazine to Blechman it changed to a more "hard-core" bodybuilding magazine and focused less on fitness.

== See also ==
- List of female bodybuilders
- List of male professional bodybuilders
