= Ravi Shankar (cartoonist) =

Indian author and cartoonist

Ravi Shankar Etteth, professionally known by his full name, or as Ravi Shankar is an Indian author and cartoonist.

== Early life and career ==
He was born in Palakkad, Kerala and is a nephew of the cartoonist and author O. V. Vijayan.

His first cartoon appeared in Link. He worked for Indian Express on a contract basis, and as the staff cartoonist. In 1990, he became the Creative Director of the Observer Group of Publications. He later became the deputy editor of India Today. He was also art director of the magazine. He edited the afternoon tabloid Today and is the founder editor of India Today Spice. He has worked In television as the Editor in Chief and CEO of Voice of India. He was also the Editorial Director of Media Transasia.

In 1996, Etteth published his first book of short stories The Scream of the Dragonflies. By 2002, Etteth claimed he had retired from political cartooning for all practical purposes, and chose to describe himself as a writer and art director. He is the author of four novels The Tiger by the Rivet, The Village of the Widows, The Gold of Their Regrets and The Book of Shiva. He has also written two books on Kerala; one with the artist Paresh Maity.

He is a columnist and editor with The New Indian Express, based in New Delhi.

== Bibliography ==
=== As Illustrator ===
- Beastly tales: from here to there by Vikram Seth; illustrated by Ravi Shankar (Phoenix, 1999)

=== As author ===
- The Scream of the Dragonflies, by Ravi Shankar Etteth (Penguin Books, 1996)
- The Village of Widows, by Ravi Shankar Etteth (Penguin Books)
- The Tiger by the River, by Ravi Shankar Etteth (Penguin Books)
- The Gold of their Regrets, by Ravi Shankar Etteth (Penguin Books)
- Return of the Brahmin, by Ravi Shankar Etteth (Westland Publication)
