= Mahmoud Shokraye =

Iranian cartoonist

Mahmoud Shokraye is an Iranian cartoonist. He is most famous in English-speaking world for being sentenced to 25 lashes for a caricature he drew for a newspaper of a local member of parliament for the city of Arak.

Shokraye drew a cartoon of local politician Ahmad Lotfi Ashtiani for Nameye Amir, a city newspaper in Arak. The cartoon depicts Ashtiani in a football stadium, dressed as a footballer, with a congratulatory letter in one hand and his foot resting on the ball. Ashtiani sued Shokraye for insulted him. The Markazi provincial court then found in favor of Ashtiani and sentenced the cartoonist to 25 lashes. The punishment was unprecedented for an Iranian cartoonist and prompted a backlash in Iran's online community and social media with calls for cartoonists to draw new caricatures of the MP. Nikahang Kowsar, a prominent Iranian cartoonist who was also punished for caricaturing a prominent official told the Guardian newspaper: "This verdict is a direct threat to each and every cartoonist working inside Iran. From now on, if this sentence is not set aside, any public official could sue the cartoonists for portraying him/her in a cartoon.". Iranian journalist Masih Alinejad thought the sentence notable as a sign of Iranian authorities' lack of tolerance towards any form of criticism, and noted the very mild nature of the caricature. "He has drawn the MP exactly the way he is, even with his prayer mark. Actually the MP's cartoon looks better than the MP himself." Amnesty International also protested the lashings.
