= South Coast Times and Wollongong Argus =

1900–1959 Australian newspaper

The South Coast Times and Wollongong Argus, also previously published as the Wollongong Argus, and later as the South Coast Times, was a weekly English language newspaper published in Wollongong, New South Wales, Australia from 1900 to 1959.

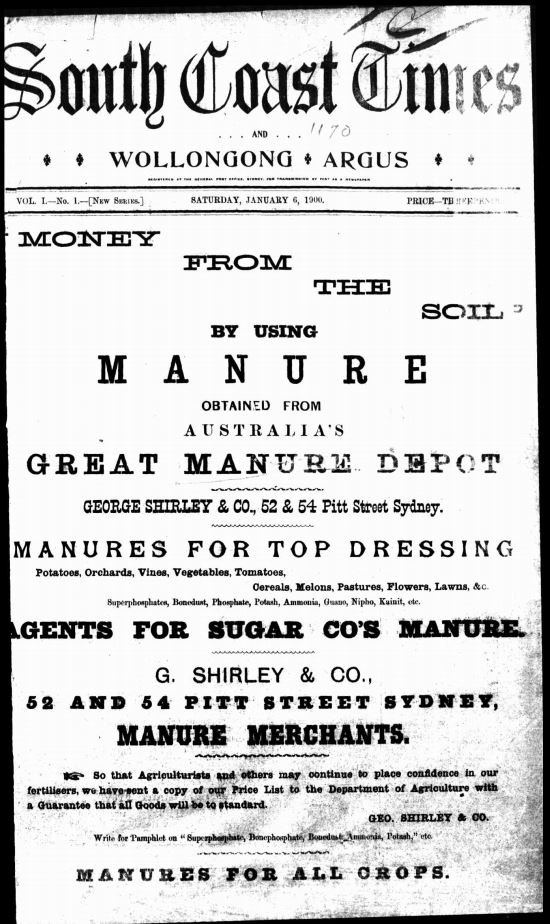
Front page of the South Coast Times and Wollongong Argus published on 6 January 1900

== History ==
Volume 1, no. 1 of the South Coast Times and Wollongong Argus appeared on Saturday 6 January 1900, incorporating its precursor, the Wollongong Argus, which commenced publication in 1876 and continued until 1899. The paper's first editorial noted that "our venture should be regarded merely in the light of a soundly conducted useful paper – a vehicle by means of which ideas can be interchanged, abuses remedied, and the world's news and general information gathered and disseminated ..."

During the 1940s the newspaper was owned by Mona E. Dee, who subsequently entered into partnership with Stanley Leonard (Stan) Lord. From 1949 the newspaper was published twice weekly, coming out on Monday evenings and Thursday mornings. The publication area extended from Nowra north to Helensburgh.

The last issue of the paper, volume 59 no. 43, appeared on 1 June 1959. It was continued by the South Coast Times, which was published between 4 June 1959 and 28 December 1968.

== Digitisation ==
The paper has been digitised as part of the Australian Newspapers Digitisation Program project of the National Library of Australia.

== See also ==
- List of newspapers in Australia
- List of newspapers in New South Wales
