= Bantul the Great =

Indian Bengali comic strip character

Bantul the great
- First appearance: Shuktara (1965)
- Created by: Narayan Debnath
- Publisher: Deb Sahityo kutir

In-universe information
- Aliases: Batul; Bantul; Batul the great
- Species: Human
- Gender: Male
- Occupation: Superhero
- Nationality: Indian; Bengali

Batul, Bantul, Batul the Great, or Bantul the Great (Bengali: বাঁটুল দি গ্রেট) is a popular Bengali comic strip character created by Narayan Debnathin 1965. Bantul the great is originally India's first untelevised superhero. It first appeared and still appears in a children's magazine called Shuktara and is widely read, not only by children but by adults as well. It has since appeared in a comic book format and as an animation series.

== Origin ==
Narayan Debnath's first comic book characters in color were for the comic strip and book Batul The Great. By Debnath's admission, he thought up the idea of the superhero while returning from College Street, Calcutta. He has remarked that the character of Batul or Bantul was influenced by his friend Manohar Aich, the famous Bengali bodybuilder. The name came to him instantly and he thought up the figure of the protagonist rapidly. Initially, he did not know what he foresaw as a future for Batul or Bantul and did not give him any superpowers.

When the Bangladesh War of Liberation, also known as the Indo-Pakistani War of 1971 flared up, he was asked by the editors and publishers to add an aura of invincibility. Debnath was reluctant at first because he was worried about legal implications. On assurance, he made Batul a superhero. Bullets began to bounce off of him, much like Superman. Batul was still drawn by Debnath for Shuktara. It has been argued that the historical and cultural significance of Bantul is that he "became a symbol of formidability, a much needed push for the Bengalis in the Bangladesh Liberation War, 1971."

== Theme ==
The protagonist of the comics, Batul or Bantul, is a superhuman, with a well-built body, and he is so strong that he can lift a building, run through a wall breaking it to pieces, kill whales and sharks barehanded, and even missiles cannot pierce his body. Though his height was never specified in the comics, he was portrayed having a large, broad chest, an overall massive upper body but rather thin legs, giving him a legit tall appearance. The animated series from 2010 showed him weighing 500kgs and around 6'2', especially in the later episodes. He has a great appetite and even have eaten whole roasted sharks as seen in comics. Batul is always seen clad in a pink or orange vest and black shorts. He is the terror of dacoits and hooligans, and protects the good. Sometimes, Bantul's amazing strength is the cause of his downfall. This is especially true when he is trying to operate machinery, since he usually breaks it. Another example, depicted in the panel, shows him trying to ride a bull in a rodeo, but due to his weight, the legs of the bull get embedded in the ground. During the early years as a comic book character, Bantul was very powerful but was not a superhuman. But his body was indeed hard enough for him to be able to tank bullets, missile attacks and explosions. With Bantul stays two mischievous boys viz. Goja (গজা) and Bhoja (ভজা), who regularly play truant at school, often conspire with robbers and even commit daring crimes like bank robberies. Other characters in the comic strip include Lambakarna (লম্বকর্ণ), who has long ears and superhuman hearing, Batul's pet dog "Vedo" (ভেদো) and his pet ostrich "Uto" (উটো). In earlier comics and in some of later comics, Batul's paternal aunt has been depicted.

In the 2010 animated series, the strength of Batul or Bantul increased, with him now being able to even expand or contract the size of his body, having infinite physical strength and even being able to lift the entire sun or any unmovable entity. He is now a superhero possessing supreme intellect along with having an unmatched mental and physical strength. He is also known to be immune to the effects of the most powerful weapons, dark magic or any kinds of physical/mental manipulation. Bantul has performed several planetary and multiversal feats in the animation series. In the animated series, he is widely shown to be the savior of the good and the destroyer of hooligans, dacoits, monsters, evil scientists, cosmic beings and aliens. Bantul's updated powers in the animation series makes him one of the most powerful superheroes of modern times similar to the strongest incarnations of DC's Superman and Marvel's Thor or even more powerful. The two mischievous boys staying with Batul, Goja and Bhoja are referred to as Bachhu (Bengali: বাচ্চু) and Bichchu (Bengali: বিচ্ছু). Other characters seen in the animated series but not in the comics are -Nitai da, who is a servant of Batobyal Sir. Batobyal Sir (a game teacher) is another character who is also a very close neighbor of Bantul.

== Powers and abilities ==
Batul has the following powers and abilities as shown in the comics:

1. He has the power of indestructibility.
2. He cannot be captured or harmed without his own will.
3. His body is impenetrable.
4. He is immune to the effects of any godly, natural or man-made weapons.
5. He has superhuman speed.
6. He has superhuman stamina.
7. He has superhuman durability.
8. He has superhuman breath allowing him to exhale huge volumes of air and extinguish fire or destroy any obstruction in his path.

Batul has the following powers and abilities as shown in the animated series:

1. He has superhuman intellect.
2. He is a supreme hand-to-hand combatant.
3. He is an expert detective.
4. He has superhuman reflexes.
5. He has shapeshifting ability.
6. He has superhuman strength allowing him to even lift or destroy the planets, sun, moon and other galaxies.
7. He is immune to magic or dark magic.
8. He is immune to reality warping.
9. He can easily survive universal or planetary destruction.
10. He is immune to any form of manipulation.
11. He is omnipotent.
12. He is the possessor of divine power.

== Bantul the Great (God Mode) – powers and abilities ==
In the animated series, Bantul is often seen tapped into his God-mode form where he becomes a supreme divine being who works for universal good and cannot be defeated or controlled by even the higher level Gods/beings from other universes or his own. He possesses the following powers and abilities at that mode:

1. He becomes highly omnipotent where nothing divine, cosmic, man-made, or magical can affect him.
2. He becomes immune to all forms of reality warping.
3. He gets powers that can bend reality, himself becomes immune to reality warping and can even affect the entire universe with his powers.
4. He cannot be erased from existence by any being be that a God or the creator himself.
5. He has infinite knowledge and has the highest level intellect comparable to the most powerful beings from every comic and mythology.
6. He is aware of everything that happens around him or anywhere else including the heavens, hell and other divine places.
7. He is capable of stopping time and can take down the most powerful Gods, cosmic beings, demons, universes easily.
8. In divine God mode, he is the all-knowing, all-powerful being who exists beyond time and space.

== Animated series ==
Bantul the great got his own television series in 2010. The series has 1 season and has 550 episodes. Most of the episodes are available on YouTube.

== See also ==
- Handa Bhonda
- Nonte Phonte
