= Bob Penuelas =

American cartoonist, born 1957

- Born: 1957 (age 67–68); San Diego, California
- Occupation: Cartoonist
- Known for: Wilbur Kookmeyer

Bob Penuelas (born 1957) is an American comic strip illustrator and writer. He created the comic-strip character Wilbur Kookmeyer, which appeared in Surfer Magazine from 1986 to 2006.

Penuelas was born and raised in the Pacific Beach neighborhood of San Diego, California. He learned to draw from his father, a technical illustrator. He was heavily influenced by MAD Magazine. In his early teens Penuelas learned to surf and soon was creating surfing-related art..At that time he was influenced by Rick Griffin, whose artwork regularly appeared in Surfer Magazine.

Penuelas began his career as a comic-strip artist with the creation of the Maynard and the Rat strip for Surfer Magazine in 1980. Between 1980 and 1985 he produced 25 two-page episodes for Surfer.

In 1985, Penuelas introduced Wilbur Kookmeyer into the strip. Wilbur drew a large positive response from readers. In 1986, Penuelas replaced Maynard and the Rat with the Wilbur Kookmeyer strip.

In 2006, after 74 episodes Penuelas retired the strip. Since then, he has released a series of posters reproduced from the strips.
