= Les Lumsdon =

Australian cartoonist

Leslie Lumsdon (16 October 1912 – 1977) was a popular Australian cartoonist for the Newcastle Morning Herald.

== Personal life ==
He was born on 16 October 1912 in Abermain, New South Wales. He married his wife Vera on 1 July 1938.

== Career ==
His first job was working at his parents' corner store. Then he got a job at the advertising department at the Hustler's store in Maitland. During World War II he worked in the Newcastle camouflage unit. He spent two years in New Guinea where he made extra money drawing postcards which were popular with American troops.

In 1942 his first cartoon strips on Basil appeared in the South Coast Times and Wollongong Argus, the Muswellbrook Chronicle and the Gippsland Times. From July 1944 a mouthless boy named Nipper began to appear in cartoons published by the Burnie Advocate.

In 1946 he was hired by the Newcastle Herald as a cartoonist. He was a popular artist who once emptied seventeen pens signing autographs at a Newcastle Show.

He retired from the Newcastle Morning Herald in 1977 and died later that year.

== Casper the Cat ==
His most famous drawing was Casper the black cat. There was public outcry when he drew Casper being drowned in the Newcastle Harbour after failing to pick a Melbourne cup winner. He published five volumes of cartoons that included Casper.

== Exhibitions ==
- Artists and cartoonists in black and white in 1999 in the S. H. Ervin Gallery, National Trust of Australia (NSW), Sydney, NSW
- 50 years of the newspaper cartoon in Australia in 1973 at the Art Gallery of South Australia, Adelaide, SA
- Fifty Years of Australian Cartooning, 11 September 1964 - 19 September 1964, Blaxland Gallery, Sydney, New South Wales
- Lake Macquarie City Library, Speers Point, New South Wales
- National Trust of Australia (NSW), Sydney, NSW
