= Neil Lonsdale =

New Zealand commercial artist and cartoonist

Neil Lonsdale (Christchurch, New Zealand 1907 - Henderson, New Zealand 1989) was a New Zealand commercial artist and cartoonist. He was the editorial cartoonist for the Auckland Star (1952-1968) and illustrated 'Over the teacups' for the New Zealand Woman's Weekly. He also drew 'panel gags' for New Zealand Pictorial in the mid-1950s. He retired in about 1975.
