= Six Chix =

Collaborative comic strip

Six Chix is a collaborative comic strip distributed by King Features Syndicate which debuted in January 2000. The gags provide satire from a female point-of-view.

The series is drawn by six female cartoonists who rotate the drawing duties through the week based on a fixed schedule:

- Monday – Isabella Bannerman
- Tuesday – Bianca Xunise; Martha Gradisher (through January 2020); Margaret Shulock (through March 2017)
- Wednesday – Susan Camilleri Konar; Rina Piccolo (through October 2016)
- Thursday – Mary Lawton; Anne Gibbons (through August 2017); Carla Ventresca (October 2005 through July 2007); Ann Telnaes (through September 2005)
- Friday – Maritsa Patrinos; Benita Epstein (through March 2019); Kathryn LeMieux (through April 2009)
- Saturday – Stephanie Piro
- Sunday – Rotates

The Sunday comic is drawn by the team members on a rotating basis. The look and feel of the strip varies greatly among the six artists with no particular attempt made to introduce any sort of thematic cohesiveness.

Six Chix has been syndicated to more than 120 newspapers, including the Arizona Republic, Detroit News, San Diego Union-Tribune, San Francisco Chronicle, and Seattle Post-Intelligencer.

Five months after the strip was launched, the original six women met each other for the first time on May 27, 2000. The occasion was a National Cartoonists Society Reubens Dinner in New York. On June 2, 2000, they appeared together on the Lifetime for Women Television Network. The original team lasted for about five and a half years, through September 2005; since then, there has been additional turnover, though original members Isabella Bannerman (Mondays) and Stephanie Piro (Saturdays) remain.
