= John Rivas =

Puerto Rican graphic artist

- Rivas in 2012
- Born: Aibonito, Puerto Rico
- Occupations: Artist, writer, publicist, professor
- Writing career
- Notable work: BONZZO The Comic Strip
- Website: johnrivaspublicidad.com

John Rivas is a Puerto-Rican graphic designer and publicist and the creator of the comic strip BONZZO The Comic Strip.
