= Nonte Phonte =

Bengali Comic Characters

- Comic strip sketch of Nonte and Phonte

নন্টে আর ফন্টে
- Author: Narayan Debnath
- Illustrator: Narayan Debnath
- Magazine: Kishore Bharati

Batul the Great, Handa Bhonda, Bahadur Beral

Nonte Phonte also spelled as Nonte Fonte, is a Bengali comic-strip (and later comic book) creation in 1969 by Narayan Debnath, which originally was serialized for the children's monthly magazine Kishore Bharati (Bengali: কিশোর ভারতী). The stories featuring in the comic strips focus on the trivial lives of the title characters, Nonte and Phonte, along with a school-senior, Keltuda, and their boarding school Superintendent. The comics have appeared in book form and have been recreated since 2002 in colour. A popular animation series based on the characters has also been filmed.

== Characters ==
All the characters belong to a semi-rural (mofasshal) town of Paschimpara in West Bengal, India. The younger characters live in a hostel of a boarding school. The teachers of the school are rarely seen but the headmaster is sometimes depicted. The superintendent and the staff of the hostel are often picturized. All of the characters have whimsical nicknames that add to the amusement of the readers.

=== Nonte ===
Nonte is 16-year-old boy, wears orange, and is immediately distinguishable from Fonte due to his longer hair and a tuft of hair sticking out from the back of his head.

=== Fonte ===
Fonte is a 15-year-old boy, wearing a blue shirt, and is immediately distinguishable from Nonte due to his shorter hair.

=== Keltu ===
Keltu is a 19-year-old tall and mischievous boy who always tells lies in Nonte and Fonte's class. He's the only student who wears trousers instead of shorts probably on account of his advanced years. In one comic strip, the reader learns that he has failed the class six times and the governing body of the school wants to get rid of him. He is shown variously as having curly hair and a stubby nose and being a bit taller and stronger than Nonte and Fonte. Often he threatens and coaxes them into doing work for him but invariably gets busted. He also rats on the other students to curry favor with the superintendent and is, in general, quite boastful.

In the earlier stories, he was shown to be a cruel bully who always framed Nonte and Fonte for something they did not commit. In the end, Nonte and Fonte took revenge by busting Keltu. However, in the later stories, despite his ongoing rivalry with Nonte and Phonte, he is shown to be much more friendly towards the duo.

He is the only student who is said to be in the list of good students of Superintendent and is often insulted by the Superintendent. To bullying Nonte and Fonte in front of sir, he often says that Nonte and Fonte do not want sir's good health. He often conspires against them and at last he himself gets caught in sir's hands.

Although, there are some stories where they all work together, which is very rare and can be found in only two or three stories.

=== Superintendent ===
The 50-year-old Superintendent is an obese, balding man who loves to eat and discipline his students. He is shown as not being particularly courageous, lazy, and greedy. He definitely enjoys corporal punishment and canes the students often. Usually he is the butt of most pranks. He is always heckled by the students. In the comic books, his name is mentioned as Patiram Hati. But, in the animated cartoon series, his name is mentioned as Hatiram Pati. In a single story, his name is mentioned as Ghatotkach Ghatak, and in another story, Patiram Hati was a criminal's name instead of Superintendent.

=== Thakur ===
Thakur is a 42-year-old man, who is servant of his owner Hatiram Pati. He likes to dance in his house with radio. He speaks Hindi, Marathi, Gujarati and Punjabi. He calls Nantua to Nonte, Fantua to Fonte, Kaltu babu to Keltu and Suparintin Babu or Suparintin sahab to his owner.

=== Recurring characters ===
Minor recurring characters include the headmaster who is quite benign, the cooks at the boarding school hostel who speak Bengali with accents that vary from Bihari, Oriya, and Dhakai, and many students like Panga, Nepchada, Lengcha, Boncha.

== Recurring themes ==
- All the major characters in Nonte Phonte are fond of eating. Often the compulsion behind an action is to eat a good meal or to stash away some goodies, something many who have lived in hostels in India (or elsewhere) may be able to relate to.
- In many of the earlier strips and comic books, Nonte and Phonte do not always get along. Their tension is akin to that of Handa and Bhonda in the Handa Bhonda strips. They may fight but often some good comes to a bystander under amusing circumstances.
- The superintendent is a loathsome, corrupt, and lazy individual who believes in beating the students. However, he is usually tricked by Keltuda and then ultimately deceived by Nonte and Phonte in the end of many story panels and decides to thrash Keltuda.
- Keltuda is usually quite greedy and malicious towards Nonte and Phonte. Many times, he succeeds in getting the duo into trouble but they always get back at him sometime. He comes off as being extremely clever, but in each story this cleverness is invariably revealed as being foolhardiness.
- Nonte and Phonte often perform social services to the community and in many cases end up uncovering crooks who are often under disguises and have beguiled Keltuda and/or the hostel superintendent.
- In some cases, they are friends with Keltuda and the three of them do good things, or get in trouble.
- Some of the comics are recycled into Handa Bhonda comics featuring Bhonda's friend Bocha, with Keltu, Nonte & Phonte being replaced with Handa, Bocha & Bhonda respectively.

== Adaptations ==
=== Television ===
The stories of Nonte Fonter Nanan Kirtee were adapted in an original television series. The episodes of which initially aired on Tara TV and then in CTVN. Out of a hoard of fresh faces, Kanchan Mullick's portrayal of Keltuda was admired and lauded. The series however discontinued due to poor production values and low TRPs & children like Tom and Jerry on that time.

Later the stories were adapted in an animated television series named Nonte Fonter Nanan Kirtee by SSOFTOONS. The episodes were aired on Akash Bangla since 2006 and it became a success, both critically and commercially.

== Voice Artists ==
- Sudipto Mukherjee as Fonte
- Saurav Mandol as Nonte
- Avik Das as Keltu
- Manojit Bose as Superintendent Sir
- Ankita Mandol Other Character's

== See also ==
- Handa Bhonda
- Bantul the Great
