= Bianca Xunise =

American artist

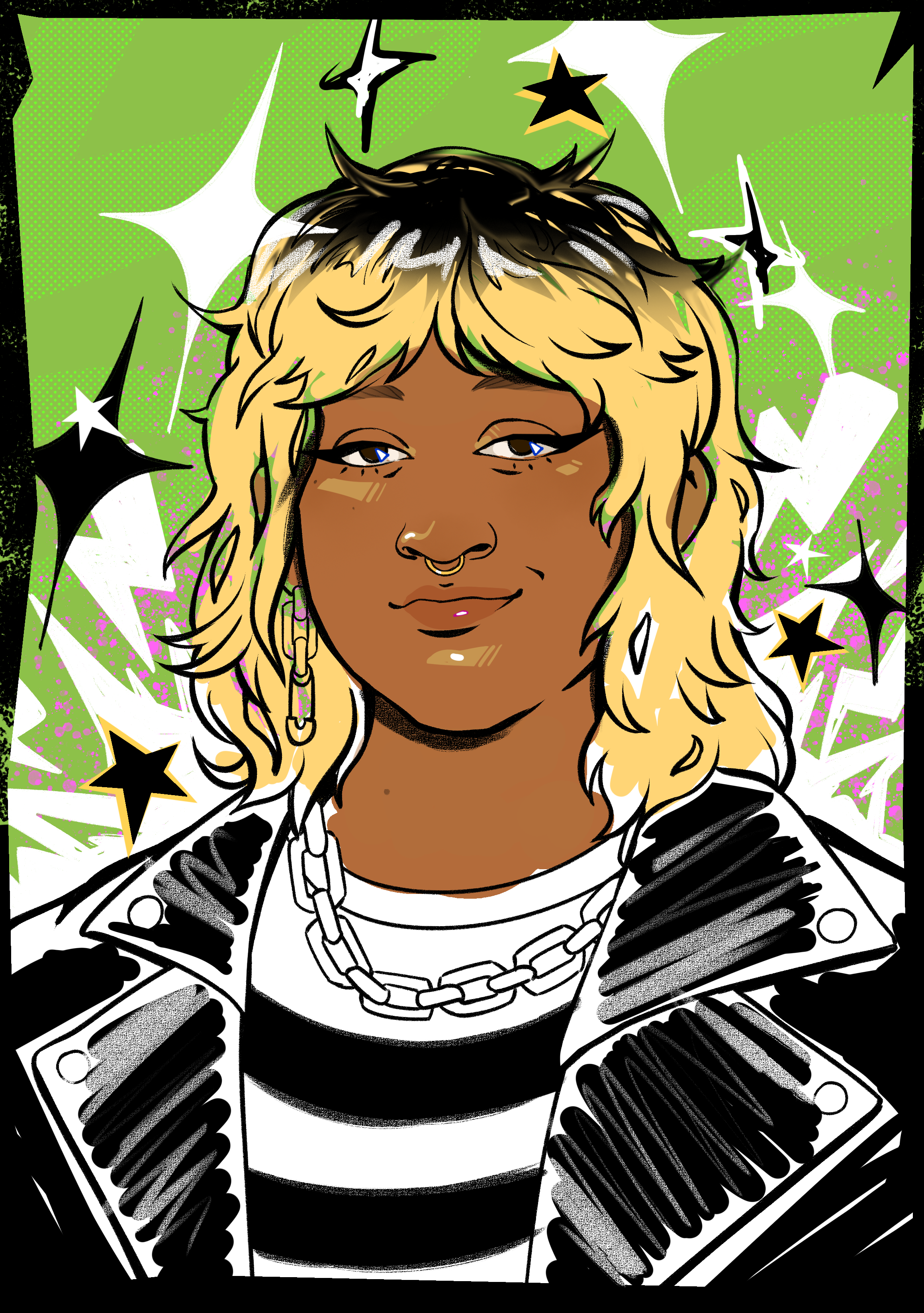
- portrait of Bianca Xunise, by Thayná Stvanin
- Born: Chicago, Illinois, United States
- Education: University of Illinois at Chicago (BFA)
- Occupations: Cartoonist, illustrator
- Notable work: Six Chix
- Awards: Ignatz Award (2017)
- Website: biancaxunise.com

Bianca Xunise is an American cartoonist and illustrator. Their (Note: Xunise uses both they/them and she/her pronouns. This article uses they/them for consistency.) work is nationally syndicated through the Six Chix comic strip collaborative.

== Early life ==
Xunise was born in Chicago to artistic parents; their mother was a fashion designer. Their family has Creole roots.

They have a Bachelor of Fine Arts from the University of Illinois Chicago.

They started as a fashion blogger, but quit "because they didn't want to indict George Zimmerman in the Trayvon Martin case and after that I realized I [didn't] care what I'm wearing anymore."

== Career ==
Xunise's influences include Tove Jansson, Ludwig Bemelmans, and Naoko Takeuchi. They credit their professional start in comics to website HelloGiggles, which gave them a column in 2015. Xunise was featured in The Nib and Shondaland when King Features Syndicate asked them to create a Popeye tribute strip. In 2017 they won the Ignatz Award for Promising New Talent for their self-published "Say Her Name", an autobiographical story about police brutality.

In 2020, they became the second Black woman at the time, after Barbara Brandon-Croft, to contribute to a nationally syndicated comic strip when they became one of the Six Chix. With their Six Chix debut, Xunise also became the first Black nonbinary cartoonist to be nationally syndicated.

They taught at DePaul University and are a lecturer at the School of the Art Institute of Chicago.

In 2024, they released their first graphic novel, Punk Rock Karaoke.
