= Malik Sajad =

- Born: Sajad Rasool Malik; Srinagar, Jammu and Kashmir, India
- Education: MA in Visual Art, Goldsmiths, University of London (2012)
- Occupation: Graphic Novelist
- Known for: Munnu: A Boy From Kashmir.
- Notable work: Short stories such as Identity Card, The Posterman, Endangered Species, Facebooked, Side Effects of Fairness Cream and, A Wedding Under Curfew. .
- Website: http://www.maliksajad.com

Malik Sajad is a graphic novelist based in Srinagar, Jammu and Kashmir.

His debut graphic novel, Munnu - A Boy from Kashmir was released with critical acclaim and won the Verve Story Teller of The Year award. The debut novel was made a part of the permanent collection (Artists' Books) at the Brooklyn Museum in New York and his sketches have been compared to the work of Art Spiegelman such as Maus and work of Marjane Satrapi such as Persepolis.

Sajad's debut novel was released in 2015 in Britain. An Italian translation by Juan Scassa was published by add editore on 6 May 2020 under the title Munnu. Un ragazzo del Kashmir (ISBN 9788867832651).

== Recognitions ==
Malik received an Inlaks Scholar (2011) and completed a master's degree in Visual Art at Goldsmiths, University of London in 2012. She's also a OMI Francis Greenburger (2013) fellow. In 2023, Sajad was selected as a fellow of the DAAD Artists-in-Berlin Program in the visual arts category.

== As a cartoonist ==
Sajad was 14 when he started working as a cartoonist, for a regional newspaper, Greater Kashmir. It was a lead story in 2005-06 by journalist, Arif Shafi Wani about endangered Kashmiri deer in Kashmiri forests, from where he drew inspiration, for his debut novel, by comparing Kashmiris with Hanguls as humanoids.

== Animation ==
Sajad has also worked as an animation filmmaker. His short films include Hopscotch (2010), a one-and-a-half-minute film, and Father and Son (2012), a twelve-minute film.

== Influences ==
Graphic novels such as Relatively Indolent But Relentless by Matt Freedman, Fun Home by Alison Bechdel. Among others, Sajad also likes works of Käthe Kollwitz, Lynd Ward, Keith Haring, and work of Betye Saar.

== Critical reception ==
Munnu: A Boy from Kashmir has been examined in academic studies of graphic narratives and political violence. In a 2018 article in South Asian Review, Andrew Hock Soon Ng analysed the representation of violence in the novel, focusing on the relationship between its narrative form and subject matter.

In a 2021 study published in Studies in Comics, Lan Dong examined the relationship between childhood, political conflict and the use of anthropomorphic Kashmir stags in Munnu, as well as the graphic novel's representation of everyday life during the Kashmir conflict.

== Positions on Kashmir conflict ==
Sajad believes that the conflict in Kashmir has 'shaken people like an earthquake'. He says, "everyone witnessed and felt the devastating tremor; some houses fell and the families were buried, some houses developed cracks and some stayed unharmed. This changed the face, structure and traditional landscape of Kashmir forever."
