= Roya Ramezani =

- Born: 1989 or 1990 (age 35–36); Iran
- Occupations: Product Designer and Technologist
- Website: Official website

Roya Ramezani (Persian: رؤیا رمضانی) is an Iranian designer and women's rights campaigner. She was selected for the BBC's 100 Women programme in 2017.

== Career ==
Roya Ramezani was born in Northern Iran and was raised in Tehran, but moved to Toronto, Canada, at the age of to be with her extended family and study. She studied at three different universities, including York University and the School of Visual Arts in New York City. She began to work in a diverse team in Silicon Valley as an intern at Google, but realised that the women in the team were not interacting in meetings to the same degree as their male counterparts. This led to her thesis at SVA entitled "Exponent: Amplifying the Female Voices in Tech Discourse". Inspired by the Hansen Writing Ball, she developed a new keyboard to empower women to use more strong language by reducing the size of the keys and adding full-word shortcuts such as "claim", "disagree" and "insist". She moved to San Francisco, California, where she started working for JPMorgan in their branch innovation team.

She was named to the BBC's 100 Women programme in 2017. As part of this, she spoke at an event at the Computer History Museum in Mountain View, California, about the issues faced by women in the field of technology development. This included developments in wearable technology and augmented reality. Ramezani's work in this area has been praised by her bosses at JPMorgan.

Ramezani also created an art installation in Palo Alto, California, which was unveiled on October 5, 2017, the same day as the initial news story on the Harvey Weinstein sexual misconduct allegations. The artwork, built on an a-frame, featured the hashtag "#Me Too". This hashtag had originally been coined in 2006 by Tarana Burke, although Ramezani said the inspiration for her work had come from a sexual assault she suffered while at a university and the response from her friends. In the days after the installation, the actress Alyssa Milano used the hashtag in relation to Weinstein, causing it to go viral.
