= Patryck de Froidmont =

Belgian cartoonist

Patryck de Froidmont is a Belgian cartoonist.

He began his career working together with Jean-Louis Boccar in the early 1980s. Together, they created Dinguement Vôtre in Spirou and Nos Premiers Pas as well as Le P'tit Quartier De Mont-en-France in Le Soir. In most of their comics, the artists themselves are the main characters. Later, they created video clips, among others for Dire Straits, and formed the comical duo Les Indiens.

== Works ==
- Le triangle ombilical; illustrated by Jean-Louis Boccar; scenario Patryck de Froidmont. Louvain-la-Neuve : Ed. du Miroir, 1984. OCLC 80070061
- Musk; Jean-Louis Boccar; Patryck de Froidmont; [S.l.] : Armonia, cop. 1986. OCLC 64379816

== Sources ==
- www.defroidmont.com Official website
- Patryck de Froidmont on Amnesty International website
