= Rupert Fawcett =

British cartoonist and writer

Rupert Fawcett is a British cartoonist and writer, who is best known for his critically acclaimed comic strips, Fred (produced since 1989), Daddy and Off The Leash. Fred was published in Midweek Magazine for two years, then The Mail on Sunday for four years. The success of Fred led to the sale of over nine million Fred greetings cards in the UK, Australia and New Zealand and a bestselling range of merchandise. Rupert has appeared on Good Morning Britain, The Big Breakfast, Midweek and numerous other TV and radio programmes. His current projects include Off The Leash animation and various books.

== Personal life ==
Rupert was born in Holland Park, West London in 1957. He attended Fox Primary School, Notting Hill, Holland Park Comprehensive School, Wimbledon School of Art and Bath Academy of Art. Rupert dropped out of art school in 1977 to form a punk band in which he was singer and lyricist. He later completed a two-year training course in counselling and whilst working as a trainee counsellor at the Charter Clinic in Chelsea, he invented Fred. After receiving over 80 rejection letters from publishers and newspapers, Fred was taken on by greeting card company Paperlink and quickly became a great success, selling millions of cards and generating a succession of books. Rupert has continued to work periodically as a counsellor in private practice and several treatment centres, including four years at The Priory. In 2006 and 2007 he helped set up and establish an addiction treatment centre in Amsterdam. It was the first 12-step based treatment centre in The Netherlands, and the first of its kind to treat computer games addiction.

In 2012, Rupert created Off The Leash, launching it on its own Facebook page, Off The Leash Dog Cartoons. Off The Leash now has a following of over 800,000 people on Facebook and three bestselling books have been published. Rupert is presently working on his first cat cartoon book, On The Prowl - The Secret Life of Cats, which will be published in October 2016. He's also busy writing scripts for his Off The Leash animation series and developing other book ideas.

In January 2024, he had a stroke and spent 6 months as an inpatient of Charing Cross Hospital and Roehampton Rehab Centre.

He lives in Barnes, South West London, with his wife and three children.

== Books ==
=== Fred ===
- Fred (Arrow, 1990)
- More Fred (Statics, 1991)
- The Extraordinary World of Fred (Statics, 1992)
- The Continued Adventures of Fred (Statics, 1993)
- The Very Best of Fred (Statics, 1994)
- Carry On Fred (Headline, 1994)
- At Home with Fred (Headline, 1995)
- Pure Fred (Headline, 1996)
- The One and Only Fred (Headline, 1997)
- Fred and Penelope's Book of Love (Headline, 1998)
- The Best of Fred (Headline, 1998)
- The Little Book of Fred (Headline, 1998)
- The Best Bit's of Fred (Headline, 1999)
- The Second Little Book of Fred (Headline, 1999)
- The Third Little Book of Fred (Headline, 2000)
- The Big Fat Fred Collection (Headline, 2000)
- Little Book of Fred (Demand Media, 2013)

=== Close Encounters ===
- Close Encounters (Headline, 1993)

=== Daddy ===
- Daddy (Boxtree, 1996)
- We Love Daddy (Boxtree, 1997)
- The Best of Daddy (Boxtree, 1998)

=== The Letters of Oscar Wendlow ===
- The Letters of Oscar Wendlow (Boxtree, 1999)

=== Off The Leash ===
- Off the Leash - The Secret Life of Dogs (Macmillan, 2013)
- Off the Leash - A Dog's Best Friend (Macmillan, 2014)
- Off The Leash - It's a Dog's Life (Macmillan, 2015)
- Off The Leash - Doggy Doodles (Frances Lincoln, 2016)

=== On The Prowl ===
- On the Prowl - The Secret Life of Cats (Macmillan, 2016)
