= William Haefeli =

American cartoonist

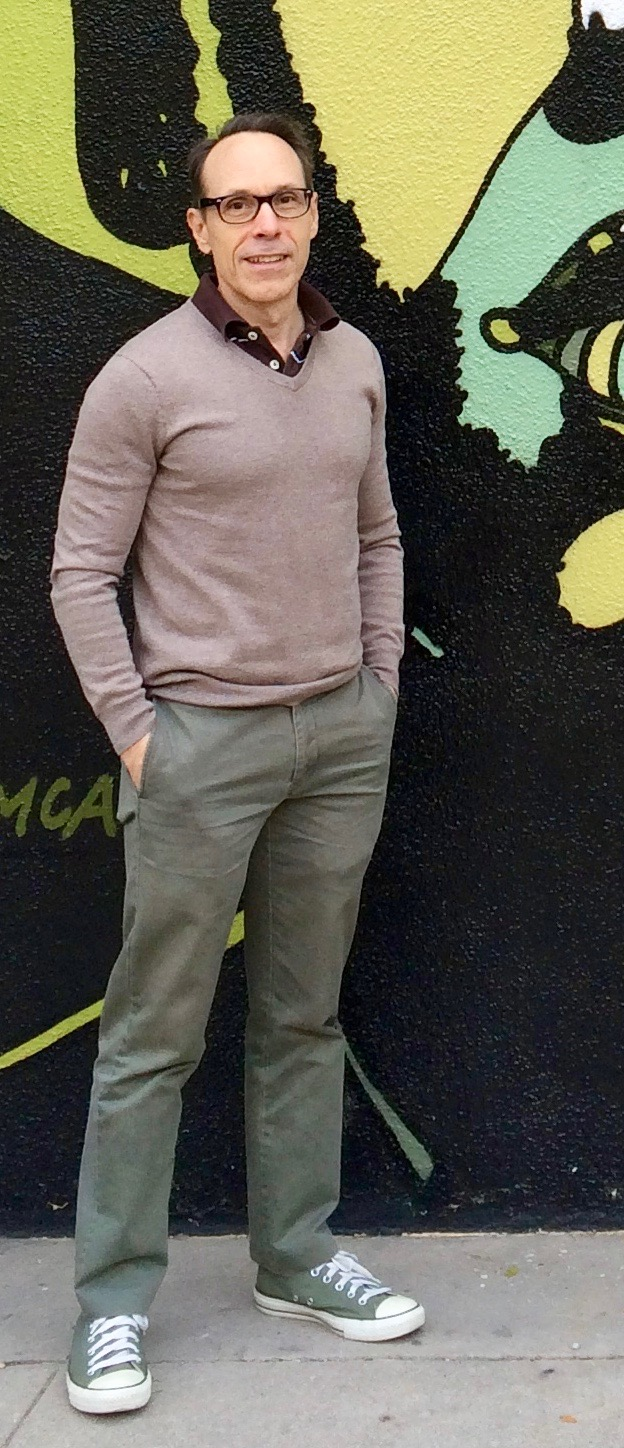
- Bill Haefeli, 2015, Los Angeles
- Born: August 14, 1953 (age 73); Philadelphia
- Education: Duke University, Chicago Academy of Fine Arts
- Known for: Cartoonist, The New Yorker

William Haefeli (born August 14, 1953) is an American cartoonist and a staff cartoonist for The New Yorker. His single-panel cartoons, drawn with a distinct graphics style, depict contemporary life through observational humor. Haefeli is known for his ground-breaking inclusion of gay characters on a regular basis in The New Yorker cartoons.

== Early life ==
Haefeli grew up on the well-to-do Philadelphia Main Line. His father was an advertising copywriter and his mother a homemaker. As a child, Haefeli perused The New Yorker cartoons, relating to their themes of that time such as people commuting to work by train, going to Ivy League football games, and attending cocktail parties.

He was graduated from Duke University in 1975 with a degree in psychology and attended the Chicago Academy of Fine Arts (1975-1977).

== Career ==
Haefeli began his cartooning career in Chicago. His first cartoon was purchased by the Saturday Review of Literature in 1978. Placements in a variety of other publications followed.

Haefeli was a regular contributor to the British humor magazine Punch (The London Charivari) for five years before it ceased publication in 1992. "...the dynamics of (the) Battle of the Sexes was superbly translated with savage irony by William Haefeli, one of a handful of great American cartoonists working for Punch, in what could be described as his New Man and New Woman cartoons of the 80s and 90s," wrote Andre Gailani, Manager at Punch, Ltd., in 2014.

Haefeli’s first New Yorker cartoon appeared in 1998 and his cartoons have continued to appear in the magazine regularly since then. Bob Mankoff, the cartoon editor of The New Yorker from 1997 to 2017, said of Haefeli, “Bill’s cartoon artistry is unsurpassed, as is the comedy of manners, mores, and morals his cartoons delineate for the gay, the straight, and everyone in between.”

== Personal life ==
Haefeli is openly gay. He relocated to Los Angeles from Chicago in 1995 and continues to make his home in LA.
