= Ken Pyne =

British cartoonist

Ken Pyne (born 30 April 1951) is a British cartoonist.

Aged 16, he had his first cartoon published in Punch, and has since had regular work in Private Eye, many British national newspapers and other publications.

He illustrated cartoons in six editions of Campaign for Real Ale's Good Beer Guide, in 1985–9, and 1992.

Pyne lives and works in Hampstead, London.
