= David Messer =

Australian cartoonist

- Born: 1963 (age 62–63); Australia
- Occupations: Writer and cartoonist

David Messer is an Australian cartoonist. He is best known for his comic book adaptations of Shakespeare's Macbeth and The Tempest, both published in Australia by Random House in late 2005. Each book features the full text, complete with footnotes, and close to 1,000 illustrated panels per book. He has produced a full-colour version of Romeo and Juliet.

Other books he has illustrated include Malcolm Knox's humorous history of Australia, Australia in 1788 Words or Less, Paul Clitheroe's Make Your Fortune by 40 and Why Should I? (a guide to the law for children). Messer has also contributed cartoons and illustrations to numerous newspapers and magazines, including The Spectator in the UK, and The Sydney Morning Herald, The Australian, and The Bulletin in Australia.

Messer has been reviewing books for The Sydney Morning Herald since at least 2006.

== Bibliography ==
- William Shakespeare's Macbeth illustrated and adapted by David Messer, Random House, Australia, 2005
- William Shakespeare's The Tempest illustrated and adapted by David Messer, Random House, Australia, 2005
