= Joan Vizcarra =

Spanish cartoonist

Joan Vizcarra Carreras (born 1967 in Montblanc, Tarragona) is a Spanish cartoonist. He has several books published by the Spanish language satirical magazine El Jueves.

Although his first love was music -and more specifically the rock and roll of classic musicians like Elvis Presley- very soon he fell in love with painting. In 1985, he moved to Barcelona, where he studied arts in the University. While there, he discovered that he had an ability to draw caricatures.

Since 1991 he works for El Jueves, perhaps Spain's most important satiric magazine. He has contributed to other publications like El Periódico de Catalunya or the Catalan newspaper Avui. In 1995 you begin weekly collaborations for El Periódico de Catalunya. Later he also collaborates in the supplement of the newspaper El Mundo. In 1997 he was appointed Professor of Humor by the university of Alcalá de Henares.

== Work ==
=== Art works ===
- Cartel promocional para la producción teatral “La extraña pareja” 1998.
- Portadas de discos de Mojinos Escozíos “Las margaritas son flores del campo” 1999, “Con cuernos y a lo loco” 2005 “Semos unos máquinas” 2013.
- Realización en bronze caricatura “Dream Team” para Museo del Barça 2001.
- Creación de caricaturas en chocolate para Escribà 2005.
- Diseño de personajes para la Falla de El Jueves “Archiduque Carlos Chiva” Valencia 2006.
- Ilustraciones para portadas de libros “Temas de hoy” Editorial Planeta 2006.
- Diseño Cartel “Festes de Santa Eulália” Barcelona 2007.
- Imagen visual Campaña Cruzcampo “Cárnaval Cádiz” 2007.
- Creación línea de productos merchandising “Vizcarra” 2008.
- Realización Baraja del Barça para El Periódico y Sport 2008.
- Ilustraciones para el libro “Caràcters” Editorial Obrador Edéndum 2009.
- Realización de esculturas en 3D en colaboración con la EAP 2009–2014.
- Realización del documental “Dibujando a Vizcarra” (H. Lagares&I. Vilallonga) 2012.
- Ilustraciones para el libro “Més enllà de l´èxit” Deu i Once Edicions 2013
- Ilustración para portada del disco de Ska-P “99%” 2013.
- Participación en TedxReus 2013 (Conferéncias sobre Creatividad)
- Sailor Donald Duck's Portrait - Original Painting - Original Artwork

=== Books ===
- Vizcarra. Caricaturas (1994, Col. Titánic núm 7-Ediciones El Jueves)
- Esto es Hollywood (1999, libro recopilatorio para la revista El Jueves)
- Lo más mejor de Vizcarra (2004, Col. Lo más mejor núm 14-Ediciones El Jueves)
- Hollywood y otras hierbas (2008, Luxury Gold Collection, RBA/El Jueves)
- Rock stars y otros animales (2008, Luxury Gold Collection, RBA/El Jueves)
- 25 años de Caricaturas (2015 Ediciones JA Hidalgo)

=== Expos ===
- Exposición antológica para la Bienal de Caricaturtas de Ourense (1998)
- Exposición de originales para el Certámen “Cómic de la Massana” Andorra (2000)
- Exposició retrospectiva para la Bienal Humoralia de Lleida (2001)
- Exposición colectiva en el 25 Aniversario de la revista El Jueves, Barcelona (2002)
- Exposición individual para el XIX Concurso de Cómic “Noble Villa de Portugalete” (2005)
- Exposición de caricaturas para la Mostra del Cómic de Cornellà (2005)
- Exposición retrospectiva para las Festes del Centenari a Montblanc (2006)
- Exposición individual para el Certámen Audiovisual de Cabra, Córdoba (2006)
- Muestra gráfica colectiva “O debuxo por diante”, Xunta de Galicia (2007)
- Exposición individual para “Santa Cruz Diseña”, Tenerife (2008)
- Exposición de originales para la Minicom Internacional, Girona (2011)
- Exposición “Con V de Vizcarra” Illa Diagonal Barcelona (2011)
- Exposición “Con V de Vizcarra” Badajoz (2011)
- Exposición permanente de originales en el Local Cool Hotel International, Barcelona (2013)
- Exposición de originales “La Fauna de Vizcarra” El Corte Inglés, Barcelona (2013)
