= Brad Diller =

American cartoonist and illustrator

- Born: Bradley Dillard; June 27, 1955 (age 71); Charleston, West Virginia
- Other name: Dillard
- Education: Art Institute of Pittsburgh
- Occupations: Cartoonist and illustrator

Brad Diller (born June 27, 1955) is an American cartoonist and illustrator whose work has been self-syndicated and featured in newspapers across the United States. In 2011, cartoons from his strip Funday Morning were turned into the coffee-table book The Neighbors Have Two Flamingos.

== Early life and education ==
Born in Charleston, West Virginia, Brad Diller is the second of four kids. After his family moved to Dallas, Texas for a brief stint while Brad was in junior high school, Diller moved back to Charleston to finish high school, or at least something equivalent. After earning his GED, Brad moved to Houston, Texas to pursue a career in carpet laying. In 1976, fed up with Texas and upholstery, Diller moved into a flophouse in Daytona Beach, Florida. After two years of what Diller called the "good life," he rejoined society after his mother offered to help him acquire a scholarship to the Art Institute of Pittsburgh. Graduating with his associate degree in 1980, Diller took a job in advertising. After leaving his advertising job, Diller moved immediately into bar tending full-time, which is where he was surrounded in the subject matter that would influence a number of his future comic strips.

== Career ==
On his 33rd birthday, Diller was hired to be a newsroom artist by The Daily Mail (1998–2000).

Diller’s first cartoons ran in 1992 when he pitched his cartoons to the editor at The Daily Mail. After creating 12 rough sketches for a weekly slot, Diller got the editor’s approval to begin running a weekly cartoon. While producing his weekly single-panel cartoon, Diller began pursuing syndication. His cartoons were soon featured in dozens of papers across the country, and despite his high approval rating among readers, editors didn’t particularly like his cartoons. After chasing syndication for nearly eight years, Diller quit the newspaper business to work as a freelance illustrator before opening Access Pass and Design with his business partners in 2002.

In 2009, Diller started FundayMorning.com. His brother introduced him to Facebook and it was the perfect platform for Diller because he began receiving something from readers he’d never before received in any real capacity: interaction. His readers started commenting on the cartoons he posted and he understood the reach of his readership. Today, Diller lives in Nevada with his wife and cat, and continues to publish cartoons on FundayMorning.com and Funnies Extra. He published his first book, The Neighbors Have Two Flamingos, in 2011 and is currently working on his second book, which will be accompanied by a string of live speaking events.

== Awards ==
Diller won a Readers Award from a newspaper out of Boston in the late 1990s and they spelled his name wrong (Dillard) on the certificate. When they sent him the actual award certificate, they reassured him they were not going to start paying him for his work just because the readers thought he was funny. Other awards include:

- West Virginia Press Association Award 1990
- Tennessee Press Association Award 1996-1998
- Nevada Press Association Award Award 1998-2000

== Influences ==
When Diller was a young boy, he liked anything that was drawn and was funny. When he started drawing, there was not one specific person he tried to copy, but he liked the cartoon Andy Capp. Diller couldn't read at the time (he was 6 years old), but he could understand Andy Capp. From an early age, Diller was drawn to cartoons that took very little dialogue to tell a story.
