= Attila Adorjany =

Canadian artist and designer

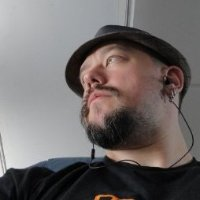
- Born: Attila Gyula Manasse Damasdy - Adorjany
- Areas: Writer, Penciller, Artist, Inker, Publisher, Colourist
- Pseudonyms: 600poundgorilla, TILT
- Notable works: Metaphysical Neuroma

Attila Adorjany is a commercial illustrator, web designer and motiongraphics designer, creative consultant and comic book creator.

== Nominations and awards ==
- 2011, Contributing Artist, POPGUN vol. 4 Awarded, Harvey Award, Best Anthology.
- 2011: Nominated, Shuster Award, Best Webcomic —, Metaphysical Neuroma
- 2010: Nominated, Shuster Award, Best Webcomic—, Metaphysical Neuroma
