= Handa Bhonda =

Bengali comic by Narayan Debnath

Hada Bhodar Kandokarkhana

হাঁদা ভোঁদার কাণ্ডকারখানা
- Author: Narayan Debnath
- Illustrator: Narayan Debnath
- Magazine: Shuktara

Batul the Great, Nonte Fonte, Bahadur Beral

Handa Bhonda (Bengali: হাঁদা-ভোঁদা), also referred to as Hada Bhoda is a Bengali comic-strip (and later comic book) creation of Narayan Debnath, which originally was serialized for the children's monthly magazine Shuktara. The comics have appeared in book form. A popular animation series based on the characters has also been filmed.

== Origin ==
The suggestion to work in comics in Bengali came from the editors at Deb Sahitya Kuthir publishing house. Also the name Handa-Bhonda was their suggestion. Debnath had been familiar with foreign made comics but comics in Bengali had, by his own admission, yet to take off. First published in 1962, Handa-Bhonda became an instant success and were printed in Shuktara every month till 2017. Handa-Bhonda was initially penciled and inked by Debnath and had no colored frames. Later it would be printed in gray-scale.

== Theme ==
The stories feature two young boys, one slender (Handa) and the other bulky (Bhonda). Out of the two, Handa is more mischievous and tries to put others, Bhonda in particular, in trouble. In the end however, in most of the stories Handa gets punished due to his follies.

They have a paternal uncle who has a bad temper, Handa always uses his brains to avoid work being given to him by his uncle (Pisemosai in Bengali) Handa also often tricks Bhonda in doing stuff that would get him a scolding or thrashing from pisemosai but at the end of the story he invariably ends up getting beaten himself. In some of the stories, they work together.

Their paternal uncle, always puts Handa and Bhonda in some kind of work, and Handa always either sends Bhonda to work or he takes the money and eats in restaurants like 'Abar Khabo Restaurant' and many other places. Bhonda has a little friend named Bocha whom Handa considers as Bhonda's disciple ('chela'in Bengali).

Their paternal aunt appears in few of the stories of Handa and Bhonda. Handa Bhonda has gained popularity and is still read by thousands of readers and lovers of comics.

== See also ==
- Batul The Great
- Nonte Fonte
