= Barry Bradfield =

Canadian artist

- Born: April 1, 1981 (age 44); Ottawa, Ontario, Canada
- Occupations: Artist, Toy and Collectible Designer
- Website: basement24.com

Barry Bradfield (born April 1, 1981) is a Canadian artist known for his work in the field of toy and collectible design.

== Early life ==
Born in Ottawa, Ontario, Bradfield developed an interest in art during his youth.

From June 1994 to July 1997 his untitled comic strip was published in the Ottawa Citizen. The comic, usually one-panel in length, ranged in topics from political humor to slices of life.

In 1998, Bradfield created Batman: The Animated Homepage which featured information and images from Batman: The Animated Series. Following a merger with Superman: The Animated Message Board created by James Harvey, the site was rebranded as The World's Finest. Bradfield later left the site to pursue other interests.

Bradfield has been creating original material and characters since 1994 including his superhero genre parody "Sinus-Man". He also collaborated with Mike Jakubinek on their spy genre parody, "James Bean: Double-Oh-Nothing" which was featured in an animated short in 2002.

He pursued studies in Animation Television at Algonquin College, where he earned his diploma.

== Career ==
Bradfield began work in the collectible toy industry at Art Asylum, and continues to work with Diamond Select Toys and Gentle Giant Ltd. His roles have included product design and project management, contributing to lines such as Minimates, Vinimates, and various statues and busts. Notable projects include designs for Batman, Star Wars, and Marvel Comics collectibles.

From 2014 to 2017, Bradfield illustrated the Minimates themed incentive covers for various comic books published by Marvel Comics.

== Bibliography ==
=== Marvel Comics ===
- The Amazing Spider-Man #1, Vol. 3 (Diamond Retailer Summit 2014 Exclusive)
- Uncanny X-Men #23, Vol. 3 (Previews San Diego Comic Con 2014 Exclusive)
- Civil War #1, Vol. 2 (Previews San Diego Comic Con 2015 Exclusive)
- Secret Wars #4, Vol. 1 (Previews San Diego Comic Con 2015 Exclusive)
- Deadpool: The World's Greatest Comic Magazine #15 (Previews San Diego Comic Con 2016 Exclusive)
- Champions #1, Vol. 2 (New York Comic Con 2016 Exclusive)
- Doctor Strange and the Sorcerers Supreme #1, Vol. 1 (New York Comic Con 2016 Exclusive)
- Deadpool Kills The Marvel Universe Again #1, Vol. 1 (Previews San Diego Comic Con 2017 Exclusive)
- Secret Empire #5, Vol. 1 (Previews San Diego Comic Con 2017 Exclusive)
- Peter Parker: The Spectacular Spider-Man #1, Vol. 1 (Previews San Diego Comic Con 2017 Exclusive)
