= George L. Houghton =

U.S. Medal of Honor recipient

- Born: August 28, 1841; Yarmouth County, Nova Scotia, British North America
- Died: February 25, 1917 (aged 75)
- Burial place: Orting, Washington
- Military career
- Allegiance: United States of America
- Branch: United States Army
- Service years: 1862 - 1865
- Rank: Private
- Unit: 104th Illinois Volunteer Infantry Regiment
- Conflicts: American Civil War
- Awards: Medal of Honor

George L. Houghton (August 28, 1841 - February 25, 1917) was an American soldier who fought in the American Civil War. Houghton received his country's highest award for bravery during combat, the Medal of Honor. Houghton's medal was won for his actions at Elk River, Tennessee, where he led a party that saved a bridge, on July 2, 1863. He was honored with the award on March 27, 1900.

Houghton was born in Yarmouth County, Nova Scotia in Canada, and entered service in Brookfield, Illinois. He was buried in Orting, Washington.

== Medal of Honor citation ==
The President of the United States of America, in the name of Congress, takes pleasure in presenting the Medal of Honor to Private George L. Houghton, United States Army, for extraordinary heroism on 2 July 1863, while serving with Company D, 104th Illinois Infantry, in action at Elk River, Tennessee. Private Hughton voluntarily joined a small party that, under a heavy fire, captured a stockade and saved the bridge.

== See also ==
- List of American Civil War Medal of Honor recipients: G–L
