= Max Rep =

American comic strips

Max Rep: Mr. Astrotitan 2206 and Max Rep in the Age of Astrotitans were comic strips appearing originally in FLEX in the late 1980s, and then in Muscular Development magazine throughout the 90's, and a Comic Book published by Dumbbell Press and created by illustrator Lyman Dally after the strip's cancellation which was initiated by Dally over creative differences. After numerous fan inquiries, requests, and some persuasion, Dally began the twice weekly webcomic Steroids 'n' Asteroids with Quadra Blu in 2011.

Taking place in the 23rd century, Max Rep: Mr. Astrotitan 2206 was a sci-fi parody involving Max Rep's ongoing heroics and relationship with Quadra Blu. The comic strip ran in the 90's and was usually two pages. When the editors of Muscular Development requested that the strip take a different direction with Max & Quadra both being "downsized" and offering "instructional instead of serialized" content, Dally refused and cancelled the strip. The cancellation coincided with the beginning of an intended story arc which would have had Quadra Blu quit bodybuilding to pursue a career as a fitness model, much to Max's chagrin.

The comic book Max Rep in the Age of Astrotitans was black & white and ran for two issues and published independently from Muscular Development. The comic book differed from the strip by rebooting Max Rep's origin story. The webcomic Steroids 'n' Asteroids tells Quadra Blu's origin story and is a partial reboot. In it, Quadra leaves her homeworld of Thyra for Earth to work for the company Acromion Processes promoting Andropops.

== Characters ==
- Max Rep - The titular hero of the story. Max was featured on the cover of the January, 1991 issue of Muscular Development with Sandy Riddell and again with Quadra Blu for the November, 1993 issue.
- Quadra Blu - Max Rep's friend, Quadra Blu is a blue-haired amazon from the blue water planet Pumtilicus (an Earth colony) and the top female pro bodybuilder in 2206. Her relationship with Rep alternates between platonic and slightly romantic. Dally once described her as "An object of lust for males and a role model for females, Quadra embodies bodybuilding's most positive qualities." According to a poster included with the November, 1993 Muscular Development, her stats are:

Height: 5 ft. 9in.
Weight: 215 lbs
Arms: 19¼ in. (cold)
Chest: 50 in.
Waist: 29 in.
Thigh: 33⅓ in.

In the origin story webcomic Steroids 'n' Asteroids, Quadra comes from the planet Thyra and initially has no experience as a bodybuilder despite already possessing a substantial physique.

- Razer-Cutt - Max's "most formidable rival". According to Dally "I needed a super-ripped character to offset Max's mass."
