= Horacio Sandoval =

- Born: Horacio Miguel Sandoval Pérez; September 27, 1971 (age 55)
- Areas: Penciller, inker
- Notable works: "Blue Demon, Jr. - El Legado"

Horacio Miguel Sandoval Pérez (born September 27, 1971, in Mexico City) is a comic book artist, member of !Ka-Boom¡ Estudio.

== Career ==
His first professional assignment (1989–90) was as the artist of Los Pequeños Muppets (Muppet Babies), Los Picapiedra (The Flintstones), Los Pequeños Picapiedra (The Flintstone Kids) and Tom and Jerry.

He worked as the artist for Editorial Toukan's activity book based on Akira Toriyama's Dragon Ball franchise, Supercampeones (Captain Tsubasa) and project Bugs (1994–1996).

In 1995, he joins ¡Ka-Boom! Estudio. Worked in ¡Ka-Boom! el Cómic #0 one-shot, as the artist for the Spectrum character (later known as Xpctrm and then XPTM), for the now defunct Editorial Antea.

Collaborated in the "Karmatrón y los Transformables" 2-minute animation short production with ¡Ka-Boom! Estudio and Ramm Productions (1997).

The only Mexican, after Sergio Aragonés, then Oscar González Loyo, to be an official Simpsons Comics artist for Bongo Comics.

Made the artwork for the Mexican Government Presidency comic propaganda, 2 de Julio, El Cambio en México ya Nadie lo Para (2002), and Acciones (2003), for President Vicente Fox' administration.

From July to October 2005, he worked in the monthly title Blue Demon Jr., El Legado, along with writer Susana Romero.

He's been designing and preparing forthcoming projects such as Xpctrm, and Tierra Cuatro (Earth Four).
