= Narayan Debnath =

Indian comic artist and writer (1925–2022)

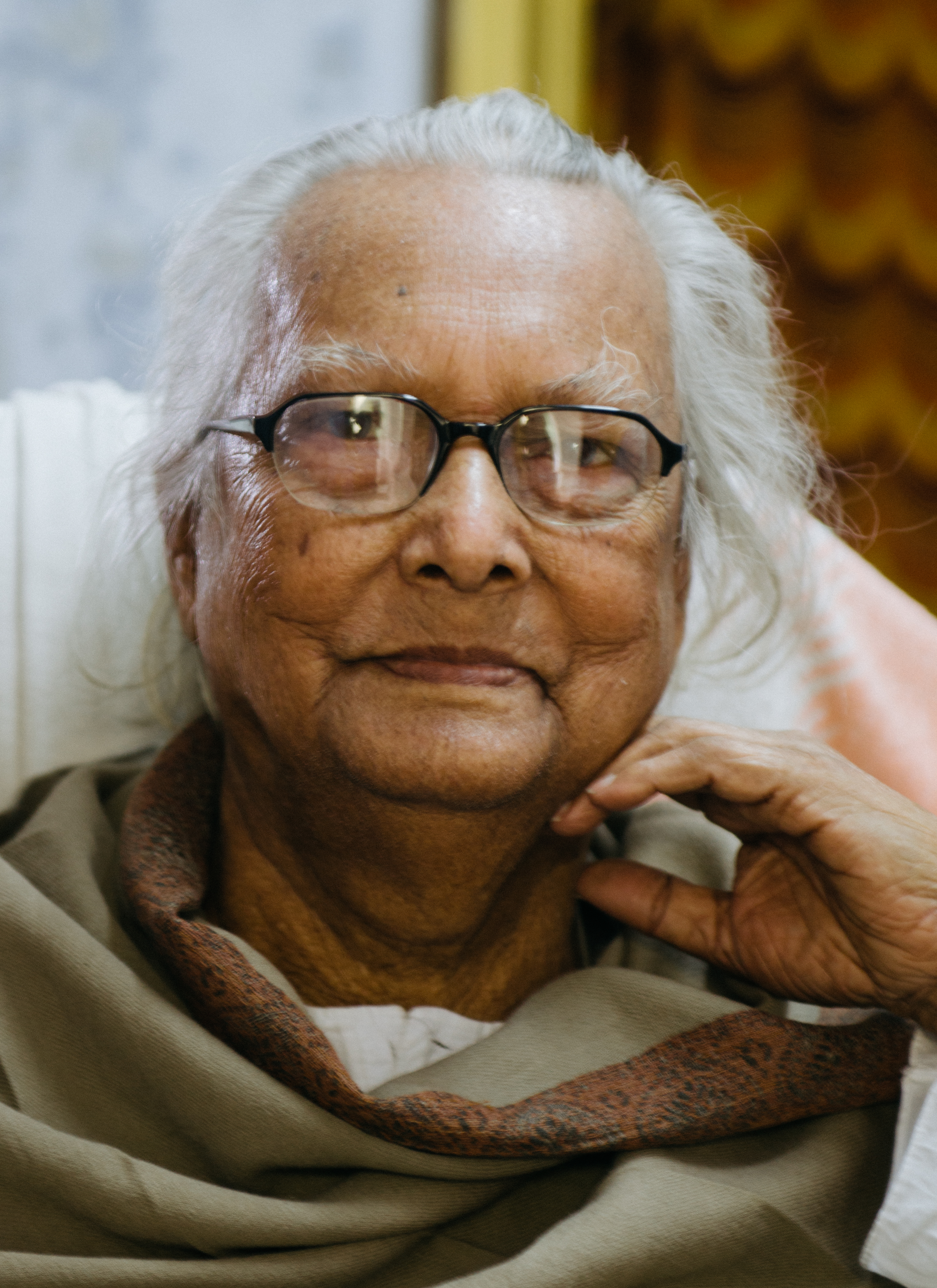
- Debnath in 2013
- Born: 1925 (Shibpur) Howrah, Bengal Presidency, British Raj
- Died: 18 January 2022 (aged 96) Kolkata, West Bengal, India
- Areas: West Bengal, India
- Notable works: Bantul the Great, Handa Bhonda, Nonte Fonte
- Awards: President's Special Recognition Award (2007), Sahitya Akademi (2013), Banga Bibhushan (2013), D. Litt. by Rabindra Bharati University (2015), Padma Shri by Government of India (2021)
- Spouse: Tara Debnath
- Children: 2

Narayan Debnath ( 25 November 1925 – 18 January 2022) was an Indian comics artist, writer and illustrator who created the Bengali comic strips Handa Bhonda, Bantul the Great, and Nonte Phonte in 1962, 1965, and 1969 respectively. He holds the record of longest running comics by an individual artiste for Handa Bhonda comics series which completed its continuous 53 years of running. He was the first and only comics artist in India who has received a D. Litt. degree. In 2022, Debnath was awarded Padma Shri, the fourth highest civilian award in India.

== Early life ==
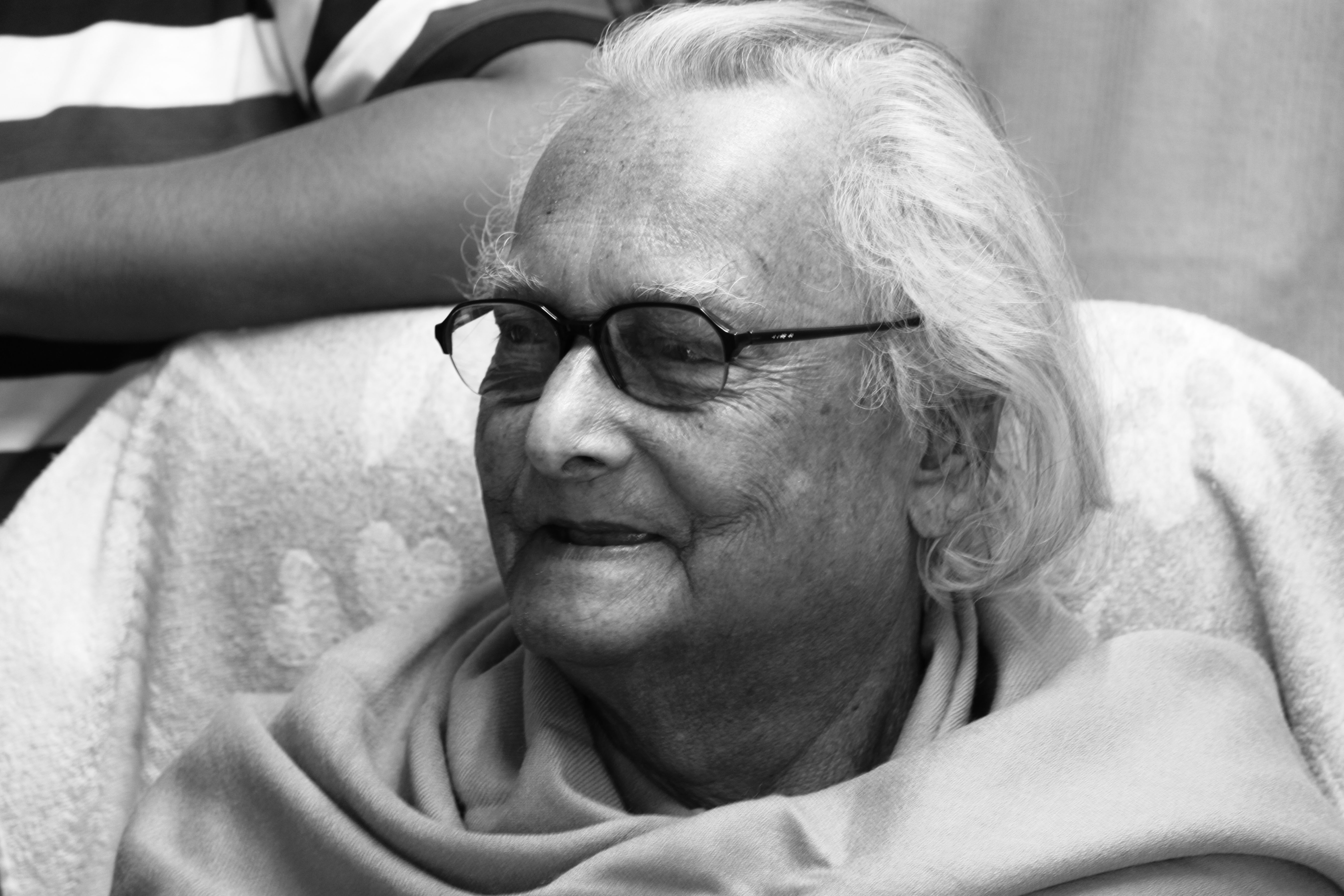
Narayan Debnath in his study.

Narayan Debnath was born and spent most of his life living in Shibpur, Howrah, India. His family hailed from Bikrampur in what is now Bangladesh but had migrated to Shibpur before his birth. In an interview published by Laalmati Publication in Narayan Debnath Comics Samagra, Debnath confessed that he was interested in visual arts from a very early age. The family business was retailing gold and he had ample scope to design patterns for jewellery. During the time of World War II, Debnath would study fine arts at the Indian Art College for five years. He did not continue to get his degree but instead discontinued in his final year. For the next few years he freelanced for advertising agencies creating movie slides and logos. Debnath recounts in Narayan Debnath Comics Samagra, Vol. 2 that on the day of his wedding Gandhi was assassinated, which caused much inconvenience to the guests. The four volumes of Narayan Debnath Comics Samagra provide rich information about the life of the author.

In 1950 he was introduced to Dev Sahitya Kutir, a major publishing house through a friend. People such as Pratul Chandra Banerjee, Shailo Chakraborty, Balaibandhu Roy, and Purnachandra Chakraborti were associated with the press at the time. From 1950 to 1961 he illustrated a number of children's books including adventure novels and Western classics in translation. His journey in comics started in 1962 with 'Handa-Bhonda' in Shuktara.

He began as a freelancing comics-artist and soon went for comics on his own. However, when still a struggling freelancer, he was instructed by the publisher to adopt 'well accepted foreign comics' to make comics for their magazine(s) to get easy business.

== Introduction to comics ==
His works in comics in Bengali came from the editors at Dev Sahitya Kutir. Also the name 'Handa Bhonda' was their suggestion. Debnath had been familiar with foreign comics, but comics in Bengal, to his belief, had yet to take off. 'Shiyal Pandit', a comic strip created by Pratul Chandra Lahiri for the Jugantar newspaper was one of the earliest ones. Handa-Bhonda became an instant success and continues to be printed in Shuktara every month. Handa-Bhonda was initially penciled and inked by Debnath and had no coloured frames. Later it would be printed in the grey-scale.

Narayan Debnath's first comic characters in color were for the comic strip and book 'Bantul The Great'. By Debnath's admission, he thought up the idea of the superhero while returning from College Street, Calcutta. The name came to him instantly and he thought up the figure of the protagonist rapidly. Batul the Great, written and illustrated with red and black ink made his first appearance in comic strips in the May–June (Bengali Baishak), 1965 issue of the monthly children's periodical called Shuktara, published by Dev Sahitya Kutir (henceforth DSK) publishing house. This character has similarities with Desperate Dan. Apart from Batul the Great, Debnath also illustrated Rabi Chobi (1961), written by Bimal Ghosh about the childhood days of Rabindranath Tagore. His Rajar Raja/Chobite Vivekananda (1962) recreates the life and times of Swami Vivekananda, while his Chitre Durgeshnandini (1962) re-imagines Bankimchandra Chattopadhyay's novel Durgeshnandini in graphic novel techniques. But it was his Handa Bhoda (1962), Nonte Phonte (1969) and Shootki ar Mootki (1964) that revolutionized the comic genre in Bengal through the familiar trope of the ‘terrible twins’ at boarding school. This trope could be traced back to the German artist Wilhelm Bosch's Max and Moritz (1865) – an illustrated story in verse, which later found its way into the English world as The Katzenjammer Kids (1897) of Rudolph Dirks and Harold H. Knerr. The trope is also found in Hergè's Quick and Flupke (1930).

== Development of the genre ==
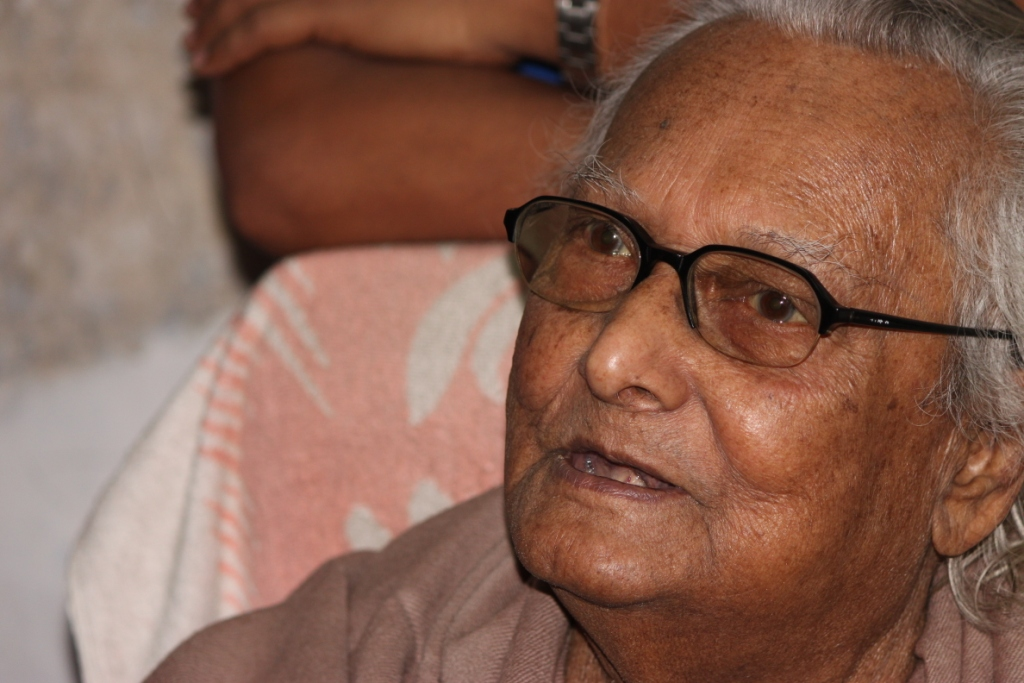
Narayan Debnath

When the Bangladesh War of Liberation flared up, he was asked by the editors and publishers to add an aura of invincibility. He made Bantul a superhero able to take on tanks, aircraft, and missiles. Bullets began to bounce off of him. Bantul was still drawn by Debnath for Shuktara.

He gave birth to eponymous cartoon characters, Nonte and Phonte in 1969, and since then, stories revolve around them, have been regularly published in “Kishor Bharati”.

He started his freelance artist career in 1950 at Shuktara magazine. He was a renowned illustrator during his time and held the record for highest number of illustrations in Bengal. His continuous work (over 42 years) on Tarzan stories, and Bengali translation of foreign novels are among his works.

== Personal life and death ==
Narayan Debnath was admitted to a hospital on 24 December and died of heart-related ailments on 18 January 2022 in Kolkata, at the age of 96.

== Selected creations (Chronological List) ==
- Rabi-Chhabi also spelled as Rabi Chobi [রবি-ছবি] (Comics; First published in 1961; republished in 2010)
- Rajar Raja/Chhabite Vivekananda [রাজার রাজা/ছবিতে বিবেকানন্দ] (Comics; First published in 1962)
- Chitre Durgeshnandini [চিত্রে দুর্গেশনন্দিনী] (Graphic novel; First published in 1962)
- Handa Bhonda, also referred to as Hada Bhoda, Handa-Bhonda and Hada-Bhoda [হাঁদা-ভোঁদা] (First published in 1962)
- Sutki-Mutki [শুটকি-মুটকি] (First published in 1964)
- Chhatrapati Shivaji [ছত্রপতি শিবাজী] (Comics; Published from 1964 to 1965)
- Batul The Great, also referred to as Bantul The Great [বাঁটুল দি গ্রেট] (First published in 1965)
- Hirer Tayra [হীরের টায়রা] (First published in 1965)
- Nonte Phonte, also spelled as Nonte Fonte, Nonte-Phonte, and Nonte-Fonte [নন্টে-ফন্টে] (First published in 1969)
- Patolchand The Magician [পটলচাঁদ দি ম্যাজিশিয়ান] (First published in 1969)
- Black Diamond Indrajit Roy also referred to as Indrajit Roy Bonam Black Diamond [ব্ল্যাক ডায়মন্ড ইন্দ্রজিৎ রায়/ইন্দ্রজিৎ রায় বনাম ব্ল্যাক ডায়মন্ড] (Graphic novel; First published in 1970)
- Rahasyamoy Abhijatri [রহস্যময় অভিযাত্রী] (Published in 1972)
- Bigyapanoner Comics [বিজ্ঞাপনের কমিকস] (Comics made for advertising Benzytol soap, written by Adrish Bardhan; Published from 1973 to 1974)
- Itihase Dwairath [ইতিহাসে দ্বৈরথ] (Comics; First published in 1974)
- Detective Koushik Roy also referred to as Goyenda Koushik [ডিটেকটিভ কৌশিক রায়/গোয়েন্দা কৌশিক] (First published in 1975)
- Bahadur Beral [বাহাদুর বেড়াল] (First published in 1982)
- Daanpite Khandu Aar Tar Chemical Dadu [ডানপিটে খাঁদু আর তার কেমিক্যাল দাদু] (First published in 1983)
- Petuk Master Batuklal [পেটুক মাস্টার বটুকলাল] (First published in 1984)
- Mahakasher Ajab Deshe [মহাকাশের আজব দেশে] (Published in 1994)
- Jataker Golpo [জাতকের গল্প] (Comics based on Jataka Tales; Published in 1994)
- Gobindor Goyendagiri [গোবিন্দর গোয়েন্দাগিরি] (Short story; First published in 2002)
- Ek Projapotir Mrityu [এক প্রজাপতির মৃত্যু] (Short Story; First published in 2012)
- Koutuhaler Bipod [কৌতূহলের বিপদ] (Short Story)
- Smritir Du'Chaar Pata [স্মৃতির দু'চার পাতা] (Unfinished Autobiography)
- Hasir Atom Bomb [হাসির অ্যাটম বোম]
- ' ' Jemon Kormo Temoni Fol [যেমন কর্ম তেমনি ফল ]
- Nandir Fandi [নন্দীর ফন্দী]

== Popularity ==
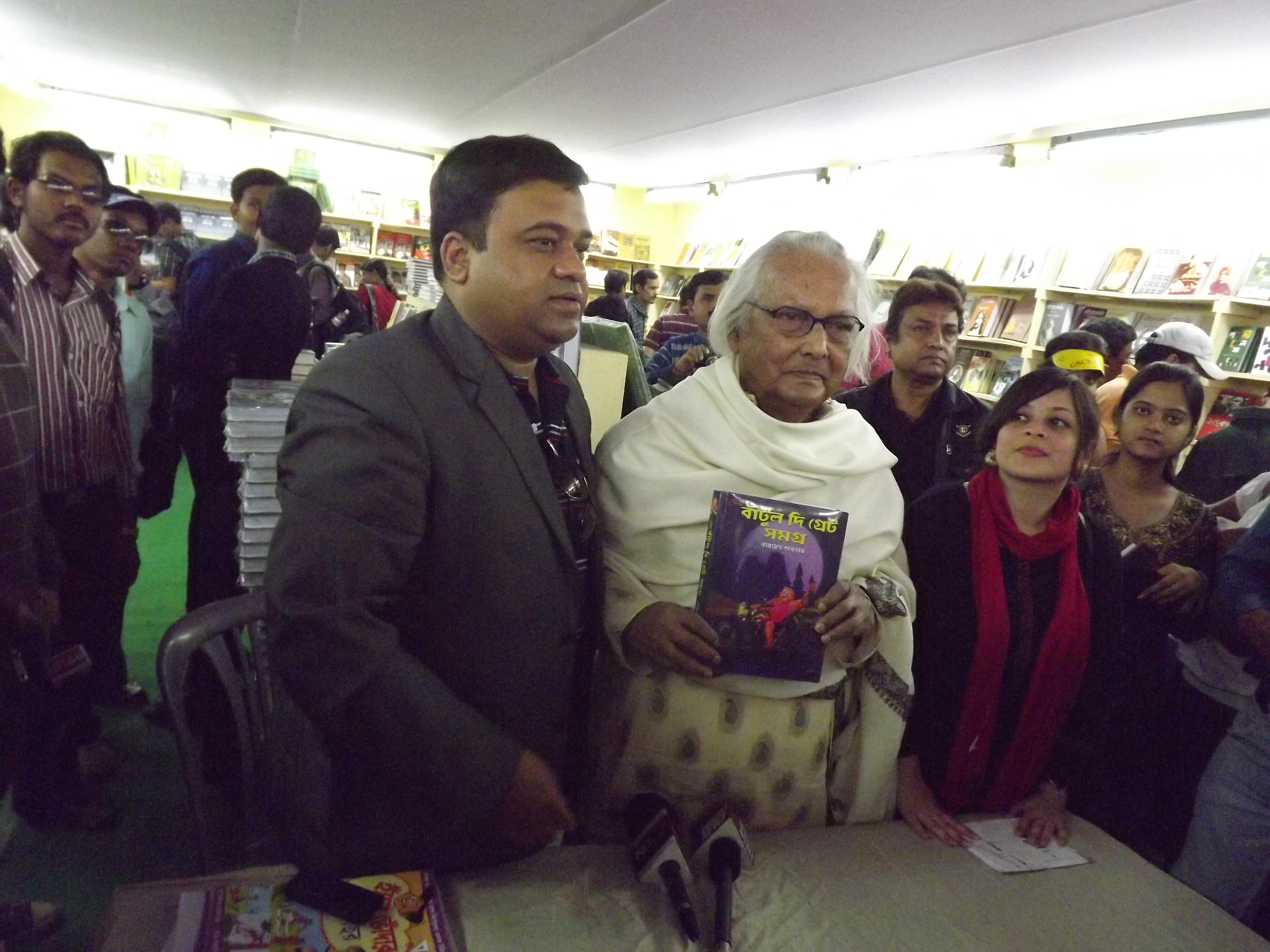
Releasing his own book at the Kolkata International Book Fair 2014

Collections of Debnath's comics have been published serially in Shuktara and Kishor Bharati and irregularly in Kishor Mon, Chotoder Asar, Pakhkhiraj etc. His comic books featuring 'Handa Bhonda', 'Batul the Great' and 'Nonte Phonte' have been published since the early 1980s. Since the late 1990s, the Nonte Phonte comics have been anthologised and published in softcover format. From 2003 onwards, the earlier comics have been re-inked and published in full-color. Recently, Debnath gave permission for an animated film based on the characters from 'Batul The Great', 'Handa Bhonda' and 'Nonte Phonte', and these provide access to the original stories to a whole new generation of children.

Debnath's style incorporating characters speaking in the typical language of Bengali adda (the quintessential Bengali gossip sessions lasting hours) and hundreds of nonstandard, yet most commonly used expletives in daily life like "Uls" (describing reaction to a delicious food) or "Aoofs", "Yiofs", "Arghhh"(similar to ouch). Subtle punning is also aplenty in his comics but the main source of comedy is slapstick.

Though his comic characters have immense popularity, Narayan Debnath himself has rather lived reclusively, distancing himself from publicity and media.

== Television ==
Most of Narayan Debnath's work has been adapted for Bengali television. Nonte Phonte and Bantul the Great are animated shows today, while a television series called Handa Bhonda was briefly on air.

== Awards and recognition ==
1. Padma Shri, awarded by Government of India on 26 January 2021 (Note: He was 95 at that time and was needed to be explained several times before fully comprehending that he indeed was chosen to receive the award. His first reaction was, "Finally, have they chosen me?")
2. Sahitya Akademi Award, 2013
3. Banga Bibhushan, awarded by Government of West Bengal in 2013

== See also ==
- Sufi, Indian cartoonist
