= Dariush Ramezani =

Cartoonist

- Born: March 21, 1976 (age 50) Rasht, Iran
- Area: Cartoonist
- Pseudonym: Dariush
- Notable works: Dear Deer

Dariush Ramezani (Persian: داریوش رمضانی; born 1976 in Rasht) He received his B.S. in Civil Engineering degree from Gilan University in Rasht in 2000. He began drawing cartoons in 1997 as a professional cartoonist. His cartoons and comic strips are published in some newspapers and magazines in Iran. He has published cartoon books and won international and national contest prizes.

== Prizes and honors ==
- First prize in International cartoon contest TURHAN SELCUK (Turkey, 2011)
- Honor prize in International cartoon contest PIRACICABA (Brazil, 2011)
- Honor prize in International cartoon contest CANADIAN BANANA (Montreal, Canada, 2010)
- First prize in International cartoon contest (Tabriz, Iran, 2008)
- First prize in UMO cartoon contest (India, 2007)
- Grand prize in EUROHUMOUR (Italy.2006)
- winning prize in international Web Cartoon (China, 2006)
- winning prize in International cartoon contest (Syria, 2006)
- Honor prize in International cartoon contest (Tehran, Iran, 2004)
- Honor prize in International cartoon contest (Tabriz, Iran, 2003)
- First prize in scholar cartoon contest (Iran, 1998)
- Special overseas junior prize in International Cartoon Contest YUMIURI (Japan, 1994)

== Books ==
- Don’t Wake Me Up, Please! in 2005.
- The Lonely Little Ant in 2005.
- The Deer in 2007.
- Sometimes... in 2008.

== Exhibitions ==
- More than 15 solo and group exhibitions in Iran.
