= Benita Epstein =

American cartoonist

Benita L. Epstein is a prolific gag cartoonist for magazines, greeting cards, websites and newspapers. She was a regular contributor to the comic strip Six Chix, distributed by King Features Syndicate.

Before becoming a cartoonist, Epstein earned a Bachelors and a Masters in Entomology. In addition to her studies of autism, lung surfactant, photosynthesis, purine metabolism and yellow-fever mosquitoes, she assisted her husband in ecological field research at islands around the world.

== Cartoons ==
As a cartoonist, she has focused on women, relationships, business, medicine, science, the travel industry, Jewish lifestyle, holidays, professors and education. Her cartoons have been published in hundreds of publications, including Barron's, Better Homes and Gardens, Harvard Business Review, The New Yorker, Reader's Digest, USA Weekend and The Wall Street Journal. For Creators Syndicate, she created the daily comics feature Drawing a Crowd, which ran from January 2002 to June 2003. In 2006, she explained her working process:

I start out feeding my brain with newspapers, books, TV news, Internet news, listening to conversations. Then I write, usually in the morning. Gags comes out of nowhere. Even if it's silly or stupid or unusable, I write it down. I can edit it later. I let the writing simmer. After a day, a week, sometimes years, I go back, fix the writing and pick out some gags to draw. Occasionally I have brainstormed via email with other cartoonists. It works great, and I can't ever remember when either of us wanted the other one's ideas; so we never really stepped on each other's toes... I make a primitive, rough outline of the people, main characters, in a basic setting on crummy copy paper with a regular pencil. Then I put a nice piece of smooth HP laser paper over the sketch and ink over it on a light table. For crowd, bar, vegetation, beach and laboratory scenes, I draw directly on the finished paper with no sketches because I draw fast, and background scenes are loosely lined. I use Pigma pens and a brush, sometimes a Sharpie or a black calligraphy pen. Then I scan the drawings into Photoshop. If a company wants an original, I ink on good watercolor paper and add a gray wash or watercolor. But in Photoshop I shade/color the drawing using a Wacom tablet. If I'm on vacation, I can draw on tracing paper and save that to scan later, or photocopy the cartoons, send by mail to various companies, then scan them when I get home. I like to have every single cartoon scanned, so I can pull them up at a moment's notice and either print hard copies or send PDFs. I've been sending stuff via PDF for years worldwide, and I think it's given me an edge over a lot of cartoonists who concentrate on the regular major markets here in the U.S.

In 2009, she told interviewer Scott Nickel, "I have the grapheme form of synesthesia where letters and numbers are perceived as colors. Others with this are the physicist Richard Feynman, Russian writer Vladimir Nabokov."

Epstein has given drawing demonstrations to adult developmentally disabled and other handicapped students. She lives in Redding, California with her husband, stepson and their pug, Harley.

== Awards ==
The National Cartoonists Society nominated Epstein four times for Best Magazine Gag Cartoonist and twice for Best Greeting Card Cartoonist.

== Bibliography ==
- Epstein, Benita. Interlibrary Loan Sharks and Seedy Roms: Cartoons from Libraryland (McFarland, 1997)
- Epstein, Benita. Suture Self: Cartoons for Doctors and Patients (McFarland, 1999)
- Epstein, Benita. Science of Little Round Things: Cartoons about Scientists (McFarland, 2000)
- Donnelly, Lisa. Funny Ladies: The New Yorker's Greatest Women Cartoonists and Their Cartoons (Prometheus, 2005)
