= George William Houghton =

Group Captain George William Houghton OBE (9 September 1905 – October 1993) was a prolific British golf writer and cartoonist. He was born in Perth, Scotland.

== Life and works ==
Houghton served as an RAF officer in the Western Desert in World War II and later recounted his experiences in They Flew Through Sand (1943).

During the 1950s and 1960s, he published over 20 humorous books on golf. His books were trendy and were said to be on every public library shelf in Australia. In 1974, sales of his golf humor books reached 600,000 copies.

His "Golf Addict" series with titles such as Golf Addict Visits the USA (1955), Golf Addict Invades Wales (1969), and Golf Addict in Gaucho Land (1970) describe his golfing experiences and encounters in the British Isles, Sweden, Japan, China, Russia, South America, and the United States. He illustrated his books with his cartoons.

Comedian Bob Hope contributed an introduction to his cartoon collection Addict in Bunkerland, as did Scottish golfer Ronnie Shade to his collection Golf Addicts Galore.

One reviewer said of him: "George Houghton's "Addict" is the "little man" of golf who likes to think himself and is the backbone of the game. Golf cuts us all down to size, and we realise that, on the links at any rate, we are all little men . . . "

Houghton collaborated with Scotland's famous lady golfer, Jessie Valentine, to write a book with tips for amateurs. Better Golf – Definitely! (1967).

He wrote one junior novel, Between the Red Lines (1949). Based on fact, it is the lively and often humorous story of a father and son who take a three-week walking holiday off the beaten track in England.

Based on his own medical experience, he also wrote The Penny Spenders (1966), a book on prostate diseases.

== Selected anthologies ==
- Golf With a Whippy Shaft: The Best of George Houghton. A.S. Barnes, 1971 ISBN 0-498-06936-2 ISBN 9780498069369
- The Best of George Houghton. London, Sean Arnold, 1991 ISBN 0-9516078-2-0
