= Dear Dumb Diary =

Series of children's novels by Jim Benton

- Year One; Let's Pretend This Never Happened; My Pants Are Haunted! Am I the Princess or the Frog? Never Do Anything, Ever; Can Adults Become Human? The Problem With Here Is That It's Where I'm From; Never Underestimate Your Dumbness; It's Not My Fault I Know Everything; That's What Friends Aren't For; The Worst Things In Life Are Also Free; Okay, So Maybe I Do Have Superpowers; Me! (Just Like You, Only Better); Year Two; School. Hasn't This Gone on Long Enough? The Super-Nice Are Super-Annoying; Nobody's Perfect. I'm As Close As It Gets; What I Don't Know Might Hurt Me; You Can Bet on That; Live Each Day to the Dumbest; Dumbness is a Dish Best Served Cold
- Author: Jim Benton
- Country: United States
- Language: English
- Genre: Children's literature
- Publisher: Scholastic Inc.
- Published: 2004 - 2016
- Media type: Paperback

Dear Dumb Diary is a series of children's novels by Jim Benton. Each book is written in the first person view of a middle school girl named Jamie Kelly. The series is published by Scholastic in English and Random House in Korean. Film rights to the series have been optioned by the Gotham Group.

The series follows the adventures and awkward incidents of Jamie Kelly at Mackerel Middle School with her friends Isabella and Angeline. Her family life and school life are heavily intertwined, with her Aunt Carol joining the school staff and marrying the assistant principal, thus making most of the school staff family friends.

== Characters ==
=== Main ===
- Jamie Kelly is an awkward, easily embarrassed middle school girl who owns the diary and narrates the stories. She is passionate about art and glitter and is generally thought of as weird or eccentric. She loves koalas and has coulrophobia. Jamie typically has a sarcastic nature and enjoys teasing and deriding those around her in her diary. While most of this is lighthearted, she particularly enjoys putting down her favorite targets including adults (which she even speculated are not human at one point) and authority figures such as her teachers and school staff, her friend Angeline, the lunchroom monitor Ms. Bruntford, the bully Pinsetti, her dog Stinker, other students, clowns, and on occasion her best friend Isabella, among many others. She is part of the Student Awareness Council and the Cuisine Club. Named after Jim Benton, whose full name is James Kelly Benton. She is portrayed by Emily Alyn Lind in the film adaptation.
- Isabella Vinchella is Jamie's mean and hotheaded best friend who is often manipulative, foul-tempered, prone to intimidation tactics, and even outright unpleasant, as a result of having grown up around two older brothers who enjoy bullying and belittling her. Regardless of these traits, Jamie insists on being her friend throughout everything, even admiring her for her violence as they became friends when Isabella beat up a boy for making fun of her name, and Jamie complimented her by comparing her to a "dangerous little mousetrap that you shouldn't put your fingers in". She is a master of faking injuries to frame her two mean older brothers for inflicting them. She is part of the Video Game Club. She is portrayed by Mary-Charles Jones in the film.
- Angeline is a beautiful and popular girl who, despite seeming to embody the mean popular girl stereotype in earlier books where Jamie sees her as more of an enemy, is actually very nice and loves donating to charities. She constantly strives to be seen as more than just beautiful and popular. She considers herself a very good friend of Jamie and her Aunt Carol and Uncle Assistant Principal Devon, and has helped them multiple times, despite Jamie believing she is plotting against her. In Am I The Princess Or The Frog? she is revealed to be Jamie's kindergarten friend known as "Annie" due to a speech impediment. Her last name is unknown, but her father's name is known to be Angelo. She is head of the Student Awareness Council. She is portrayed by Sterling Griffith in the film.

When writing about why she hates Angeline, Jamie often describes, in elaborate detail, Angeline's kindness, beauty (particularly her self-styled blonde hair), intelligence, and other positive qualities. Because of this, the seemingly superficial nature of their shared crush on Hudson, and other factors, some readers have interpreted Jamie as a closeted lesbian with a tsundere crush on Angeline. Jim Benton stated:

Your work can land in ways you can't predict. I always tried to write Jamie as a person who was forever discovering new things about herself and the people around her-and she was very often wrong at first. I'm certain that Jamie has all sorts of discoveries ahead of her.

=== Major ===
- Stinker is Jamie's old and overweight male beagle, known for farting (hence the name) who despite Jamie believing him to be ugly and stinky, and often playing pranks on him, is very much well-loved. Along with Pinsetti, he is the source of most of the gross-out humor in the books. He is believed to have died in the book Dear Dumb Diary Deluxe: Dumbness Is A Dish Best Served Cold after swallowing Jamie's late grandmother's bracelet, but a miracle surgery funded by Jamie, Isabella and Angeline's partnership with the salad dressing company saves his life. He is portrayed by a Jack Russell Terrier in the film.
- Aunt Carol is Jamie's beautiful aunt who works as a secretary in Mackerel Middle School and is married to Uncle Assistant Principal Devon. While they were still dating, the identity of Devon as Aunt Carol's boyfriend was kept a secret, and Jamie kept force-feeding Stinker beans as an excuse for her to leave her room because of the smell of his farts, so she can eavesdrop on her mother and Aunt Carol's conversations. This does not succeed, and Stinker doesn't fart until the day of Carol and Devon's wedding at Jamie's house causing everyone to evacuate due to nearly a month's worth of gas from beans stewing in his belly. In the book The Problem With Here Is That It's Where I'm From, Isabella successfully tricks Aunt Carol into believing long white wedding dresses are no longer in style and that wooden clogs and brown poofy dresses are the latest fashion among young brides of Hollywood, but after Jamie and Isabella make a big show out of fake-falling down the stairs in the clogs, Carol ends up buying them new shoes. The poofy dresses were also stolen by Devon before the wedding. Aunt Carol is portrayed by Laura Bell Bundy in the film.
- Uncle Assistant Principal Dan Devon is Jamie's uncle and assistant principal of Mackerel Middle School, who is also Angeline's uncle on her mother's side, making Angeline Jamie's cousin-in-law. Jamie was disgusted by the marriage making her somehow related to Angeline and on occasion had tried to separate them. Due to being Jamie's uncle, he serves as Jamie's connection to the school when he wants her, Isabella and Angeline to plan out events. He is portrayed by James Waterston in the film.
- Jamie's mother is known for her horrible cooking which she attempts to force onto her daughter and husband, nevertheless she makes decent hors d'ouvres. In the book You Can Bet On That she is also known for making horrible clothes which she forces onto her daughter, husband and Isabella, described as looking like "monkey vomit". Aside from her gross cooking and fashion sense she is a decent person. Her sister who likes annoying her is Aunt Carol. She is portrayed by Maddie Corman in the film.
- Jamie's father is generally a gross person as well as boring (at least according to Jamie). He can never get names right and constantly calls Stinker "Jamie" and vice versa. He also calls Isabella "Isadora" and Angeline "Angela" despite being corrected multiple times. He is portrayed by Jeffrey Hanson in the film.
- Stinkette is one of a litter of four puppies whose parents are Stinker and Angeline's dog Stickybuns. Jamie adopts her due to her resemblance and attachment to her father.
- Hudson Rivers is a boy who both Jamie and Angeline have a crush on despite Hudson being said to be the "eighth cutest boy in the school". He is shown as having crushes on both Jamie and Angeline, but neither of them as big as his crush on Isabella, who he asks out to have tacos with him after the school dance in Never Underestimate Your Own Dumbness, but she tells him she couldn't come as she was being punished for fake-falling down the stairs. He asks out Jamie and Angeline, but they ultimately decline his offer, believing that he rejected Isabella when he told them she couldn't come. He is portrayed by David Mazouz in the film.
- Mike Pinsetti or Antonio Michael Pinsetti, more frequently known simply as Pinsetti, is an unpleasant bully character, described as a "human sack of turds", who likes making poorly-thought-up nicknames for every student in the school. He is somewhat afraid of Angeline, who punched him when he called her "big weird thing", as was revealed in the book Dear Dumb Diary Deluxe: Dumbness Is A Dish Best Served Cold. He has a crush on Jamie which she justifiably rejects. Generally known for disgusting habits and poor hygiene, after meeting the substitute lunchroom monitor Sebastian Bruntford in The Super-Nice Are Super-Annoying, he attempts to mend his reputation by becoming well-mannered and polite, wearing ties and suggesting a fancy dance party. He is portrayed by Carson Oliver in the film.
- Colette is a girl from Wodehouse Middle School who was constantly bullied due to various incidents (in particular one where she laughed so hard while eating spaghetti that it shot out of her nose and the school nurses tried to see if it was a vein or intestine while the "whole world of her school" watched) and as result she has no friends. As revenge she placed rotting cat food in her school's ventilation causing the school to be shut down temporarily. During that period, she is transferred to Mackerel Middle School where she befriends Isabella, Jamie and Angeline, while the school handed out ballots so students could vote for each other in categories such as prettiest, most artistic, funniest etc. Colette seems to be highly competitive with Angeline who is only ever voted Prettiest each year, using makeup to make herself even more beautiful so as to be voted for Prettiest in order to save her reputation, resulting in Angeline writing "VOTE JAMIE FOR PRETTIEST" on the bathroom walls to have Jamie steal votes so Angeline can stay as Prettiest as she "wasn't about to lose her one lame category". After discovering Colette's tragic backstory, Isabella persuades Colette, Angeline and Jamie to agree to her plan, presumably involving switching the ballots for Colette's title of Most Clever into Prettiest, leading to Colette winning the vote and saving her reputation.
- Miss Bruntford is the school's cafeteria monitor who forces everyone to eat the school's disgusting meatloaf on Thursdays. She is very accident prone due to her obesity combined with her tiny high-heeled shoes. Jamie often jokes about her fatness, even stating she could have her own planetary orbit. In the book Am I The Princess or the Frog? she eats her own meatloaf and faints while yelling, "Call 911!" While Bruntford recovers, Jamie's mother is called on to be the acting cafeteria monitor but her meatloaf is far worse, and this is believed to be a set-up by Bruntford to make her own meatloaf look better by comparison. She becomes Isabella's co-conspirator in the attempt to stop Ms. Anderson from coming to Devon and Carol's engagement announcement party. In The Super-Nice Are Super-Annoying she is revealed to be rather wealthy, living in a lavishly decorated mansion with her son Sebastian. Her now-deceased husband was the previous cafeteria monitor. In Nobody's Perfect. I'm As Close As It Gets, it is revealed that the school had been buying cheap meatloaf to save money for high-quality ground coffee at the teachers' lounge, this being a conspiracy orchestrated by Bruntford and science teacher Mrs. Curie. When Jamie reveals to the whole school staff how terrible the meatloaf is, Thursday is no longer meatloaf day, but rather "surprise day", where Bruntford goes around asking for feedback on her new improvised food (though it is no less cheap and poorly-thought-out). She is portrayed by Lea DeLaria in the film.
- Sebastian Bruntford is Miss Bruntford's son who takes over her cafeteria monitor duties in The Super-Nice Are Super-Annoying. He is a handsome and polite young man who Jamie and Isabella attempt to romance when he talks with them and Angeline during lunch, using their school assignment about manners as an excuse to charm him. In contrast, Angeline deliberately acts mean when Sebastian is around, due to her not wanting to be seen as merely a "delicate and well mannered creature of grace" (a phrase that Sebastian used to refer to a popular actress before Jamie used it to refer to herself in an attempt to flirt with him). Despite attempting to romance him for his wealth, Isabella abandons Sebastian upon discovering that if she married him, she would become Miss Bruntford's daughter in law.
- Miss Valerie Anderson is Jamie's favorite teacher who becomes the main antagonist of Can Adults Become Human? She is the art teacher who is in love with Uncle Assistant Principal Devon and despises Aunt Carol. Before finding out Devon is engaged to Carol, she presents the students with an assignment to make an anonymous valentine card, of which Jamie's card ends up being used by Anderson to ask Devon out to lunch, which he throws in the trash. Enraged by this outcome, Anderson attempts to ruin Devon and Carol's engagement announcement party, but Bruntford and Isabella, feeling sorry for Aunt Carol, pop her car tires before she can arrive. Furthermore, Angeline appears asking to help Anderson replace her tire but then lies about losing the nuts, implying she too is part of the conspiracy. Anderson arrives via tow truck and seems to be on surprisingly good terms with Devon and Carol, seemingly having fallen in love with the tow truck driver. In Nobody's Perfect. I'm As Close As It Gets, she is shown teaching the Cuisine Club the value of money and about food budgeting. When Bruntford and Curie's meatloaf conspiracy is unveiled, Anderson suggests a number of alternatives to the meatloaf that students would enjoy better while costing just as much. She is portrayed by Jacque Gray in the film, where her name is Holly Anderson.
- Margaret Parker is a nerdy, unpopular girl with a habit of pencil-chewing. In the book My Pants Are Haunted she is given a makeover by Jamie and Isabella, including wearing a pair of high-end BellAzure jeans, and becomes unexpectedly more popular than Jamie, Angeline and Isabella. This, together with an incident where the jeans made a fart noise while Jamie wore them in front of Hudson, led Isabella and Jamie to believe the pants were demonically possessed, hence the book title. It is revealed that the reason for Margaret's popularity wasn't because of the jeans, but because of a bottle of Isabella's perfume concoction snuck into Margaret's bag by another girl named Sally Winthorpe so she could test its effects and hopefully use the perfume to get with Hudson.
- Sally Winthorpe is Margaret's friend who is known as one of the smartest kids in school. She is revealed to have orchestrated the events of My Pants Are Haunted, placing Isabella's perfume sample "superfragrance" in Margaret's bag to boost her popularity in order to test its effects to see if it would work with Hudson Rivers, who she had a crush on, and her attempt succeeded.
- T.U.K.W.N.I.F., short for "That Ugly Kid Whose Name I Forget", is Jamie's nickname for a shy, introverted unpopular boy in her school who she considers the absolute pinnacle of hideousness, also called "That One Kid". In the book That's What Friends Aren't For, he plays the piano with Jamie's art piece attached to its front during the talent show. When Jamie's mother calls him "Tuck or Tuckster", Jamie suspects that his name is indeed "Tukwnif", but it is revealed to actually be "Tucker".
- Emmily or Emily is a dim-witted but friendly and innocent girl who wins Jamie's "best friend auditions" designed to keep Angeline from stealing Isabella's attention from Jamie. She spells her name with two M's because she loves M&M's, not because of the M markings on the chocolates but because of the "mmm" sound she makes while eating them.
- Dicky Flartsnutt is a boy who is part of the Student Council Awareness club along with Jamie, Isabella and Angeline. Despite his awkwardness and nerdy appearance, myriad allergies and lack of expertise in any school subjects, he remains immune to any and all bullying and retains his optimism due to his loving and caring family. He first appears in What I Don't Know Might Hurt Me during the time of year when all clubs have their "membership drives" where they try to recruit more members and the school gives prize money to the club with the most new members, an event deemed as useless by Jamie but which Angeline shows more passion in. The Cuisine Club, Video Game Club and the Student Awareness Council all end up with a tie, leaving only Dicky behind to join either club and break the tie. Throughout the book Jamie tries to get him to join the Cuisine Club, Isabella tries to get him to join the Video Game Club and Angeline tries to get him to join the Student Awareness Council, the lattermost of which Dicky actually joins.
- Isabella's two older brothers are described as "enemies who live in her house", they often like to bully and harass her, and in turn are framed for Isabella's injuries that she fakes. Sometimes as payback for their bullying, Isabella likes playing cruel pranks on them, such as in Can Adults Become Human? where when one of her brothers stole a chocolate bar she had been saving, she snuck into his bedroom while he slept that night, placed an earthworm in his mouth and taped it shut. In School. Hasn't This Gone Long Enough? it is revealed that one of the brothers was born with a vestigial tail, which was removed and which he keeps in a jar.

=== Minor ===
- Mr. VanDoy is Jamie's social studies teacher during the Year 1 books who seemingly never smiles, but when Stinker finally farts after three weeks of built-up gas from being forcefed beans in Jamie's failed attempt to eavesdrop, causing everyone at Devon and Carol's engagement announcement party to evacuate, VanDoy is the first to laugh about it. He is portrayed by Tom Markus in the film.
- Mr. Evans is Jamie's English teacher during the Year 1 books. He is bald and whenever he gets irritated, a throbbing blue vein appears across his forehead.
- Mr. Henzy is Jamie's Math teacher during the Year 2 books.
- Mrs. Palmer is Jamie's Science teacher during the first half of the Year 1 books. She is known for swapping students who irritate her in paired assignment groups.
- Mrs. Maple is Jamie's Science teacher during the second half of the Year 1 books, alias The Toe due to both her middle toes being much longer than the rest of her toes to the point that they extend out of her shoes.
- Ms. Curie is Jamie's Science teacher during the Year 2 books. In Nobody's Perfect. I'm As Close As It Gets she teaches a class about defense mechanisms used by animals to avoid predators, but appears increasingly anxious and refuses to answer when Jamie asks why students still eat the meatloaf even if it looks and tastes horrible. At the end of the book it is revealed the meatloaf is so horrible because it is cheap, to save money for the school lounge's expensive coffee, and Curie funded the meatloaf. Anderson steps in to help Curie substitute the meatloaf with better foods of the same price.
- Mrs. Avon is Jamie's English teacher during the Year 2 books with large, visible pink gums.
- Angeline's mother is an unnamed mother of Angeline and a sister of uncle Assistant Principal Devon. She is described as being as bad at hair as Jamie's mother is at cooking and fashion. She attempted to style her daughter's hair, resulting in a bizarre-looking hairstyle that led to constant bullying during kindergarten, with Jamie being her only friend. Angeline had to learn extensively how to style her own hair after that, inventing such techniques as "zone-shampooing" (applying different scented shampoos to areas of her hair).
- Mr. Algernon Smith is Jamie's social studies teacher during the year 2 books whose black hair is blatantly a wig barely covering his actual grey hair, causing Jamie to constantly remark "don't look at it, don't look at it!". Combined with the fact that the name "Smith" sounds fake, this leads Jamie to believe that his identity is false (though it is shown that Smith is his actual name). In Live Each Day To The Dumbest it is revealed that he was Jamie's grandfather's main rival in the pursuit of her grandmother-to-be in middle school. As an act of revenge and as one last tribute to Jamie's late grandmother, Isabella kicks Smith in the groin. Smith also explains that he wears the wig to keep in touch with the old days, and that he doesn't expect it to fool anyone.
- Vicki Vonder is a plain-looking girl who has a habit of copying other students, especially Angeline.
- F.A.T.A.A.L.D., short for "Frustrated And Tired And A Little Disgusted", is Jamie's favorite band who she attempts to make a poster for the school's in the book Me! (Just Like You, Only Better). F.A.T.A.A.L.D. is not the band's real name, and they actually pronounce their name as a long, deep sigh, described eponymously as "frustrated and tired and a little disgusted". They made an album called "Butter" after their song "Butter Compared To You Is Margarine". She ends up moving on them from after Jamie writes the words "FATAALD Butter" on her arm, but it is covered by her sleeve to spell "FAT Butt", making her the subject of ridicule from other students. FATAALD then becomes popular among the students and many of Jamie's classmates attempt to use them as their art project, not knowing that Jamie had moved onto another singer named Jared Jay Fire. Jamie eventually returned to liking the band after trying to listen to a bunch of other singers and bands to stop people from copying her.
- Jared Jay Fire is a singer who Jamie started to listen to after she moved on from FATAALD, but when she found out her classmates started talking about him and using him as the theme for their music-themed school art project, she realized they were trying to copy her.
- Verge Aplo is a singer who Jamie's mom used to like when she was Jamie's age. After moving on from Jared Jay Fire, Jamie Kelly pretended to like his music in an attempt to prove her point about everyone trying to copy her. Soon enough, her classmates start using him as the theme for their art project, believing lies Jamie told about him. Miss Bruntford plays his songs in the cafeteria and Jamie expresses distaste for them. It is then revealed that Verge has been dead for several years and in Jamie's words "nobody was polite enough to stop playing his songs as though he was still alive".
- The Whisker Brothers is a band who Jamie started to listen to after moving on from Verge Aplo, which she planned to keep a secret from her classmates before the art project had been completed so they wouldn't have time to change the art project theme from Verge Aplo. When she reveals the Whisker Brothers poster she created when the art project was due, the Whisker Brothers became famous around school, until Jamie revealed she had secretly hidden a FATAALD poster beneath the Whisker Brothers poster. It was revealed that the reason this whole series of events started was that Isabella was copying Emmily, who was copying Vicki, who was copying Angeline who copied Jamie on purpose to help her favorite bands become a trend as she thought Jamie would appreciate being a trendsetter.
- Butch Dirggen is a "big fat hairy ugly" boy (in Jamie's words) who enjoys bullying other students together with his two unnamed cohorts. While Pinsetti enjoys teasing students by calling them poorly-thought-up-nicknames, Butch tends to use intimidation tactics and put-downs to get his way. His favorite target is Dicky, nonetheless Dicky sees Butch as a friend due to being unable to distinguish niceness and meanness. Isabella goes through a phase where she becomes nicer for a while due to her brothers leaving the house for their live-in amusement park jobs, but this leads to her doing nothing to stop Butch's attacks on her, Jamie, Angeline and Dicky. Eventually when her brothers got fired and return home, Isabella returns to being mean. After Butch attempts to steal Dicky's food, Isabella finally breaks his wrist, leading to a huge confession of years' worth of bullying. His father scolds him and he ends up joining the video game club. Isabella decides to humiliate him further by bringing TVs and game consoles to the lobby and hangs up a sign that reads "you can't beat Butch". With his wrist patched up and with the games being unfamiliar to him, Butch "couldn't beat anyone, not even Dicky".
- Prince Fuzzybutt, the Bubblegum Duchess and Dingledongle are Stinker and Stickybuns' children and Stinkette's siblings. Prince Fuzzybutt is adopted by Angeline, the Bubblegum Duchess is adopted by Isabella and Dingledongle is adopted by Aunt Carol.

== Reception ==
Critical reception for the series has been mixed, with Publishers Weekly writing that the lead character "makes the occasional funny observation, more often her stabs at humor miss their mark or are so protracted that the comic moment fizzles". A reviewer for The Indian Express compared My Pants are Haunted! to the Diary of a Wimpy Kid series, saying that fans of Wimpy Kid would like the series.

== Books ==
=== Year One ===
1. Let's Pretend This Never Happened (July 1, 2004)
2. My Pants Are Haunted! (October 1, 2004)
3. Am I the Princess or the Frog? (June 1, 2005)
4. Never Do Anything, Ever (November 1, 2005)
5. Can Adults Become Human? (May 1, 2006)
6. The Problem With Here Is That It's Where I'm From (July 1, 2007)
7. Never Underestimate Your Dumbness (March 1, 2008)
8. It's Not My Fault I Know Everything (January 1, 2009)
9. That's What Friends Aren't For (January 1, 2010)
10. The Worst Things In Life Are Also Free (June 1, 2010)
11. Okay, So Maybe I Do Have Superpowers (January 1, 2011)
12. Me! (Just Like You, Only Better) (June 1, 2011)

=== Year Two ===
1. School. Hasn't This Gone Long Enough? (January 1, 2012)
2. The Super-Nice Are Super-Annoying (June 1, 2012)
3. Nobody's Perfect. I'm As Close As It Gets (January 1, 2013)
4. What I Don't Know Might Hurt Me (June 25, 2013)
5. You Can Bet on That (May 27, 2014)
6. Live Each Day to the Dumbest (May 26, 2015)

=== Deluxe ===
1. Dumbness is a Dish Best Served Cold (June 28, 2016)

== Film adaptation ==
A film version of Dear Dumb Diary was filmed in Salt Lake City, Utah, starring Emily Alyn Lind as Jamie and Mary-Charles Jones as Jamie's best friend Isabella. The film premiered on Hallmark Channel on September 6, 2013.

== See also ==
- Adrian Mole
- Diary
- List of fictional diaries
- Dork Diaries
- Diary of a Wimpy Kid
- It's Happy Bunny
- Franny K. Stein
