= Dear Dumb Diary (film) =

2013 American TV movie

- Film poster
- Written by: Jim Benton; Kristin Hanggi
- Directed by: Kristin Hanggi
- Starring: Emily Alyn Lind; Mary-Charles Jones; David Mazouz; Sterling Griffith; James Waterston; Lea DeLaria; Maddie Corman; Laura Bell Bundy; Jeffrey Hanson; Tom Markus; Stella Pasternak
- Music by: Steven Argila
- Country of origin: United States
- Original language: English

Production
- Producers: Jim Bechtold; Sean Gesell; Don Schain; Brian Wells
- Editor: Dan Schalk
- Production companies: Zucker Productions; Walden Media; Triple D Productions

Original release
- Network: Hallmark Channel
- Release: September 6, 2013

Dear Dumb Diary is a Hallmark Channel television film based on the book series of the same name by Jim Benton. It stars Emily Alyn Lind as Jamie Kelly, a seventh-grader who documents her experiences at Mackerel Middle School in her diary, as well as Mary-Charles Jones as her best friend Isabella and Sterling Griffith as popular girl Angeline. The film first aired on the Hallmark Channel on September 6, 2013.

== Plot ==
Jamie Kelly is a student at Mackerel Middle School. Her closest relationships include her best friend Isabella, her 'nemesis' Angeline and her love interest Hudson Rivers. Upon finding out that art classes are being revoked due to budget cuts, she inadvertently signs up for the Jump-A-Thon, which Angeline is also participating in. Jamie and Isabella go door-to-door asking for donations, with Isabella also getting donations for a charity called the "Juvenile Optometry Federation" that provides eyeglasses to poor children in need. Meanwhile, her Aunt Carol applies for a job as a secretary after Jamie accidentally injures an older secretary in Assistant Principal Devon's office.

Aunt Carol starts dating and Jamie tries to figure out who this mysterious date is. Meanwhile, Angeline begins to spend more time around Jamie, although Jamie suspects she has an ulterior motive. Jamie conspires to steal Angeline's permanent record in an attempt to find things she can use to ruin Angeline's reputation. A few days prior to the Jump-A-Thon, Jamie finds out that Isabella lied about the "Juvenile Optometry Federation" and used the money to buy herself some contact lenses, which turn out to be faulty. Meanwhile, Jamie's diary is misplaced and found by the other students, who ridicule her for the things she has written. Humiliated, Jamie refuses to return to school and almost bails on the Jump-A-Thon, but decides to attend after some encouraging words from Carol. At the Jump-A-Thon, Jamie learns that Angeline, despite all the sponsors she has received for the Jump-A-Thon, cannot do jump-rope on her own. Against her own preferences, she decides to help Angeline with the aid of Isabella, successfully saving the school's art program. She later learns that Angeline had protected Jamie by claiming that the lost diary belonged to her "cousin Jenny" who goes to a different school.

Jamie's family hosts a gathering at her house, with several teachers and staff members in attendance. At this party, she learns that the mystery boyfriend of Carol is her school's assistant principal, Dan Devon. She also learns that Dan is Angeline's uncle and that he and Carol are engaged, making Angeline and Jamie second cousins. Isabella later starts up her own charity, turning the Juvenile Optometry Foundation into a reality. The film ends with Jamie concluding that everyone has some form of "inner beauty", though much to her chagrin, Angeline calls her to proclaim that Hudson is going to be her date to Carol and Dan's wedding.

== Cast ==
- Emily Alyn Lind as Jamie Kelly
  - Katy Jensen as Adult Jamie
- Laura Bell Bundy as Aunt Carol
- Mary-Charles Jones as Isabella Vinchella
- David Mazouz as Hudson Rivers
- Sterling Griffith as Angeline
- James Waterston as Assistant Principal Dan Devon
- Lea DeLaria as Ms. Bruntford
- Maddie Corman as Mrs. Kelly
- Carson Oliver as Mike Pinsetti
- Jacque Gray as Miss Anderson
- Jeffrey Hanson as Mr. Kelly
- Tom Markus as Mr Vandoy
- Duane Stephens as Coach Dover

== Production ==
A film adaptation of Dear Dumb Diary book was first announced on Jim Benton's website. The film utilizes plotlines and aspects from various installments in the Dear Dumb Diary series. The main storylines of the Jump-A-Thon and Aunt Carol's mystery date originate from Never Do Anything, Ever and Can Adults Become Human?, respectively. The side story of Jamie stealing Angeline's permanent record is borrowed from Let's Pretend This Never Happened, while the "zone-shampooing" gag originates from a storyline in Am I The Princess Or The Frog?. Three of the original songs, "Dear Future Jamie", "My Awesomeness is Awesome", and "Meatloaf Mystery", were written by Dan Mackenzie. Other songs were written by Steven Argila and Seth Freeman.

=== Music ===
The songs include:

- Dear Dumb Diary (performed by Emily Alyn Lind)
- Same Girl (performed by Emily Alyn Lind)
- Just A Number (performed by Emily Alyn Lind)
- My Awesomeness Is Awesome (performed by Emily Alyn Lind)
- May The Dumb Be With You (performed by Emily Alyn Lind)
- Dear Future Jamie (performed by Emily Alyn Lind)
- Meatloaf Mystery (performed by Lea DeLaria)
- Perfect People Of The World (performed by Emily Alyn Lind)
- Paparazzi (performed by Emily Alyn Lind)
- Love Is Everything (performed by Lea Andreone)

The soundtrack includes "Score Suite for Dear Dumb Diary" performed by Steven Argila, the film's composer, and "Dear Dumb Diary (Karaoke Mix)" by Emily Alyn Lind.

== Reception ==
The film received mixed reviews. Common Sense Media gave it 4 out of 5 and said that "books-inspired movie has great social messages for kids". Pretty Famous has ranked the film 49%.
