= Naomi (TV series) =

2022 American superhero drama television series

- Genre: Drama; Superhero
- Created by: Ava DuVernay & Jill Blankenship
- Based on: Characters created for DC by Brian Bendis, Jamal Campbell, and David F. Walker
- Starring: Kaci Walfall; Cranston Johnson; Alexander Wraith; Mary-Charles Jones; Mouzam Makkar; Daniel Puig; Camila Moreno; Will Meyers; Aidan Gemme; Barry Watson
- Music by: Amanda Jones
- Country of origin: United States
- Original language: English
- No. of seasons: 1
- No. of episodes: 13

Production
- Executive producers: Jill Blankenship; Paul Garnes; Ava DuVernay
- Producers: Brian Bendis; Nellie Nugiel; Moe Bardach
- Cinematography: Matthew Lloyd; Cliff Charles
- Editors: Gina Hirsch; John Reyes-Nguyen; Peter Basinski; Martin Wilson; Melissa Gearhart; Jennifer Van Goethem; Dan Downer
- Running time: 41–42 minutes
- Production companies: ARRAY Filmworks; DC Entertainment; Warner Bros. Television

Original release
- Network: The CW
- Release: January 11 – May 10, 2022

Naomi is an American superhero drama television series created by Ava DuVernay and Jill Blankenship which is based on the comic book series of the same name co-written by Brian Michael Bendis and David F. Walker and illustrated by Jamal Campbell. It follows Naomi McDuffie, a comic book-loving teenager and the host of a Superman fan website who learns she has powers and sets out to determine their origins with help from her best friend, her supporting adoptive parents, and a tattoo shop owner with a secret origin after a supernatural event occurs in Port Oswego, Oregon. The series stars Kaci Walfall, Cranston Johnson, Alexander Wraith, Mary-Charles Jones, Mouzam Makkar, Daniel Puig, Camila Moreno, Will Meyers, Aidan Gemme, and Barry Watson. It premiered on The CW on January 11, 2022, and concluded on May 10, 2022. In May 2022, the series was canceled after one season.

== Cast and characters ==
=== Main ===
- Kaci Walfall as Naomi McDuffie, an intelligent, confident comic book-loving teenager who discovers she has powers
- Cranston Johnson as Zumbado, the owner of a local car lot with a hidden agenda who eventually becomes an ally to Naomi
- Alexander Wraith as Dee, a local tattoo store owner who is a Thanagarian and serves as Naomi's mentor
- Mary-Charles Jones as Annabelle, Naomi's loyal best friend
- Mouzam Makkar as Jennifer McDuffie, Naomi's adoptive mother who is a linguist
- Daniel Puig as Nathan, a jock who is Naomi's ex-boyfriend
- Camila Moreno as Lourdes, a young woman and comic book enthusiast with a sarcastic sense of humor who works in a vintage collectibles shop and has a crush on Naomi
- Will Meyers as Anthony, a townie in Port Oswego who is Naomi's friend but has a crush on her
- Aidan Gemme as Jacob, Annabelle's loyal boyfriend and a UFO enthusiast
- Barry Watson as Greg McDuffie, Naomi's adoptive father and an active duty military officer

=== Recurring ===
- Stephanie March as Akira, an old colleague of Zumbado

=== Guest ===
- Chase Anderson as Adam Blake, a superhero with a hipster personality that knows Dee
- Ray Porter as Brutus

In addition, Alie Urquhart costars as Esme Brooks, class president of Port Oswego High school and Naomi's rival while Brian Brightman co-stars as Commander Steel, a U.S. Military Commander based in Port Oswego.

== Episodes ==
No.	Title	Directed by	Written by	Original air date	Prod. code	U.S. viewers (millions)
1	"Don't Believe Everything You Think"	Amanda Marsalis	Teleplay by : Ava DuVernay & Jill Blankenship	January 11, 2022	T53.10001	0.80
In Port Oswego, Oregon, Superman fan site host Naomi McDuffie gets a text from her best friend Annabelle informing her something related to Superman is happening. Naomi passes out on her way to see the event. When she comes to, she learns she missed an apparent battle between Superman and a blue-skinned villain. After reviewing security footage, she sees Superman and also seems to recognize Dee, a tattoo artist. When confronted by Naomi and Annabelle, Dee confesses to staging the event for publicity. At a debate, Naomi passes out again and is told she had a panic attack. She notices a military man with a note regarding a "SUPERMAN ROCKET" in the woods. Naomi goes and finds a disc with alien writing on it before being confronted by Zumbado, a local car dealership owner, who tells her they are both "different". Leaves begin to swirl around Naomi and she runs away, leaving the disc behind. Later, she and her friends break into Zumbado's dealership and find a newspaper describing a UFO sighting on March 14, 2004, the same day Naomi was adopted. Naomi confronts Dee, who reveals himself to be a Thanagarian.
2	"Unidentified Flying Object"	DeMane Davis	Jill Blankenship	January 18, 2022	T53.10102	0.73
Dee tells Naomi that she herself is an alien. The next day he tries to get her to jump off a bridge to activate her hidden powers, but Naomi refuses. Later, in a forest, she discovers that she has super-hearing. While investigating the crash site of a UFO in 2004, Naomi and her friends are surprised by Zumbado. She attempts to use her powers to ward him off, but he reveals he also has powers and scares her away. Naomi returns to Dee, who offers to teach her how to use her powers.
3	"Zero to Sixty"	Sheldon Candis	Oscar Balderrama	January 25, 2022	T53.10103	0.59
Catching her parents watching a video of her as a young child, Naomi begins questioning where she really wants to go to college. Meanwhile, Zumbado approaches an old former colleague of his named Akira who's wanting him to leave her out of his misguided ways as it's revealed that it's his fault that he caused the meteor shower in the first place. Dee begins training Naomi to use her powers responsibly where he even introduces her to his friend Adam Blake. Naomi and Annabelle seek to get the disc back from Zumbado, and with help from Nathan, Jacob, Anthony and Lourdes, try to find out its origin.
4	"Enigma"	Neema Barnette	Stephanie Coggins	February 1, 2022	T53.10104	0.51
Flashbacks reveal how Naomi was found by Greg and Jennifer. As Naomi deals with learning that she's an alien, just like Superman, she also deals with the school pressuring her to be the school's new class president. Meanwhile, Dee continues to train Naomi, but Naomi is struggling to control her emotions during training. Naomi later confronts Zumbado, wanting the disc back, yet Zumbado gives her the disc without starting a fight, with him saying to not believe everything that she thinks. Even Naomi confronts Akira and finds out more about Earth-29, the earth where she came from. Later, she, Annabelle and Jacob try deciphering the code off the disc. Meanwhile, Greg and his general begin discovering that someone has appeared through a portal, that person being a bounty hunter, out to hunt Naomi and bring her back to his earth. Luckily, Dee saves her at the last minute. In the end, Naomi finally finds out what she wants in life, as she runs for class president and rekindles her relationship with Nathan.
5	"Shadow Ridge"	Stephanie Turner	Jason Ganzel	February 22, 2022	T53.10105	0.48
Seven months ago, Naomi and Nathan go on their first date. In the present, Naomi trains with Dee to fight or face her emotions and does well in her first meditation. But she's still dealing with her fears of dying at the hands of the bounty hunter, if Dee never showed up. Meanwhile, Naomi and the rest of the school take a trip to Camp Shadow Ridge, and learn of something haunting the campgrounds. Later, Jennifer and Greg speak with Greg's general about an artifact that resembles Naomi's logo. Naomi and Nathan meet up and see Anthony pass out in front of them. Naomi visits Anthony in the ER and learns that he snuck out, heard someone and saw glowing rocks. Later, Naomi and her friends ask about what is going on in the woods, but Naomi and Anthony find out Counselor Jeff is responsible. Jennifer and Greg later try to erase all evidence to protect Naomi; Dee and Zumbado reluctantly team up to stop the bounty hunter; Dee learns that his former lover was on the hunter's list.
6	"Homecoming"	Kent Faulcon	Stacy A. Littlejohn	March 1, 2022	T53.10106	0.48
While skateboarding, Naomi, Jennifer and Greg see Zumbado. At a Homecoming committee meeting, Esme, Anthony and Nathan have an argument. Naomi tries to figure out what Zumbado's hiding; she and Dee train; Dee reveals he needs to find his former lover, Qyeala, who he believes may still be alive. Naomi struggles to find out what she truly wants in her renewed relationship with Nathan. Naomi and Annabelle return to the mill from episode 2 to find the markings, only to find a secret room where Naomi finds her spaceship with her new power of x-ray vision. Nathan and Anthony get in detention after a fight; the two later patch up their differences and find out that Esme damaged Anthony's architecture project. Realizing that her father is extremely demanding, they settle their dispute with her. Naomi meets Dr. Bell who she believes can help her, and goes to S.T.A.R. Labs, only to realize that she wants her powers for her own purposes, leaving Zumbado to rescue her.
7	"I Am Not a Used Car Salesman"	Lisa France	Jill Blankenship	March 8, 2022	T53.10107	0.43
8	"Fellowship of the Disc"	DeMane Davis	Gussie Roc	March 22, 2022	T53.10108	0.53
Naomi's super-hearing allows her to overhear her parents planning to leave Port Oswego. Naomi tells Annabelle, but she takes the news bad. Naomi tells her that Brutus is after her and everyone she loves. That night, while Greg and Jen are on their anniversary trip, Naomi finds out someone stole the disc in her bedroom. The next night, Naomi goes to investigate the explosion at S.T.A.R Labs, but Jacob arrives and falling beam almost hits him, causing Naomi to save him, revealing her secret. The next morning, Naomi tells Jacob not to tell Annabelle, but she suspects something's going on. Naomi and Jacob use the hard drive from STAR Labs, allowing them to track aliens. They find a storage unit owned by her parents with fake passports and money. Naomi confronts them and they reveal if they ever had to go on the run. At the anniversary party, Naomi apologizes for Annabelle keeping her secret, because she wanted to keep her safe. Naomi and Annabelle get a 911 text from Jacob, who reveals that there is an alien at the party.
9	"Keep Your Friends Close"	Charles Stone III	Rebecca Bellotto	March 29, 2022	T53.10109	0.47
10	"Fallout"	Angel Kristi Williams	Oscar Balderrama	April 26, 2022	T53.10110	0.45
Naomi leaves the house after discovering her parents' secret and heads to Annabelle's house. She says she can't trust any of the adults again. At the shop, Naomi discovers Zumbado already knew where her parents came from, making her furious. Later, Naomi destroys her birth rock and discovers a cube. She runs into Akira and she tells her the cube is for teleportation to ever go back to Earth-29. An assassin named Mac visits Akira and tries to force her to join her and Brutus to kill Naomi, but refuses. Later that night, Naomi goes to a party after Lourdes' invite, and Mac stalked Naomi to the party. They fight and Naomi defeats her. She returns to her house and says she's not ready to talk to her parents yet.
11	"Worst Prom Ever"	Merawi Gerima	Rebecca Bellotto	May 3, 2022	T53.10111	0.47
It is the Winter Wonderland prom at Port Oswego High School. They all dance, but Naomi hears a buzzing and tells Annabelle and Jacob about it and thinks it is in the bathroom. Naomi and Annabelle investigate the vent and discover it's blocked by a force-field. Nathan finds them and he decides to leave. Naomi stops him and explains what she found out last month. Nathan is shocked, but decides to help her. An assassin named Julian arrives and decides to give the device to deactivate the field. If she deactivates one, the other blows up. If she runs fast enough, she can deactivate both. She runs fast and unlocks a superspeed power deactivates both of the force fields. Naomi and Nathan dance and Nathan tells them they can't be together, but will always be by her side.
12	"Ready or Not"	Carl Seaton	Jill Blankenship	May 10, 2022	T53.10112	0.44
In a flashback on Earth-29, baby Naomi is being spirited away from Brutus to protect her. In present day, Naomi gets another vision and Akira tells her it is clairvoyance and thinks that the power source is on Earth and will amplify Naomi"s powers. She gives Naomi her mother's locket. Later, Naomi and Annabelle go on a road trip to find the field Naomi saw in her vision. At a motel, one of Brutus' people arrives, looking for Naomi. Naomi and Annabelle manage to escape. Later, they are able to find the field, but the assassin shows up and fights Naomi unlocking an invulnerability power. She combine the disc and the locket which makes a door. It leads her to Earth-29. Two voices tell her the actual power source is Naomi and will need the full power of the 29 so it can work. They tell her to trust no one because someone betrayed them and led to their demise. Meanwhile, Anthony and Lourdes investigate the Superman stunt, but are attacked by the assassin and Dee saves them. At the shop, Dee and Zumbado tell Anthony and Lourdes that Naomi is an alien.
13	"Who Am I?"	DeMane Davis	Ava DuVernay & Jill Blankenship	May 10, 2022	T53.10113	0.43
Naomi tell her parents that she was overwhelmed when she met her birth parents because it felt real. They decide to leave that night. On the road, Julian and the assassin are in front of them. They activate a force-field and the car crashes. Naomi is the only one left. Naomi and Annabelle go to the shop and Dee is also gone. All of the adults were kidnapped. Naomi and Annabelle find their friends at a paintball tournament. The assassin is also there, but flees before Naomi can catch him. Later, her friends are able to find the adults at the warehouse. Naomi arrives and finds a portal. She goes through and finds Brutus. Before he can amplify her memories of Earth-29, she defeats him. 2 days later, Naomi and her parents are burying the transport vessel. When Naomi touches it, she finds out that they killed her birth parents. Furious, she flies away.

== Production ==
=== Development ===
On December 4, 2020, it was reported that Ava DuVernay and Jill Blankenship are developing a series for The CW based on the comic book series Naomi, co-written by Brian Bendis and David F. Walker and illustrated by Jamal Campbell. On February 9, 2021, The CW gave the production a pilot order. On May 24, 2021, Naomi was picked up to series. The series is created by DuVernay and Jill Blankenship who are expected to executive produce alongside Sarah Bremner and Paul Garnes. The pilot is written by DuVernay and directed by Amanda Marsalis. The production companies involved with the series are Array Filmworks and Warner Bros. Television. The series premiered on January 11, 2022. On May 12, 2022, The CW canceled the series after one season.

=== Casting ===
In March 2021, Kaci Walfall was cast in the titular role while Alexander Wraith, Cranston Johnson, Camila Moreno, Barry Watson, Mouzam Makkar, Mary-Charles Jones, Aidan Gemme, Daniel Puig and Will Meyers were also tapped as series regulars. In December 2021, Stephanie March joined the cast in a guest starring role. In January 2022, Chase Anderson was cast in an undisclosed capacity.

=== Filming ===
Principal photography for the series began on August 23, 2021, in Georgia. Cliff Charles is a cinematographer while DeMane Davis is a director for the series.

== International release ==
In Latin America, Naomi premiered on HBO Max on January 27, 2022. In Scandinavia, it premiered on HBO Max on February 3, 2022.

In Italy it aired on 20 Mediaset.

== Reception ==
=== Critical response ===
The review aggregator website Rotten Tomatoes reported a 91% approval rating with an average rating of 7/10, based on 27 critic reviews. The website's critics consensus reads, "Kaci Walfall proves a plucky enough heroine to give the deliberately-paced Naomi its own super-powered charm." Metacritic, which uses a weighted average, assigned a score of 72 out of 100 based on 9 critics, indicating "generally favorable reviews".

=== Ratings ===
According to Samba TV, 313,000 U.S. households streamed the premiere on the first day of availability.

Viewership and ratings per episode of Naomi television ratings
No.	Title	Air date	Rating (18–49)	Viewers (millions)	DVR (18–49)	DVR viewers (millions)	Total (18–49)	Total viewers (millions)
1	"Don't Believe Everything You Think"	January 11, 2022	0.1	0.80	—N/a	—N/a	—N/a	—N/a
2	"Unidentified Flying Object"	January 18, 2022	0.1	0.73	0.1	0.32	0.2	1.05 (Note: Live+7 ratings were unavailable, so Live+3 ratings have been used instead.)
3	"Zero to Sixty"	January 25, 2022	0.1	0.59	0.1	0.45	0.2	1.04
4	"Enigma"	February 1, 2022	0.1	0.51	—N/a	—N/a	—N/a	—N/a
5	"Shadow Ridge"	February 22, 2022	0.1	0.48	0.1	0.27	0.1	0.75
6	"Homecoming"	March 1, 2022	0.1	0.48	0.1	0.28	0.1	0.73
7	"I Am Not a Used Car Salesman"	March 8, 2022	0.1	0.43	0.1	0.35	0.1	0.78
8	"Fellowship of the Disc"	March 22, 2022	0.1	0.53	0.1	0.37	0.2	0.89
9	"Keep Your Friends Close"	March 29, 2022	0.1	0.47	0.1	0.34	0.1	0.80
10	"Fallout"	April 26, 2022	0.1	0.45	0.0	0.30	0.1	0.75
11	"Worst Prom Ever"	May 3, 2022	0.1	0.47	—N/a	—N/a	—N/a	—N/a
12	"Ready or Not"	May 10, 2022	0.1	0.44	—N/a	—N/a	—N/a	—N/a
13	"Who Am I?"	May 10, 2022	0.1	0.43	—N/a	—N/a	—N/a	—N/a
