= Kaci Walfall =

American actress (born 2004)

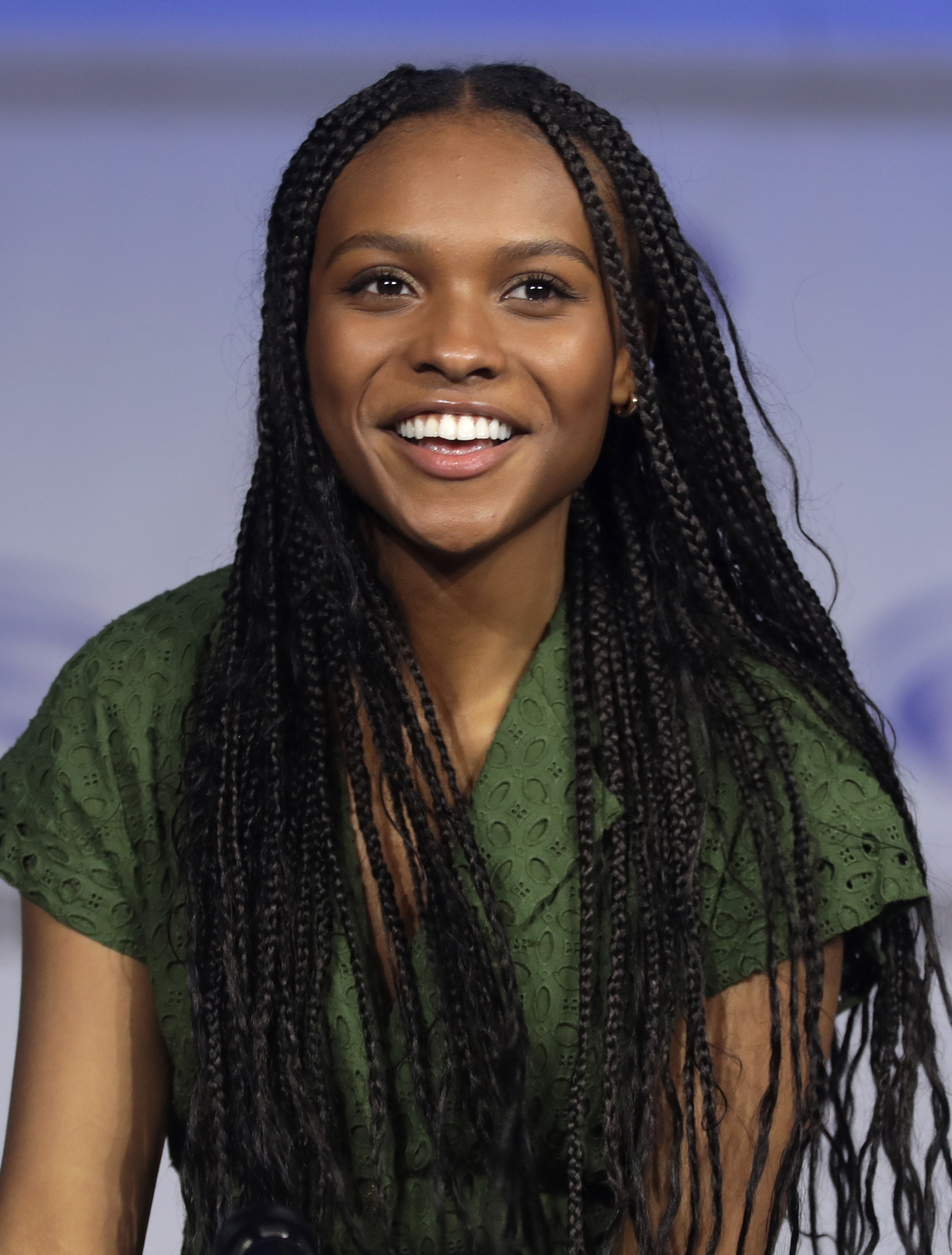
- Walfall at the 2022 WonderCon
- Born: 2004 or 2005 (age 21–22); Brooklyn, New York, U.S.
- Occupation: Actress
- Known for: Naomi

Kaci Walfall (born 2004 or 2005) is an American actress known for playing the title role in Naomi.

== Early life ==
Walfall was born in Brooklyn, New York.

== Career ==
Walfall began pursuing acting at the age of 7. She made her Broadway debut two years later, at the age of 9, in the musical The Lion King.

At age 11, Walfall originated the role of Lavender in the first American national tour of Matilda the Musical. Around the same time, she was featured in a commercial for Fruity Pebbles cereal.

In 2021, it was announced that Walfall had been cast to play Naomi McDuffie in the television show Naomi. The show, based on the 2019 DC comic series of the same name, began production later that year. Naomi premiered on The CW in January 2022. However, the show was cancelled later that year after just one season.

In 2022, it was announced that Walfall would appear in the final season of Queen Sugar.

== Filmography ==
=== Television ===
Year	Title	Role	Notes
2013	Army Wives	Nyah	Recurring role (season 7)
2014	Person of Interest	Tracie Booker	Episode: "Brotherhood"
2017	Power	Tamara	Episode: "You Lied to My Face"
2021	The Equalizer	Nicki	Episodes: "Lifeline" and "The Room Where It Happens"
2021	Modern Love	Young Meesha	Episode: "A Life Plan for Two, Followed by One"
2022	Naomi	Naomi McDuffie	Lead role
2022	World's Funniest Animals	Herself	Episode 302
2022	Queen Sugar	Rae	Season 7, Episode 11: "We Can Be"
2025	Dope Thief	Marietta	Main role

=== Theatre ===
Year	Title	Role	Notes
2014	The Lion King	Young Nala	
2015	Matilda the Musical	Lavender	Touring production
