= Intimidation Game =

- Law & Order: Special Victims Unit episode
- Episode no.: Season 16; Episode 14
- Directed by: Jean de Segonzac
- Story by: Julie Martin; Céline C. Robinson; Robert Brooks Cohen
- Teleplay by: Céline C. Robinson; Robert Brooks Cohen
- Production code: 1614
- Original air date: February 11, 2015

Guest appearances
- Mouzam Makkar as Raina Punjabi; Logan Paul as Ryan; Toby Turner as Game host; Jack Vale as himself; James Ciccone as Peter O'Neil

Episode chronology
← Previous "Decaying Morality"	Next → "Undercover Mother"
- Law & Order: Special Victims Unit season 16

"Intimidation Game" is the fourteenth episode of the sixteenth season of the police procedural television series Law & Order: Special Victims Unit. The episode aired on February 11, 2015, on NBC. In the episode, which was loosely inspired by the Gamergate controversy, a female video game developer is harassed and threatened by a group of misogynistic cyber terrorists. The episode featured guest appearances from Logan Paul, Toby Turner, Jack Vale and James Ciccone.

== Synopsis ==
Video game developer Raina Punjabi (Mouzam Makkar) ignores warnings from online predators as the release date of her game arrives. When a female employee is soon assaulted at a game convention, the detectives ask Punjabi to halt the game's release. When she refuses, Fin and SVU must race to protect her from technically skilled predators that want to see Punjabi out of the gaming business.

== Reception ==
=== Critical response ===
Announced on January 29, 2015 and aired on NBC in the United States on February 11, 2015, the episode received negative reviews for its portrayal of gaming culture and "sexism in video games."

=== Ratings ===
According to TV by the Numbers, the episode's original broadcast was watched by 6.12 million viewers and acquired a 1.4 rating/4% share in the 18–49 demographic.
