= Han Lim Lee =

American illustrator

- Born: Seoul, Korea
- Occupation: Illustrator

Han Lim Lee is an American illustrator. The most notable character, he created is the monkey with attitude, Bobby Jack.

== Career ==
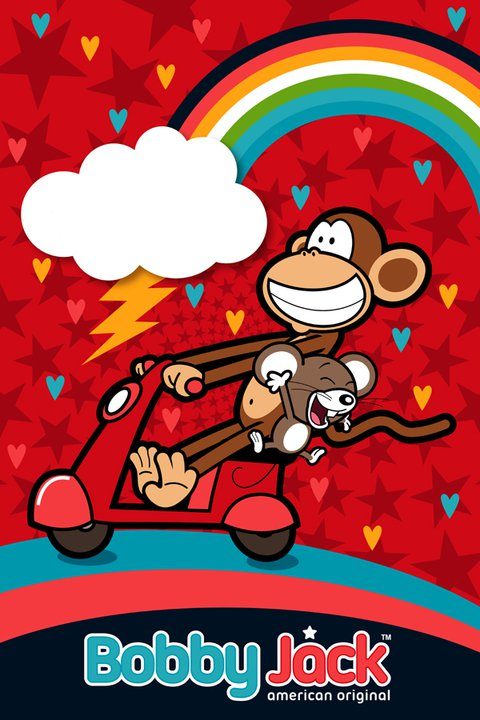
Bobby Jack and Moose riding a scooter.

Han started his creative career as a freelance artist selling random prints of his art to various buyers. Han applied as a freelance designer for a clothing manufacturer. While working with at company, he created a lifestyle brand based on a monkey character named Bobby Jack. The name, Bobby Jack, originated from the first names of owners of the company, Bob and Jack. What started out as a monkey print on a shirt, Bobby Jack became a complete lifestyle brand in multiple categories such as accessories, toys, room decor, and stationery. Bobby Jack became the most popular clothing among children.
