= Mouzam Makkar =

Indian-born American actress and producer

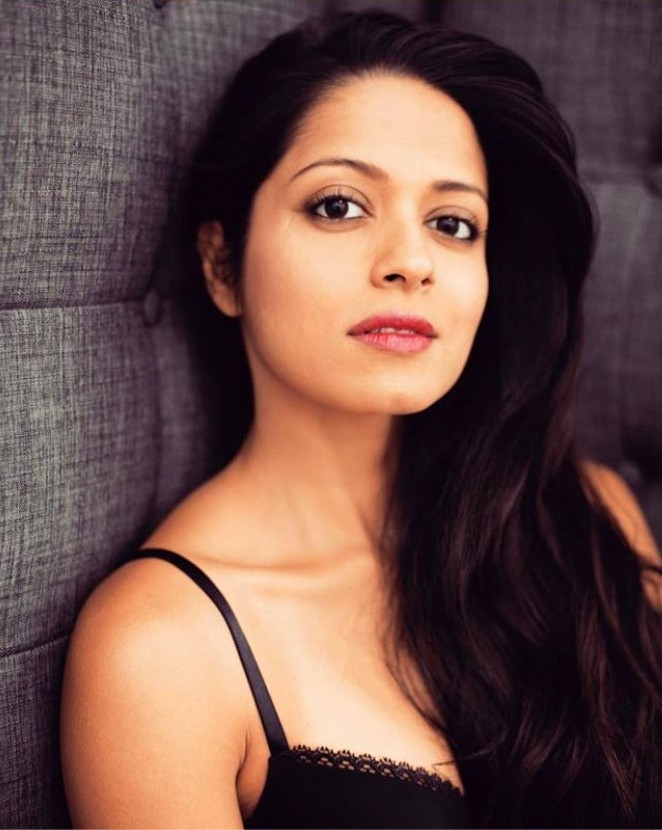
- Born: Thiruvananthapuram, Kerala, India
- Citizenship: American
- Occupation: Actress
- Years active: 2008 – present

Mouzam Makkar is an Indian-born American actress.

== Early life and education ==
Makkar was born in Thiruvananthapuram, Kerala, India and lived her childhood there, then she school in the United Arab Emirates as her parents moved there. Later when, she was twelve, moved to the United States. She graduated from the University of Illinois at Urbana–Champaign in three years with First Class Honors and a Bachelor of Science in Finance.

== Career ==
Makkar was a regular cast member in the ABC series The Fix and the NBC series Champions. She also had recurring roles in the TV series The Vampire Diaries, The Exorcist, and Easy Abby. In 2012, she guest-starred as Anna on Chicago Fire. In 2015, she played the role of Mrs. Negani in the thriller film Consumed, directed by Daryl Wein.

Makker played video game developer Raina Punjabi on Law & Order: Special Victims Unit in the episode "Intimidation Game", which aired on February 11, 2015. She returned for four episodes in 2018, 2020, and 2022 as defense lawyer Dara Miglani.

Makker played Jennifer McDuffie, adoptive mother of the titular character, on Naomi.

== Filmography ==
Year	Film	Role	Notes
2008	Disgruntled	Tess Thompson	
2011	Shedding for the Wedding		
2011	The Catastrophe	Forough	Short
2011	The Balancing Game	Mindy	Short
2012	The Mob Doctor		Series 1 Episode
2012	Waterwalk	Jill Hansen	
2012	Chicago Fire	Anna	Series 2 Episodes
2012	The Queen of My Dreams		Short
2013	Promise Land	Sania Khan	
2013	Simanaheen	Sonia	
2013	Back in the Game	Chandeep	Series 1 Episode
2013	Betrayal	Tina	Series 1 Episode
2013	Easy Abby	Danielle	Series 5 Episodes
2014	Sober Companion	Alex	
2014	Matador	Silda Patel	Series 2 Episodes
2014	Stalker	Terry Holt	Series 1 Episode
2014	Bones	Selena	Series 1 Episode
2014	See Dad Run	Princess Carla	Series 1 Episode
2015	Consumed	Mrs. Negani	
2015	The Following	Dana	Series 2 Episodes
2015	Kam Kardashian		
2015	Unveiled	Gabrielle Horne	
2015	American Horror Story	Nurse Leena	Series 1 Episode
2015	Law & Order: Special Victims Unit	Raina Punjabi	Series 5 Episodes
2015	The First Session	Amina	Short
2016	Mars Project	Chandra Devi	
2016	Halloweed	Rosa	
2016	The Exorcist	Jessica	Series 8 Episodes
2016	The Vampire Diaries	Alexandria Alex St. John	Series 7 Episodes
2017	Chicago Justice	Kalila Rafiq	Series 1 Episode
2017	9JKL	Lily	Series 1 Episode
2018	Champions	Britney	Series 10 Episodes
2018	Freelancers Anonymous	Sam	
2018	Kill Game	Mara Simone	
2018	Alone Together	Amanda	Series 1 Episode
2019	The Fix	Loni Kampour	Series 10 Episodes
2019	NCIS	Mira Azam	Series 2 Episodes
2020	She's in Portland	Jennifer	
2020	Freudian Slip	Kolpana	Short
2022	SEAL Team	Commander Nouri	Series 3 Episodes
2022	Naomi	Jennifer McDuffie	Series 13 Episodes
2025	The Neighborhood	Sara	Series 2 Episodes
