= Identity Thief =

2013 film by Seth Gordon

- Theatrical release poster
- Directed by: Seth Gordon
- Screenplay by: Craig Mazin
- Story by: Jerry Eeten; Craig Mazin
- Produced by: Scott Stuber; Jason Bateman; Pamela Abdy
- Starring: Jason Bateman; Melissa McCarthy; Jon Favreau; Amanda Peet; Tip 'T.I.' Harris; Genesis Rodriguez; Morris Chestnut; John Cho; Robert Patrick; Eric Stonestreet
- Cinematography: Javier Aguirresarobe
- Edited by: Peter Teschner
- Music by: Christopher Lennertz
- Production companies: Relativity Media; Bluegrass Films; Aggregate Films
- Distributed by: Universal Pictures
- Release date: February 8, 2013
- Running time: 111 minutes
- Country: United States
- Language: English
- Budget: $35 million
- Box office: $175.4 million

Identity Thief is a 2013 American road comedy film directed by Seth Gordon, written by Craig Mazin from a story by Mazin and Jerry Eeten. It stars Jason Bateman, Melissa McCarthy, Jon Favreau, Amanda Peet, Tip 'T.I.' Harris, Genesis Rodriguez, Morris Chestnut, John Cho, Robert Patrick, and Eric Stonestreet.

The film tells the fictional story of Sandy Patterson, a man whose identity is stolen by a female con artist. After the police tell him that it will take up to a year to solve the case, Sandy embarks on a cross-country road trip to find her and clear his name.

Identity Thief was released by Universal Pictures on February 8, 2013. The film received negative reception from critics, but grossed $175.4 million worldwide against a $35 million budget.

== Plot ==
In Denver, a man named Sandy Patterson is tricked into buying phony identity theft protection from con artist Diana over the phone and he reveals all of his personal information. At work, after clashing with his boss Harold Cornish, Sandy receives a call mentioning that he has an appointment at a salon in Florida. Confused, he ignores it when co-worker Daniel Casey suggests that they and others quit and start their own firm. Sandy agrees to join them.

When paying for gas, Sandy's credit card is declined, and the clerk cuts it in half. The card company says that Sandy spent thousands of dollars in Florida, and he is arrested for missing a court date there. At the Denver police station, detective Reilly eventually determines that Diana stole Sandy's identity.

The police ask Daniel, now Sandy's boss, about his alleged possession of drugs. Sandy's name was used to buy drugs from someone named Paolo. When the cops say that they can only do something if the identity thief is in Denver, Sandy offers to retrieve her and convince her to clear his name.

At the salon in Winter Park, Florida, Sandy confronts the other 'Sandy' aka Diana, who steals his rental car. Finding her address in her abandoned car, he investigates her house, which is full of merchandise and stolen credit cards. The pair scuffle; before Sandy can handcuff her, criminals Marisol and Julian burst in, angry that Diana gave Paolo bad credit cards.

After Sandy and Diana escape, he mentions his plan to restore his reputation, and she agrees to help. Meanwhile, a skiptracer is dispatched to track down Diana for a bounty. Because their IDs are identical, airline flight is impossible, so they travel by car.

The skiptracer eventually catches up to the pair, capturing Diana. A chase ensues; she knocks him unconscious, and Sandy rams his van off the road. They take the skiptracer's van, then tie him up in back. When it overheats, they continue on foot through the woods.

Sandy discards his pants after finding a snake in them, then Diana accidentally knocks him unconscious when another bites his neck. Sandy wakes at a bus station; Diana carried him until she flagged down a truck. As the next bus to Denver leaves in three days, Sandy uses money hidden in his socks to buy a $200 car. Meanwhile, Marisol shoots the skiptracer, and the criminals continue their pursuit of Sandy and Diana. For gas money, the pair con an accounts processor in a bank and steal Cornish's identity to create new credit cards.

In St. Louis, the two share dinner, and Diana admits that she does not know her real name. The accounts processor enters with cops, who arrest them both. Diana uncuffs herself in the back of the police car, breaks the back windshield, and escapes with Sandy. The skiptracer shoots Marisol and Julian, finds Diana and Sandy on the highway mid-escape, and hits Diana with his car. Sandy comes to her aid, but Diana revives and defensively strikes him in the throat.

As Sandy and Diana escape, the skiptracer is arrested by the police alongside Marisol and Julian. The pair get to Denver where Diana has dinner with Sandy's family and reconciles with them. That night, Sandy and his wife secretly agree not to turn her in even if it means that he will lose his job.

The next morning, Sandy finds Diana gone and a note that apologizes for the trouble she caused. Sandy prepares to quit his job, but Daniel shows him that she is meeting with the police in an office. Diana is later taken away in cuffs, and Sandy is no longer part of the investigation.

One year later, Sandy celebrates another birthday, this time with his third child. The family visits Diana in prison, and he presents her with a birth certificate that reveals her real name as Dawn Budgie. Diana then hugs Sandy and goes inside, but when a female guard antagonizes her, she punches her, and another guard stuns her with a taser. As Diana recovers and walks back to her cell, Sandy watches, shocked.

== Cast ==
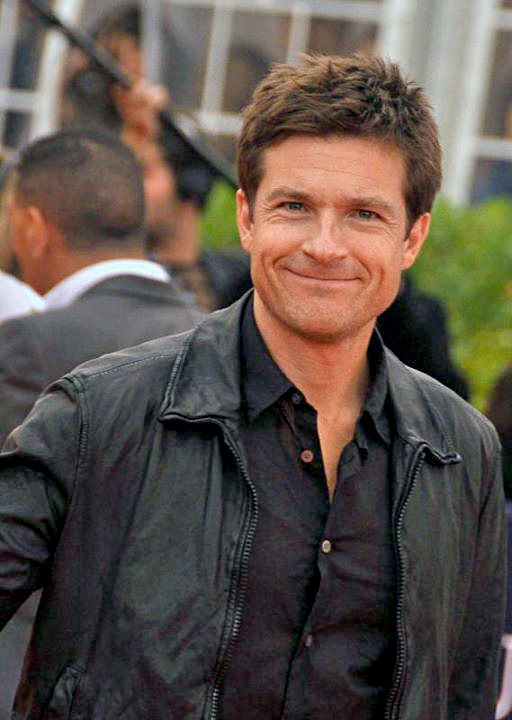
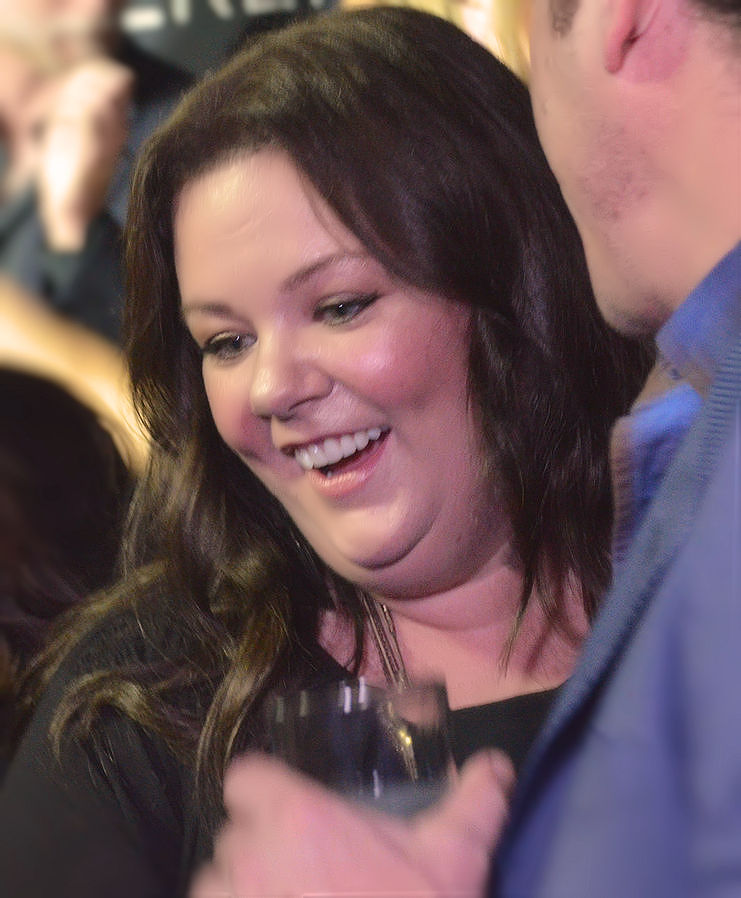
Jason Bateman and Melissa McCarthy starred as Sandy and Diana respectively.
- Jason Bateman as Sandy Patterson, a Denver accountant
- Melissa McCarthy as Diana, a con artist living in Florida
- Jon Favreau as Harold Cornish, Sandy's Chief Executive
- Amanda Peet as Trish Patterson, Sandy's wife
- Tip 'T.I.' Harris as Julian, a criminal mercenary and Marisol's partner
- Génesis Rodríguez as Marisol, a criminal mercenary
- Morris Chestnut as Reilly, a Denver detective
- John Cho as Daniel Casey, Sandy's colleague and subsequently his boss
- Robert Patrick as an unnamed skiptracer who tracks down Diana
- Eric Stonestreet as Big Chuck, a real estate agent and short-term love interest for Diana
- Jonathan Banks as Paul, the boss of Marisol and Julian
- Ryan Gaul as a bartender
- Mary-Charles Jones as Franny Patterson, Sandy and Trish's daughter
- Maggie Elizabeth Jones as Jessie Patterson, Sandy and Trish's daughter
- Carlos Navarro as Luis, a gas station attendant
- Ben Falcone as Tony and motel desk clerk
- Carmela Zumbado as the Salon Salesperson
- Kevin Covais as Kevin (uncredited)
- Clark Duke as Everett (uncredited)
- Ellie Kemper as Flo (uncredited)

== Production ==
The film was first conceived as a project with two male leads, but that changed when Jason Bateman saw Melissa McCarthy in Bridesmaids and pushed for her to star alongside him. Jerry Eeten wrote an early draft, later finished by Craig Mazin with a final rewrite by Seth Gordon. In January 2012, Gordon was announced as the director of the film with Scott Stuber producing through his Stuber Pictures banner with Bateman and Peter Morgan for DumbDumb. In April 2012, John Cho, Clark Duke and Amanda Peet joined the cast. In May 2012, Jon Favreau and Morris Chestnut also joined the cast.

Some filming took place in Atlanta at the 191 Peachtree Tower, around May 2012. Scenes were also filmed on Peachtree Street in Midtown Atlanta, at The Colonnade restaurant on Cheshire Bridge Road in Morningside, and at Perimeter Mall. Scenes from the film were also shot at Salon 2000 in Ansley Mall.

== Release ==
In March 2012, a release date of May 10, 2013 was announced. In June 2012, the release date changed to February 8, 2013.

== Home media ==
Identity Thief was released on DVD and Blu-ray on June 4, 2013.

== Reception ==
=== Box office ===
Identity Thief grossed $134.5 million in the United States and Canada, and $40.9 million in other countries, for a worldwide total of $175.4 million against a budget of $35 million.

Identity Thief opened at #1 at the box office with $34.6 million in its first weekend, which was considered remarkable by analysts since a major winter storm, often a concern with winter dump months releases, forced theater closings and kept moviegoers at home in the densely populated Northeast.

=== Critical response ===
On the review aggregator website Rotten Tomatoes, 20% of 173 critics' reviews are positive, with an average rating of 4.2/10. The website's consensus reads: ""Identity Thief's few laughs are attributable to Melissa McCarthy and Jason Bateman, who labor mightily to create a framework for the movie's undisciplined plotline"." Metacritic, which uses a weighted average, assigned the film a score of 35 out of 100, based on 41 critics, indicating "generally unfavorable" reviews. Audiences polled by CinemaScore gave the film an average grade of "B" on an A+ to F scale.

R. Kurt Osenlund of Slant Magazine gave the film a positive review, rating it 3 out of 4 stars, praising McCarthy's performance, writing that she "gives a performance leagues better than anything to be expected in a mainstream, early-in-the-year release, padding a typically sketched character with layers of hilarity and pathos. McCarthy owns 'Identity Thief' with a turn of limitless surprise, making an otherwise adequate comedy soar as a star vehicle. She is riveting in simply-penned moments of remorse and confession, adding tearful depth to her ace timing and formidable physical comedy." Peter Debruge of Variety magazine praises McCarthy but criticizes the script, saying "Melissa McCarthy proves she’s got what it takes to carry a feature, however meager the underlying material." Richard Roeper of the Chicago Sun-Times gave the film 2 out of 4 and wrote: "It wants to be "Midnight Run" meets "Planes, Trains and Automobiles," but it carries little of the dramatic heft and real-world semi-plausibility of those much superior efforts." He concludes "Here's hoping someone finds a much better vehicle for these terrifically talented actors."

Bob Mondello for NPR described the film as "Two Hours Stolen", calling it "a catalog of missed opportunities", and "uninspired trudge of a road movie". Mondello particularly criticizes the script for wasting the talented lead performers, setting up Bateman as stupid and dull, while subverting McCarthy's improvisational skills and undercutting her comic timing with interruptions. James Berardinelli of ReelViews.com gave the film 1 out 4 and wrote: "This feels a lot like some of the recent, unwatchable Adam Sandler offerings: boorish, unfunny comedy colliding with saccharine, quasi-dramatic filler." He thought the trailer was a fair representation of the film and that viewers that liked it might get more than the few chuckles he got out of the film. Berardinelli says the film is not simply bad but manages to "cross the line into reprehensible." Dana Stevens at Slate.com considers the implications of the “brazenly grotesque" character that McCarthy plays and how it is an uneasy balance between feminist trailblazing and preservation of stereotypes. Stevens would be more willing to forgive the film for "its overfamiliar comic setups and shameless gag-recycling if the movie’s second half didn’t make such an abrupt about-face from soliciting our revulsion to begging for our pity."

In his negative review, Rex Reed made several references to Melissa McCarthy's weight, referring to her as "tractor-sized," "humongous," "obese," and a "hippo," Reed's comments received criticism from various film critics. Reed stood by his comments and stated his objection to the use of serious health issues such as obesity as comedy talking points. He dismissed the outrage as being orchestrated for publicity, but praised McCarthy for not getting involved in the matter, calling her "completely classy." McCarthy later responded, expressing surprise the review was published, and said "I felt really bad for someone who is swimming in so much hate. I just thought, that’s someone who’s in a really bad spot, and I am in such a happy spot. I laugh my head off every day with my husband and my kids".
