= Kevin Can Wait =

American television sitcom (2016–2018)

- Genre: Sitcom
- Created by: Kevin James; Rock Reuben; Bruce Helford
- Directed by: Andy Fickman
- Starring: Kevin James; Erinn Hayes; Taylor Spreitler; Ryan Cartwright; Lenny Venito; Leonard Earl Howze; James DiGiacomo; Mary-Charles Jones; Leah Remini
- Opening theme: "Ordinary Guy" performed by Michael DelGuidice
- Composer: Raney Shockne
- Country of origin: United States
- No. of seasons: 2
- No. of episodes: 48

Production
- Executive producers: Kevin James; Rock Reuben; Jeff Sussman; Andy Fickman; Steve Mosko; Bruce Helford; Rob Long
- Producer: Nancy Chadrow Haas
- Production location: New York
- Camera setup: Multi-camera
- Running time: 21–24 minutes
- Production companies: Hey Eddie Productions; Mohawk Productions; CBS Television Studios; Sony Pictures Television

Original release
- Network: CBS
- Release: September 19, 2016 – May 7, 2018

Kevin Can Wait is an American television sitcom starring Kevin James that aired on CBS from September 19, 2016, to May 7, 2018. The series was created by James, Rock Reuben, and Bruce Helford, marking James' second starring role in a CBS sitcom, following The King of Queens (1998–2007). The show was directed by Andy Fickman.

The series began with James portraying Kevin Gable, a recently retired police officer from Nassau County, New York, and a father of three, who is married to Donna Gable (played by Erinn Hayes). However, in the second season, Donna's character is written out, having died, and the new female lead is Vanessa Cellucci (played by Leah Remini), Kevin's former rival from the police force who becomes his partner at their security company, Monkey Fist Security. While the first season centered on Kevin's family life and his transition into retirement, the second season shifts focus to his new career, partnership with Vanessa, and his life as a single parent.

On May 12, 2018, CBS canceled the series after two seasons.

== Plot ==
Kevin Can Wait follows Kevin Gable (James), a newly retired Nassau County police officer living in Massapequa, New York, on Long Island, with his wife Donna (Hayes) and their three children: daughters Kendra (Taylor Spreitler) and Sara (Mary-Charles Jones), and son Jack Cole (James DiGiacomo). Initially excited about his retirement and plans to spend carefree days with his friends, fellow retired officers Goody (Leonard Earl Howze), Duffy (Lenny Venito), and Mott (Chris Roach), Kevin soon realizes that financial and family pressures complicate his plans. His eldest daughter, Kendra, returns home from college with her unemployed fiancé, Chale (Ryan Cartwright), and the couple moves into the family's garage. Meanwhile, Sara struggles with anger management issues, and Jack, the youngest, is a hypochondriac with anxiety, regularly seeking help from the school therapist.

During the first season, Kevin takes on various odd jobs to supplement his pension while dealing with the family's challenges, including Kendra and Chale's wedding. The first season primarily focuses on Kevin's interactions with his family, particularly Donna, though he is frequently shown spending time with his group of friends. Most scenes take place at the Gable household or at Enzo's, a local bar where Kendra works and Kevin socializes with his friends.

Season 2 begins more than a year after the events of the first season finale. By this time, Donna has died, leaving Kevin a widower raising his three children. He now works full-time with his former rival, Vanessa Cellucci (Leah Remini), at their security company, Monkey Fist Security. With Kevin's reentry into the workforce and Vanessa's more prominent role, the second season also introduces more supporting characters who had not appeared frequently in the first season. The Monkey Fist Security office becomes a key location, and the second season focuses more on Kevin's life as a single parent and his new career.

== Cast and characters ==
=== Main ===
- Kevin James as Kevin Gable: the patriarch of the Gable household. As the series started, Kevin, a recently retired cop married to wife Donna, solves family problems with his down-to-earth principles and some help from Donna. After Donna's death between the first two seasons, the widowed Kevin becomes a helicopter parent who goes to work at a security firm with his ex-partner, Vanessa Cellucci. Kevin is a generally good man at heart, although he tends to sometimes get distracted in his goals. He cares deeply about his family and friends, and is willing to do most anything to help them.
- Erinn Hayes as Donna Gable (Season 1): Kevin's wife and the matriarch of the Gable household for the first season, Donna is a school nurse until she quits in the first-season finale (also her last physical appearance in the series). Donna dies before the second season. (Note: The circumstances of Donna's death were never explained, though several conversations suggest it was sudden. Multiple earlier season two episodes state it's been a year, but in "Cooking Up a Storm", it was stated that Wendy has been chasing after Kevin for ten months.) The episode "The Fantastic Pho" reveals that Kevin and Donna had first met at a bar, and "The Might've Before Christmas" reveals that Vanessa urged Kevin and Donna to get together.
- Taylor Spreitler as Kendra Gable-Witt: The elder Gable daughter, Kendra is a 21-year-old college student (she gets into Columbia Law School in the first-season finale) who also works as a waitress at Enzo's. She has the most prominent role of the three Gable children in the series. In the pilot, she reveals her engagement to her parents and moves back in with her fiancé Chale. Kendra is the most responsible and dependable of the Gable kids. She also shows a tendency to nag, particularly at Chale's expense. She plans her wedding during the first season and marries Chale in the Season 2 premiere after he faces deportation. Following the death of Donna, Kendra becomes the surrogate matriarch of the family.
- Ryan Cartwright as Chale Witt: Kendra's English fiancé and then her husband. He moves into the Gables' garage with Kendra. Chale is shy and soft-spoken, but very intelligent. Kevin is initially hostile to Chale, but their relationship improves over the course of the series. During Season 1, Chale is unemployed but working on an app that he believes will be a huge success. In the Season 2 premiere, Chale marries Kendra as he faces deportation. Chale begins working at Enzo's with Kendra in "Plus One Is the Loneliest Number" and is promoted to manager (and temporarily stops working on his app) in "The Kevin Crown Affair".
- Mary-Charles Jones as Sara Marie Gable: the younger Gable daughter, has anger-management issues and is somewhat a tomboy, as she excels at and loves sports, watches football and frequently fights. She also has a rebellious streak; she has been suspended, stolen her father's money, created a secret second Facebook account and snuck off with her boyfriend. Despite her hostility, she does love her family. In the first season, Sara appears mostly in short, cameo roles, but she becomes more prominent in the second season.
- James DiGiacomo as Jack Gable: the Gables' 11-year-old hypochondriac son, is the weakest of the children and somewhat dim-witted. Though he frequently tries to make friends, he finds little success. In the first season, Jack appears mostly in short, cameo roles, but he becomes more prominent in the second season.
- Gary Valentine as Kyle Gable: Kevin's older brother, is a firefighter with the New York City Fire Department of below-average intelligence. Kyle is a bachelor and has a crush on Vanessa (much to her dismay). At the fire department, Kyle is mainly a cook who does not actually fight fires often. As a part of Kevin's group, he is frequently seen with Kevin's friends and at the Gable household.
- Leonard Earl Howze as Tyrone "Goody" Goodman:
  Tyrone is Kevin's friend from the police force. He is married to Didi, who is a good friend of Donna's. In the second season, Goody begins working for Monkey Fist Security.
- Lenny Venito as Duffy (Season 1): Duffy is Kevin's friend from the police force. He has been divorced three times. Duffy was written out in the second season without any explanation for the character's absence.
- Christopher Brian Roach (also credited as Chris Roach) as Mott: one of Kevin's retired officer friends, and is usually regarded as the dimmest of the group. He is married to Cindy, and has seven young, rambunctious kids. In the second season, Mott begins working for Monkey Fist Security.
- Leah Remini as Vanessa Cellucci (Season 2, Guest appearance in Season 1): Kevin's former partner and rival on the force, is introduced in the two-part first-season finale. Vanessa becomes Kevin's partner in the second episode of Season 2 with her own struggling company, Golden Phoenix Security (later Monkey Fist Security). Vanessa has several exes, many of whom she has dumped for ridiculous and unbelievable reasons.

=== Recurring ===
- Bas Rutten as Rutger van der Kamp, the Gables' annoying Dutch neighbor who becomes Kevin's friend. He lives with his aunt and his long-term girlfriend. During the first season, he works in the warehouse at a big-box store. In the second season, Kevin and Vanessa hire him at their security company, though they are frequently unable to pay him.
- Jim Breuer as Father Philip, the priest at the Gables' Catholic church.
- Joe Starr as Enzo, the owner of Enzo's, and Kendra's (and later Chale's) boss.
- Saidah Arrika Ekulona as Didi, Goody's wife and a friend of Donna's. She frequently worries about Goody's safety as a cop. (Season 1)
- Chris Weidman as Nick Dawson, a rookie cop who is the new partner of Kevin's former partner. (Season 1 (Note: Weidman is also credited in the season two episode "Monkey Fist Insecurity", but does not have any lines.))
- Jackie Sandler as Cindy, Mott's wife.

=== Notable guest stars ===
- Ray Romano as Vic Margolis, an annoying hot-tub salesman, whose son befriends Jack ("Beat the Parents") and he and Kevin were old friends.
- Noah Syndergaard as Halloween Viking ("Hallow-We-Ain't-Home")
- Adam Sandler as Jimmy, Kevin's former partner ("Who's Better Than Us?", "A Band Done"); his nephew, Jared Sandler, also guest starred with him ("Who's Better Than Us?")
- Billy Joel as himself ("Kevin's Bringing Supper Back")
- Harry Connick Jr. as himself ("Kenny Can Wait")
- Chazz Palminteri as Vincent Cellucci, Vanessa's critical father ("Plus One Is the Loneliest Number")
- Loni Love as Yvette, a sassy pawn shop owner ("The Owl")
- Florencia Lozano as Wendy, Kevin's neighbor who frequently brings him food after Donna passes away in hopes of winning his affections ("Cooking Up a Storm", "The Whole Enchilada")
- Ricardo Chavira as Frank, Kevin and Vanessa's former co-worker who now owns a rival security company ("Monkey Fist Insecurity", "Delivery Guy")
- Chris Knowings as Omar, a worker at the Corn Dog House that Kevin and Vanessa visit. (Delivery Guy)
- Ali Landry as Lisa, a vivacious single woman whom Kevin meets at the airport on the way to Florida ("Flight or Fight")
- Ralph Macchio as Alviti, a real-estate investor who wants to buy Enzo's and turn the property into a parking lot ("The Smoking Bun", "Phat Monkey")
- Chris Rock as Dennis, a member of Kevin's old band Smokefish ("A Band Done")
- Mike DelGuidice as Ronnie, a member of Kevin's old band Smokefish ("A Band Done")
- Sal Governale as Lance Grafton, a music manager ("A Band Done")

Several members of James' family appear in the series (in addition to James' brother and regular cast member Gary Valentine); his wife Steffiana De La Cruz appears in "The Back Out" and daughters Shea and Sienna James appear in various roles throughout both seasons. Remini's husband Angelo Pagán appears in "Business Unusual". Theme-song performer Mike DelGuidice and writer Mike Soccio have also appeared in the series in minor roles.

== Episodes ==
=== Series overview ===
Season	Episodes	Originally released	
Season	Episodes	First released	Last released
1	24	September 19, 2016	May 8, 2017
2	24	September 25, 2017	May 7, 2018

=== Season 1 (2016–17) ===
No. overall	No. in season	Title	Directed by	Written by	Original release date	Prod. code	U.S. viewers (millions)
1	1	"Pilot"	Andy Fickman	Kevin James & Bruce Helford & Rock Reuben	September 19, 2016	KCW100	11.08
Kevin Gable, a newly retired police officer living with his wife Donna and their three children, is looking forward to raucous adventures with his fellow retired cop friends. But things take a turn when his college-age daughter Kendra announces she's quitting school to work and support her nerdy boyfriend Chale, who claims to be developing an app that will make them rich.
2	2	"Sleep Disorder"	Andy Fickman	Michael Loftus	September 26, 2016	KCW102	10.62
Now that he's home all the time, Kevin starts noticing Donna has moved a lot of things around to her own advantage and that most of his favorite stuff is in the attic. He confronts her, and she lets him move one thing back while agreeing they will always discuss changes together moving forward. Kevin thinks he's won, but his friends convince him Donna just threw him a bone and that nothing will change. Elsewhere, Kendra tries to get Chale to act tougher, but her schemes backfire.
3	3	"Chore Weasel"	Andy Fickman	Mike Soccio	October 3, 2016	KCW104	9.60
Kevin agrees to stay home in the afternoon to wait for the delivery of Donna's armoire, but he instead hires a rep from Chore Weasel to do it for him so he can play football with the guys. Although he must now hide the Chore Weasel expenses and his football injury from Donna, Kevin can't resist calling Chore Weasel for other projects. Unfortunately for Kevin, Chale catches him in the act and struggles to keep his secret.
4	4	"Kevin and Donna's Book Club"	Andy Fickman	Heather Flanders	October 10, 2016	KCW101	8.70
When the guys can't agree on a bonding activity, Kevin joins Donna's all-female book club. He is initially a hit with the ladies, but quickly wears out his welcome.
5	5	"Kevin's Good Story"	Andy Fickman	Peter Hoare	October 17, 2016	KCW105	8.54
While Kevin and Donna are dining on their wedding anniversary with Goody and his wife Didi, Donna relates a story about one of Kevin's heroic deeds as a cop from six years ago. Goody realizes Kevin has stolen his hero story and passed it off as his own, but neither man can come clean; Kevin used the story as an excuse for forgetting his anniversary six years ago, while Goody urged Kevin to never mention the incident for fear that Didi would make him quit the police force.
6	6	"Beat the Parents"	Andy Fickman	John Cochran	October 24, 2016	KCW106	7.91
Kevin and Donna help Jack meet a new friend, Graydon, and are thrilled when the boys hit it off... that is, until they meet Graydon's irritating parents, Vic (Ray Romano) and Brandi (Lindsey Broad). Kevin and Donna then have to decide if they will sabotage the boys' friendship.
7	7	"Hallow-We-Ain't-Home"	Andy Fickman	Bruce Helford	October 31, 2016	KCW108	6.42
When Donna says she is wiped out after a hard day and doesn't feel like giving out Halloween candy, Kevin convinces her they should turn off the lights and pretend they aren't home. Their plan backfires, however, when they are lured outside by an angry neighbor couple and their kids. Meanwhile, Kendra and Chale take Sara and Jack to a trunk-o-ween event, where people give out candy from their car trunks.
8	8	"Who's Better than Us?"	Andy Fickman	Peter Hoare & John Cochran	November 7, 2016	KCW107	7.41
Kevin runs into his old partner Jimmy (Adam Sandler), and becomes annoyed when Jimmy's new partner Nick (Chris Weidman) says Jimmy hasn't told him any stories about riding with Kevin. Kevin's spirits are lifted some when Jimmy invites him to a ceremony at the church, where he plans to honor someone "very special" in his life. The ceremony turns out to be for the seemingly perfect Nick, with Jimmy telling Kevin he invited him as payback for never keeping in touch with him since he retired.
9	9	"The Power of Positive Drinking"	Andy Fickman	Heather Flanders & John Cochran	November 14, 2016	KCW109	7.06
When Kevin takes a job as a bartender at Enzo's, he starts dispensing unsolicited advice to his customers and fancies himself a "life coach", until it becomes apparent that his advice wasn't very helpful.
10	10	"The Fantastic Pho"	Andy Fickman	Michael Loftus & Mike Soccio	November 21, 2016	KCW110	6.97
Kevin quits another job because he can't stand taking orders from someone way younger than him. While telling Donna over a meal at a Vietnamese restaurant, Kevin has some pho and finds it delicious. He then decides he will be his own boss and sell pho from a food truck, but first he needs to convince some investors (Goody, Duffy, Mott and Kyle) to go along with the idea.
11	11	"Kevin's Bringing Supper Back"	Andy Fickman	Joanna Quraishi	December 5, 2016	KCW103	7.14
Kevin has become irritated by the lack of his family's closeness: Kendra and Sara are constantly at each other's throats, Jack is ignoring his family, and Donna has been working overtime and attempting to ignore everyone. Kevin imitates family bonding time, but the attempt gets off on a rocky start: board game night is ruined by Sara and Kendra fighting; and a soccer game where everyone wears a body bubble ends up with Jack going to the hospital. A dinner is almost ruined by Kendra and Sara arguing, but Kevin lays down his foot and makes the two reconcile. But, when the guys get him surprise concert tickets to see Billy Joel, he then has to decide if he will ditch his family.
12	12	"I'll Be Home for Christmas...Maybe"	Andy Fickman	Pete Correale	December 12, 2016	KCW111	7.31
When Mott's wife gets snowed in at a casino and Mott has to work, Kevin is put in charge of the couple's seven children for a few days and takes on an "unappreciated wife" role. Meanwhile, a lonely Kyle takes care of some things on Kevin's Christmas to-do list and impresses Donna with his diligence.
13	13	"Ring Worm"	Andy Fickman	Rock Reuben	January 2, 2017	KCW112	7.36
Kendra wonders why Chale is going out at night without telling her, and Chale confesses to Kevin that he got a job so he can buy Kendra an engagement ring. This reminds Kevin that he promised Donna many years ago to upgrade her ring when they could afford it. To keep it a surprise, Kevin then has to come up with a cover story to explain the $6,000 he moved from his and Donna's retirement account into their checking account.
14	14	"Kevin vs. The Dutch Elm"	Andy Fickman	Michael Loftus	January 16, 2017	KCW113	8.66
Donna pushes Kevin to make good on his promise to move the backyard pool, which has a dying tree casting shade over it during the summer. Kevin convinces Donna it would be easier to cut down the tree, but there are complications: the tree is on their neighbors' property and Kendra insists they first remove a family of squirrels living in the tree.
15	15	"Choke Doubt"	Andy Fickman	Mike Soccio	January 23, 2017	KCW114	8.62
Kevin saves Bill (Adam Ferrara), a man at the bar, from choking. A thankful Bill wants to make a big deal out of it, but Kevin refuses, saying that he's an ex-cop and is glad to help. Just then, Kyle appears on TV, being lauded as a hero after saving a cat from a fire, making Kevin rethink his modesty. Meanwhile, Donna's friend is starting a wedding planning business and offers to plan Kendra's and Chale's wedding for free to get her name out there. During the meeting, however, Donna and Chale clash over opposing ideas.
16	16	"The Back Out"	Andy Fickman	Kevin James & Rock Reuben	February 6, 2017	KCW115	7.91
Kevin is reluctant when Donna wants to become friends with Jackie (Ilana Becker) and Peter (Craig Bierko), a couple from church. He changes his tune when he learns that Peter is a chiropractor who works on some New York Mets players, and he offers Kevin and Donna a chance to stay at his condo in Florida during spring training. The trip is put in jeopardy, however, when Peter gives Kevin a free back adjustment and does a horrible job. Elsewhere, Kyle makes a pitch to be Chale's best man, even though he hardly knows him.
17	17	"Unholy War"	Andy Fickman	Tony Sheehan	February 13, 2017	KCW116	7.85
After reluctantly settling on a date for Kendra's wedding, Kevin learns that his childhood nemesis, Terry Labasco (Kim Coates), is trying to reserve the church on the same day. As the two battle for Father Philip's (Jim Breuer) approval by becoming more involved in the church, Kevin's drive to secure the church for Kendra becomes an insatiable desire to get revenge on his old rival.
18	18	"Neighborhood Watch"	Andy Fickman	Alex Metz	February 20, 2017	KCW117	7.29
When the Gables' mailbox is smashed, Kevin organizes a neighborhood watch with Goody, Duffy and his neighbor Rootger (Bas Rutten). It's later revealed that Kevin concocted the crime to avoid hanging out with Stewart (Alexander Chaplin), the annoying husband of Donna's cousin Irene (Claire Coffee).
19	19	"Showroom Showdown"	Andy Fickman	Dan Staley	March 13, 2017	KCW118	6.79
When Kevin and Chale get jobs working with Rootger at an electronics store warehouse to help pay for the wedding, Chale's quick promotion to the sales floor kick-starts Kevin's competitive side. Meanwhile, Donna and Kendra desperately try to trim the wedding's guest list.
20	20	"Double Date"	Andy Fickman	Michael Loftus & Mike Soccio	March 20, 2017	KCW119	5.93
When Goody and Didi win an all-expenses paid weekend for four at a spa resort in a church raffle, the Gables assume they will be the other couple to go along with them, but Goody says they are taking the Motts instead. Irritated, Kevin and Donna look for other couple friends. After a mishap with finding a couple on a website, they invite Rootger and his girlfriend to the resort just so they can rub it in their other friends' faces.
21	21	"Kenny Can Wait"	Andy Fickman	Mike Soccio & Tony Sheehan	April 10, 2017	KCW120	6.04
In his new job as an Uber driver, Kevin picks up Harry Connick Jr. and impresses him so much that Harry asks him to be his regular driver. The only problem is: almost everything Kevin told Harry to impress him is a lie.
22	22	"Quiet Diet"	Andy Fickman	Pete Correale & Peter Hoare	April 17, 2017	KCW121	5.90
Kevin needs to get his cholesterol down so the premium on his life insurance doesn't go up and he can go to Mets fantasy camp. In the process of helping Kevin with a crash cleanse, Chale reveals an embarrassing secret about himself and a pair of oversized jeans.
23	23	"Sting of Queens: Part One"	Andy Fickman	Story by : Peter Hoare & Pete Correale; Teleplay by : Mike Soccio & Michael Loftus	May 1, 2017	KCW122	6.26
Kevin is asked to come out of retirement and pretend to be the husband of Detective Vanessa Cellucci (Leah Remini, in her first appearance) in an important case, but he faces a dilemma when the case interferes with his trip to Mets fantasy camp. Meanwhile, Chale gets a high-paying job at a tech start-up company.
24	24	"Sting of Queens: Part Two"	Andy Fickman	Story by : Annie Levine & Jonathan Emerson; Teleplay by : Rock Reuben & Tony Sheehan	May 8, 2017	KCW123	5.68
Kevin and Vanessa go to a hotel to try and corner a phony art dealer, and stumble onto a much bigger crime. They eventually crack the case, but not without the aid of an undercover FBI agent. Elsewhere, Donna gets passed over for a promotion at the school, then tells off her boss and quits, while Chale discovers the tech start-up he's just joined is about to go belly-up.

=== Season 2 (2017–18) ===
No. overall	No. in season	Title	Directed by	Written by	Original release date	Prod. code	U.S. viewers (millions)
25	1	"Civil Ceremony"	Andy Fickman	Michael Loftus & Pete Correale & Peter Hoare	September 25, 2017	KCW201	10.26
At the beginning it is casually mentioned about Donna that "it's been over a year since she died". Next Chale is notified that his visa has expired and that he faces deportation. Although Vanessa sets up a meeting at INS with one of her exes, Kevin blows the meeting, forcing a last-minute wedding for Kendra and Chale. However, issues arise when Kevin tracks down Father Philip to a Civil War battle reenactment and Chale is hospitalized with appendicitis. In the end, Kendra and Chale are finally married at the hospital chapel and have their reception at the reenactment.
26	2	"Business Unusual"	Andy Fickman	Annie Levine & Jonathan Emerson & Mike Soccio	October 2, 2017	KCW202	6.65
Kendra asks Vanessa to get Kevin a job, without his knowledge, to stop his helicopter parenting. Vanessa initially presents Kevin a case for her security agency — serving divorce papers to the elusive Anthony Beyer (Angelo Pagán, Leah Remini's real-life husband) — as a "one-day thing", but Kevin soon decides its time to go back to work. He applies at the company, only to find that Vanessa is the owner. Kevin refuses to have a "pity" job, and decides to go for a guy's night out, something else he has not done since Donna's death. With some new information (Kevin figured out the logo on Anthony's shirt, while Vanessa just called his wife), Kevin and Vanessa successfully finish the job — and ride a scary ride. Meanwhile, Kyle obsesses over Kevin's suspicious injury story.
27	3	"Kevin Goes Nuts"	Andy Fickman	Rock Reuben & Heather MacGillvray & Linda Mathious	October 9, 2017	KCW203	6.01
Vanessa tells a clueless Kevin that Sara's behavior indicates she has a boyfriend. This is confirmed when Vanessa uncovers Sara's secret second Facebook account. Kevin sneaks off from work to investigate, forcing Vanessa to go after him. Meanwhile, kids at school find out Jack has been lying about having a peanut allergy to sit with them at lunch, so he desperately searches for a new "illness" he can claim.
28	4	"Plus One is the Loneliest Number"	Andy Fickman	Tom Anderson & Avin Das	October 16, 2017	KCW204	5.96
When Kevin catches Vanessa's new boyfriend Trent kissing another woman, she's forced to go to her baby sister's wedding alone. But Kevin surprises Vanessa by crashing the wedding and pretending to be Trent, helping her save face with her father Vincent (Chazz Palminteri). Meanwhile, Kendra runs into her high school frenemy Noreen (Kristolyn Lloyd) at Enzo's, and hears about the exotic places the also-married Noreen went on her honeymoon. With help from Kyle and Photoshop, Kendra and a reluctant Chale create a fake honeymoon for Instagram.
29	5	"Grief Thief"	Andy Fickman	Mike Soccio & Heather MacGillvray & Linda Mathious	October 23, 2017	KCW205	6.11
Kyle goes to a Parents Without Spouses grief counseling session to see if it will help Kevin, but after meeting a widow who is interested in him, he lies and assumes Kevin's life. Kevin is upset when he hears about it, but he soon uses the grief group as an excuse to ditch a Sunday job with Vanessa and attend a Jets football game with Goody. Meanwhile, Chale is having trouble getting any sleep due to Kendra's aggressive cuddling.
30	6	"The Owl"	Andy Fickman	Phoef Sutton & Mark Jordan Legan	October 30, 2017	KCW206	6.35
Kevin and Chale go to great lengths to retrieve an owl cookie jar that Kevin had sold to Goody, not knowing it has sentimental value to Kendra. The two make a trip to Utica after learning that Goody gave the jar to his cousin, who subsequently pawned it there, only to find the sassy pawnshop owner, Yvette (Loni Love), driving a hard bargain after their earlier encounter at a bar. Meanwhile, Vanessa is tired of Kyle flirting with her, so she tries to help his love life by creating a fake dating profile using a photo of her hairdresser while letting him down easy by saying that she moved to Australia. However, the plan backfires when Kyle recognizes the woman at Enzo's.
31	7	"The Kevin Crown Affair"	Andy Fickman	Michael Loftus & Pete Correale & Peter Hoare	November 6, 2017	KCW207	6.31
Kevin and Vanessa visit a potential new client, a toy store chain notable for its popular commercial with a "Prince of Toys". Kevin takes a pill that Rootger suggests will help him focus. However, Kevin screws up the interview, and both he and Vanessa secretly try to go back to change the client's mind. Meanwhile, with his unexpected success in implementing an electronic ordering system at Enzo's and his continued failure in launching his app that feeds goldfish, Chale wants to quit working on his app to work at Enzo's full-time as his manager. Kendra forces Kyle to talk to Chale and convince him otherwise, but the conversation backfires as Chale inspires Kyle to get his old band back together.
32	8	"Slip 'n' Fall"	Andy Fickman	Dan Staley & Tom Anderson	November 13, 2017	KCW210	6.15
After Kevin spills fondue at the office, Rootger slips in it and falls, requiring the latter to take a trip to the hospital and wear a neckbrace. Kevin and Vanessa both worry that Rutger will sue them, when Vanessa reveals that she hasn't yet purchased liability company insurance (due to her dumping a State Farm agent). To make matters worse, they find out Rootger has been seeing a lawyer for an unknown, yet suspicious reason. Meanwhile, Kendra gives some legal advice to Mott and he thanks her with a $20 tip. This inspires Chale and Kyle to sell Kendra's services, even though she is technically not yet a lawyer.
33	9	"Cooking Up a Storm"	Andy Fickman	Dan Staley & Annie Levine & Jonathan Emerson	November 20, 2017	KCW209	6.09
Kevin vows to make a home-cooked Thanksgiving meal for the family, but when he finds it impossible, he relies on neighbor Wendy (Florencia Lozano) who is always bringing him food. Vanessa correctly deduces that Wendy has been bringing meals to Kevin because she's romantically interested in him and wants Kevin to end the relationship. Meanwhile, Jack has been stocking supplies because he's read that Yellowstone sits on an active volcano that could blow anytime, causing chaos throughout the country, and Sara wants to cook the cornbread Donna had taught her to make before her death.
34	10	"Kevin Moves Metal"	Andy Fickman	Peter Hoare & Pete Correale	November 27, 2017	KCW208	6.35
A Monkey Fist client suspects that her ex-husband, a car dealer, is falsifying his income to pay less alimony, so Kevin goes undercover as a janitor to try and get a hold of the dealer's books. After inadvertently convincing a couple to buy a vehicle, Kevin is immediately promoted to salesman. He is soon distracted by his incentive to win the dealer's Vespa by selling the most cars, which prompts Vanessa to go undercover herself to make sure he doesn't screw up the job. Meanwhile, Chale helps train Jack to be a better actor as the latter prepares to try out for a school play, only to overdo it.
35	11	"Trainer Wreck"	Andy Fickman	Annie Levine & Jonathan Emerson	December 11, 2017	KCW211	6.31
A new gym has opened up downstairs, and Kevin and Vanessa both vie for the attention of handsome new trainer Alejandro (Eduardo Verástegui) for very different reasons, putting the partners at odds. Meanwhile, Kyle provides bad advice to Chale when a health inspector visits the restaurant with Enzo out of town.
36	12	"The Might've Before Christmas"	Andy Fickman	Rock Reuben & Mike Soccio	December 18, 2017	KCW212	6.40
At the Gable family Christmas Eve gathering, Vanessa arrives and tells the story of her and Kevin's first day as partners on the force. As the story evolves, the kids realize it was also the day Kevin asked out Donna for the first time. Meanwhile, Kendra is mad that Kevin got a cheap present for Chale, while Kyle is upset that Kevin did not get a present for him (even though it was Kyle's idea to not exchange gifts).
37	13	"Monkey Fist Insecurity"	Andy Fickman	Pete Correale & Avin Das	January 15, 2018	KCW215	7.21
Kevin and Vanessa lose a major contract to Nassau Security, another group of ex-cops who wear snappy uniforms and have more advanced gear. After Nassau continues to swoop in and steal clients that Monkey Fist had lined up, Rootger helps Kevin discover the reason why their rivals always seem to be one step ahead.
38	14	"Kevin Can Date"	Andy Fickman	Linda Mathious & Heather MacGillvray	January 22, 2018	KCW216	7.37
While Vanessa meets with her client Rebecca Romero (Zulay Henao), who wants Monkey Fist to serve her ex-boyfriend with a restraining order, the client tells her she thinks Kevin is funny and confident. Vanessa sets up Kevin with his first date since Donna passed, but while Kevin is locked in an escape room with Rebecca, he gets news that several of Rebecca's exes have taken out restraining orders on her.
39	15	"Fight or Flight"	Andy Fickman	Annie Levine & Jonathan Emerson	January 29, 2018	KCW213	7.28
Vanessa, Kevin and Rutger are going on a business trip to Florida, with Kevin taking the family along for a Disney World vacation while there. To get an upgrade to two open first class seats, Vanessa lies and says she and Kevin are married. This backfires for Kevin when he meets a woman named Lisa (Ali Landry) and the two hit it off. Meanwhile, Rootger tries to get over his fear of flying, and Malcolm (Jason Kravits), a passenger sitting with Chale and Kendra, causes the two to get into an argument.
40	16	"40 Under 40"	Andy Fickman	Mike Soccio & Heather MacGillvray & Linda Mathious	February 5, 2018	KCW214	6.95
Vanessa gets interviewed for an article in Long Island Insider magazine highlighting 40 business owners under 40. Upset that she left him out of the interview, Kevin reminds Vanessa that she is over 45. Vanessa counters that she only lied to get Monkey Fist some free publicity. Kevin then scares Vanessa about the bright lights on the award ceremony stage outing her true age, causing her to go overboard on facial surgery. Elsewhere, Chale and Kendra set up Kyle on a date with Chale's crazy Aunt Tracy (Geraldine Hughes), who is in town. Kyle insists he can handle any woman, but he turns out to be very wrong
41	17	"Wingmen"	Andy Fickman	Rock Reuben	February 26, 2018	KCW217	6.09
At Kyle's urging, Kevin and Vanessa use a dating app called "Be My Wingman", in which a friend chooses a match for another friend. Vanessa finds a seemingly perfect match for Kevin, while Kevin finds Vanessa a perfect match... for himself.
42	18	"The Whole Enchilada"	Andy Fickman	Dan Staley & Tom Anderson	March 5, 2018	KCW218	6.31
Kevin's neighbor Wendy, who has been bringing him delicious meals ever since Donna died, demands more from their relationship than just her cooking and Kevin eating. Kevin tries to indulge her and, after realizing he still has no romantic feelings for her, has to decide if he should officially break things off or continue leading Wendy on to enjoy her food.
43	19	"Delivery Guy"	Andy Fickman	Alex Metz	March 19, 2018	KCW219	5.67
With Monkey Fist Security desperate for publicity after a new Nassau Security ad runs on TV, Kevin is approached by Anthony (Lorenzo James Henrie), a young man who says Kevin delivered him 20 years ago when his mother was in labor. Chale convinces Kevin and Anthony to go on a local morning show that is running an episode on hero cops. The segment doesn't go well, and Kevin is later upstaged by Frank from Nassau, who has just donated a kidney to a young woman.
44	20	"Forty Seven Candles"	Andy Fickman	Mike Soccio	March 26, 2018	KCW224	5.68
When Vanessa says she doesn't want Kevin and the crew to do anything special for her birthday, Kevin is sure she is lying and plans a surprise party. Things get complicated when Vanessa has a change of heart and decides to throw a party for herself. Kevin manages to thwart that plan, but soon has another problem: he's counting on Kyle to get Vanessa to the surprise party location.
45	21	"The Smoking Bun"	Andy Fickman	Mike Soccio & Heather MacGillvray & Linda Mathious	April 9, 2018	KCW220	5.75
After Enzo tells the gang he is selling the restaurant and moving to Florida, Kevin and Vanessa go see the new buyer of the property Alviti (Ralph Macchio) to try and convince him to keep the business as is. When Alviti instead wants to tear down the building, Kevin pitches the city council to get the building declared an historic landmark, but that doesn't work because Alviti has bribed the council. Kevin and Vanessa then promise Alviti they will fully investigate him, but instead succumb when he bribes them with a lucrative security contract.
46	22	"Phat Monkey"	Andy Fickman	Rock Reuben & Annie Levine & Jonathan Emerson	April 16, 2018	KCW223	5.26
With Monkey Fist landing the huge account for Alviti's parking lots, Kevin hires a personal assistant named Tyler (Jay Klaitz) without telling Vanessa. This upsets Rootger, so Kevin decides to have him and Tyler compete for the job. Distracted, Kevin neglects an assignment at one of Alviti's lots, forcing Vanessa to beg for Alviti's mercy. Elsewhere, Chale has developed a business plan to buy Enzo's and turn it into a more modern pizzeria, only to find that he and Kendra cannot come up with the down payment.
47	23	"Brew Ha Ha"	Andy Fickman	Dan Staley & Tom Anderson	April 30, 2018	KCW221	4.98
Kendra and Chale get a surprise when Kevin announces he's taken out a second mortgage and is giving them $80,000 for a down payment on buying Enzo's. But things unravel when Kevin insists they run the restaurant his way, and won't listen to any of Kendra's and Chale's ideas. Kendra tells her dad to forget the whole thing and announces that she and Chale are moving out of the garage. Kevin then gets mad at Vanessa when he learns the kids are staying with her. Just before Enzo's deadline, father and daughter reconcile, allowing Kendra and Chale to buy the property.
48	24	"A Band Done"	Andy Fickman	Michael Loftus	May 7, 2018	KCW222	5.45
Kevin's former partner Jimmy convinces him they should get their old band Smokefish back together, along with the two other original members (played by Chris Rock and Mike DelGuidice). Jimmy gets them a meeting with a booking agent, who says he must see them play first. Kevin then uses his loan to guilt trip Kendra and Chale into letting Smokefish play at Enzo's. Meanwhile, Vanessa comes to realize that a chance encounter with Smokefish many years ago may have changed the course of her life.

== Production ==
=== Development ===
In October 2015, it was announced that Kevin James would star in a new family-comedy television series for CBS, with Rock Reuben as executive producer and Bruce Helford serving as showrunner. On May 12, 2016, CBS placed an order for the series.

The show premiered during the 2016–17 network television schedule, airing at 8:00 p.m. On October 17, 2016, CBS ordered a full season of 22 episodes. In November 2016, Helford exited the series after the first 13 episodes due to creative differences. Rob Long, a Cheers alum, took over as showrunner. On January 6, 2017, two additional episodes were ordered, bringing the total to 24 episodes for the first season.

The series was filmed entirely on Long Island at Gold Coast Studios in Bethpage, New York. The pilot episode was filmed on April 1, 2016, with production for subsequent episodes beginning on August 5, 2016.

On March 23, 2017, CBS renewed the series for a second season, which premiered on September 25, 2017, and concluded on May 7, 2018. The initial order for Season 2 was 22 episodes, which was later increased to 24 episodes.

=== Casting ===
In January 2016, Taylor Spreitler was cast as Kendra. In February 2016, additional cast members were announced, including Ryan Cartwright, Mary-Charles Jones, James DiGiacomo, Leonard Earl Howze, and Erinn Hayes. In March 2016, Lenny Venito and Gary Valentine joined the cast.

In September 2016, it was revealed that Ray Romano and Gina Brillon would appear as guest stars on the show. In November 2016, Adam Sandler was also confirmed to guest-star. In March 2017, it was announced that Leah Remini, who had starred alongside James in The King of Queens, would guest-star in the final two episodes of the first season.

In June 2017, Remini was promoted to series regular starting with Season 2. Shortly after, it was announced that Erinn Hayes would not return for the second season. According to a report in Variety, sources confirmed that Remini would reprise her role as Detective Vanessa Cellucci, the character she had played in the first-season finale. Hayes' departure was attributed to creative reasons and "not a reflection" of her performance. In August 2017, it was revealed that Hayes' character would be written off by being killed before the start of Season 2, with the new season set to take place seven to ten months after the events of Season 1 to accommodate Remini's character.

=== Cancellation ===
On May 12, 2018, it was announced that CBS had officially canceled Kevin Can Wait after two seasons due to declining ratings, the network's desire to have an ownership stake, and the need to clear space for three new sitcoms in the Fall 2018 schedule.

== Reception ==
=== Critical response ===
During its first season, Kevin Can Wait received mixed-to-negative reviews from critics. On the review aggregator review aggregator Rotten Tomatoes, the series holds an approval rating of 30%, based on 23 reviews, with an average rating of 3.9/10. The site's critical consensus reads, "Kevin James proves a likable, funny lead, but Kevin Can Wait relies too heavily on predictable, unfunny jokes and a series of lackluster subplots to stand out from the crowd." On Metacritic, the series has a score of 39 out of 100, based on 17 critics, indicating "generally unfavorable reviews".

The retooling of the series in Season 2, which involved the firing of Erinn Hayes and the addition of Leah Remini, also garnered negative reviews. Critics compared the revamped show unfavorably to James and Remini's previous series, The King of Queens, assessing it as an inferior imitation.

=== Donna Gable's death ===
The replacement of Erinn Hayes with Leah Remini and the way the show handled the death of Hayes' character, Donna Gable, became a source of controversy for Kevin Can Wait. Criticism was particularly directed at the episodes "Civil Ceremony" and "Grief Thief". In the Season 2 premiere, "Civil Ceremony", Donna's death is briefly mentioned through a piece of mail, followed by a joke that many viewers found distasteful. In the episode "Grief Thief", the characters use a single-parents' support group to avoid work and meet potential romantic partners, which also received backlash. Additionally, the show's sparse mention of Donna after her death, the cause of which is never explained, has been another point of contention.

Viewers and critics were divided over the show's retooling. Some appreciated the change, feeling that the chemistry between Kevin James and Leah Remini improved the series, while others believed that the firing of Hayes, the introduction of Remini, and the handling of Donna's death, along with weak scriptwriting, lowered the show's quality. Despite the controversy, both Hayes and Remini spoke positively of each other, with Remini stating that she had been looking forward to working with Hayes, and Hayes asking fans not to place blame on Remini for her firing.

There were rumors that the addition of Remini was an attempt to save the show from cancellation by capitalizing on the successful chemistry between James and Remini from their time on The King of Queens. However, James insisted the decision was purely creative, as the writers felt they were running out of ideas for the original concept and that he was unsure if the show would continue beyond a second season. He also revealed that the original concept of the show involved him as a single father, but the producers had initially given him a wife instead.

Despite the controversy, the show's ratings remained steady. As of December 1, 2017, Kevin Can Wait was averaging 8.2 million viewers (with delayed viewing) in the second season, competing against more established shows like Dancing with the Stars and The Voice. The series also performed well in the coveted 18-49 demographic, ranking as the fifth-highest rated CBS program in that category.

In 2022, Hayes was cast in AMC's dramedy Kevin Can F**k Himself, a show loosely inspired by her dismissal from Kevin Can Wait.

=== Ratings ===
==== Overall ====
Viewership and ratings per season of Kevin Can Wait
Season	Timeslot (ET)	Episodes	First aired		Last aired		TV season	Viewership rank	Avg. viewers (millions)	18–49 rank	Avg. 18–49 rating
Season	Timeslot (ET)	Episodes	Date	Viewers (millions)	Date	Viewers (millions)	TV season	Viewership rank	Avg. viewers (millions)	18–49 rank	Avg. 18–49 rating
1	Monday 8:30 PM (1–5); Monday 8:00 PM (6–24)	24	September 19, 2016	11.08	May 8, 2017	5.68	2016–17	32	9.24	TBD	2.1
2	Monday 9:00 PM (1–5); Monday 8:00 PM (6–24)	24	September 25, 2017	10.26	May 7, 2018	5.45	2017–18	51	7.66	TBD	1.6

==== Season 1 ====
Viewership and ratings per episode of Kevin Can Wait
No.	Title	Air date	Rating/share (18–49)	Viewers (millions)	DVR (18–49)	Total (18–49)
1	"Pilot"	September 19, 2016	2.6/9	11.08	0.9	3.5
2	"Sleep Disorder"	September 26, 2016	2.7/8	10.62	0.9	3.6
3	"Chore Weasel"	October 3, 2016	2.2/8	9.60	0.8	3.0
4	"Kevin and Donna's Book Club"	October 10, 2016	2.1/7	8.70	0.8	2.9
5	"Kevin's Good Story"	October 17, 2016	2.1/7	8.54	0.7	2.8
6	"Beat the Parents"	October 24, 2016	1.7/6	7.91	—N/a	—N/a
7	"Hallow-We-Ain't-Home"	October 31, 2016	1.3/5	6.42	0.6	1.9
8	"Who's Better than Us?"	November 7, 2016	1.7/6	7.41	—N/a	—N/a
9	"The Power of Positive Drinking"	November 14, 2016	1.6/5	7.06	—N/a	—N/a
10	"The Fantastic Pho"	November 21, 2016	1.5/5	6.97	0.5	2.0
11	"Kevin's Bringing Supper Back"	December 5, 2016	1.5/5	7.14	—N/a	—N/a
12	"I'll Be Home for Christmas...Maybe"	December 12, 2016	1.4/5	7.31	0.6	2.0
13	"Ring Worm"	January 2, 2017	1.4/5	7.36	—N/a	—N/a
14	"Kevin vs. The Dutch Elm"	January 16, 2017	1.7/6	8.66	—N/a	—N/a
15	"Choke Doubt"	January 23, 2017	1.7/6	8.62	0.6	2.3
16	"The Back Out"	February 6, 2017	1.5/5	7.91	—N/a	—N/a
17	"Unholy War"	February 13, 2017	1.5/6	7.85	—N/a	—N/a
18	"Neighborhood Watch"	February 20, 2017	1.4/5	7.29	—N/a	—N/a
19	"Showroom Showdown"	March 13, 2017	1.3/5	6.79	—N/a	—N/a
20	"Double Date"	March 20, 2017	1.1/4	5.93	—N/a	—N/a
21	"Kenny Can Wait"	April 10, 2017	1.2/5	6.04	—N/a	—N/a
22	"Quiet Diet"	April 17, 2017	1.1/4	5.90	—N/a	—N/a
23	"Sting of Queens: Part One"	May 1, 2017	1.2/5	6.26	—N/a	—N/a
24	"Sting of Queens: Part Two"	May 8, 2017	1.1/5	5.68	—N/a	—N/a

==== Season 2 ====
Viewership and ratings per episode of Kevin Can Wait
No.	Title	Air date	Rating/share (18–49)	Viewers (millions)	DVR (18–49)	Total (18–49)
1	"Civil Ceremony"	September 25, 2017	2.3/8	10.26	TBD	TBD
2	"Business Unusual"	October 2, 2017	1.3/5	6.65	TBD	TBD
3	"Kevin Goes Nuts"	October 9, 2017	1.2/4	6.01	TBD	TBD
4	"Plus One is the Loneliest Number"	October 16, 2017	1.1/4	5.96	TBD	TBD
5	"Grief Thief"	October 23, 2017	1.2/4	6.11	TBD	TBD
6	"The Owl"	October 30, 2017	1.2/5	6.35	TBD	TBD
7	"The Kevin Crown Affair"	November 6, 2017	1.2/5	6.31	TBD	TBD
8	"Slip 'n' Fall"	November 13, 2017	1.3/5	6.15	TBD	TBD
9	"Cooking Up a Storm"	November 20, 2017	1.2/5	6.09	TBD	TBD
10	"Kevin Moves Metal"	November 27, 2017	1.2/5	6.35	TBD	TBD
11	"Trainer Wreck"	December 11, 2017	1.1/4	6.31	TBD	TBD
12	"The Might've Before Christmas"	December 18, 2017	1.1/4	6.40	TBD	TBD
13	"Monkey Fist Insecurity"	January 15, 2018	1.3/5	7.21	TBD	TBD
14	"Kevin Can Date"	January 22, 2018	1.3/5	7.37	TBD	TBD
15	"Fight or Flight"	January 29, 2018	1.2/5	7.28	TBD	TBD
16	"40 Under 40"	February 5, 2018	1.2/5	6.95	TBD	TBD
17	"Wingmen"	February 26, 2018	1.1/4	6.09	TBD	TBD
18	"The Whole Enchilada"	March 5, 2018	1.1/4	6.31	TBD	TBD
19	"Delivery Guy"	March 19, 2018	1.0/4	5.67	TBD	TBD
20	"Forty Seven Candles"	March 26, 2018	0.9/4	5.68	TBD	TBD
21	"The Smoking Bun"	April 9, 2018	1.0/4	5.75	TBD	TBD
22	"Phat Monkey"	April 16, 2018	0.9/4	5.26	TBD	TBD
23	"Brew Ha Ha"	April 30, 2018	0.8/3	4.98	TBD	TBD
24	"A Band Done"	May 7, 2018	1.0/4	5.45	TBD	TBD

== Awards ==
Kevin James received a nomination for Favorite Actor in a New TV Series at the 43rd People's Choice Awards in 2017.

== Home media ==
The complete first season of Kevin Can Wait was released on DVD by Sony Pictures Home Entertainment on September 5, 2017, while the second season was released in Australia by Shock on May 8, 2019.

== See also ==
- Heaven Can Wait, the phrase to which the title of the sitcom alludes
- Man with a Plan, another CBS sitcom often compared to and partnered with Kevin Can Wait
- 8 Simple Rules, a sitcom also compared to Kevin Can Wait
- Kevin Can F**k Himself, a dramedy inspired by the controversial firing of Hayes
