= Bobby Jack Brand =

Clothing brand

Bobby Jack
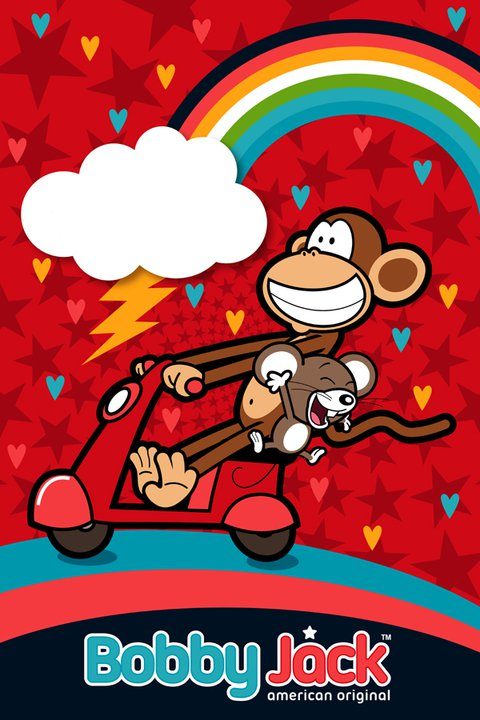
- Product type: Apparel, Backpacks, Bedding
- Current owner: J&F Design
- Country: United States and Canada
- Introduced: 2001; 25 years ago
- Website: bobbyjackbrand.com

Bobby Jack is a clothing brand featuring a monkey character of the same name. It was founded by Han Lee and Robert Molino in 2001. The clothing brand clothing was sold in clothing retailers such as JCPenney, Sears, and Macy's. The clothing and character became popular among children and teenagers because of its "snarky messages."

The characters portrayed on the clothing are Bobby Jack, a monkey with an attitude, Cooper, the best friend monkey, and Moose, his pet mouse. Bobby Jack merchandise is targeted primarily towards school-age (tween) girls. By 2006 Bobby Jack clothing became one of the most popular character brand among children and teens.

== See also ==
- It's Happy Bunny
