= Heaven Can Wait =

Heaven Can Wait may refer to:

- Heaven Can Wait (1943 film), a comedy based on the stage play Birthday by Leslie Bush-Fekete
- Heaven Can Wait (1978 film), an American football comedy starring Warren Beatty; a remake of the 1941 film Here Comes Mr. Jordan
- "Heaven Can Wait", a 1938 stage play by Harry Segall; basis for 1941 film Here Comes Mr. Jordan
- "Heaven Can Wait", a B-24 bomber lost in Hansa Bay during World War 2 and recovered in 2023

== Music ==
- Heaven Can Wait (Gamma Ray EP), 1990
- Heaven Can Wait (OPM EP), 2012
- Heaven Can Wait – The Best Ballads of Meat Loaf Vol. 1, a 1996 album
- "Heaven Can Wait" (Charlotte Gainsbourg song), 2010
- "Heaven Can Wait" (Michael Jackson song), 2001
- "Heaven Can Wait" (Sandra song), 1988
- "Heaven Can Wait", a song written by Jimmy Van Heusen and Eddie DeLange
- "Heaven Can Wait", a song by GPS
- "Heaven Can Wait", a song by Grave Digger from War Games
- "Heaven Can Wait", a song by Iron Maiden from Somewhere in Time
- "Heaven Can Wait", a song by LSD from LSD
- "Heaven Can Wait", a song by Meat Loaf from Bat Out of Hell
- "Heaven Can Wait", a song by We The Kings from Smile Kid

== See also ==
- Kevin Can Wait, an American sitcom television series
