= It's Happy Bunny =

Fictional character

Happy Bunny is a character in a series of stickers, buttons, greeting cards, posters, and other merchandise sold at novelty shops across North America. Designed by artist and writer Jim Benton in the 1990s, whom People Magazine called "the most visible cartoonist in America," Happy Bunny is a small, smiling bunny, often varying in color, with an insulting slogan printed at its feet. Happy Bunny gained popularity in 2001 after stores like Hot Topic and Spencers began selling its merchandise.

== Products ==
Happy Bunny products are sold in many forms such as clothing lines, note pads, key chains, computer mouse pads, energy drinks, school supplies, and many more. "Mr. Benton's intellectual properties ... have made him stand out in an industry dominated by big entertainment companies." "Last year, the It's Happy Bunny brand nabbed the International Licensing Excellence Award for Best Art Brand Licensing of the Year, from the Licensing Industry Merchandisers' Association (LIMA)." "An anti-drug campaign featuring It's Happy Bunny was honored at the 2007 Austin ADDY Awards for advertising excellence in the category of public service."

The appeal of the merchandise lies in the fact that most, if not all, of the slogans are apathetic and sometimes offensive and derogatory, and one commentator noted that "'It's Happy Bunny' has joined the "tasteless" category of merchandise ...". The slogans include, among others, "You suck and that's sad", "Cute but psycho: things even out", "Hi, Loser", "It worries me how dumb you are", "Dear Santa, leave presents. Take Brother!", and "I am the dominant bunny in the world" . It's Happy Bunny also has a line of "medicine" to cure quite awkward (fictional) diseases such as the "I'm delusional" pills; they are actually mints or small candies, the word poison badly blocked out with crayon (with happy bunny holding a crayon) and written in crayon there is, "mints for a frend" [sic].

In addition, Jim Benton has written It's Happy Bunny books including Life. Get One; Love Bites; What's Your Sign?; and The Good, The Bad, and the Bunny. These books are targeted towards teen audiences and are not intended to be children's books. An It's Happy Bunny Sudoku book has also been written by Jim Benton and Rafael Sirkis.

In 2006 the Partnership for a Drug-Free Texas commissioned Benton to create anti-recreational drug public service announcement messages featuring Happy Bunny.

== See also ==
- Bobby Jack Brand
