= Franny K. Stein =

Children's book series by Jim Benton

- Cover of book one Lunch Walks Among Us
- Lunch Walks Among Us; Attack Of The 50-Ft. Cupid; The Invisible Fran; The Fran That Time Forgot; Frantastic Voyage; The Fran With Four Brains; The Frandidate; Bad Hair Day; Recipe for Disaster; Mood Science
- Author: Jim Benton
- Cover artist: Jim Benton
- Country: United States
- Language: English
- Genre: Children's literature
- Publisher: Simon & Schuster
- Published: 2003 - 2021
- Media type: Print (paperback)
- No. of books: 10

Franny K. Stein is a children's book series by American author Jim Benton. The series was first published in 2003 with the entry Lunch Walks Among Us by Simon & Schuster. The titles of the series all play on book or film titles, such as Attack of the 50 Foot Woman and Fantastic Voyage.

== Synopsis ==
The Franny K. Stein series follows its titular character Franny, an elementary school girl that's ostracized from her classmates due to her strange behaviors and experiments. Throughout the series Franny is often called upon to battle various creatures or put into weird situations, sometimes ones that she herself contributed to either accidentally or deliberately.

== Film adaptation ==
In 2007, the film rights to the series were optioned by East of Doheny, with plans to create a series of animated films. No director or writer for the film has been announced and there have been no further announcements on the project since then.

== Reception ==
Critical reception for the series has been mostly positive, with the School Library Journal praising the series for being "age appropriate" and having an appeal to both boys and girls. Publishers Weekly has also given the series a positive rating, calling the first book a "copiously and cartoonishly illustrated novel". Kirkus Reviews gave an overall positive review but stated (with a degree of sarcasm) that it "isn't anything like a blatant grab for Captain Underpants fans, oh no".

=== Awards ===
- Gryphon Honor Award, 2004 (Lunch Walks Among Us)
- Golden Duck Award, 2006 (The Fran That Time Forgot)

== Books ==
No.	Title	Original publish date
1	"Lunch Walks Among Us"	1 September 2003
Franny K. Stein is a scientist and she prefers poison ivy to daisies and piranha to goldfish, and when Franny jumps rope, she uses her pet snake. This makes it almost impossible for Franny to make friends. Inspired by her favorite teacher, she undertakes one of the most difficult and dangerous experiments ever conceived, called "trying to fit in". Franny's experiment seems to be a tremendous success, and she is enjoying newfound popularity, until a freak garbage-pail incident creates a monster that only a mad scientist can defeat. This forces her to make a bold decision to solve a problem and change her life.
2	"Attack Of The 50-Ft. Cupid"	1 January 2004
Franny's mom says every mad scientist needs a lab assistant. Franny decides to get a lab assistant, but Igor isn't a pure lab, but rather a hybrid of several dog breeds such as poodle, Chihuahua, beagle, spaniel, and shepherd. Franny thinks what to do with Igor and considers not to have an assistant. Things get even worse when a giant, fifty-foot, arrow-shooting cupid starts causing trouble all over town, and this forces Franny to save the day.
3	"The Invisible Fran"	1 September 2004
Franny decides to help her classmates discover their own inner mad scientists. For her latest experiment, Franny needs a few volunteers, a half-completed two-headed robot, and an invisibility potion, but this experiment proves to be more difficult than she expected as her classmates don't know about a mad science and a dumb robot runs amok in a lab.
4	"The Fran That Time Forgot"	1 March 2005
Franny has invented broccoli that eats itself and a hamster-powered tricycle, but soon decides to change her middle name.
5	"Frantastic Voyage"	December 2005
Franny's faithful canine assistant swallows a doomsday device that is ready to go off at any moment. With her miniaturization machine, she shrinks herself and goes on a field trip through the body of a ticking time dog.
6	"The Fran With Four Brains"	26 December 2006
Being a mad scientist in the modern world is very hard work. With so much that needs to be done in such a short period of time, multitasking can get way out of hand. Franny soon decides to build a few real, live, steel-plated Franbots as her assistants.
7	"The Frandidate"	2 September 2008
Franny decides to create an experiment called Frandidate, a suit made from DNA samples of a dog, a chameleon, and a parrot, along with a piece of carpet, so she could gain people's votes. Her experiment says and does exactly what people want to hear, but soon her suit starts making promises she knows she won't be able to keep and Franny realizes she might have gone too far.
8	"Bad Hair Day"	23 July 2019
Franny K. Stein is not a fan of glamour, but Franny wonders if her mom wishes she were different. This gives her an idea and makes an experiment in which she turns the beauty products her mom loves into something more exciting. Every experiment has its own error, however, and when Franny's hair takes on a life of its own, Franny must save the day to finally realize that her mom loves her just the way she is.
9	"Recipe for Disaster"	21 July 2020
Franny K. Stein isn't a good baker, but when she sees that the fundraisers for the art and music departments at her school aren't making enough money, she decides to take matters into her own hands. Using her genius mind and kitchen, she sets out to create the most delicious muffin on Earth. Her sales are rising, but bad things then happen when people become changed after they taste her muffin.
10	"Mood Science"	31 August 2021
Franny K. Stein is fed up with the feelings that get in her way. She physically removes them with the help of one of her machines, but it turns out that not having feelings can make things even worse, and she accidentally releases a virus that is turning everybody into toads.
