= Jim Benton =

American illustrator and children's writer

- Born: October 31, 1960 (age 65)
- Education: Western Michigan University
- Occupations: Illustrator, author
- Spouse: Mary K. Hart
- Children: 2
- Website: http://www.jimbenton.com/

Jim K. Benton (born October 31, 1960) is an American illustrator and writer. He is best known for It's Happy Bunny, and has created several other properties, which include Dear Dumb Diary, Dog of Glee, Franny K. Stein, Just Jimmy, Just Plain Mean, Sweetypuss, The Misters, Meany Doodles, Vampy Doodles, Kissy Doodles, and the jOkObo project.

== Early life and education ==
Jim Benton was raised in Birmingham, Michigan, graduating from Seaholm High School in 1978. He studied fine arts at Western Michigan University.

== Career ==
Benton began his career in a Shirt shop where he started designing his own characters on T-shirts. At the same time, he did illustrations and artwork for magazines and newspapers. People magazine named him "one of the most visible cartoonists in America."

Benton also created greeting cards and worked in the magazine and publishing industry. In 1998, his SpyDogs characters became an animated series, The Secret Files of the Spy Dogs, that aired on Fox Kids. Licensing his own creations brought them widespread attention on products, such as It's Happy Bunny, which he created in the mid-1990s but licensed in 2002.

Benton lives in Birmingham, Michigan, where he operates out of his own studio. He is married with two children.

== Bibliography ==
=== It's Happy Bunny ===
- Love Bites (2004)
- Life. Get One (2005)
- What's Your Sign? (2006)
- The Good, The Bad, The Bunny (2006)
- It's Happy Bunny Nice Enough Poster Book (2007)

== Awards ==
- 2004: Gryphon Award honor book, Center for Children's Books, University of Illinois at Urbana-Champaign (Lunch Walks Among Us)
- 2005: LIMA International Licensing Award, Best Art Brand License (It's Happy Bunny)
- 2006: Eleanor Cameron Award, Golden Duck Award Committee (The Fran That Time Forgot)
- 2006: LIMA International Licensing Award, Best Character Brand License – Soft Goods (It's Happy Bunny)
- 2007: LIMA International Licensing Award, Best Character Brand License – Hard Goods (It's Happy Bunny)
- 2007: Austin ADDY Awards (with Partnership for a Drug-Free America, Texas Alliance)
  - Silver award, Public Service Campaign
  - Bronze award, Public Service postcard
- 2009: Nomination National Cartoonists Society Reuben Award, Book Illustration: Cherise The Niece
- 2011: National Cartoonists Society Reuben Award, Greeting Cards: It's Happy Bunny
- 2014: National Parenting Publications Awards GOLD MEDAL: The End (Almost)
- 2015: Eisner Award Nominee: Dog Butts and Love. And Stuff Like That. And Cats.
- 2023: Inkpot Award
