= Mary-Charles Jones =

American actress (born 2001)

- Born: December 28, 2001 (age 24); Seattle, Washington, U.S.
- Occupation: Actress
- Years active: 2007–present
- Relatives: Maggie Elizabeth Jones (sister)

Mary-Charles Jones (born December 28, 2001) is an American actress known for her roles as Sara Gable on Kevin Can Wait and Annabelle Peters on Naomi.

== Early life ==
Jones was born on December 28, 2001, in Seattle, Washington, and raised in Atlanta, Georgia. She has two younger sisters, Maggie and Lillian.

== Career ==
Jones began acting at four years old. After acting in commercials, her first acting appearance was on the pilot episode of October Road in 2007. From 2010 to 2011, she appeared as a younger version of Miley Stewart throughout the fourth season of Hannah Montana. With her sister Maggie, she also appeared in the films Footloose and Identity Thief. In 2013, she starred in the television film Dear Dumb Diary based on the popular book series of the same name.

From 2016 to 2018, Jones was cast as the middle child Sara Gable for the CBS sitcom Kevin Can Wait. The series was cancelled after two seasons. In 2021, Jones was cast in the role of Annabelle Peters for The CW superhero drama Naomi. The series aired from January to May 2022, before it was cancelled as a result of The CW changing ownership.

== Filmography ==
=== Film ===
| Year | Title | Role | Notes |
|---|---|---|---|
| 2010 | Father of Invention | Young Claire | |
| 2011 | Footloose | Sarah Warnicker | |
| 2013 | Identity Thief | Franny Patterson | |

=== Television ===
| Year | Title | Role | Notes |
|---|---|---|---|
| 2007 | October Road | Caitlin Rowan | Episode: "Pilot" |
| 2009 | Grey's Anatomy | Jessica | Episode: "Sweet Surrender" |
| 2010–11 | Hannah Montana | Young Miley | 3 episodes |
| 2012 | Necessary Roughness | Little Girl | Episodes: "Double Fault" & "All the King's Horses" |
| 2012 | Ben and Kate | Trick-or-Treater | Episode: "Scaredy Kate" (uncredited) |
| 2013 | Hot in Cleveland | Young Melanie | Episode: "No Glove, No Love" |
| 2013 | Dear Dumb Diary | Isabella Vinchella | Television film |
| 2014 | New Girl | Wendy | Episode: "Dance" |
| 2016–18 | Kevin Can Wait | Sara Gable | Main cast; 48 episodes |
| 2022 | Naomi | Annabelle Peters | Main cast; 13 episodes |
