= 2008 in comics =

Notable events of 2008 in comics.

== Events ==
=== January ===
- January 9: Teen Titans: The Lost Annual, delayed since 2003, is published.
- January 17: Trik wins the Inktspotprijs for Best Political Cartoon.
- January 22: Webcomic Yehuda Moon and the Kickstand Cyclery by Rick Smith begins publication.
- January 23: Hellblazer #240, marking the 20th anniversary of the series, is released.

=== February ===
- February 11: Belgian comic artist Marc Sleen is declared an honorary citizen of Turnhout.
- Ji Kangmin begins the Korean webcomic Welcome to Convenience Store

=== March ===
- March 5: Fables: 1001 Nights of Snowfall by Bill Willingham softcover edition released under the Vertigo imprint.

=== April ===
- April 1: Acclaimed historian, political scientist and social critic Howard Zinn releases A People's History of American Empire. The book was co-authored by historian Paul Buhle and cartoonist Mike Konopacki.
- April 3: Graphic novel Britten and Brülightly by Hannah Berry is published by Random House under their Jonathan Cape imprint
- April 7: Jessica Hagy's webcomic Indexed is voted best blog of the year by Time.com.
- April 20: At the New York Comic Con, Marvel announces Marvel Apes, which will start in October.
- April 23: Countdown to Final Crisis concludes.
- April 28: Universal Studios announce that they have optioned Oni Press' Resurrection by Marc Guggenheim, to be produced by Scott Stuber.
- April 30: Barry Allen returns to the DC Universe proper 23 years after his death in Crisis on Infinite Earths. The return came in DC Universe #0.

=== May ===
- May 2: The Iron Man film, based on the character of the same name, is released in theaters.
- May 28: Final Crisis #1 is released.

=== June ===
- Me and My Ainia by Lai Ann wins the Outstanding Comics Award from the Institute for Compilation and Translation of Taiwan
- Tiny Titans released by DC Comics

=== July ===
- July 9: A comics mural, depicting a scene from Willem Elsschot's graphic novel adaptation of Gerard Reve's novel Cheese is inaugurated in Antwerp, as part of the city's Comic Book Route.
- The Dark Knight takes in a record $155.34 million in its opening weekend, topping the previous best of $151.1 million for Spider-Man 3 in May 2007.
- Wildstorm's World's End event begins in the aftermath of Number of the Beast.
- Comic Book Tattoo, the comic book anthology based on the lyrics of Tori Amos makes its debut at San Diego Comic-Con.

=== August ===
- August 2: To celebrate the 70th anniversary of the British comics magazine The Beano, Nick Park is guest editor.

=== September ===
- September 10: In the Netherlands René Schoenmakers and Marc Jansen, co-found Catawiki, a compendium of collector's catalogues.
- September 27: During the Stripdagen in Houten, The Netherlands, Erik Kriek receives the Stripschapprijs. Pim Oosterheert, author of various books about Marten Toonder, receives the P. Hans Frankfurtherprijs. Bob van den Born and Jaap Kramer receive the Bulletje en Boonestaak Schaal.

=== October ===
- Hellboy: In The Chapel Of Moloch, the first Hellboy series written and drawn by Mike Mignola since 2005, is scheduled to ship.
- October 8: Archaia Studios Press confirm they have been bought by Kunoichi, the company established by Joshua Blaylock, former president at Devil's Due Publishing.

=== November ===
- November 14: French cartoonist Piem is named Knight in the Ordre National du Mérite.
- November 18: Jonas Geirnaert's comic strip Kabouter Wesley makes its debut in HUMO.
- The non-fiction book Becoming Batman: The Possibility of a Superhero is published by E. Paul Zehr.

=== Specific date unknown ===
- Seung-Jin Park and Kim Jung Gi launch the webcomic series TLT - Tiger the Long Tail, which will run until 2010.
- Ryan K. Hudson launches his webcomic series Channelate.

== Deaths ==
=== January ===
- January 3: Johan van Dijk, Dutch comics artist and illustrator (Onze Rusteloze Aarde, Wonderen der Natuur), dies at age 90.
- January 6: Marty Links, American comics artist (Emmy Lou), dies at age 90.
- January 18: Joaquin Cervante Bassoco, Mexican comics artist (Pies Lanos, Tirando a Gol (El Pirata Negro), Wama), dies at age 89.
- January 19: Rik Clément, Belgian comics artist (Dees Dubbel), dies at age 87.

=== February ===
- February 2: Gus Arriola, Mexican-American comics artist (Gordo), dies at age 90.
- February 10: Steve Gerber, American comic book writer (Marvel Comics, DC Comics, creator of Howard the Duck), dies from idiopathic pulmonary fibrosis at age 60.
- February 11: Stéphane Peru, French comics artist (Shaman) and colorist (DC Comics), dies at age 26.
- February 22: Steve Whitaker, British comics colourist (V for Vendetta), dies at age 53.

=== March ===
- March 2: Francesco Pescador, Italian comics artist (Tony Boy, Il Piccolo Sceriffo, Philly il Ragazzi dagli Occhi d'Oro), dies at age 93.
- March 8: Franco Paludetti, Italian animator and comic artist (worked on Diabolik), dies at age 83.
- March 10: Dave Stevens, American comic book artist (creator of the Rocketeer), dies of hairy cell leukemia at age 52.
- March 17: Daniel Traver Griñó, Spanish comics artist (Sam Bory y el Telesforo, 1X2 el Extraterrestre, Tontáinez, El Tonto del Pueblo and Don Florencio), dies at age 76.
- March 18: Wes Alexander, American comics artist (Stormfield), dies at age 41.
- March 19: Hugo Claus, Belgian novelist, playwright, poet and film director (wrote the script for the comic strip Belgman with Hugo De Kempeneer, aka hugOKÉ), dies from euthanasia at age 78.
- March 21: Raymond Leblanc, Belgian comics publisher and animated film producer. Founder of the Belgian comics magazine Tintin, dies at age 92.
- March 21: Maurice Maréchal, Belgian comics artist (Prudence Petitpas), dies at age 85.
- March 30: Jim Mooney, American comic book artist and writer (DC Comics, Marvel Comics), dies at age 88.

=== April ===
- April 2: Roger Blachon, French teacher, journalist, book illustrator, editorial cartoonist and comic artist (Des Oiseaux Ordinaires), dies at age 66.
- April 14: Ollie Johnston, American animator (Walt Disney Company), dies at age 95.
- April 15: Robert Vandersteen, Belgian comics artist (Tony and Lily, worked on De Rode Ridder) and son of Willy Vandersteen, dies at age 68.

=== May ===
- May 3: Ted Key, American animator and comics artist (Hazel), dies at age 95.
- May 5: Edith Hegenbarth, German comics artist (Digedags), dies at age 83.
- May 12: Virgilio Martínez Gaínza, Cuban comic artist (Pucho, Supertiñosa), dies at age 77.
- May 13: Mike Western, British comics artist (Darkie's Mob, continued Billy's Boots), dies at age 83 following a heart attack and a stroke.
- May 15: Will Elder, American comics artist (EC Comics, Mad Magazine, co-creator of Little Annie Fanny), dies at age 86.
- May 19: Rory Root, American comics store owner (founder and owner of Comic Relief in Berkeley, California), dies at age 50.
- May 21: Mel Casson, American comics artist (Jeff Crockett, Sparky, Angel, co-worked on Mixed Singles (later titled Boomer), continued Redeye), dies at age 87.
- May 27: Ed Arno, American comics artist, cartoonist, caricaturist and illustrator (worked for Urzica, Krokodil and The New Yorker), dies at age 91.

=== June ===
- June 5: Pete Tumlinson, American comics artist (Kid Colt), dies at age 87.
- June 8: Vladimiro Missaglia, aka Miro, Italian comics artist and animator (I Tre Marines, Kali), dies at age 75.
- June 27: Michael Turner, American comics artist (worked for DC Comics), dies at age 37 from bone cancer.

=== July ===
- July 17: Creig Flessel, American comics artist (Sandman, Shining Knight), dies at age 96.

=== August ===
- August 2: Fujio Akatsuka, Japanese manga artist (Tensai Bakabon, Osomatsu-kun), dies at age 72.
- August 5: Jack Kamen, American comics artist (worked for EC Comics), dies at age 88.
- August 6: Arnold H. Clerkx, Dutch comics artist (Ling Khi Tong, Joessoef), dies at age 88.
- August 7:
  - Eugênio Colonnese, Italian-Brazilian comics artist (Mylar, O Homem Mistério, Superargo, Pele de Cobra, O Morto do Pântano, Mirza, a mulher vampiro), dies at age 78.
  - Stefan Nagy, Swedish comics artist (Fritz von Flaxen, Ödeshandsken, It, Dark World, Carnak & Denim), dies at age 56 or 57.
- August 13: Martin Berthommier, French comic artist (Touffu), dies at age .
- August 15: Carlos Meglia, Argentine animator and comics artist (Irish Coffee, Cybersix, Canari), dies at age 50.

=== September ===
- September 2: Bill Melendez, American animator (Walt Disney Company, Peanuts animated features), dies at age 91.
- September 15: Gedeone Malagola, Brazilian comics artist (Raio Negro, Hydroman, Homem Lua), dies at age 84.
- September 26: Raymond Macherot, Belgian comics artist (Chlorophylle, Clifton, Sibylline), dies at age 91.

=== October ===
- October 15: Guus Boissevain, aka Gub, Dutch comics artist (Piet Pelle, Snuf en de Grollenburgers, Bliep en Barthold, also worked for the Dutch edition of Mad), dies at age 79.
- October 16: Mark Buck, American comics artist, dies at age 41 in a motorcycle accident.
- October 20:
  - Les Barton, British comics artist (continued Billy Bunter), dies at age 84.
  - Ken Hunter, British comics artist (Jeff and Bill Star in the kingdom of Zero, Barney's Barmy Army, Mr. Licko and His Lollipops), dies at age 91 or 92.
- October 31: Mongo Sisé, Congolese comics artist (Mata Mata et Pili Pili, Bingo, Tchindé), dies from a stroke at age 60.

=== November ===
- November 11: Lasse Sandberg, Swedish comics artist and illustrator (Ångvälten Andersson, Vilde Viktor, Gojan Patrik, Orädda Oskar, Idrottsmannen Eskil), dies at age 84.
- November 15:
  - Janusz Christa, Polish comic artist (Kajtek i Koko, Kajko and Kokosz), dies at age 74
  - Cláudio Seto, aka Chuji Seto Takeguma, Brazilian comics artist (María Erótica, O Samurai), dies at age 64.
- November 17: Guy Peellaert, Belgian painter, album cover designer, illustrator and comics artist (Les Aventures de Jodelle, Pravada la Surviveuse, The Game, SHE and the Green Rairs), dies from cancer at age 74.
- November 25: Sergio Rosi, Italian comics artist (Simonetta, Il Principe Scimmiotto, Cochito, Volpetto, Mustafà, Ramirez & Gonzales, Bill Revolver, Jacula), dies at an unknown age.
- November 28: Enrico De Seta, Italian comics artist, cartoonist and caricaturist (Giovanni-qui-obéit, Bacù), dies at age 100.
- November 28: Leon Lazarus, American comics writer and editor (worked for Marvel Comics), dies at age 89.

=== December ===
- December 4: Fritz Behrendt, German-Dutch political cartoonist, dies at age 83.
- December 6: Gérard Lauzier, French comics artist (Tranches de Vie, Al Crane), dies at age 76.
- December 11: Maddie Blaustein, American comic writer (Milestone Media), dies at age 48.
- December 16: Vic Donahue, American comics artist (comics about scientific subjects), dies at age 90.
- December 23: Pietro Gamba, Italian comics artist (continued Kinowa, Pecos Bill), dies at age 83.

=== Specific date unknown ===
- Rik Jottier, Belgian comics artist and illustrator (Wopsie: De Avonturen van een Bewaarengeltje), dies at age 81 or 82.
- Marits Rietdijk, Dutch illustrator and comics artist (comics for motorcycle magazines), dies at age 87 or 88.
- Lui Yu-tin (also spelled as Louie Yu Tin), Chinese comics artist (Wu-lung Wong, aka King of Blunders), dies at age 80 or 81.

== Exhibitions ==
- September 9–December 5 (Museum of Comic and Cartoon Art, New York City) — Kim Deitch retrospective
- November 8, 2008 – January 10, 2009 (Brooklyn Public Library — Central Library) — "The Art of Politics" by Randy Jones (with work from The New York Times, The Wall Street Journal, and Newsday, as well as illustrations from the Inner Circle Program, a charity show presented by journalists who cover New York City Hall)
- November 8, 2008 – January 10, 2009 (Brooklyn Public Library — Central Library) — "A.D.: New Orleans After the Deluge" by Josh Neufeld, including a section detailing the process from script to final art.
- November 8, 2008 – January 10, 2009 (Brooklyn Public Library — Central Library) — "Clip-Art Comics" by David Rees
- November 17–21 (Istituto Italiano di Cultura; Cultural Services of the French Embassy; School of Visual Arts; MoCCA (Museum of Comic and Cartoon Art); La Maison Française/NYU; Prague Kolektiv, New York City) — "Graphic Novels from Europe" (exhibitions of and discussions with Igort, David Mazzucchelli, Nicolas de Crécy, David B., Isabel Kreitz, Max, Jaroslav Rudiš, and Jaromír 99)

== Conventions ==
- January 12–13: Dallas Comic Con X, Richardson Civic Center, Richardson, Texas, USA — guests include Tony DeZuniga, Harold LeDoux, Scott Kurtz, Kristian Donaldson, Nick Derington, Kristofer Straub, Cal Slayton, Brad W. Foster, James O'Barr, Bob Layton, Terry Moore, Steve Niles, Cully Hamner, Tim Bradstreet, Matt Sturges, Brian Denham, Sarah Wilkinson, David Hopkins, Jaime Mendoza, Cat Staggs, and Scott Harben
- January 24–27: Angoulême International Comics Festival, Angoulême, France
- January 26–27: Phoenix Comicon (Mesa, Arizona, USA) — 5,200 attendees; official guests: Maral Agnerian, Greg Ayres, David Beaty, Jeremy Bulloch, Svetlana Chmakova, Luci Christian, Shannon Denton, Walter Koenig, Jeph Loeb, Peter Mayhew, Ed McGuinness, Dawn "Kaijugal" McKechnie, Angel Medina, Michelle Ruff, Armand Villavert Jr., Mark Waid, Wil Wheaton, and Andrew Wheelan
- February 2–3: Hi-Ex, website, Inverness, Scotland
- February 22–24: WonderCon, San Francisco, USA
- March 1–2: Small Press and Alternative Comics Expo (S.P.A.C.E.) (Aladdin Shrine Center, Columbus, Ohio) — special guest: Dave Sim
- March 1: STAPLE!, Austin, USA
- March 7–9: MegaCon (Orlando Convention Center, Orlando, Florida, USA) — guests include Jennie Breeden, Brian Clevinger, Amanda Conner, Caitlin Glass, Mark Goddard, Erin Gray, Neil Kaplan, June Lockhart, George Lowe, Cynthia Martinez, Peter Mayhew, Vic Mignogna, Paul Pelletier, Joe Quesada, Stan Sakai, William Tucci, and Mark Waid
- March 16: New York City Comic Book Spectacular (Holiday Inn Midtown, New York City) — guest of honor Michael Avon Oeming
- March 16–18: Wizard World Los Angeles (Los Angeles Convention Center, Los Angeles, California, USA)
- March 22: UK Web & Mini Comix Thing, website, London, UK
- April 5–6: Dallas Comic Con & Sci-Fi Expo, Richardson Civic Center, Richardson, Texas, USA
- April 12: FLUKE Mini-Comics & Zine Festival (Tasty World, Athens, Georgia)
- April 12–13: Toronto ComiCON Fan Appreciation Event (Metro Toronto Convention Centre, Toronto, Ontario, Canada)
- April 18–20: New York Comic Con, New York, USA
- April 25–27: Pittsburgh Comicon (Monroeville Expomart, Monroeville, Pennsylvania, USA) — guests include Timothy Truman, Mike Grell, Robert Tinnell, Tom DeFalco, Ron Frenz, Billy Tucci, David W. Mack, Tommy Castillo, David Prowse, Aaron Douglas, Brian Harnois, and Kane Hodder
- April 26–27: Stumptown Comics Fest (Lloyd Center Doubletree Hotel, Portland, Oregon)
- May 9–11: Bristol Comic Expo (Commonwealth Hall and the Ramada Plaza, Bristol, UK) — guests include Jim Shooter, Walt Simonson, Jim Starlin, and Dave Gibbons. Presentation of the Eagle Awards, hosted by comedian Fraser Ayres.
- May 10–11: Emerald City ComiCon (Washington State Convention & Trade Center, Seattle, Washington, USA) — 10,000 attendees; guests: Ethan Van Sciver, Arthur Suydam, Jeffrey Brown, Whilce Portacio, Mike Choi, J. Michael Straczynski, Phil Jimenez, Derek Kirk Kim, Bryan Lee O'Malley, Andy Runton, Tim Sale, Tony Bedard, Jim Cheung, Bill Willingham, Gail Simone, Kaare Andrews, Skottie Young, Dan DiDio, David Finch, Aaron Williams, Phil Noto, Michael Avon Oeming, Eric Powell, Richard Starkings, Darick Robertson, Nat Jones, Stephane Roux, Alfonso Azpiri, Sanjulián, Esteban Maroto, Juan Gimenez, Steve Sadowski, Moose Baumann, Philip Tan, Dustin Weaver, Eric Basaldua, Jeph Jacques, Jason Howard, Craig Rousseau, Chris Moreno, Todd Dezago, Tone Rodriguez, Stephen "JB" Jones, Matt Kindt, Robert Kirkman, Ryan Ottley, Clayburn Moore, Tom Raney, Eric Canete, Greg Rucka, Ed Brubaker, Aaron Lopresti, Dustin Nguyen, Dan Wickline, Clayton Crain, Scott Kurtz, Brad Guigar, Dave Kellett, Rick Remender, Karl Kesel, and Brian Haberlin
- May 16–18: Motor City Comic Con (Rock Financial Showplace, Novi, Michigan, USA)
- May 16–17: East Coast Black Age of Comics Convention (African American Museum in Philadelphia and Temple University's Anderson Hall, Philadelphia, Pennsylvania) — celebrating black women in comics; guests include Jerry Craft
- May 17–18: Montevideo Comics, Montevideo, Uruguay
- May 30 – June 1: Wizard World Philadelphia (Philadelphia Convention Center, Philadelphia, Pennsylvania)
- June 7–8: Big Apple Comic Book, Art, Toy & Sci-Fi Expo I (Penn Plaza Pavilion, New York City, USA) — guests include Bernie Wrightson, Gene Ha, Rich Buckler, Irwin Hasen, Joe Giella, Ivan Brandon, Alex Maleev, Billy Tucci, Tommy Castillo, Mark Texeira, Danny Fingeroth, and Michael Avon Oeming
- June 7–8: MoCCA Festival (Puck Building, New York City, USA)
- June 13–15: Adventure Con (Knoxville Convention Center, Knoxville, Tennessee, USA) — guest of honor: Michael Golden; other guests include Arthur Suydam
- June 20–22: Heroes Convention, Charlotte, USA — guests include Jason Aaron, Jim Amash, Marc Arsenault, Liz Baillie, Michael Bair, Christian Beranek, Dan Berger, Ivan Brandon, June Brigman, Mark Brooks, Jeffrey Brown, J. Scott Campbell, Nick Cardy, Johanna Draper Carlson, KC Carlson, Richard Case, Tommy Castillo, Kody Chamberlain, Bernard Chang, Matt Chapman, Mike Chapman, Sean Chen, Cliff Chiang, Frank Cho, Darwyn Cooke, Amanda Conner, Jeremy Dale, Guy Davis, Mike Dawson, Kelly Sue DeConnick, Vito Delsante, Todd Dezago, Dan Didio, Michael Dooney, Colleen Doran, Evan Dorkin, Dave Dorman, Chris Duffy, Sarah Dyer, Nathan Edmondson, Tommy Lee Edwards, Josh Elder, Steve Epting, Michael Eury, Tom Feister, Al Feldstein, David Finch, Ian Flynn, Matt Fraction, Francesco Francavilla, Gary Friedrich, Rob G., John Gallagher, Chris Giarrusso, Dick Giordano, Bryan J. L. Glass, Michael Golden, Jimmy Gownley, Keron Grant, Nicholas Gurewitch, Cully Hamner, Scott Hampton, Sammy Harkham, Tony Harris, Irwin Hasen, Jeremy Haun, Jaime Hernandez, Jonathan Hickman, Greg Horn, Adam Hughes, Kevin Huizenga, Kathryn Immonen, Stuart Immonen, Georges Jeanty, Nat Jones, Rafael Kayanan, Karl Kesel, Matt Kindt, Robert Kirkman, Barry Kitson, Peter Laird, Roger Langridge, Erik Larsen, Hope Larson, Jason Latour, Steve Lavigne, Jim Lawson, John Paul Leon, Alec Longstreth, Heidi MacDonald, David W. Mack, Jim Mahfood, David Malki, Laura Martin, Nathan Massengill, Paul Maybury, Bob McLeod, Chris Moreno, Dan Nadel, Steve Niles, Phil Noto, Bryan Lee O'Malley, Michael Avon Oeming, Jim Ottaviani, Ryan Ottley, Jimmy Palmiotti, Jeff Parker, Brandon Peterson, Ed Piskor, Chris Pitzer, Liz Prince, Brian Pulido, Brian Ralph, Rick Remender, Ross Richie, Paolo Rivera, Alex Robinson, Andrew Robinson, Budd Root, Craig Rousseau, Stéphane Roux, Jim Rugg, Andy Runton, Chris Samnee, Jim Scancarelli, Tom Scioli, Rick Spears, Tom Spurgeon, Chris Staros, Joe Staton, Brian Stelfreeze, Karl Story, Kazimir Strzepek, Matthew Sturges, Eric Talbot, Mark Texeira, Roy Thomas, Andie Tong, Tim Townsend, Herb Trimpe, Dean Trippe, Rob Ullman, Ethan Van Sciver, Dexter Vines, Neil Vokes, Matt Wagner, Mark Waid, Loston Wallace, Daniel Way, Julia Wertz, Ron Wilson, Renée Witterstaetter, and John Workman
- June 26–29: Wizard World Chicago (Donald E. Stephens Convention Center, Rosemont, Illinois, USA) — c. 68,000 attendees; guest of honor: Warren Ellis; special guests: Todd McFarlane, Brian Michael Bendis, Alex Ross, Steve Sansweet
- July 12–13: Paradise Comicon Toronto, Holiday Inn on King, Toronto, Ontario, Canada — guests of honor: Herb Trimpe, Joseph Michael Linsner, and Greg Land
- July 13: X-Trava-Con Comic Book, Toy and Non-Sports Card Show (Knights of Columbus Hall, Livonia, Michigan, USA)
- July 19–20: London Film & Comic Con, website, London, UK
- July 24–27: San Diego Comic-Con, San Diego, USA — 125,000 attendees; guests include Sergio Aragonés, Alison Bechdel, Allen Bellman, Ray Bradbury, Dan Brereton, Daryl Cagle, Cecil Castellucci, Darwyn Cooke, Guy Delisle, Paul Dini, Roman Dirge, Cory Doctorow, Ann Eisner, Warren Ellis, Mark Evanier, Renee French, Gary Friedrich, Christos N. Gage, Neil Gaiman, Rick Geary, George Gladir, Laurell K. Hamilton, Gilbert Hernandez, Jaime Hernandez, Adam Hughes, Joe Jusko, Miriam Katin, Mel Keefer, Scott Kurtz, Joseph Michael Linsner, Joe Matt, David Morrell, Karen Palinko, Lily Renee Phillips, Mike Ploog, Paul Pope, George A. Romero, Rowena, Dave Stevens, J. Michael Straczynski, Ben Templesmith, Roy Thomas, Morrie Turner, Mark Verheiden, Matt Wagner, J. H. Williams III, Kent Williams, F. Paul Wilson, Brian Wood, and more
- August 9–10: "Timewarp CAPTION" (East Oxford Community Centre, Oxford, England, UK)
- August 22–24: Fan Expo Canada (Metro Toronto Convention Centre, Toronto, Ontario, Canada) — 44,500 attendees; guests include Buzz Aldrin, Kate Mulgrew, Edward James Olmos, Brent Spiner, Michael Rosenbaum, Sean Astin, Laura Vandervoort, Renee O'Connor, Kristy Swanson, Jeremy Bulloch, Henry Winkler, Michael Easton, Aaron Douglas, Tobe Hooper, John Saxon, Wes Craven, Sid Haig, Brad Dourif, Ruggero Deodato, Tura Satana, Shawnee Smith, Bruce McDonald, Hugh Dillon, Alex Ross. Brian Bolland. Tim Sale, Mark Bagley, Peter David, Matt Fraction, Gabriele Dell'Otto, Marko Djurdjevic, Cliff Chiang, Georges Jeanty, Alex Maleev, Keith Giffen, J. Scott Campbell, Adam Hughes, Steve McNiven, Ethan Van Sciver, Kevin Eastman, Bob Layton, Angel Medina (artist), Dexter Vines, Vic Mignogna, Derek Stephen Prince, Johnny Yong Bosch, Michelle Ruff, Richard Ian Cox, Victor Lucas, Jon Jacobs, and Donna Mei-Ling Park
- August 29 – September 1: Dragon Con (Hyatt Regency Atlanta/Marriott Marquis/Atlanta Hilton/Sheraton, Atlanta, Georgia, USA) — 30,000 attendees; guests include Laurell K. Hamilton, Sean Astin, Micky Dolenz, Robert Llewellyn, James Randi, and Hayden Panettiere
- September 13–14: Montreal Comiccon (Place Bonaventure, Montreal, Quebec) — 1,100 attendees
- September 27–28: Baltimore Comic-Con, Baltimore, USA
- October–November: FIBDA (Amadora, Portugal) — dedicated to fantasy and science fiction
- October 4–5: Mid-Ohio Con (Columbus Convention Center, Columbus, OH, USA) — show acquired by GCX Holdings, merges with Ohio Comic Con
- October 4–5: Small Press Expo (Bethesda North Marriott Hotel & Conference Center, North Bethesda, Maryland)
- October 9–10: International Comic Arts Forum (School of the Art Institute of Chicago, Chicago, Illinois) — guests include Jorge Opazo Ellicker AKA Jorge Quien, Nicolas Mahler, and Damian Duffy
- October 11–12: Manitoba Comic Con (Winnipeg Convention Centre, Winnipeg, Manitoba, Canada) — 16,000+ attendees; guests include Lou Ferrigno, Jeremy Bulloch, LeVar Burton, Erica Durance, Justin Hartley, Charlie Adler, Gerrit Graham, and John de Lancie
- October 11–12: Komikazen (Ravenna, Italy) — guests include Zeina Abirached
- November 1–2: Alternative Press Expo, San Francisco, USA
- November 1–2: Lille Comics Festival, Lille, France
- November 7–9: Wizard World Texas (Arlington Convention Center, Dallas, Texas, USA)
- November 14–30: Comica — London International Comics Festival (Institute of Contemporary Arts, London, UK) — organized by Paul Gravett; guests include Art Spiegelman, Spain Rodriguez, Gilbert Shelton, Steve Holland, Alan Moore, Melinda Gebbie, Pat Mills, Posy Simmonds, Daniel Merlin Goodbrey, Lise Myhre, Asia Alfasi, Emma Rendel, Dave McKean, Ian Rankin, Alex Maleev, Paul Gambaccini, Ian Rakoff, Ted Benoit, Jean Van Hamme, Emmanuel Guibert, Joann Sfar, Kevin Jackson, Doug Braithwaite, Richard Reynolds, Eric Fernie, Hannah Berry, Paul Duffield, Oliver East, Marcia Williams, Richard Appignanesi, Ian Edginton, Ian Culbard, John M. Burns, Mike Collins, David Leach, David Roach, Gary Northfield, Sarah McIntyre, Erich von Götha, Garry Leach, Frederic Mullally, Mike Lake, Greg Theakston, James Romberger.
- November 14–16: National Comic Book, Art, Toy & Sci-Fi Expo (Penn Plaza Pavilion, New York City, USA) — guests include Jim Steranko, John Romita, Jr., Michael Golden, Neal Adams, Bernie Wrightson, Gene Ha, Rich Buckler, Irwin Hasen, Joe Giella, Ivan Brandon, Alex Maleev, William Tucci, Tommy Castillo, Mark Texeira, Danny Fingeroth, Carmine Infantino, Mark Evanier, Bryan Talbot, Brian Michael Bendis, Evan Dorkin, Walt Simonson, Michael Avon Oeming, Peter Mayhew, Robin Riggs, Basil Gogos, Kate Mulgrew, and George Lazenby
- November 22–23: Dublin City Comic Con (Park Inn, Smithfield Square, Dublin, Ireland) — guests include: Dan Slott, Adi Granov, Olivier Copiel, Jonathan Hickman, Tommy Lee Edwards, Michael Lark, Paul Cornell, C. B. Cebulski, Liam Sharp, Esad Ribić, Matt Hollingsworth, Nick Roche, Stephen Mooney, Steve Thompson
- November 22: Comica Comiket (Institute of Contemporary Arts, London, England) — co-sponsored by London Underground Comics

== First issues by title ==
Aetheric Mechanics
Release: December 5 by Avatar Press. Writer: Warren Ellis. Artist: Gianluca Pagliarani
Anna Mercury
Release: April 2 by Avatar Press. Writer: Warren Ellis. Artist: Facundo Percio
American Dream
Release: May by Marvel Comics. Writer: Tom DeFalco Artists: Todd Nauck and Scott Koblish
The Evil Dead
Release: January by Dark Horse Comics. Writer: Mark Verheiden. Artist: John Bolton
Bayan Knights
Release: September by Sacred Mountain Publications. Writers: Various
Blade of the Warrior: Kshatriya
Release: by Virgin Comics. Writer: Arjun Gaind Artist: R.Manikandan
Blood Bowl: Killer Contract
Release: June 25 by Boom! Studios. Writer: Matt Forbeck Artist: Lads Helloven.
The Bond of Saint Marcel
Release: July 30 by Archaia Studios Press. Writer: Jennifer Quintenz. Artists: Christian Gossett & Marshall Dillion
Cable
Release: March by Marvel Comics. Writer: Duane Swierczynski. Artist: Ariel Olivetti
Captain Britain and MI: 13
Release: May 14 by Marvel Comics. Writer: Paul Cornell Artists: Leonard Kirk and Jesse Delperdang
Countdown Special: The New Gods
Release: March by DC Comics. Reprints: Forever People #1 (1971), Mister Miracle #1 (1971) and The New Gods #7 (1971)
Countdown Special: OMAC
Release: April by DC Comics. Reprints: OMAC #1 (1974), The Warlord #37–39 (1976) and DC Comics Presents #61 (1978)
Deepak Chopra's Buddha
Release: March by Liquid Comics. Writer: Deepak Chopra
Exiles
Release: March by Marvel Comics. Writer: Mike Raicht. Summary: A recap of the adventures in the first 100 issues of Exiles
Final Crisis
Release: May by DC Comics. Writer: Grant Morrison Artist: J. G. Jones, Cover by: Art Baltazar
Final Crisis: Legion of Three Worlds
Release: August by DC Comics. Writer: Geoff Johns. Artist: George Pérez
Final Crisis: Revelations
Release: August by DC Comics. Writer: Greg Rucka. Artist:s Phillip Tan, Jeff De Los Santos and Jonathan Glapion;
GeNext
Release: May 14 by Marvel Comics. Writer: Chris Claremont Artist: Patrick Scherberger, Cover by: Doug Gregory Alexander
Gigantic
Release: October by Dark Horse Comics. Writer: Rick Remender Artist: Eric Nguyen
Goblin Chronicles
Release: March by Ape Entertainment. Writers: Troy Dye, Tom Kelesides Artist: Collin Fogel
Guardians of the Galaxy
Release: May 14 by Marvel Comics. Writers: Dan Abnett and Andy Lanning Artist: Paul Pelletier
Haunt of Horror: Lovecraft
Release: June 4 by Marvel Max. Writer: Richard Corben. Artist: Richard Corben
High Rollers
Release: July by Boom! Studios. Writer: Gary Phillips. Artist: Manuel Magalhaes
House of Mystery
Release: May by Vertigo. Writer: Matthew Sturges and Bill Willingham Artists: Luca Rossi and Ross Campbell
Indiana Jones and the Tomb of the Gods
Release: June by Dark Horse Comics. Writer: Rob Williams Artist: Steve Scott. Cover by: Art Baltazar
Avengers/Invaders
Release: May by Marvel Comics/Dynamite Entertainment. Writers: Alex Ross and Jim Krueger Artist: Steve Sadowski
Kick-Ass
Release: April by Icon. Writer: Mark Millar. Artist: John Romita, Jr.
King Golf
Release: August by Shogakukan (Weekly Shōnen Sunday). Author: Ken Sasaki.
Locke & Key
Release: February 20 by IDW Publishing. Writer: Joe Hill. Artist:s Gabriel Rodriguez & Jay Fotos
The Man with No Name
Release: May by Dynamite Entertainment. Writer: Christos Gage Artist: Wellington Dias
Marvel 1985
Release: May 29 by Marvel Comics. Writer: Mark Millar Artist: Tommy Lee Edwards
Marvel Zombies 3
Release: October 1 by Marvel Comics. Writer: Fred Van Lente. Artist: Kev Walker
Minister Jade
Release: June by Cellar Door Publishing. Writer and Artist: Steve Bialik
New Exiles
Release: April by Marvel Comics. Writer: Chris Claremont. Artist: Tom Grummett. Summary: Relaunch of Exiles with this following on directly from Exiles #100
Number of the Beast
Release: April 9 by Wildstorm. Writer: Scott Beatty. Artist: Chris Sprouse
Project Superpowers
Release: January by Dynamite Entertainment. Writer: Jim Krueger. Artista: Doug Klauba & Stephen Sadowski
Hulk
Release: January by Marvel Comics. Writer: Jeph Loeb III. Artist: Ed McGuinness

Reign in Hell

Release: July by DC Comics. Writer: Keith Giffen. Artist: Tom Derenick
Runaways
Release: August by Marvel Comics. The third volume of the series marks the third creative team of Terry Moore and Humberto Ramos.
Secret Invasion
Release: April 2 by Marvel Comics. Writer: Brian Michael Bendis. Artists: Leinil Yu & Mark Morales
Skaar: Son of Hulk
Release: June by Marvel Comics. Writer: Greg Pak. Artist: Ron Garney
Sky Doll
Release: May 14 by Marvel Comics/Soleil. Writers: Barbara Canepa and Alessandro Barbucci Artist: Alessandro Barbucci
Station
Release: June 25 by Boom! Studios. Writer: Johanna Stokes Artists: Leno Carvalho and Ed Dukeshire.
Teen Titans: The Lost Annual
Release: January 9 by DC Comics. Writer: Bob Haney; Artists Jay Stephens & Mike Allred; Cover by Nick Cardy Summary: The Teen Titans go into space to rescue President John F. Kennedy
Teen Titans: Year One
Release: January 2 by DC Comics. Writer: Amy Wolfman Artists: Karl Kerschl & Serge Lapointe. Cover by: Karl Kerschl Summary: A reimagining of how the Teen Titans came together
Tiny Titans
Release: April by DC Comics. Writer: Art Baltazar Artist: Art Baltazar, Cover by: Art Baltazar
Titanium Rain
Release: July by Archaia Studios Press. Writer: Josh Finney. Artists: Josh Finney & Kat Rocha
Trinity
Release: June by DC Comics. Writers: Kurt Busiek & Fabian Nicieza Artists: Mark Bagley, Scott McDaniel, Tom Derenick, Mike Norton and others. Cover by: Art Baltazar
True Believers
Release: July 30 by Marvel Comics. Writer: Cary Bates. Artist: Paul Gulacy
The Twelve
Release: January by Marvel Comics. Writer: J. Michael Straczynski. Artist: Chris Weston
Ultimate Human
Release: January by Marvel Comics. Writer: Warren Ellis. Artist: Cary Nord
Ultimate Origins
Release: June 4 by Marvel Comics. Writer: Brian Michael Bendis. Artist: Butch Guice
The War that Time Forgot
Release: May 7 by DC Comics. Writer: Bruce Jones Artists: Al Barrionuevo and Jimmy Palmiotti, Cover by: Neal Adams
Wildcats: Worlds End
Release: July 30 by Wildstorm. Writer: Christos Gage. Artist: Neil Googe & Trevor Hairsine
Wildstorm: Revelations
Release: January 2 by Wildstorm. Writers: Christos Gage & Scott Beatty. Artist: Wes Craig
X-Men: Manifest Destiny
Release: September 4 by Marvel Comics. Writers:Mike Carey, C. B. Cebulski, James Asmus. Artists: Michael Ryan, Victor Olazaba, Chris Burnham, David Yardin
