= Yehuda Moon and the Kickstand Cyclery =

- Cover of the first print collection
- Author(s): Rick Smith and Brian Griggs
- Website: yehudamoon.com
- Current status/schedule: On hiatus as of March 2017
- Launch date: January 22, 2008

Yehuda Moon and the Kickstand Cyclery, or Kickstand Comics, is a cycling-focused webcomic created by Web developer Rick Smith from 2008 to 2017. The titular Yehuda Moon runs a bike shop with his friend Joe and is confronted by various challenges at work and during his commute. Smith collaborated with former bike shop worker Brian Griggs to write the webcomic starting in 2010. Kickstand Comics went on indefinite hiatus in October 2011, and ran irregularly from 2015 to 2017. Six volumes of Kickstand Comics were released, many supported by Kickstarter.

== Synopsis ==
The webcomic chronicles the adventures and challenges of Yehuda Moon. The titular character runs a bike shop, the Kickstand Cyclery, with his friend Joe, and is frequently confronted with the challenges presented by his daily bicycle commute and the customers (or lack thereof) at his bike shop. Kickstand Comics features characters such as a bike ninja, a bike hypochondriac, the ghost of the previous owner of the Kickstand Cyclery, neighborhood kids, roadies, and commuters. Yehuda advocates simple, traditional, functional biking as espoused by the philosophy of Grant Petersen of Rivendell Bicycle Works. His shop partner Joe acts as a foil to Yehuda and prefers a more performance- or racing-oriented style.

== Development ==
Shaker Heights, Ohio resident Rick Smith invented the name "Yehuda Moon" in high school. When Smith moved back to Cleveland and lived 12 miles away from his Web development office, he decided to bike to and from his work every day. After a year, he decided to create a comic strip based on his commute experiences. Smith stopped multiple times on each commute to jot down strip ideas, filling up four notebooks. Smith posted his first strips on a cycling-focused Web forum, and it immediately proved highly popular within the community.

Releasing a strip every day, Smith spent just over two hours on any given page. Smith did most of his writing in the evenings during the week, and penciled a week worth of comics each weekend, using a Dixon Ticonderoga pencil on bristol board. He inked each strip with a Pentel brush pen, before erasing the pencil lines and scanning the strips into Adobe Photoshop. Smith admires the work of Harold Gray, Chester Gould, and Frank King.

Former bike shop worker Brian Griggs joined as a co-writer in late Spring 2010. The two collaborated through Google Docs; very rarely did they meet in person or talk on the phone. In October 2011, Kickstand Comics went on indefinite hiatus. After over 1,200 pages, Smith found it too difficult to make the webcomic financially sustainable, and creating it in addition to holding down other jobs proved too much. The webcomic continued to circulate on social media, and Smith and Griggs released a limited run of new strips at the start of 2015.

Because of a successful fundraising through Kickstarter.com in 2012, the second, third, and fourth volume of Kickstand Comics were released. These compiled the webstrips up to October 2011, along with unpublished material and reprints of interviews with the cartoonist, were also created and are available. A successful Kickstarter campaign in November 2015 resulted in a fifth and sixth volume to be published. The webcomic ran regularly throughout 2016 and early 2017, publishing strips that appear in the printed Volume 6.

== Impact ==
Kickstand Comics saw over 10,000 unique visitors per week in 2009. Caitlin Giddings of Bicycling Magazine described Kickstand Comics as "bike culture's best-known webcomic."
