= Minister Jade =

- Author: Steve Bialik
- Illustrator: Steve Bialik
- Language: English
- Genre: Graphic novels
- Published: 2008
- Publisher: Cellar Door Publishing
- Publication place: United States
- Media type: Print
- Pages: 188 pages
- ISBN: 097668313X

Minister Jade is a 2008 graphic novel written and illustrated by Steve Bialik. It was first released in the United States on June 25, 2008, through Cellar Door Publishing. In 2009 Minister Jade was selected as one of YALSA's "Great Graphic Novels for Teens" for that year.

== Synopsis ==
In Yuan dynasty China a down-on-his-luck former government official named Zhen Wenxiu tries to commit suicide by jumping into the stormy sea, but is instead carried off to the mysterious Island of Living Jade. There he is met by two green-skinned dwarves who question him as to the state of their former home, China. When Wenxiu informs them that it has been conquered by the Mongols and transformed into a land of oppression and injustice, the dwarves give him a magical belt of Living Jade and encourage him to use its power to free China from the Mongol yoke. But the prestige-hungry Wenxiu chooses to serve rather than destroy the occupying regime.

He insinuates himself into the retinue of Mongol emperor Kublai Khan and basks in the wealth and status of his new position. Meanwhile, a mad cult leader named Wanyao Wang is on a mission to destroy all of China with a dread mist that turns people into solid gold. Wenxiu eventually uncovers this plot and wants to act, but Khubilai Khan urges him to focus his attention instead on the impending invasion of Japan. Realizing that Khubilai cares more about his imperial ambitions than the people of China, Wenxiu finally breaks away from him and sets out to stop Wanyayo Wang. In the end he gives up the life of a high-ranking minister for that of a poor but honorable hero.

== Reception ==
Comics Bulletin gave a mixed review for Minister Jade, writing that it was "a far-from-perfect book, but it is an interesting study of a hero's journey set against a different set of cultural values." The School Library Journal was more positive, stating "Full of humor, action, and art strongly influenced by traditional Chinese design, it's a vivid origin story."
