= Bridgestone =

Japanese multinational manufacturing corporation

Bridgestone Corporation

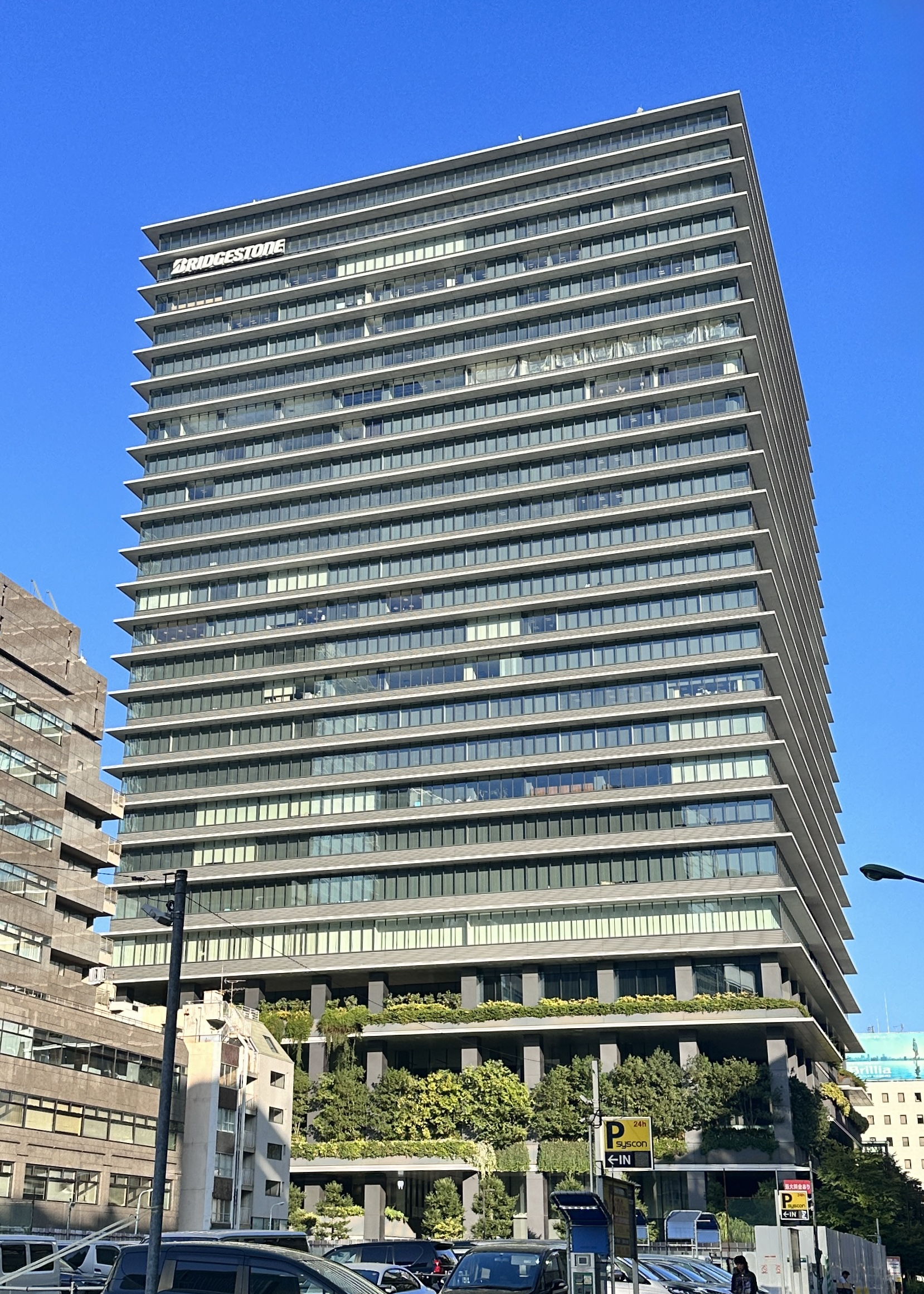
- Bridgestone's headquarters in Kyōbashi, Tokyo
- Native name: 株式会社ブリヂストン
- Romanized name: Kabushiki gaisha Burijisuton
- Formerly: Bridgestone Tire Co., Ltd. (1931–1942, 1951–1984); Nippon Tire Company (1942–1951)
- Type: Public
- Traded as: TYO: 5108; Nikkei 225 component; TOPIX Large70 component
- Industry: Manufacturing
- Founded: 1 March 1931; 95 years ago Kurume, Fukuoka, Japan
- Founder: Shojiro Ishibashi
- Headquarters: Kyōbashi, Tokyo, Japan
- Area served: Worldwide
- Key people: Yasuhiro Morita (Global CEO)
- Products: Tires, golf equipment
- Revenue: ▲¥4.11 trillion (US$25.96 billion) (Fiscal Year Ended 31 December 2023)
- Operating income: ▲¥482 billion (US$3.04 billion) (Fiscal Year Ended 31 December 2023)
- Net income: ▼¥300 billion (US$1.89 billion) (Fiscal Year Ended 31 December 2023)
- Total assets: ▲¥4.96 trillion (US$31.33 billion) (Fiscal Year Ended 31 December 2023)
- Total equity: ▲¥3.01 trillion (US$19.01 billion) (Fiscal Year Ended 31 December 2023)
- Owner: Ishibashi Foundation (11.2%); Hiroshi Ishibashi (3.07%)
- Number of employees: ▼129,262 (2023)
- Subsidiaries: Bridgestone Golf; Firestone Tire and Rubber Company
- Website: bridgestone.com

Bridgestone Corporation (株式会社ブリヂストン, Kabushiki gaisha Burijisuton) is a Japanese multinational tire and rubber manufacturing company based in Kyōbashi, Tokyo. Founded in 1931 by Shōjirō Ishibashi in Kurume, it primarily manufactures tires, as well as golf equipment. In addition to automotive tires, the company produces tires for bicycles, motorcycles, and airplanes. The name Bridgestone comes from a calque translation and transposition of the founder's surname, meaning 'stone bridge' in Japanese.

Bridgestone purchased the Firestone Tire and Rubber Company in 1988 and has supplied tires for motorsport events including Formula One, Le Mans, and Grand Prix motorcycle racing, among others. Bridgestone was also the official tire of the Olympic games until 2024.

In 2011, the company was charged with bribery and bid rigging in Latin America, and in 2014, was fined $425 million for price fixing and bid rigging by the United States Department of Justice.

The company has been the world's second-largest tire manufacturer by annual revenue since 2021. As of July 2018, Bridgestone Group has 181 production facilities in 24 countries.

== History ==
=== Origins ===
The Bridgestone Tire Company, Ltd. was founded on 1 March 1931 by Shojiro Ishibashi in Japan. The first Bridgestone tire was produced on 9 April 1930, by the Japanese "Tabi" Socks Tire Division (which actually made jika-tabi). One year later, the Bridgestone Tire Co., Ltd was established in the city of Kurume, Fukuoka Prefecture. The name Bridgestone comes from the name of the founder, Shojiro Ishibashi (石橋; lit. 'stone bridge').

Foregoing dependence on European and North American technology, the company set its sights on manufacturing tires based largely on Japanese technology. The fledgling company experienced many difficulties in technology, production, and sales in its early days. Eventually, improvements in quality and manufacturing processes led to the business rapidly expanding in domestic and overseas markets.

=== Challenges during and after World War II ===
Wartime regulations were in effect throughout Japan during World War II, and tires came under the jurisdiction of these regulations. This resulted in nearly all of the company's output being used to satisfy military demand. Although 1945 saw the end of armed conflict, the company was devastated by the war. The Tokyo headquarters was destroyed during an aerial bombing raid, and all overseas assets were lost. The plants in Kurume and Yokohama escaped unscathed, and production was able to resume immediately after the war ended. Brushing aside the problems caused by a labour union strike that lasted for 46 days, the foundations of the company were further reinforced after this.

After the war, the company started making bicycles, leading to the formation of the Bridgestone Cycle Company in 1949. In 1952, the first complete powered bicycles were produced with a 26cc engine. The first 50cc Bridgestone motorcycles were manufactured in 1958. However, the company's main income came from supplying tires to its rival motorcycle makers, such as Honda, Suzuki, and Yamaha. Bridgestone later decided to cease motorcycle manufacturing.

In 1952, Ishibashi founded the Bridgestone Museum of Art, locating it at 10 Kyobashi 1–chome, Chuo–ku, Tokyo 104, which also served as the Bridgestone Corporation's company headquarters.

=== Technological innovation ===
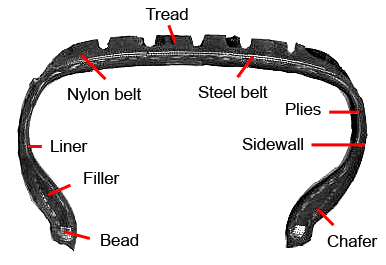
Cross section of a tire

In 1951, Bridgestone was the first company in Japan to begin selling rayon cord tires, and a five-year project to modernize production facilities was started. This year also saw another Bridgestone building opened in Kyōbashi, Tokyo, which contained the Bridgestone Museum. Sales surpassed ten billion yen in 1953, placing Bridgestone at the top of the tire industry in Japan, and celebrations were held to commemorate the 25th anniversary of the company's foundation in Kurume.

The sale of nylon tires began in 1959 and a new Tokyo plant opened in 1960 to cope with the rapidly expanding market for motorization.

=== Radial tires and overseas expansion ===
The company went public and was listed on the stock exchange in 1961. A new administration system was introduced, with Shojiro Ishibashi serving as chairman and Kanichiro Ishibashi as president. As part of this administrative reform, the company adopted total quality control activities under the Deming Plan, named in honor of W. Edwards Deming. This led to Bridgestone winning the Deming Prize in 1968. The Tokyo plant was expanded in 1962 to house a new Technical Centre and establish a progressive research and development system. On the product front, the company sold its first-ever radial tire, the RD10, in 1967.

Bridgestone opened its first postwar overseas plant in Singapore in 1965 and commenced production in Thailand in 1969. The 1960s marked an era of global expansion for Bridgestone, which included establishing Bridgestone Americas in 1967 to serve as its U.S. sales representative branch.

At the start of Japan's economic stagnation, brought about by the first oil shock, the company focused on developing its own technology for manufacturing radial tires while also constructing and equipping further domestic plants. It launched the Super Filler Radial in 1978, followed by the high-performance Potenza radial tire in 1979, named after the Italian word for power.

The company was actively engaged in overseas expansion activities at this time. In addition to starting production in Indonesia and Iran in 1976, it invested in a Taiwanese tire manufacturer and purchased both a tire plant and a diversified products plant in Australia in 1980. The founder, Shojiro Ishibashi, died on 11 September 1976.

On 1 March 1981, the company celebrated its 50th anniversary. Simultaneously, it initiated efforts to strengthen the home base supporting its global expansion strategy, aiming to rank among the world's top three rubber manufacturers. New production facilities were also established in countries including Thailand, India, Poland, China, and the United States. The company changed its name from Bridgestone Tire Co., Ltd. to Bridgestone Corporation in 1984.

=== Firestone Tire and Rubber Company purchase ===
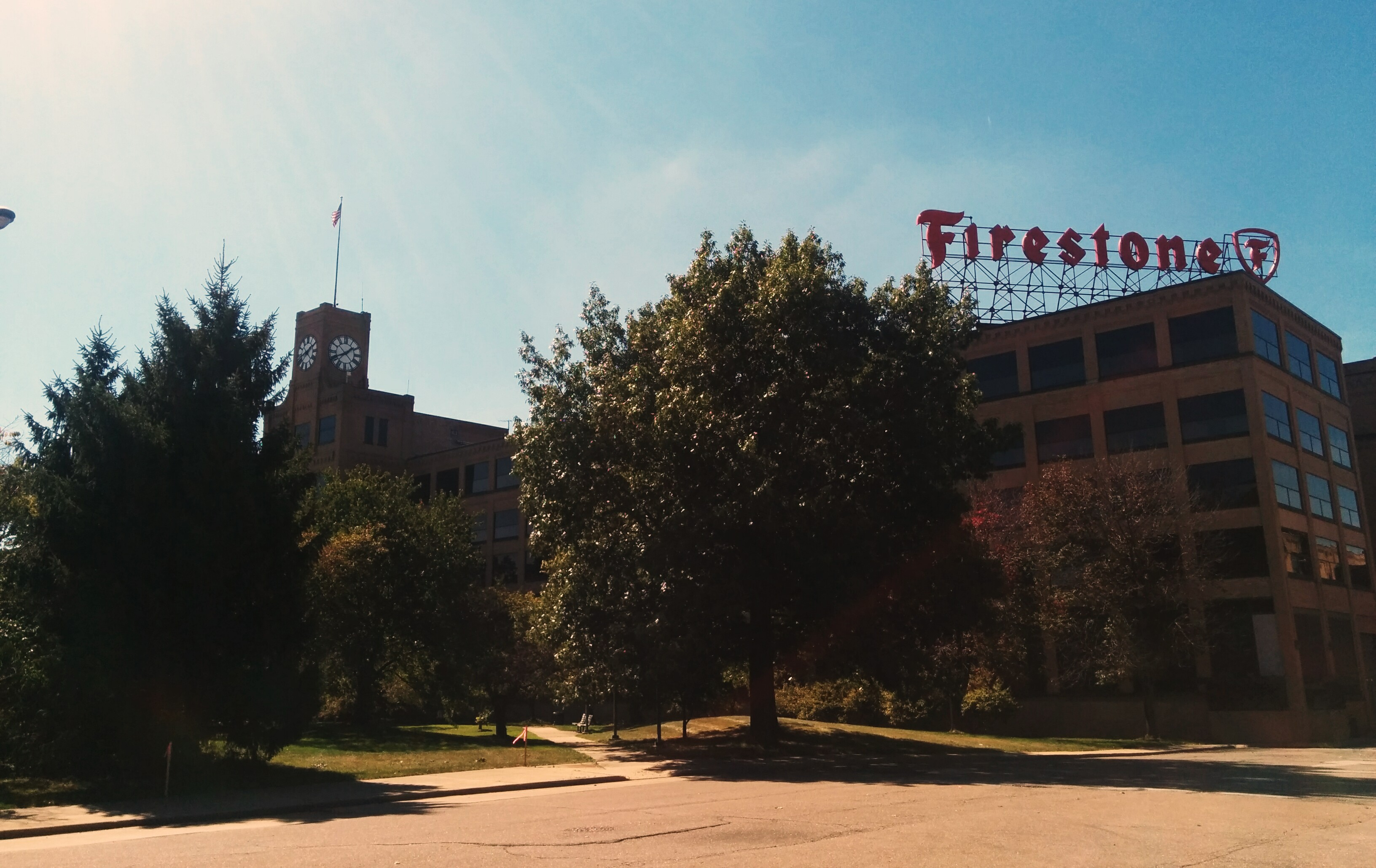
Former Firestone Tire and Rubber Company headquarters in Akron, Ohio

In 1988, Bridgestone purchased the Firestone Tire and Rubber Company of Akron, Ohio. By placing considerable financial and personnel resources into rebuilding the company, Bridgestone achieved surplus annual profits in 1992 with Bridgestone Firestone Europe and again in 1993 with Bridgestone Firestone USA. The Firestone Tire and Rubber Company and Bridgestone Tire Company Ltd. USA were amalgamated in 1990 to become Bridgestone Firestone North American Holdings Ltd. The North American subsidiary of Bridgestone Corporation is now named Bridgestone Americas, Inc., and its tire division is Bridgestone Americas Tire Operations, LLC.

In April 2012, Bridgestone Americas opened up its new Bridgestone Americas Technical Center in Akron. The $100 million facility, located just down the street from the former headquarters, houses 450 employees.

In June 2022, Bridgestone opened up its $21 million Advanced Tire Production Center, replacing the Firestone Advanced Tire Works Plant at the original 1910 headquarters. The new building produces racing tires for the NTT IndyCar Series and manufactures all Firestone Firehawk racing tires. It is the first new tire plant in Akron in more than 70 years. Bridgestone also opened a $6 million passenger tire test track adjacent to the facility in Autumn 2022. Bridgestone has invested more than $125 million in its Akron operations since 2012.

== Bridgestone's global locations ==
Bridgestone has major manufacturing plants in many countries around the world. As of 1 April 2011, Bridgestone has 47 tire plants, 29 tire-related plants, 19 raw materials plants, 89 diversified product plants, 4 technical centers, and 11 proving grounds globally.

Some of the major plants are located in:

Asia/Oceania	Europe	Americas	Middle East/Africa
Australia	Belgium	Argentina	South Africa
China	France	Brazil	Cameroon (from 2020)
India	Hungary	Canada	Kenya (from 2023)
Indonesia	Italy	Colombia	
Japan	Poland	Costa Rica	
New Zealand	Portugal	Mexico	
Pakistan	Spain	United States	
Thailand	Turkey	Venezuela	
Thailand	Estonia (from 2024)	Bolivia (from 2027)	
Vietnam		Puerto Rico (from 2025)	
Myanmar (from 2021)
South Korea (from 2022)
Philippines

In January 2026, it was announced that Bridgestone had agreed to sell its tyre reinforcement business in China and Thailand to Bekaert for €60 million. The sale forms part of Bridgestone's strategy to enhance competitiveness and includes a long-term tyre cord supply agreement.

=== Australia ===
Bridgestone Australia is headquartered in Eastwood, an inner-southern suburb of Adelaide, South Australia.

Beginning as the SA Rubber Mills in 1939, Bridgestone took over the Australian plants which were at that time operated by the Uniroyal Tyre Company in 1980. Bridgestone Australia had a major manufacturing tire factory in Australia: located in Salisbury, a northern suburb of Adelaide (this plant was eventually decommissioned in April 2011). Bridgestone has State Offices in all states of Australia, and has a large number of retail outlets across the country.

In 2000 Bridgestone Australia Ltd. purchased the BANDAG Retreading plant and its operations in Australia. Bandag Manufacturing Pty Limited has 35 franchised dealers across Australia, New Zealand, Fiji, Papua New Guinea and Nouméa. Bandag Manufacturing Pty Limited is a wholly owned subsidiary of Bridgestone Australia Limited, and operates under license to Bandag Incorporated. In 2006 Bridgestone purchased Bandag Incorporated, which is now a subsidiary of Bridgestone Corporation.

From the purchase in 1981, the Australian operations of Bridgestone have been run as a publicly listed company on the Australian Stock exchange. Bridgestone Corporation has maintained a majority share holding. As of mid-2007 the Australian operation was delisted from the Australian Stock exchange and became a solely owned Division of Bridgestone Corporation (pending minority shareholder approval as per Australian Corporate Law).

Following the cancellation on Friday, 11 May 2007, of all shares held by minority shareholders, Bridgestone Australia Ltd. became a wholly owned subsidiary of Bridgestone Corporation of Japan. The selective capital reduction and subsequent privatisation which cost $49 million was approved and completed. Bridgestone Australia Ltd. was delisted from the ASX on 30 May 2007.

=== Europe ===
Bridgestone EU has its head office in Brussels, Belgium, and was set up in 1990 as Bridgestone/Firestone Europe SA. Before that, a representative office in Belgium set up in 1972 and sales subsidiary companies and importers in each countries were selling products imported from Japan. There are 7 production plants in the region and a 32 hectare research and development centre near Rome, Italy. The company distributes more than 25 million tires a year through 17 national sales subsidiaries and 2 distributors. They directly employ over 12,000 people with Mr. Tsuda as CEO.

At present there are national headquarters in the following locations: Vienna, Austria; Prague, Czech Republic; Hinnerup, Denmark; Vantaa, Finland; Fresnes, France; Bad Homburg, Germany; Athens, Greece; Budapest, Hungary; Dublin, Ireland; Milan, Italy; Moerdijk, Netherlands; Oslo, Norway; Warsaw, Poland; Alcochete, Portugal; Madrid, Spain; Sundsvall, Sweden; Spreitenbach, Switzerland; Istanbul, Turkiye (manufacturing in Kocaeli) and Warwick, UK.

Bridgestone EU runs a continent-wide scheme called Truckpoint wherein fleets can take their vehicles to any Bridgestone approved garage throughout Europe and get Bridgestone specialist work carried out on their tires.

There are no Bridgestone factories in the United Kingdom but there is a technical bay at which tyres returned by dissatisfied customers are inspected in Coventry.

The plant at Ulyanovsk, Russia and the marketing office in Moscow were sold in December 2023 as Bridgestone withdrew from the Russian market, following the Russian invasion of Ukraine.

=== North America ===
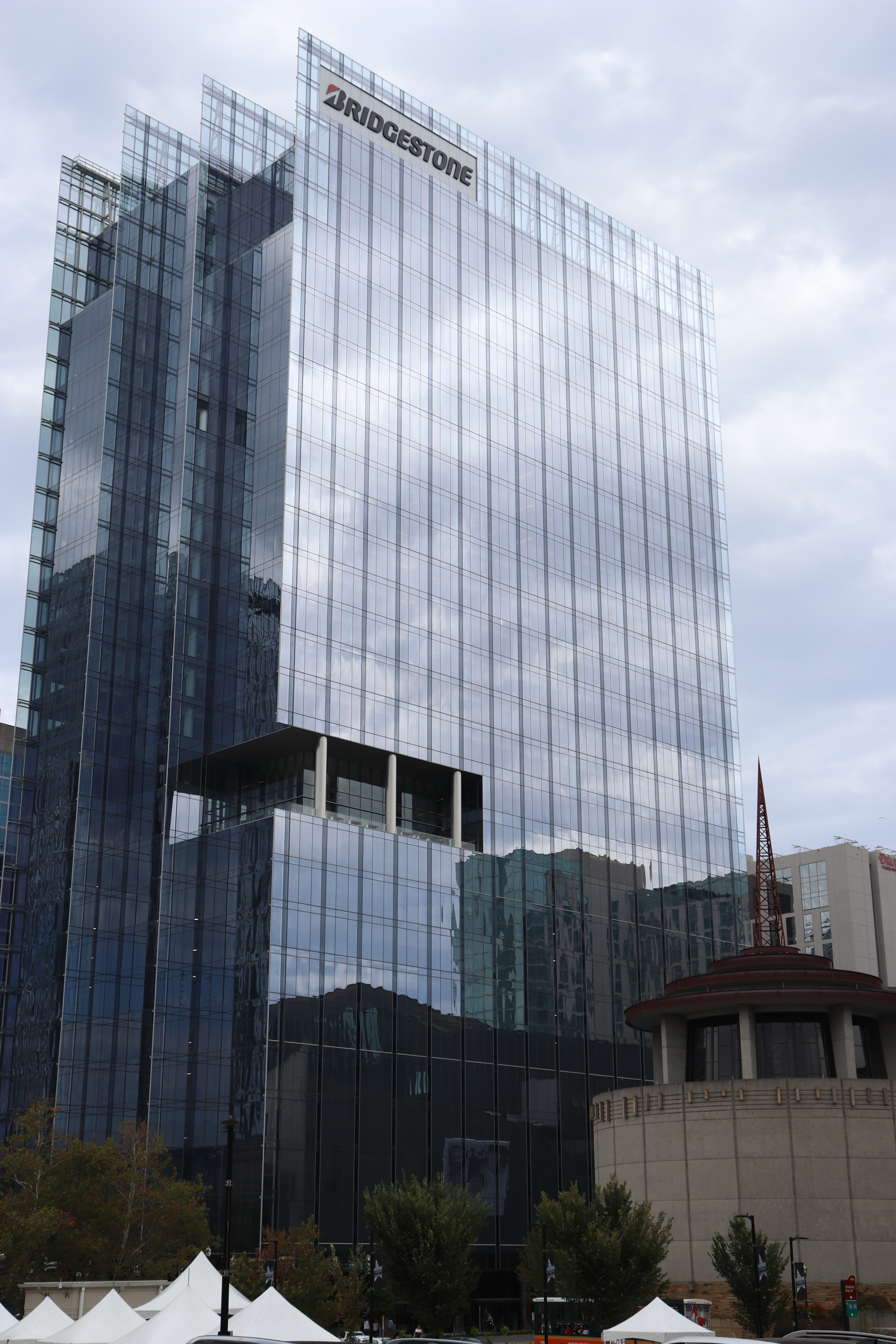
Bridgestone Tower in Nashville

As part of reinforcement plans, the company purchased a plant in Tennessee from the Firestone Tire and Rubber Company, its first manufacturing plant in North America, and started the production of radial tires for trucks and buses in 1983. Bridgestone also has a steel cord plant in Clarksville, Tennessee, named Bridgestone Metalpha. Metalpha is currently ranked as the top provider in the global steel cord market.

In May 1988, a takeover bid of America's No. 2 tire manufacturer, Akron, Ohio–based Firestone Tire and Rubber Company, was successful, and Firestone was placed under the Bridgestone umbrella as a subsidiary company. This purchase brought a large number of Firestone global production sites into the Bridgestone organization. These sites included North America, Central and South America, Europe, New Zealand and other locations. Bridgestone also commenced production in Turkey. In 1992, the company established regional corporate offices in Europe and the Americas.

Nashville-based Bridgestone Americas, Inc. (BSA) is the American subsidiary of the Bridgestone Corporation. BSA and its subsidiaries develop, manufacture and market Bridgestone, Firestone, and associate brand tires for consumers, automotive and commercial vehicle original equipment manufacturers, and those in the agricultural, forestry and mining industries. The companies also produce air springs, synthetic rubber, and industrial fibers and textiles. Bridgestone Retail Operations, LLC (BSRO), a subsidiary of Bridgestone Americas, operates one of the largest chains of company-owned auto care and tire stores in the United States, under the Firestone Complete Auto Care, Tires Plus, Hibdon Tires Plus, and Wheel Works brands. As of 2024, BSRO operated more than 2,200 stores and employed nearly 22,000 people.

In November 2010, ASA Automotive Systems Inc. was selected by the Consumer Tire Sales division of Bridgestone Americas Tire Operations, LLC (BATO) as the software provider for their North American consumer dealers to supply the industry's leading 'All-in-One' Point-of-Sale, Accounting and Inventory shop management software.

In 2014, Bridgestone Americas Tire Operations (BATO) unveiled its newly rebranded GCR Tires & Service division. With one of the largest network of commercial stores across the country, GCR's reach extends nationwide. The letters of GCR reflect the last names of the original company founders Balie Griffith, Harold Crawford and Perry Rose.

In 2015, Bridgestone Americas Inc. signed a deal giving its dealers the option to install digital air calibration machines from Excel Tire Gauge Inc. in their stores. The digital air calibration machines streamline the tire inflation process by automatically inflating or deflating tires.

In 2017, Bridgestone Americas consolidated many of their business units into a single building in downtown Nashville, Bridgestone Tower. Nearly 2,000 employees work in the new skyscraper, nestled between the Country Music Hall of Fame and the Schermerhorn Symphony Center.

In April 2020, due to demand by essential service providers during COVID-19 pandemic in Tennessee, Bridgestone Americas announced plans to restart its North American commercial tire plants as well as its North American Firestone Industrial Products and Firestone Building Products manufacturing facilities.

== Motorsport ==
=== Formula racing ===
Bridgestone started to invest in motorsport in the 1980s by developing race tires for feeder series like Formula 2, Formula 3, Formula Ford, Formula Opel Lotus and karting.

In order to increase the Firestone subsidiary's brand awareness, Bridgestone Firestone NAH Ltd, re-entered the Firestone brand into CART open-wheel racing in 1995 to challenge Goodyear. The tires proved better and Goodyear left the series for 2000. Since then, Firestone has been the single tire provider for the successor Champ Car World Series, the IndyCar Series and its feeder series Indy NXT.

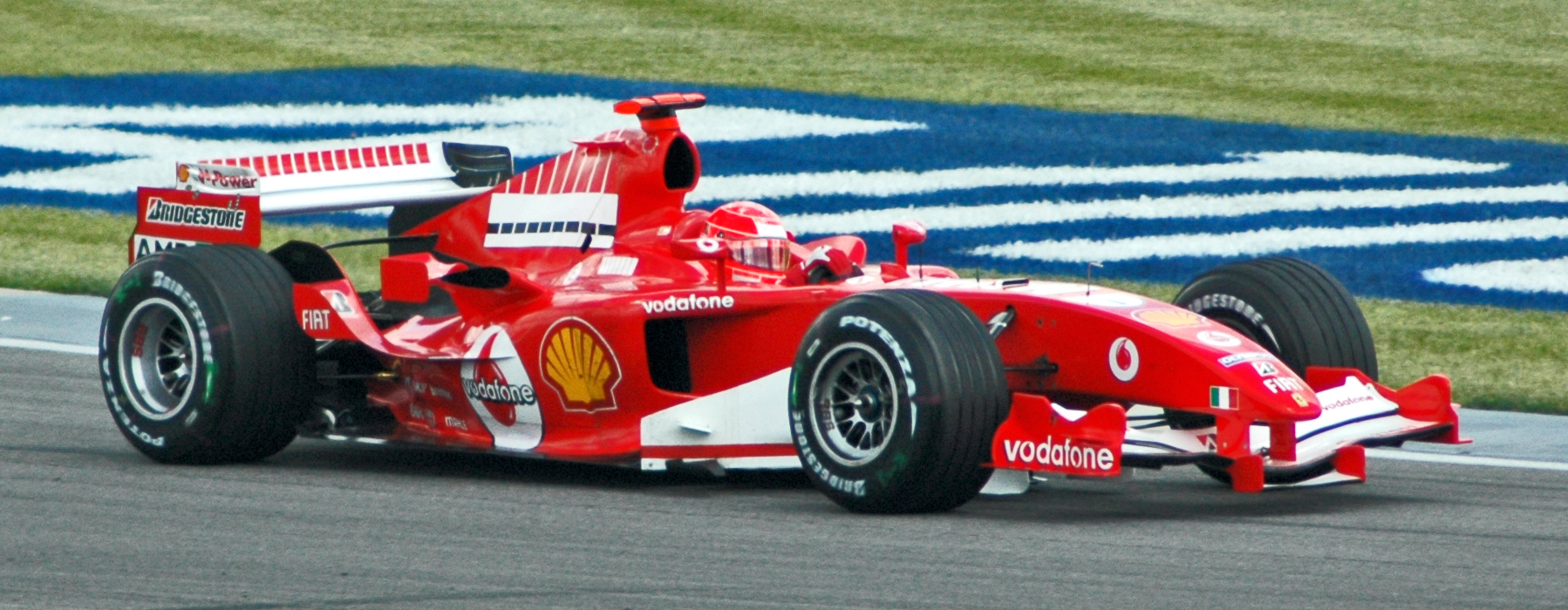
Michael Schumacher in practice at the 2005 United States Grand Prix. Note the Bridgestone branding on the rear wing endplate, the Bridgestone's B logo on the front wing, just under the nosecone and on the side winglet just before the rear wheel

Bridgestone used to supply tires in Formula One starting 1997 and ended 2010 Formula One season, although the company one-off produced Formula One tires at the 1976 and 1977 Japanese Grand Prix for Japanese entrants such as Kazuyoshi Hoshino's Heros Racing and Kojima.

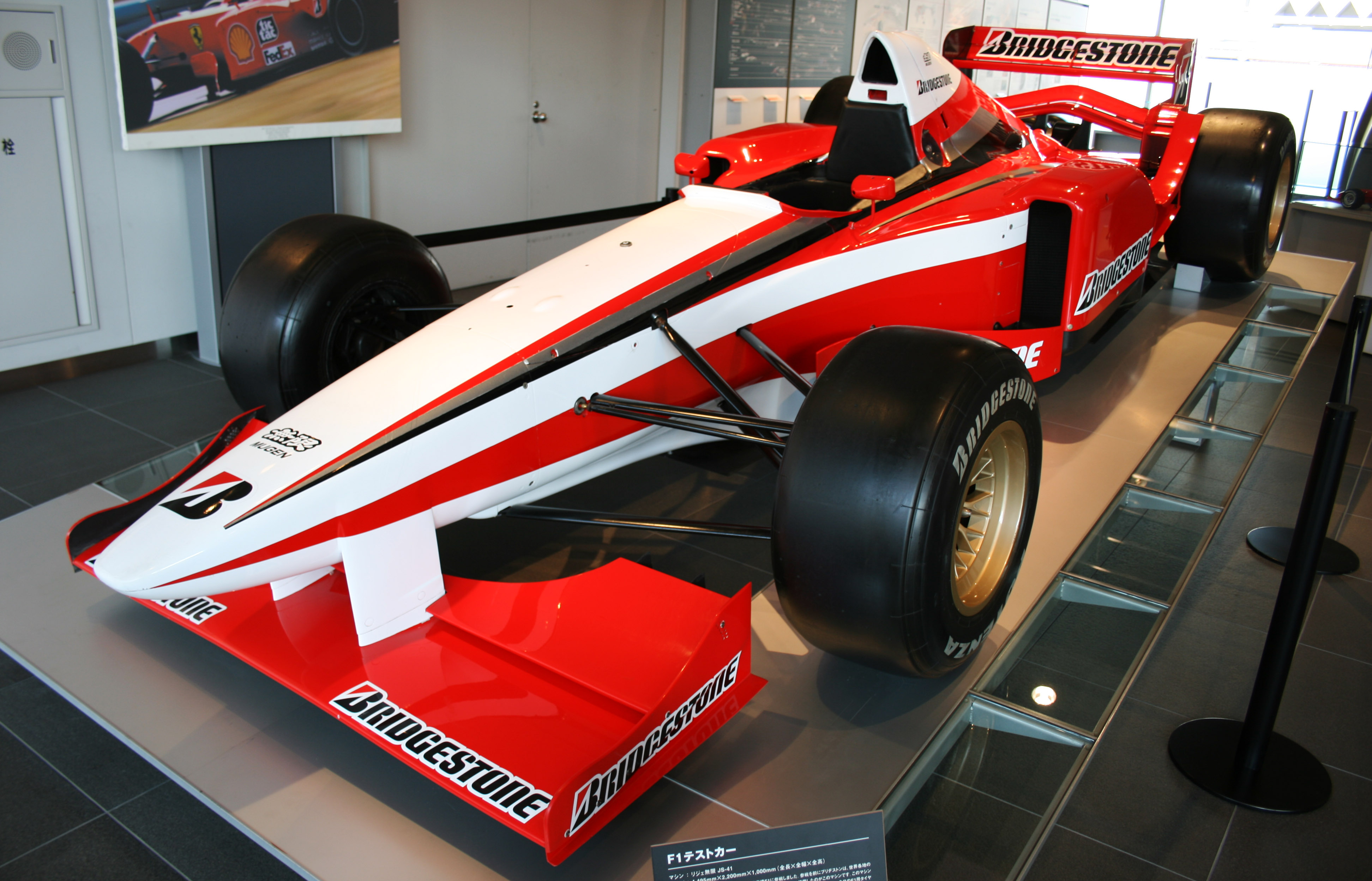
Bridgestone used a Ligier JS41 as test bed during 1996

The Japanese company decided to supply tires for Formula One in 1995, backed up by the CEO Yoichiro Kaizaki, aiming to improve Bridgestone's name value in the European market which was greatly inferior compared with their archrivals, Michelin. Though it was scheduled to enter the championship in the 1998 season at first, this was brought forward to 1997 because the engineering section led by Hirohide Hamashima had quickly advanced development. Thus, Hiroshi Yasukawa, the general manager of Motorsport Department, also made the best use of the experience and networks in Europe since the Bridgestone's European F2 era (1981–1984) and constructed logistics for Formula One at once.

The first title was acquired right away in the second year, 1998 by Mika Häkkinen and McLaren–Mercedes. And Bridgestone users took five Drivers' Championship titles and five Constructors' Championship titles (1998, 2001–2004) for the period that competed with Goodyear (1997–1998) and Michelin (2001–2006). Especially, cooperation with Scuderia Ferrari and Michael Schumacher functioned well in this period.

From 2008 to 2010 Bridgestone was due to be the sole tire supplier to the FIA Formula One World Championship. However, because Michelin chose to conclude its Formula One tire programme at the end of the 2006 season, all teams used Bridgestone tires from the 2007 season to the 2010 Formula One season.

On 2 November 2009, Bridgestone announced that they would not be renewing their contract to supply tires to Formula One teams after 2010. The company said it was "addressing the impact of the continuing evolution of the business environment". Pirelli announced in June 2010 that it would serve as sole supplier for tires in the 2011 season.

Tire Record Table – Races Won
Pos	Tire	Seasons	Starts	Wins	Only supplier	WC Drivers	WC Constr.
3	(Japan) Bridgestone	1976 – 2010	244	175	116	11	11
6	(United States) Firestone	1950–1975	121	49	11	3	3

=== Sports car and touring car ===
In the 1980s and 1990s, Bridgestone provided tires to the Le Mans sport prototypes of teams Nismo and TOM's, backed by Japanese automobile manufacturers Nissan and Toyota respectively. In the early 1990s, Bridgestone expanded to Mercedes-AMG, which entered the DTM and later Le Mans and the FIA GT Championship. The brand left international sports car racing in 2000, but remains as one of the main suppliers in the Super GT series. Since April 2023, Bridgestone became the main tire supplier for the Super Taikyu championship series replacing Hankook, which supplied its tires briefly until forced to exit the series due to the latter's Daejeon plant fire.

=== Motorcycling ===
In 2002, Bridgestone entered the Grand Prix motorcycle racing's main class MotoGP. From 2009 to 2015, it was the exclusive tire supplier of the championship and reached the milestone of 100 MotoGP victories in 2012. Nine-time World Champion Valentino Rossi was 'Bridgestone Tyre Adviser' having won two MotoGP titles on Bridgestone tires in 2008 and 2009. In May 2014, Bridgestone announced they would leave Moto GP at the end of the 2015 season.

=== Formula E ===
Bridgestone will replace Hankook as the official tire supplier for the FIA Formula E World Championship for its fourth-generation car, the Formula E Gen4, from the 2026–27 season onwards. The company will supply dry and wet weather tires to the series, a first for Formula E after the series used all-weather tires ever since its inception.

== Sponsorship ==
Bridgestone was the Official Tire of the Olympic Games, a partnership that ended at the end of 2024. In 2010, Bridgestone acquired the naming rights to the home venue of the NHL's Nashville Predators calling it Bridgestone Arena. They were also the title sponsor for Copa Libertadores, the top competition for South American club football, from 2013 to 2017, and Copa Sudamericana from 2011 to 2013.

== Diversified products ==
The predecessors of Bridgestone began making diversified products in the 1930s, soon after they started making tires. Today, Bridgestone diversified operations encompass automotive components, industrial products, polyurethane foam products, construction materials, parts and materials for electronic equipment, bicycles and sporting goods. Diversified business generates about one-fourth of total sales in the Bridgestone Group.

Automotive parts are an especially large line of business for Bridgestone in diversified operations. Bridgestone supplies automakers with vibration-isolating components, such as engine mounts. Bridgestone also supplies air springs for trucks, automobiles and train carriages. Bridgestone market aluminium wheels and other automotive accessories, too.

=== Industrial products ===
Bridgestone's industrial products span a vast range, including polyurethane foam for automotive seats and interiors, for bedding and furniture and for insulation and sealing in appliances and buildings; water hoses; marine hoses for loading and unloading oil tankers; specialty precision hose products, such as wire-blade hose for construction equipment and machine tools; conveyor belts; and rubber tracks for crawler tractors. Additionally, they make retreaded tires for aircraft. Their corporate headquarters for the Bridgestone Aircraft tire division is located in Miami, Florida.

The Bridgestone product line in construction and civil engineering materials is similarly broad. Bridgestone supply Multi-Rubber Bearings for installing in foundations to protect buildings from earthquakes, inflatable rubber dams for managing waterways (no longer manufactured – 2008), marine fenders for protecting wharves, additives for pavement, waterproofing sheet, rubberized ceiling and roofing materials, panel tanks for storing water, bath fixtures and residential flooring, air and water systems.

Bridgestone's line of products for electronic equipment includes precision rollers for office machines and functional films for solar cells and plasma displays. In sporting goods, Bridgestone market golf balls and clubs and tennis balls and rackets. Bridgestone's line of bicycles is Japan's most extensive – see above information re. Anchor Cycles.

=== Bridgestone Commercial Services Group (Bandag) ===
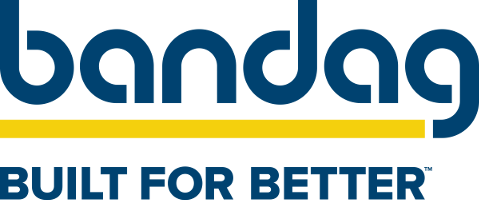
Bandag's logo

On 5 December 2006, Bridgestone Americas and Bandag, Inc. announced a merger agreement whereby Bridgestone would acquire Muscatine, Iowa–based Bandag, Inc., a leading truck tire re-treader that was founded in 1957 and had over 900 franchised dealers worldwide at the time. In announcing the merger, Bridgestone's president in Tokyo explained:

Higher fuel prices are prompting customers to cut costs [by using retreads]. It takes time and costs to develop this size of business. We were able to get that all at once.

The transaction was valued at approximately US$1.05 billion. On 31 May 2007, the agreement was consummated and Bridgestone Americas acquired the outstanding shares of Bandag stock for US$50.75 per share. The unit was renamed Bridgestone Bandag, LLC and Saul Solomon was appointed to the position of chairman, CEO and president. Previously, Solomon served as vice president and general counsel of BSAH. In the four years following the acquisition, Bandag's headquarters remained in Muscatine, although some processes and functions were consolidated and/or transferred to other facilities. In November 2010, corporate headquarters were moved to Nashville. In May 2011, the unit was renamed Bridgestone Commercial Services Group, eliminating the name "Bandag."

=== Bicycles ===
Kabuki head badge

The Bridgestone Cycle Co Ltd. originated in 1949. It offers bicycles under its own brand and under the Anchor brand.

At one time, Bridgestone marketed bicycles under the name Kabuki.

The U.S. marketing director of the Bicycle division, Grant Petersen, developed a reputation for resisting popular trends in the bicycle industry and instead followed his own personal philosophy of building dependable and comfortable bicycles. Peterson applied this approach to Rivendell Bicycle Works after Bridgestone stopped marketing bicycles in the U.S.

The company was an innovator in the emerging mountain bike scene, designing nimbler mountain bikes with shorter chain-stays and steeper frame angles than other popular bikes.

Until 1986, Bridgestone models were numbered in multiples of 100, with the higher numbers indicating a higher end bike. The entry level road bike in 1986, for example, may have been the Bridgestone 100, while the Bridgestone 700 would have been a competition level race bike. Beginning in 1987 there was a change, with model designations consisting of two letters followed by a numeral. The letters indicated the type of bike, and the number indicated the position in the product lineup. The numbering was also reversed, with the smaller numbers indicating a higher position in the product line. For example, the RB-1 would have been the top-of-the-line road bike, followed by the RB-2, RB-3, etc.

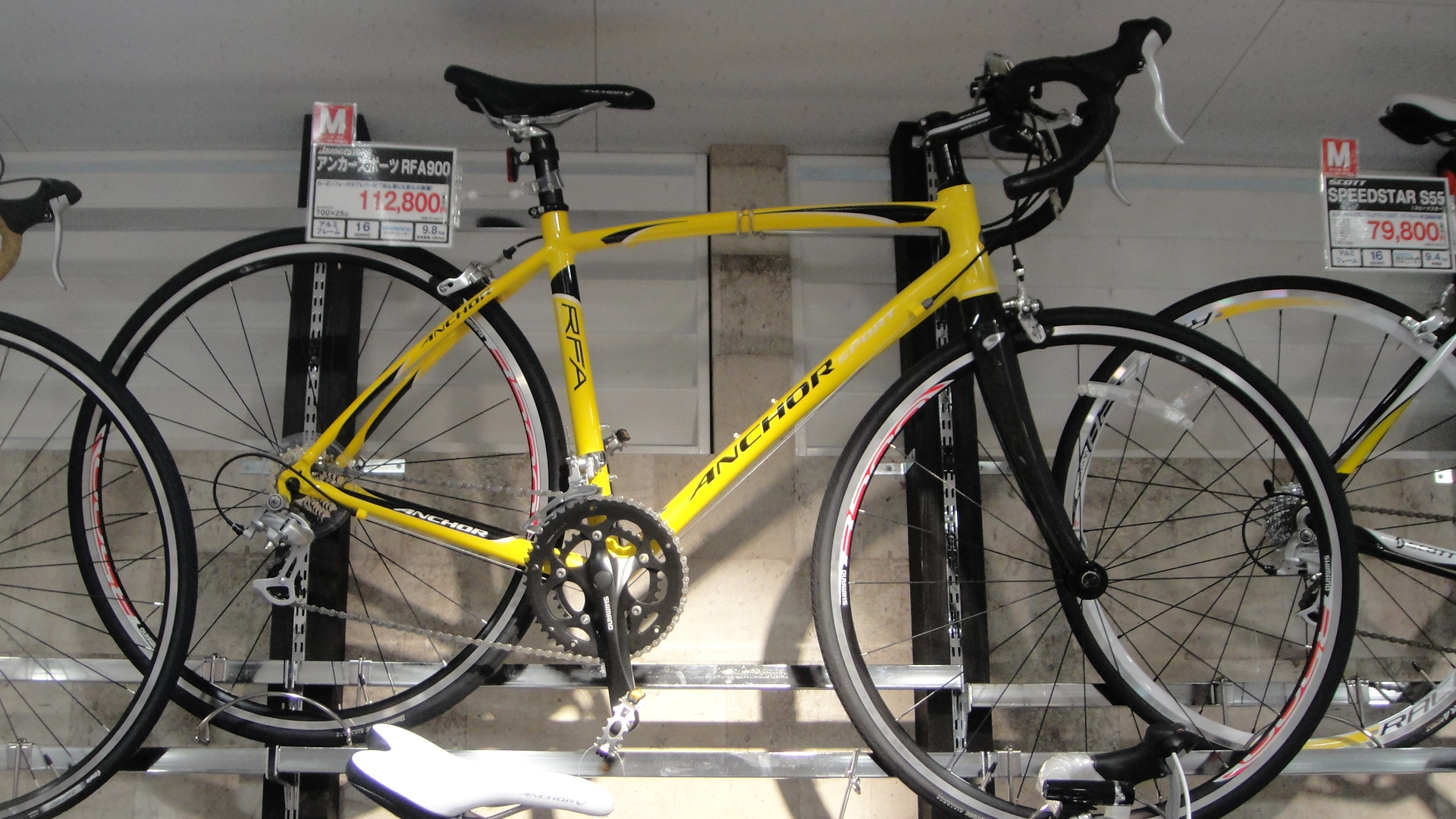
Anchor brand bicycle in a Japanese store

Bridgestone is currently building frames in Japan for keirin track racing under Nihon Jitensha Shinkokai approved standards. It is currently producing non-NJS frames for the Japanese market as well.

In Japan, it is known as a manufacturer of utility, mountain and (under the brand name Anchor) road racing bikes.

Bridgestone has also collaborated with Alex Moulton to produce the Bridgestone Moulton Bicycle and marketed its own folding bicycle, the Bridgestone Picnica.

Bridgestone also released a range of BMX Bicycles in 1981–1982 known as the MKI & MKII.

=== Motorcycles ===
Bridgestone motorcycles were a division of the company that produced mopeds and motorcycles from 1952 to 1970. Initially producing power assisted bicycles, the division moved on to producing mopeds and then motorcycles. The motorcycles were technologically advanced and powered by two-stroke engines. The high technical specification resulted in the machines being more expensive compared to other manufacturers models. Production was stopped in 1970 to protect the supply of tires to other manufacturers.

=== Bridgestone Aircraft Tire ===
Bridgestone Aircraft Tire (USA) is a manufacturer of aircraft tires as well as retread servicing. Bridgestone Americas Holdings announced in May 2006 that it would be moving its Miami, Florida aviation operation to its new 160,000-square-foot (15,000 m^{2}) facility located in Mayodan, North Carolina, this move is expected to be completed by mid-2007 and will create approximately 95 new jobs. CEO and President of Bridgestone Aircraft Tire (USA) Joe Rayna is quoted as saying; "This move allows us to continue to prepare for a changing market, both in demand and in product mix, New modern aircraft, such as the Boeing 787 Dreamliner and Airbus A380, arrive fitted with new Bridgestone technology aircraft tires, and this new facility will complement that technology". Bridgestone Aircraft Tire (USA) has been a major supplier of aircraft tires and retreads to the aircraft industry for over 70 years and has sister aviation facilities in Tokyo, Hong Kong and Belgium.

=== Golf products ===
Bridgestone Golf is a division of Bridgestone, and is the brand name under which Bridgestone's Golfing Products are marketed. Bridgestone has been producing golf-related products since 1935. The Golf division of Bridgestone currently produces clubs, balls and accessories. Along with technical developments in tire technology came breakthroughs in golf ball technology that have led Bridgestone to be the number one golf ball producer in Japan.

Design and production of golf clubs followed in 1972.

Bridgestone has global coverage of its golfing products with major divisions in USA (Bridgestone Golf USA), Australia (Bridgestone Golf Australia) and Korea (Sokio Corporation).

=== Dolphin artificial caudal fin ===
In 2003, the caudal fin of Fuji, a Bottlenose dolphin bred at the Okichan Theater of Okinawa Churaumi Aquarium, was necrotic, necessitating the removal of 75% of the fin which made swimming impossible. The Okinawa Churaumi Aquarium started a project to develop the world's first artificial dolphin caudal fin in cooperation with Bridgestone to replace Fuji's fin. In the early days, the artificial caudal fin could not be installed well because it could not withstand the swimming of dolphins, but aquariums made improvements and succeeded in installing the artificial caudal fin of the dolphin.

In 2010, it was also installed in Pacific white-sided dolphin named Lanan, who was bred in Notojima Aquarium, and succeeded in installing the second artificial caudal fin in the world.

== Bridgestone e-Reporter ==
Bridgestone e-reporter is a pan-European competition for aspiring young sports journalists, open to all students aged 18–30, who are in full-time education.

The 2008 competition was officially launched on 1 February 2008 with the deadline for entries at 12.00 GMT on 31 March 2008. As of 2009, Bridgestone has not held further editions of the e-Reporter competition. However it may return in a different form in the future.

Bridgestone was the sole tire supplier for the GP2 series, an open-wheeled racing championship that is widely regarded as the feeder series for Formula One.

== Controversies ==
After Bridgestone purchased Firestone in 1988, cost-cutting measures led to tread separations in tires manufactured in Firestone plants in the 1990s.

In 2008, Bridgestone ran an advert during the Super Bowl XLII showing a car driver avoiding several hazards while driving at night, including threatening to run down Richard Simmons, who was embodying a homophobic sissy stereotype, with Ad Age's critic Bob Garfield describing the advert as "grounded in homophobia".

In September 2011, Bridgestone pleaded guilty to bribing Latin American officials and bid rigging, and agreed to pay a $28 million fine to resolve criminal charges.

In February 2014, Bridgestone agreed to a $425 million fine imposed by the United States Department of Justice for price fixing and bid rigging in the automotive parts industry. The company said it regretted the actions that led to the plea deal and said it would take disciplinary action against certain employees. One executive and two other former executives were indicted for conspiracy.

In February 2022, shortly after outsourcing the majority of its IT employees, Bridgestone Americas was hacked. This resulted in the theft of company data, manufacturing plants in North and South America to be closed, and production to be halted.

== See also ==
- Bridgestone Arena
- Bridgestone Golf
- Bridgestone Picnica
- Bridgestone Tower
