= Britten and Brülightly =

British graphic novel written by Hannah Berry

- Front cover of Britten and Brülightly, by Hannah Berry (April 2008)

Publication information
- Publisher: Jonathan Cape
- Publication date: 3 April 2008
- Main character: Fernández Britten

Creative team
- Written by: Hannah Berry
- Artist: Hannah Berry

Britten and Brülightly is a British graphic novel written and illustrated by Hannah Berry, and published by Random House under their Jonathan Cape imprint on 3 April 2008.

== Plot ==
Fernandez Britten, private investigator, would rather be called a 'private researcher'. Tired of years spent dragging people's unpleasant secrets to the surface, the only thing which keeps him going is the hope of one day unearthing a happy resolution along with the truth.

In that vain hope, he takes on the case of suicide Berni Kudos, whose fiancée Charlotte Maughton refuses to believe he would ever have killed himself.

== Impact ==
Award-winning comic author Bryan Talbot named Britten and Brülightly as one of his three "Best of 2008", calling Hannah Berry 'an exceptional talent' and 'one to watch'.

In its round-up of the year's graphic novels, The Times called Britten and Brülightly 'effort-lessly Book of the Year', praising Hannah Berry's 'perfect marriage of soaringly beautiful drawing and writing'.

== Inspirations ==
Author Hannah Berry has stated that her hand-painted art drew inspiration from the French comic-book tradition, quoting Nicolas de Crécy's Belleville Rendez-Vous as a particular favourite, while the story and the style of the art itself made use of film noir techniques, particularly those of '‘neo-noir’ types like David Fincher, Christopher Nolan and the Coen brothers, and ‘old-school noir’ Carol Reed.
