= Bridgestone Picnica =

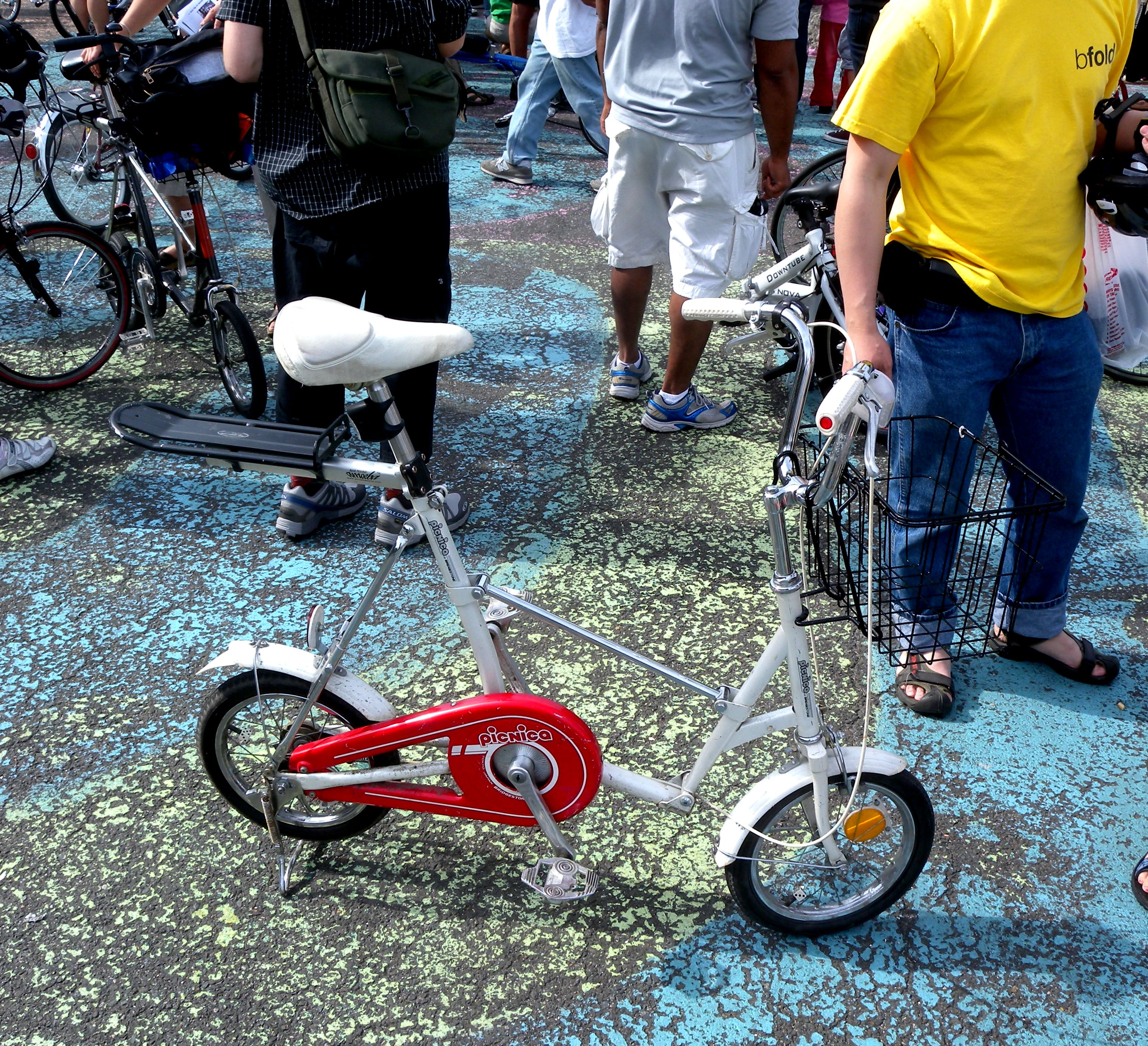
On display in New York

The Bridgestone Picnica (Japanese: Burijisuton Pikunika: ブリヂストン 「ピクニカ」) line of collapsible bikes, some models featuring belt-drives, were introduced in the early 1980s and carried in the Bridgestone Cycle USA catalogs from 1985 through 1990. It weighs 29 pounds, and belt-drive models use a tooth-belt drive like auto timing belts and Harley-Davidson drive belts, along with a novel two-part chainring that increases belt tension with increasing load. In April 1987, Popular Mechanics described Bridgestone's Beltrex system as follows: "Unlike the belt-drive motorcycles, which can slide the rear wheel back to keep the belt taut, the Beltrex uses a floating pulley that's cogged to the drive gear. Tension on the pedal cranks drives the floating pulley forward, taking up belt slack and preventing tooth slippage."

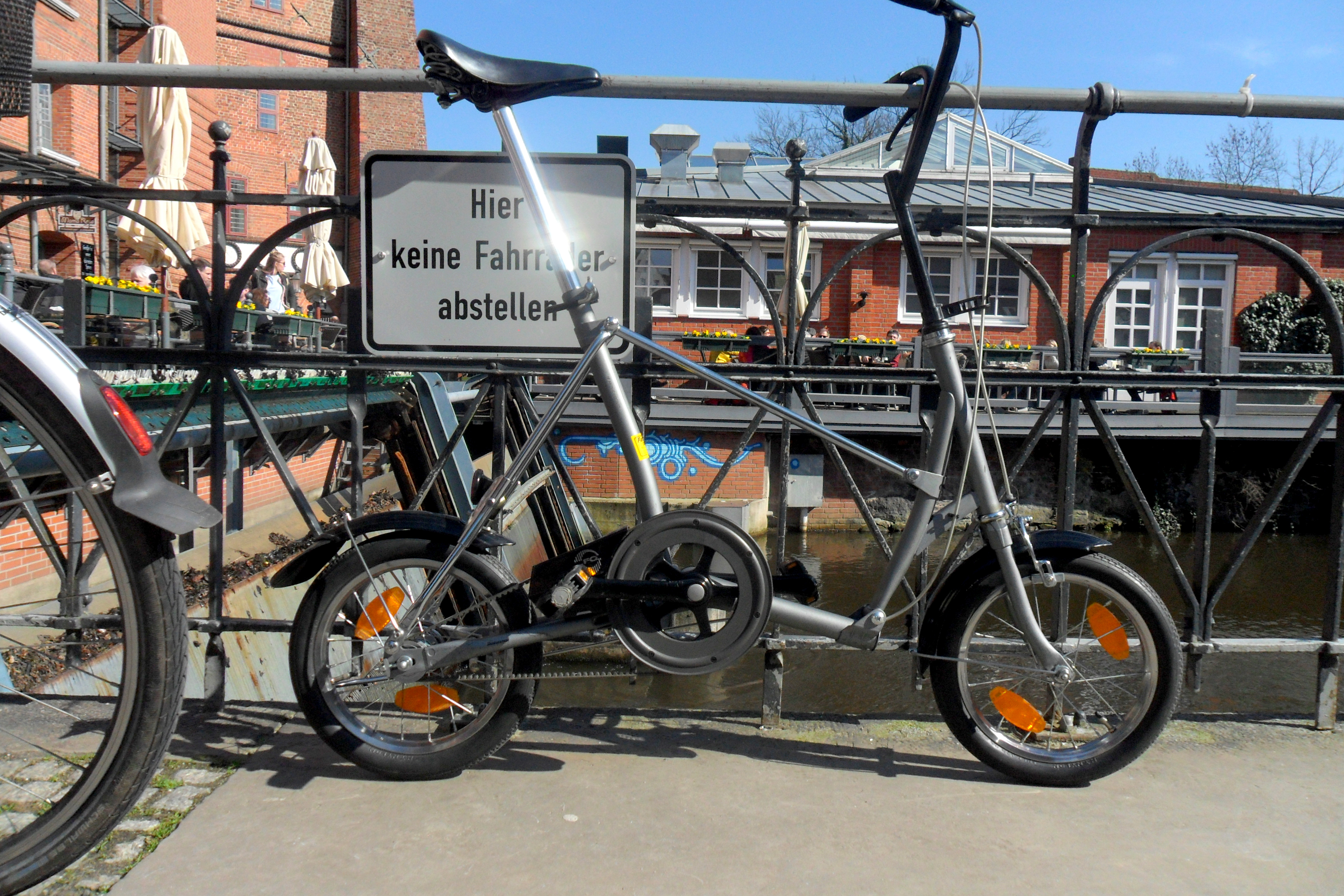
A limited number of Picnica folding bikes were imported to Europe. This 1990 belt-drive model in Germany features an extended seat post.

The Picnica is a folding bicycle, and part of the appeal of the belt drive is cleanliness. It is a small wheel bicycle, so belt tension may be less than on a bicycle with standard-size wheels.

The folding mechanism is extremely simple, which accounts for the fact that the Picnica was marketed as the "One-touch Picnica" (Japanese: ワンタッチピクニカ). In a review, the Picnica folding mechanism was described as a "case of the frame collapsing backwards on itself, with the handlebars and seat post falling to the top of the rear wheel. To this end, the main part of the frame is a quadrilateral with a pivot at each corner, and a rear triangle made collapsible by hinged seat stays. It's those seat stays that hold everything in place. In the riding position they're straight and rigid, as on any bike. The upper part of each seat stay is locked in a retaining channel by spring pressure; squeeze the upper seat stays inwards and they pop out of their channels, and the hinge 'unlocks'. The upper and lower seat stays then fold over as the main frame folds – the whole bike collapses under its own weight."

The Picnica was apparently commercially successful, but was offered mainly in Japan, where it sold for around 35 000 Japanese yen. The belt-drive version retailed for 45 000 yen.

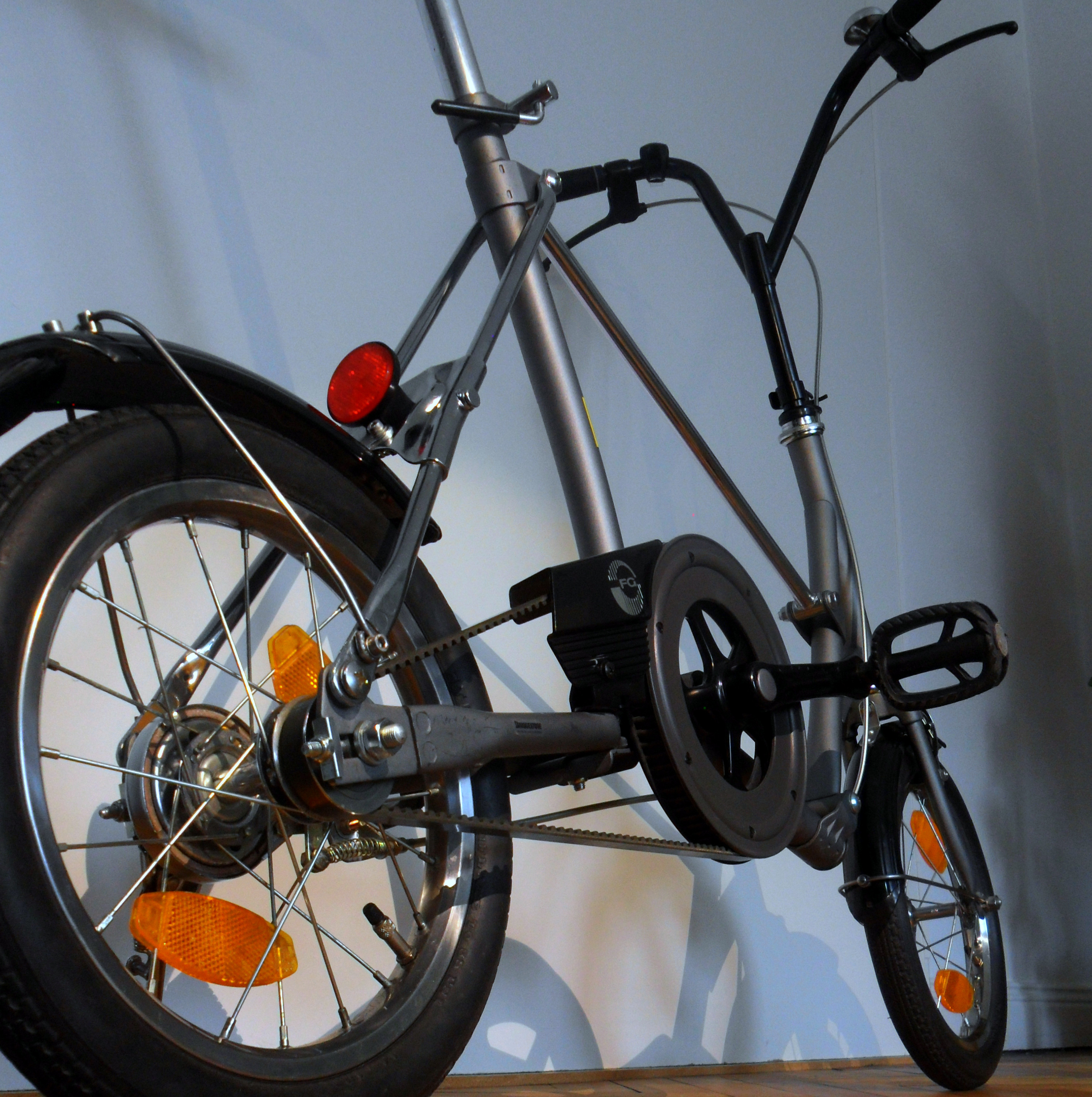
According to the 1985 Bridgestone catalog, the Picnica OPC-14B was the first folding bike with a belt drive.

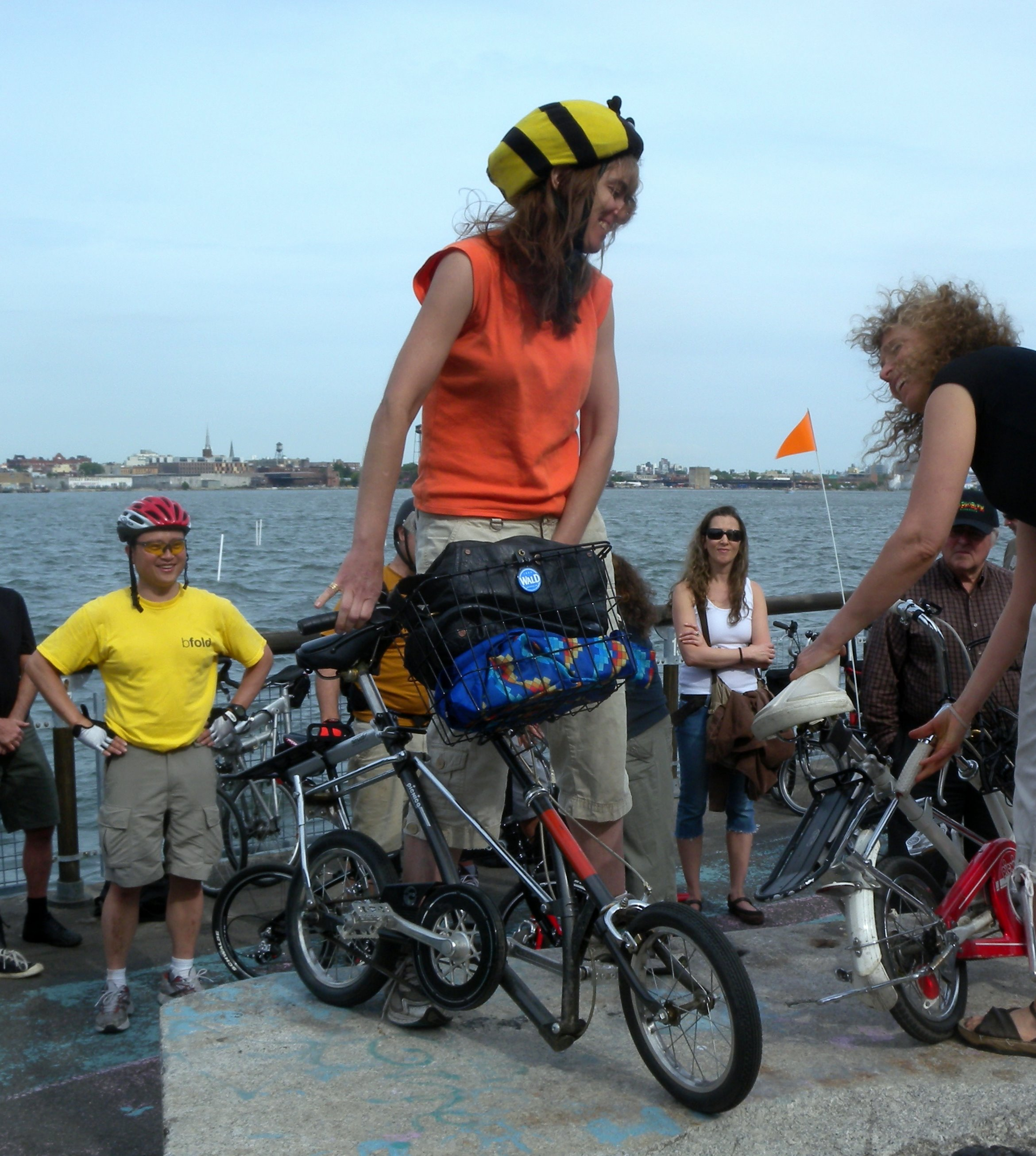
A Picnica bicycle being folded
