= Erich von Götha =

British illustrator and comic book artist (born 1930)

Robin Ray (born 1930), better known by the pseudonym of Erich von Götha, is a British illustrator and comic book artist.

As well as using the pseudonym Erich von Götha, Ray has also worked under another name, Baldur Grimm, as an alter ego. Ray has gained fame with his erotic and, above all, sadomasochist content. He has had solo exhibitions in the Mondo Bizzarro Gallery in Bologna, titled Sweat Tears & Reflections and In "Larmes d'Eros" in Paris on the publication of "The Secret Notebooks of Janice". He is represented by Talisman Fine Art who also distribute prints of his work.

== Life and career ==
Robin Ray was born in Wimbledon, Surrey in 1930. He studied drawing and painting for four years at St Martins art school in London and enjoyed a career in London advertising agencies as designer and copywriter. He took time off for three years to teach graphic design at Ealing School of Art. A chance meeting with the English sex therapist, consultant, campaigner, writer, and former adult model Tuppy Owens led to the "Sex Maniac's Diary", a remarkable and successful publication which amazingly sold mainly to women. Their publisher suggested to him creating an erotic comic "Torrid" which appeared irregularly during the 1980s. "Torrid" was little more than a hobby and he enjoyed total freedom at a time when Swinging London was in its first flush, a fact which influenced all of his stories. He ceased when he discovered the publishers were selling the strips that appeared in the first 16 issues of Torrid and were published later in the French magazines YES and Bédé Adult without his knowledge. This publisher, Lionel Roc, then took up the task of vigorously promoting his work. He became famous as an artist with the works Conte à Rebours (for YES), a sci-fi story which was rendered curiously incomprehensible by the circumstances of the translation, and Crimes et Délits (the last work succeeding Georges Lévis) for which he illustrated the section on Rasputin.

However, his most famous work is The Troubles of Janice, set in the time of the Marquis de Sade. It has appeared in four albums; the first album appeared in 1980, and they represented a close collaboration with the French campaigning writer, historian and collector Bernard Joubert. A luxury edition of all four was published in 2008 by Dynamite. English versions of "Janice" and "Twenty", his other 'serial' story were published in the Noughties by the Erotic Print Society. Since the 80s, he has produced many erotic paintings for friends and fans and has several books published by "Larmes d'Eros" in Paris. He continues to produce prints and execute commissions of an erotic nature usually with a mythological theme.

In 2016, Dynamite published a comprehensive biography which revealed, with much humour and many illustrations, the facts (many of which had until then been weirdly transformed) of his life and work. It was written by his collaborator, translator and old friend, Joubert.
