= The Bond of Saint Marcel =

Publication information
- Publisher: Archaia Studios Press
- Schedule: Irregular
- Format: Limited series
- Genre: Horror
- Publication date: July 2008
- No. of issues: 1 out of 6 (as of August 2009)

Creative team
- Created by: Jennifer Quintenz
- Written by: Jennifer Quintenz
- Artist(s): Christian Gossett.
- Letterer(s): Marshall Dillion
- Colorist(s): Emil Petrinic

The Bond of Saint Marcel is a six-issue comic book limited series published by American company Archaia Studios Press. It was created and written by Jennifer Quintenz, with pencils by Christian Gossett.

== Plot ==
For centuries, a mysterious order of priests has jealously guarded the secret of the Bond of Saint Marcel: an occult ritual that enabled priests of the Order to enslave vampires and use them as unwilling soldiers against their own kind. When 16-year-old Katherine Johnstone inherits an ancient family signet ring she is swept into a world of fatal secrets and a centuries-old quest for vengeance. But with the ring, Kat has also inherited the power to command a vampire, and he may be her only hope of survival.

== Characters ==
- Eamann Innis: a powerful vampire bonded to the Johnstone family during the American Revolution, Eamann has been a slave of the family for over 200 years. He bears no love for the Johnstones.
- Katherine (Kat) Johnstone: the youngest descendant of Avrey Johnstone, the American Revolution Colonel who originally bonded Eamann into service. The black-sheep of her family, Kat is struggling to find her place in the world.
- Adrian: a mysterious vampire who's targeted the Johnstone family with the aim of eliminating every last one of them.
- Lilah: Adrian's devilish lover.
- Simon: Adrian's brutal right-hand man.
- Father Collin & Father Jerome: two members of the current day Order of Saint Marcel.
