= Jessica Hagy =

Cartoonist

- Citizenship: United States
- Occupations: cartoonist, advertising

Jessica Hagy is known for the online cartoon Indexed which is a collection of charts and diagrams hand drawn on 3x5 index cards and organized into a blog format. She has compiled her cartoons into a book called Indexed. The cartoon has also appeared in Freakonomics, Plenty, Good Magazine, and BBC.co.uk. Indexed was voted by readers on Time.com as the best blog of 2008.

== Bibliography ==
=== Comic Compilations ===
- Indexed, 2008, ISBN 978-0-14-200520-0
- How to Be Interesting: (In 10 Simple Steps), 2013, ISBN 978-0-7611-7470-7
- The Art of War Visualized: The Sun Tzu Classic in Charts and Graphs, 2015, ISBN 978-0-7611-8238-2
- The Humanist's Devotional: 366 Daily Meditations from Some of the World's Greatest Thinkers, 2019, ISBN 978-0-9884938-6-5
- How to Be Fearless: In 7 Simple Steps, 2021, ISBN 978-1-63217-368-3
