= Maurice Maréchal (comics artist) =

Belgian comic artist (1922–2008)

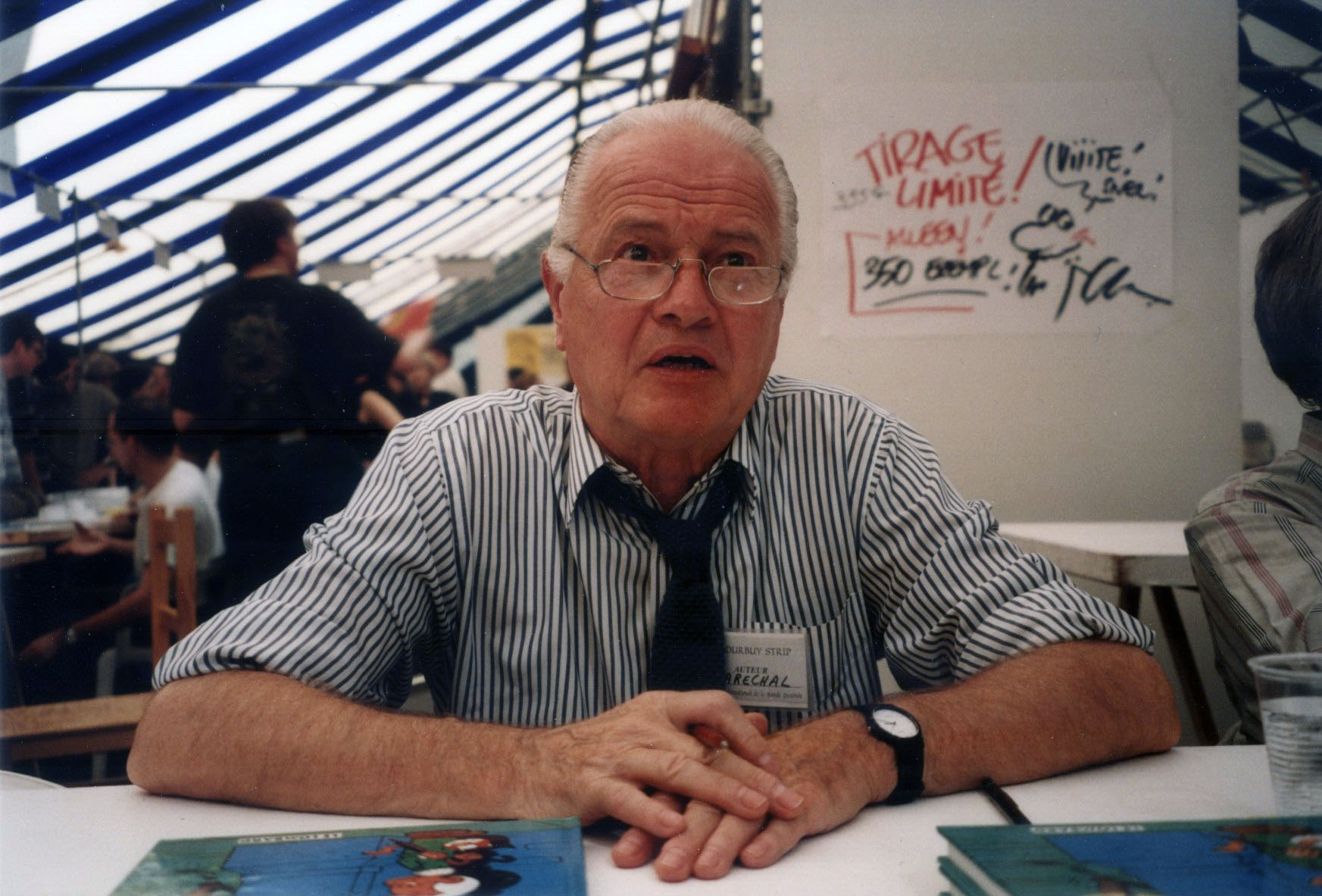
- Born: 6 June 1922 Waremme, Belgium
- Died: 21 March 2008 (aged 85) Polleur, Belgium
- Areas: comics artist, teacher
- Notable works: Prudence Petitpas

Maurice Maréchal (6 June 1922 in Waremme, Belgium – 21 March 2008 in Polleur, Belgium) was a Belgian comics artist, best known for the series Prudence Petitpas.

Maréchal became a professional comics artist in 1957, when he started publishing in the Belgian comics magazine Tintin. Here he created his popular series Prudence Petitpas, about an old lady who solves crimes. Maréchal was well aware that by having a senior person as his central character he would stand out among the many youthful characters in most other comics series. The series originally started off as short stories, until finally adapting longer stories as well. The scripts were written by René Goscinny, Greg, Raymond Macherot and Mittéï.

Maréchal terminated the series in 1967 to concentrate more on his job as a French–Spanish teacher at the Royal Atheneum in Verviers (today the Royal Thil Lorrain Atheneum). Only in 1983 did he find the time to create new stories, this time published in Spirou, where they ran until 1987. In 2001, Prudence Petitpas was adapted into an animated television series.

Maréchal died on 21 March 2008 in Polleur.
