= Urzica =

- Commune
- Coat of arms

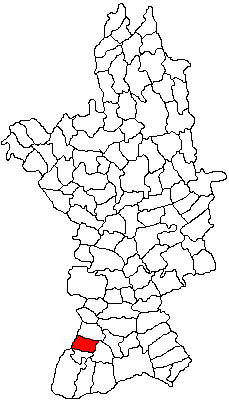
- Location in Olt County

- Location in Romania
- Coordinates: 43°52′N 24°17′E
- Country: Romania
- County: Olt

Government
  - Mayor (2020–2024): Ion Spiridon (PNL)
- Area: 29.64 km^{2} (11.44 sq mi)
- Elevation: 86 m (282 ft)
- Population (2021-12-01): 2,022
  - Density: 68.22/km^{2} (176.7/sq mi)
- Time zone: UTC+02:00 (EET)
  - Summer (DST): UTC+03:00 (EEST)
- Postal code: 237500
- Vehicle reg.: OT
- Website: www.primariaurzica.judetulolt.ro

Urzica is a commune in Olt County, Oltenia, Romania. It is composed of two villages, Stăvaru and Urzica.
