= Rivendell Bicycle Works =

American bicycle company

- Location: United States
- Website: www.rivbike.com

Rivendell Bicycle Works is a producer of lugged steel bicycle frames, located in Walnut Creek, California, United States. Rivendell frames, both custom and stock bicycles, are designed in the U.S. by Grant Petersen. Bicycles are manufactured in the United States, Japan, and Taiwan. Custom frames are made in the U.S.

Grant Petersen, who, while in charge of American marketing and bicycle design at Bridgestone, developed the XO-series, founded Rivendell in 1994.

== Background ==
Rivendell Bicycle Works was founded by Grant Petersen in 1994 in Walnut Creek California. Rivendell operated out of his garage for the first two years. Rivendell Bicycle Works now operates out of a 6,000-square-foot (560 m^{2}) office/warehouse in the same town: 2040 North Main Street #19, Walnut Creek, California 94596. They offer lugged steel bicycle frames and complete bicycles, as well as bicycle parts (some of their own design) and MUSA (Made in America) clothing.

Petersen worked from 1984 to 1994 as Marketing Director for the U.S. division of Bridgestone Cycle, Japan's largest bicycle maker. Bridgestone closed the U.S. office after ten years when the dollar-to-yen exchange rate fell. The name came from the innovative mountaineering equipment company, Rivendell Mountain Works (RMW), best remembered for the frameless Jenson pack. The name is from the fictional refuge in The Lord of the Rings.
