= Hannah Berry =

British comics artist and writer

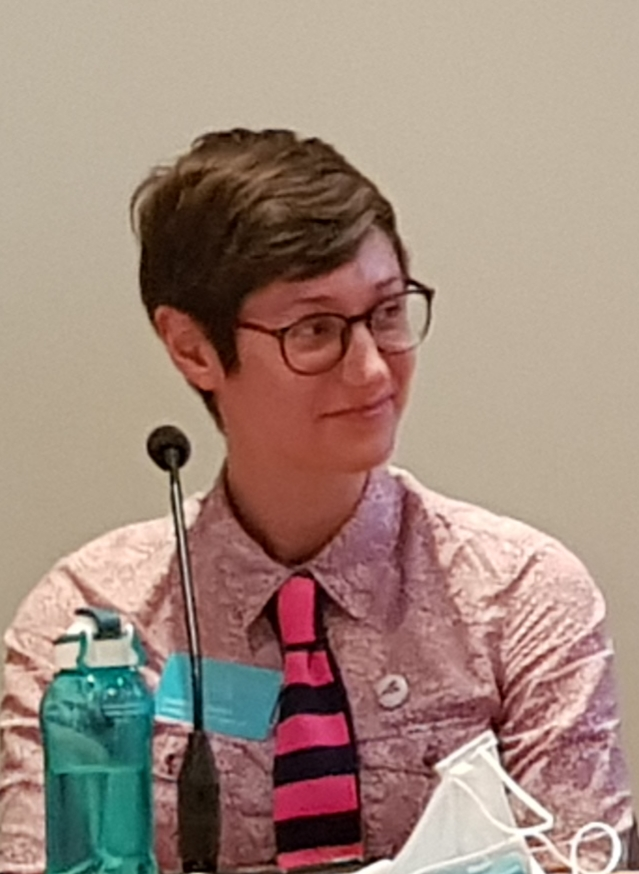
- Berry at the 2021 Thought Bubble comic convention
- Born: 1982 (age 43–44)
- Education: University of Brighton
- Occupations: comics artist and writer
- Years active: 2008 – Present

Hannah Berry is a British comics artist and writer based in Brighton. She is the third UK comics laureate and the first woman to be offered the role, taking over from Charlie Adlard in 2019. In 2018 she was inducted as a fellow of the Royal Society of Literature.

The French edition of Berry's book the noir-esque detective story Britten and Brülightly was chosen for the official selection of the Angoulême International Comics Festival (Festival International de la Bande Dessinée d'Angoulême) in 2010.

== Career ==
In April 2021 Berry was announced as a trustee for the Cartoon Museum after finishing her tenure as comic laureate.

Additionally, Berry joined the newly established Society of Authors Comic Creators Network.

She started an initiative with the Howard League for Penal Reform and fellow comic creator Hannah Eaton; the projects aim was to encourage literacy in young/youth offenders through comics.

== Personal life ==
Berry is half Ecuadorian on her mother's side. When she was younger, her family moved to the United States, where she lived in Maryland and Hampshire near Basingstoke.

Berry learned how to speak English through reading comic books when she was younger.

Berry studied illustration at University of Brighton.

She currently lives in Brighton with her partner, daughter and two pets.

== Bibliography ==
- Livestock (2017, Jonathan Cape)
- Adamtine (2012, Jonathan Cape)
- Britten and Brülightly (2008, Jonathan Cape)
