= Grant Petersen =

American businessman

- Born: 1954 (age 70–71)
- Occupation: bicycle designer
- Years active: 1984-present
- Notable work: Bridgestone XO series

Grant Petersen is a bicycle designer, author, and the founder and owner of Rivendell Bicycle Works. He was U.S. marketing director for Bridgestone Cycle (U.S.A.), Inc. during the 1980s and 1990s, where he designed the XO series of bicycles. He is known for promoting traditional bicycle technology and materials such as wide tires, fenders, leather saddles, and lugged steel frames with relaxed geometry over modern, lightweight, racing technology.

== Early life ==
Born in 1954, Petersen grew up near Berkeley, California. He raced bicycles in his 20's, and at the apex of his career edged out fellow racer and Olympian Norman Alvis at the Mt. Diablo hill climb in 1982. He worked for a time at the Berkeley REI.

== Bridgestone ==
In 1984, Petersen began working for the U.S. bicycle division of Bridgestone Tires in San Leandro, California in data entry and customer support. He later became a marketing director and product manager and in the early 1990s promoted the development of fat-tired road bikes inspired by emerging mountain bike designs. From his time at Bridgestone, Petersen is known for developing the popular XO series of bicycles. Bridgestone ended its U.S. operations in the fall of 1994.

== Rivendell Bicycle Works ==
In 1994 after leaving Bridgestone, Petersen turned down job offers from bike companies, Specialized and Trek, to found Rivendell Bicycle Works out of his garage. There, he continued to hone his ideals of traditional, high-quality, all-around bicycle designs.

== Author ==
Petersen has been a contributor to major bicycling and outdoors magazines and has written four books. The first, Roads to Ride - A Bicyclist's Topographic Guide to Alameda, Contra Costa and Marin Counties, written in collaboration with Mary Anderson, his future wife, was published in 1984 (the dedication reads "Dedicated to B.F. Skinner - who must be the most misunderstood person of all time - and Bob Dylan. It's the least I can do and the only thing I can think of.") The second, Roads to Ride South - a Bicyclist's Topographic guide to San Mateo, Santa Clara and Santa Cruz Counties, with John Kluge, was published in 1985. The third was titled Just Ride and was published in 2012. The fourth was titled Eat Bacon, Don't Jog and was published in 2014.

== Personal life ==
Petersen is a regular bike commuter to his shop located in Walnut Creek, California. He married Mary Anderson in 1985 and has two daughters, Kate and Anna.
