= Prudence Petitpas =

Belgian comic series

- Prudence Petitpas and her cat Stanislas.
- Author: Maurice Maréchal.
- Current status/schedule: Terminated.
- Launch date: 1957
- End date: 1987
- Genre(s): Humor comics, Mystery comics, Crime comics, Adventure comics

Prudence Petitpas was a Belgian comics series, created by Maurice Maréchal.

== Concept ==
Prudence Petitpas is a humoristic series about an old lady, Prudence Petitpas, who lives in the fictional village Moucheron. Much like Miss Marple, she investigates crimes that the police can not solve.

== Characters ==
- Prudence Petitpas: A charming old lady.
- Stanislas: Her cat.
- Cyprien: A police officer who often comes to Prudence's aid.
- Inspector Robur Duroc: A police inspector.
- Jojo: A young boy who is a good friend and useful aid to Prudence.

== History ==
In 1957 Prudence Petitpas was published in Tintin, under recommendation of his neighbour Raymond Macherot. The series centered around an old lady who solved crimes. Maréchal purposefully choose for a senior character to stand out among other comics series who usually had younger protagonists. Originally the series was published in shorter stories, later developed into longer adventures. The series was terminated in 1967 so that Maréchal could concentrate better on his daytime job as a Spanish teacher in Verviers. In 1983 he took time to create new stories, published in Spirou instead, where they ran until 1987.

The scripts were written by René Goscinny, Greg, Raymond Macherot and Mittéï. The series was translated into Dutch, Italian, German, Spanish, Albanian and Arabic.

== TV animated series ==
In 2001 Prudence Petitpas was adapted into an animated TV series as Les enquêtes de Prudence Petipas (The Investigations of Prudence Petipas). It was produced by SEK Studio and Carrere Group D.A. and broadcast on TF1. 52 half-hour episodes were made and ran for two seasons in 2001 and 2004.
