= Chris Moreno =

American comic book illustrator

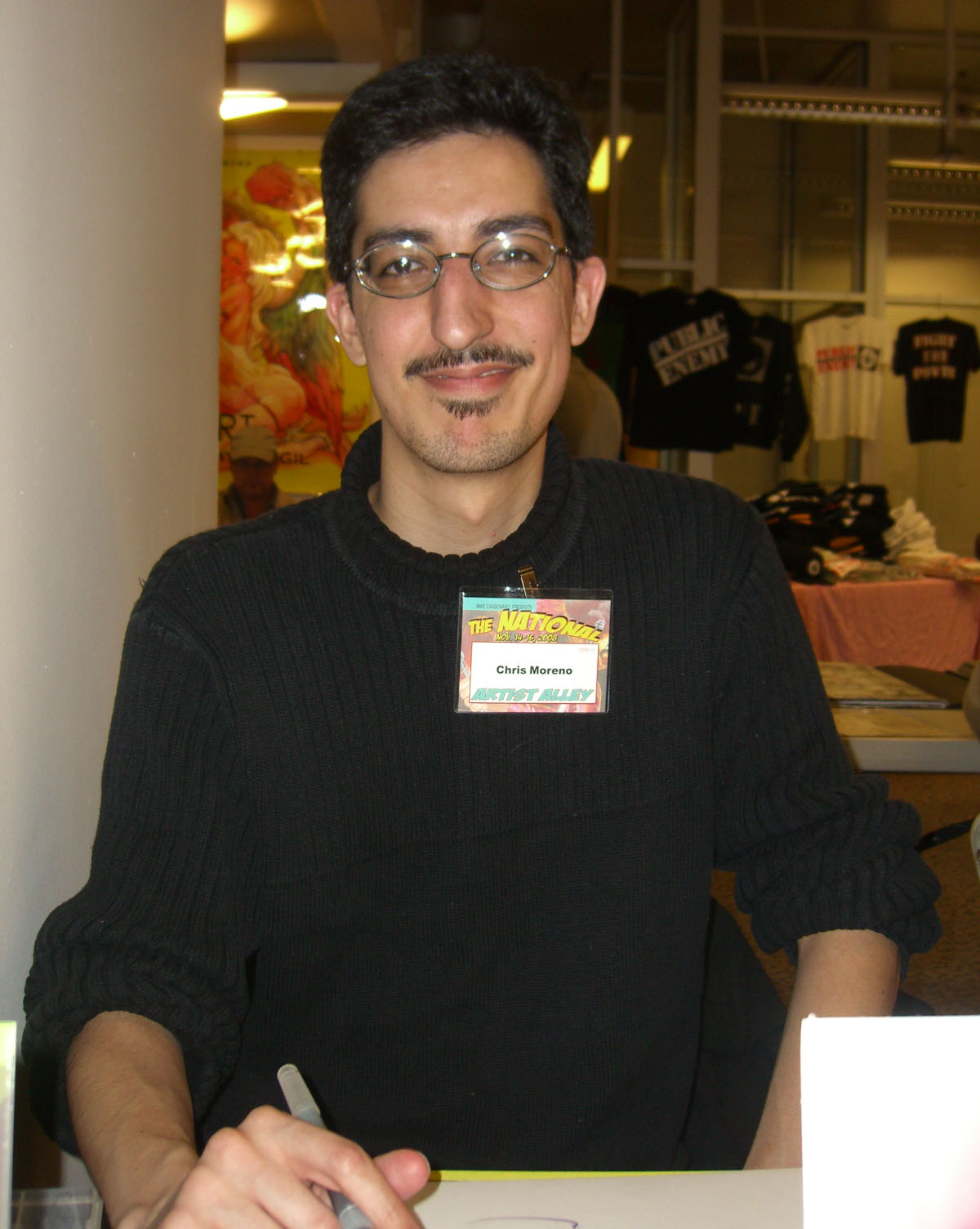
- Moreno at the November 2009 Big Apple Convention.
- Areas: Comic book writer, illustrator, creator.

Chris Moreno is an American comic book illustrator.

== Comic books ==
=== Marvel Comics ===
- World War Hulk: Front Line Issue #2
- World War Hulk: Front Line Issue #4
- World War Hulk: Front Line Issue #5
- World War Hulk: Front Line

=== Image Comics ===
Popgun Vol. 1, 2007 ISBN 1-58240-824-6 (illustrator)
Paul Jenkins Sidekick, (illustrator)
The Wicked West Abomination & Other Tales:"The Horri-Belle Truth" ISBN 1-58240-661-8, 2004

=== BOOM! Studios ===
Toy Story: The Mysterious Stranger, 2009
Zombie Tales #1: A Game Called Zombie, 2007
Fear the Dead: A Zombie Survivors Journal #1, written by Michael Alan Nelson 2006

=== Zenescope Entertainment ===
Grimm Fairy Tales April Fools' Edition, 2009
Grimm Fairy Tales Volume 2, 2007, ISBN 978-0-9786874-6-5

=== Silent Devil Comics ===
Dracula vs. King Arthur #1-#4 2005
Dracula vs. Capone, 2006
The Minions of Ka, Book One 2008, ISBN 1-897548-24-9
Monkey in a Wagon Vs. Lemur on a Big Wheel, (Co-creator)
The Last Sin of Mark Grimm, written by M. Sean McManus 2007

=== Other comic art ===
Knights of the Dinner Table, Kenzer and Company
Superfrat, (web comic)
Unusual Suspects, published by Top Cow 2007
Teddy Scares Vol. 2, published by Ape Entertainment 2007

=== Creator-owned projects ===
The Rot Pack (illustrator)
Tyrannosaurus West (illustrator)
Goth Ninja (illustrator)

== Other work ==
Gymkommentary with Matt Singer.
