= Bancroft family =

Former owners of Dow Jones & Company

The Bancroft family are the former owners of Dow Jones & Company, which is now owned by Rupert Murdoch's News Corporation (NewsCorp).

== Biography ==
The Bancroft family were publicly reclusive Boston socialites who inherited The Wall Street Journal from Clarence W. Barron, who had built up a notable reputation for the newspaper as its publisher. Upon Barron's death in 1928, control of the company passed to Barron's stepdaughter, Jane Bancroft. Jane's husband, lawyer Hugh Bancroft (1879–1933), ran the company and the paper for the next five years.

Suffering from depression, Bancroft committed suicide in 1933 at the age of 54. The family members maintained ownership of the company through ensuing generations, though management was placed in the hands of professionals, including Kenneth C. Hogate, Bernard Kilgore, William F. Kerby, and Warren H. Phillips.

A notable family member of the following generation was Mary Bancroft (1903–1997), Hugh Bancroft's only daughter by his first marriage to Mary Agnes Cogan (1879–1903). She worked for the United States Intelligence Community in Switzerland during World War II. She wrote novels and a memoir, Autobiography of a Spy, before dying in 1997 at the age of ninety-three. She was survived by six grandchildren and twelve great-grandchildren.

Jane Bancroft's daughter Jessie Bancroft Cox was another prominent member of the second generation. Her husband, son, grandson, and great-grandson, —William C. Cox, Bill Cox Jr., Billy Cox III, and Nicholas B. Farrell respectively—were "the only Bancrofts to have actually worked at Dow Jones since Hugh Bancroft's suicide."

The family members' private pastimes consist mainly of show-horse breeding, sailing, and farming. However, the family has also produced a speedboat champion and an airline pilot.

== Dow Jones-NewsCorp sale ==
At the time of the 2007 sale of the Dow Jones & Company to Rupert Murdoch's NewsCorp, the Bancroft family, which included over 30 members, owned 42 percent of the business but controlled 68 percent of the voting stock of Dow Jones through their possession of 7.5 million Class B shares. In the sale to Murdoch, the Bancrofts made more than $1.2 billion.

Bancroft family representatives filled three seats on the Dow Jones board of directors, representing three branches of the family—the descendants of the three children of Hugh and Jane Bancroft. At the time of the sale, those board members included Christopher Bancroft and his cousins Leslie Hill and Elizabeth Steele.

The Bancroft family initially held out for three months against Murdoch's advances until accepting a $60-per-share offer from NewsCorp.
