= Hugh Bancroft (attorney) =

American lawyer and publisher

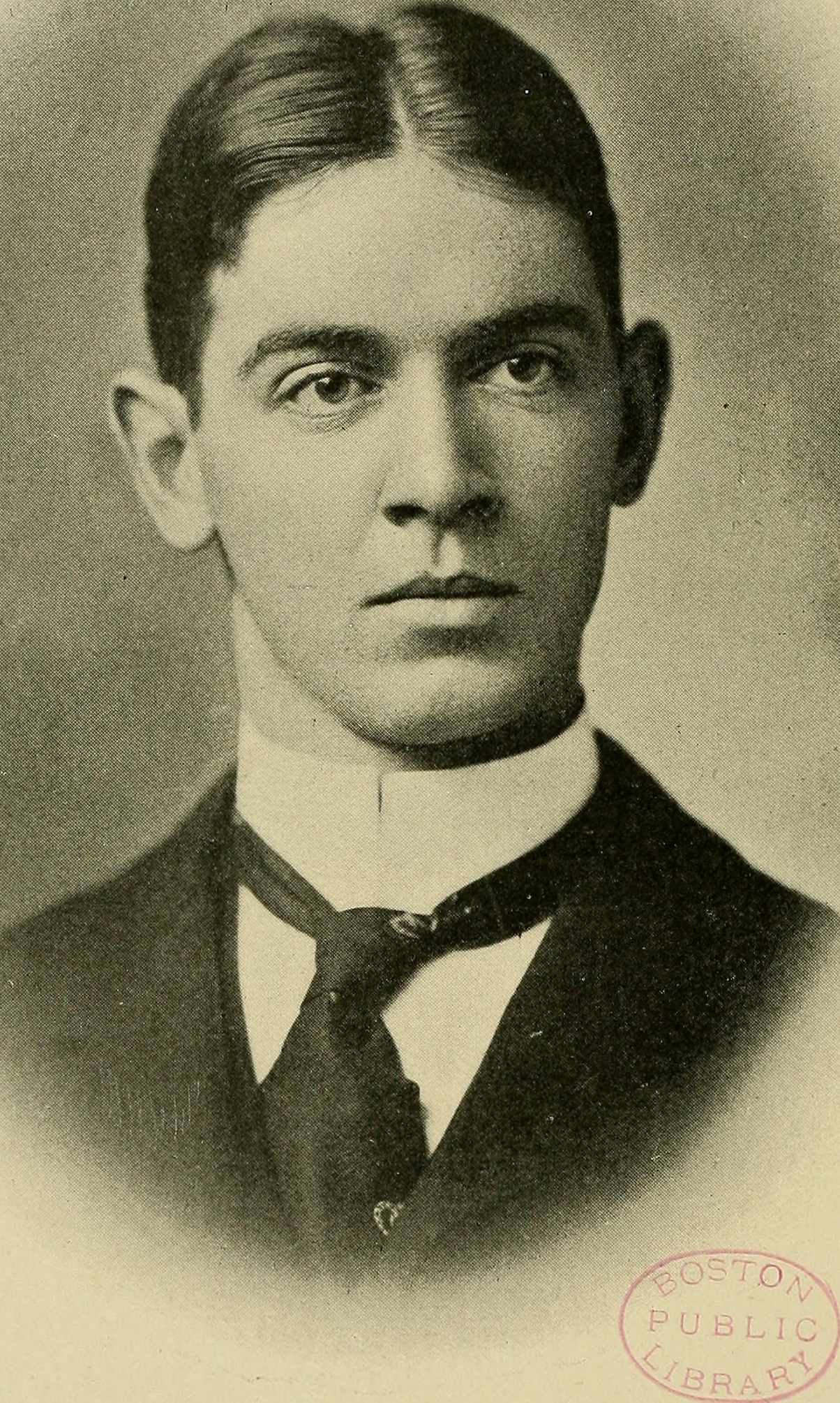
- Bancroft around 1905
- Born: September 13, 1879; Cambridge, Massachusetts, U.S.
- Died: October 17, 1933 (aged 54); Cohasset, Massachusetts, U.S.
- Education: Harvard College; Harvard University; Harvard Law School
- Occupations: Attorney; Publisher
- Political party: Republican
- Spouse(s): Mary Agnes Cogan (1902–1903; her death); Jane Wallis Waldron Barron (1907–1933; his death)
- Children: 4, including Mary Bancroft
- Parent(s): William Bancroft; Mary Shaw
- Relatives: Clarence W. Barron (father-in-law); Sherwin Badger (son-in-law)

Hugh Bancroft (September 13, 1879 – October 17, 1933) was an American publisher and attorney who was the president of the Dow Jones & Company from 1928 to 1933.

== Early life ==
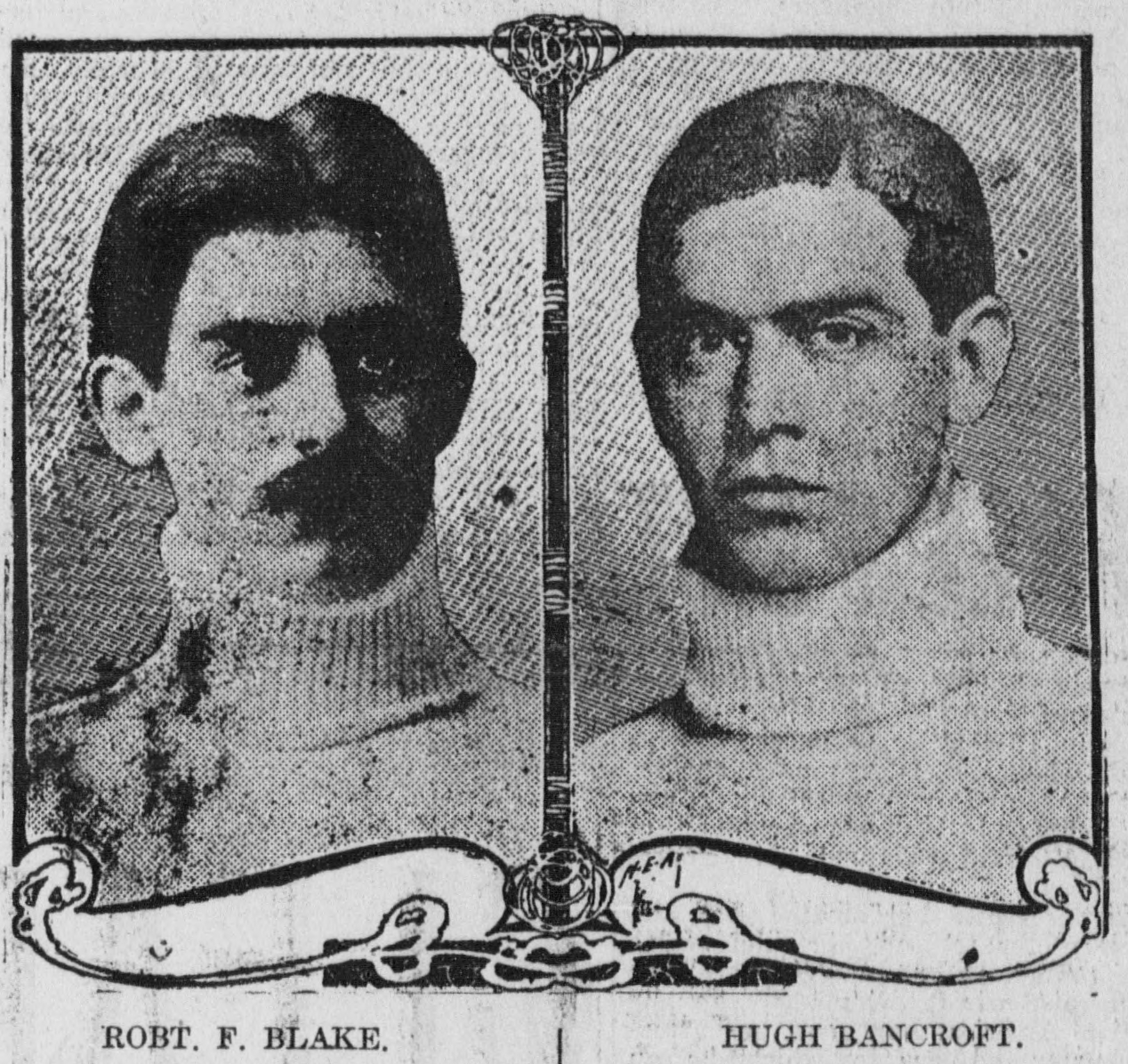
Hugh Bancroft and fellow Harvard rower Robert F. Blake

Bancroft was born in Cambridge, Massachusetts on September 13, 1879, to Mary (Shaw) and William Bancroft. He graduated from Harvard College at the age of 17 and earned a masters of arts degree in civil engineering from the Lawrence Scientific School the following year. He graduated from Harvard Law School in 1901. Bancroft was a member of Harvard's varsity crew for three years and coached the freshman crew in 1902.

== Military service ==
In 1894, despite being underage, Bancroft joined the Massachusetts Volunteer Militia. In 1897 he was moved to the officer ranks and made a captain and engineer on the staff of his father, who commanded the 2nd Brigade. During the Spanish–American War he served as a lieutenant and adjutant in the 5th Massachusetts Infantry. On April 17, 1903, he was appointed lieutenant colonel and assistant adjutant general of the 2nd Brigade. In 1906, Governor Curtis Guild Jr. appointed Bancroft to his military staff as judge advocate general. He was forced to retire from the militia a year later due to typhoid fever. He was brevetted major general by Guild.

== Legal career ==
Bancroft was admitted to the bar in 1901 and formed a firm with Frederick W. Dallinger and Arthur P. Stone. They were later joined by Harry Stearns and Frederick W. Fosdick. Bancroft left the firm in 1905 and it dissolved three years later. After the firm closed, Bancroft went into partnership with Fosdick, while Dallinger and Stearns started their own firm and Stone went into solo practice. Bancroft handled cases for the Boston Elevated Railway and the Cambridge Gaslight Company.

In 1902, Bancroft became an assistant district attorney of Middlesex County, Massachusetts. He was part of the team that prosecuted Charles L. Tucker for the murder of Mabel Page. He resigned from the DA's office in 1906 to focus on his private practice and his duties as judge advocate general. In 1907, district attorney George A. Sanderson was made an associate justice of the Massachusetts Superior Court and Guild appointed Bancroft to succeed him. As DA, in October 1907, Bancroft declined to pursue manslaughter charges against the architect and contractor involved in the Amsden Building collapse of June 1906 in Framingham. Bancroft did not seek a full term in office.

In 1909, Bancroft was the court-appointed counsel for Mary Kelleher, who was charged with murdering her three children and sister-in-law. Bancroft found that the hair of all of the deceaseds' mattresses had been washed in arsenic and convinced John J. Higgins to drop the case.

== Boston Dock Board ==
In 1911, Governor Eugene Foss appointed Bancroft chairman of the board of directors of the Port of Boston, which would oversee the $9 million development of the port. Bancroft received a $15,000-a-year salary as chairman, which made him the second-highest paid state or federal government official in the United States behind only the Governor of New York. Under Bancroft's leadership, the state-of-the art Commonwealth Piers 5 and 6 were built and construction began on a new drydock facility that was to be the largest in the world. He left the board when his term ended on July 1, 1914.

== Personal life ==
On June 25, 1902, Bancroft married Mary Agnes Cogan, daughter of former Cambridge, Massachusetts alderman Joseph Cogan. Mary Bancroft died of an air embolism on October 29, 1903, shortly after giving birth to her daughter, Mary Bancroft.

On January 15, 1907, Bancroft married Jane Wallis Waldron Barron, stepdaughter of Clarence W. Barron. They had three children; Jessie Bancroft Cox, Hugh Bancroft Jr., and Jane Bancroft Cook.

== Publishing ==
After marrying Barron, Bancroft became involved in her stepfather's businesses, which included The Wall Street Journal, Doremus & Co., the Boston News Bureau, and the Philadelphia Financial Journal. In 1912, Barron succeeded Charles Otis as president of Dow Jones & Company and Bancroft became the company's secretary. In 1921, Bancroft was a driving force in the creation of Barron's. Bancroft was a contributor to his and other financial publications and was the author of Inheritance Taxes for Investors and Inheritance Taxes. Upon Barron's death in 1928, control of his businesses passed to Bancroft, who created the Financial Press Companies of America to organize all of Barron's businesses under a single holding company. He retired as publisher in 1931 but remained president of the Financial Press Companies of America and all of its subsidiaries.

== Death ==
On October 17, 1933, Bancroft died at his summer home in Cohasset, Massachusetts. Although he had been ill for the past eight months, his death was unexpected. On October 19, 1933, associate medical examiner George V. Higgins revealed that Bancroft had died from suicide caused by "asphyxiation by coal gas with a question of cyanide fumes". Bancroft had gone to a blacksmith shop on his estate, closed and stuffed the doors and windows, started a fire in the forge, and died from the resulting fumes. Bancroft had reportedly been despondent about his poor health.

Following Bancroft's death, Kenneth Hogate succeeded him as president of the Financial Press Companies of America and all of its subsidiaries except for the Boston News Bureau, which elected its managing editor Herbert M. Cole as president. Control of Dow Jones & Company remained in the Bancroft family until 2007, when it was sold to Rupert Murdoch's NewsCorp.

Business positions
| Preceded by Clarence W. Barron | President of Dow Jones & Company; 1928–1933 | Succeeded by Kenneth C. Hogate |
Political offices
| Preceded by George A. Sanderson | District Attorney of Middlesex County, Massachusetts; 1907–1908 | Succeeded by John J. Higgins |
