= Bleiberg (surname) =

Bleiberg is a surname. Notable people with the surname include:

- Edward Bleiberg (born 1951), American archaeologist and Egyptologist
- Germán Bleiberg (1915–1990, Spanish poet, playwright and translator
- Gertrude Bleiberg (1921–2001), American visual artist
- Miron Bleiberg (born 1955), Israeli-Australian football manager
- Robert Bleiberg (1924–1997), American editor, publisher and writer
