= Richard Grozier =

American newspaper publisher

Richard Grozier

Richard Grozier (1887–1946) was the owner, publisher and editor of The Boston Post from 1924 until his death. He inherited the paper from his father, Edwin Grozier. While he was acting publisher in 1920, The Boston Post received one of the first Pulitzer prizes for exposing Charles Ponzi as a fraud.

== Early life ==
Grozier was born in Brooklyn to Edwin and Alice Grozier. The family moved to Boston in 1891, soon after his father bought the Post. The younger Grozier graduated from Phillips Exeter Academy in 1905, and from Harvard College in 1909. However, he was an indifferent student; he barely maintained a C at Exeter and was "separated" (flunked out) from Harvard three times. He immediately began working for his father's paper, eventually rising to assistant publisher and assistant editor. However, he was given few opportunities to prove himself until his father suffered a total physical breakdown in the spring of 1920. With his managing editor on summer vacation, Richard became operating head of the Post as acting publisher and editor.

== Exposing Ponzi ==
Soon afterward, Charles Ponzi set up his Securities Exchange Company a few blocks from the Post's headquarters. Grozier was very skeptical of Ponzi's claim to double his investors' money in 45 days. At that time, there were about seven respectable newspapers in Boston, but none of them had written about Ponzi's postal reply coupon scheme in detail. Six weeks earlier, The Boston Traveller had written about the Ponzi operation without naming him. Another story three weeks earlier in the Post had described a million-dollar lawsuit against Ponzi by a furniture dealer, but this actually burnished Ponzi's reputation as a wealthy person. Grozier felt this was an opportunity for him to investigate Ponzi and make his mark in the field of respectable media.

Grozier assigned several investigative reporters to check Ponzi out. He got in touch with Clarence Barron, the noted financial journalist, who expressed doubts that Ponzi's operation could possibly be legitimate. The Post published its first story on Ponzi on its front page on July 24, 1920, describing the Ponzis' luxurious locomobile limousine and its Irish immigrant chauffeur John Collins. The story was more or less positive and resulted in further investors rushing to Ponzi's office to invest money. However, Barron was still skeptical, and started to co-author articles for the Post as a consultant. The first of these appeared on July 26, as the Post subsequently began running several articles that questioned whether Ponzi was on the level. The articles caused a panic run on Ponzi's company.

Later that month, former Post reporter William McMasters, now serving as Ponzi's publicity man, came to Grozier with what he claimed was hard proof that Ponzi was generating his "returns" by paying new investors with old investors' money. On August 2, the Post published an article by McMasters declaring Ponzi "hopelessly insolvent," triggering yet another run. A week later, with federal and state investigators closing in on Ponzi, the Post ran an article detailing his conviction for forgery in Montreal 13 years earlier, as well as his role in a scandal-plagued Montreal bank. Ponzi surrendered a day later.

The Post was rewarded for its role in exposing Ponzi's fraud with the 1921 Pulitzer Prize for Public Service—the first time a Boston paper had ever won a Pulitzer, and the only time that a Boston paper would win the Public Service prize until 2003. Grozier initially claimed he was acting on instructions from his father, but Edwin wrote a signed editorial for the June 2 edition which stated that his son had been in complete control of the paper for the entire time.

== Later life ==
Edwin would never recover from the breakdown he suffered in 1920. As a result, Richard remained in day-to-day control of the Post for the next four years, and inherited the paper upon his father's death in 1924. Within five years, he had doubled the Post's circulation to 600,000 copies per day. In 1929, he married his secretary, Margaret "Peggy" Murphy. However, Peggy died in 1933 in childbirth. While he remarried Helen Doherty in 1934, Richard never really recovered emotionally. His depression eventually became so deep that his family committed him to McLean Hospital. He died there on June 19, 1946, of a heart attack, survived by his wife and four children.
