= Zulauf =

Zulauf is a surname. Notable people with the surname include:

- Felix Zulauf (born 1950), Swiss businessman
- Finn Zulauf (born 2004), German racing driver
- Fritz Zulauf (1893–1941), Swiss sport shooter
- Juliusz Zulauf (1891–1943), Polish army general
