= Hugh Bancroft =

Hugh Bancroft may refer to:

- Hugh Bancroft (attorney) (1879–1933), American publisher and attorney
- H. Hugh Bancroft (1904–1988), British organist and composer
