= Edwin Grozier =

Newspaper editor and publisher (1859-1924)

Edwin Atkins Grozier
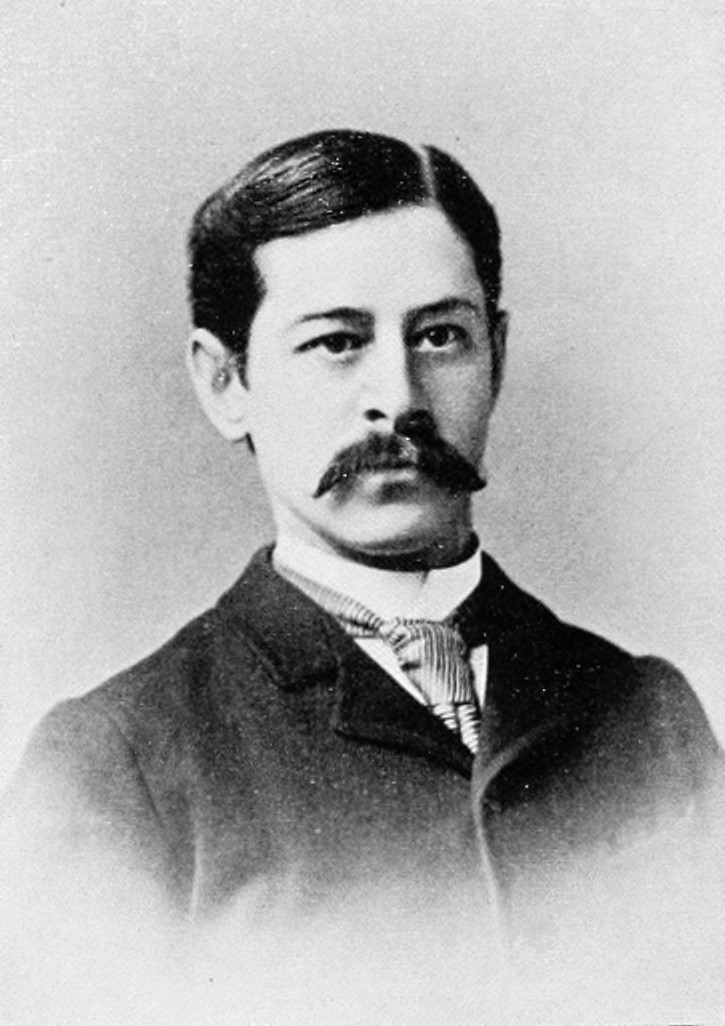
- Grozier c. 1896
- Born: September 12, 1859; San Francisco, California, US
- Died: May 9, 1924 (aged 64); Cambridge, Massachusetts, US
- Occupations: Newspaper editor and publisher

Edwin Atkins Grozier (September 12, 1859 – May 9, 1924) was an American journalist, publisher and author, who owned The Boston Post from 1891 until his death. He authored the book, "The Wreck of the 'Somerset,'" first published in the New York World, May 1886.

He graduated from Boston University in 1881, and worked at both the Boston Herald and The Boston Globe. He served as Governor George D. Robinson's private secretary, and later as private secretary to Joseph Pulitzer. He later became the first city editor of the New York Evening World, and later its editor-in-chief. He took over The Boston Post in October 1891.

== Background and Education ==
Grozier was born at sea, as his father's ship approached the Golden Gate Bridge, near San Francisco. His father, Joshua Freeman, was a sea captain and native of Provincetown, Massachusetts; his mother, Mary Louise (Given), was a native of Bowdoinham.

He attended high school in Provincetown, and attended Chauncy Hall school of Boston. He studied at Brown University, (1877-1879) in Providence, Rhode Island, and graduated from Boston University in 1881, with a bachelor's degree in philosophy.

Grozier married Alice Goodell, native of Salem, Massachusetts, on November 26, 1885. They had two children, Richard (1837–1946) and Helen (b. 1889).

He was a member of numerous clubs and organizations, including the Algonquin Club of Boston, the Fellowcraft of New York, and the Belfry of Lexington.

== Career ==
Grozier began his career in journalism, as a reporter at the Boston Herald and The Boston Globe from 1881–1883. He then spent a year, serving as Governor George D. Robinson's private secretary (1883–1884). Grozier returned to the newsbusiness in 1885, as private secretary to Joseph Pulitzer, and later as city editor of the New York World, (1887) and managing editor of The Evening World and the Sunday World (1889–1891).

In October 1891, Grozier purchased controlling interest in The Boston Post, at a time when readership was low, with a circulation of less than 2500; the paper was on the verge of bankruptcy. However, in less than 25-years, Grozier grew the paper into the largest circulation morning newspaper in the country.

=== Advertising and public relations ===
In 1909, Grozier launched a public relations campaign aimed at increasing readership. He purchased 700 walking canes, and sent them out to 700 New England towns where the Post was published. The top of the African ebony, gold-tipped canes, were stamped with the words, "Presented by the Boston Post to the oldest resident of ... (name of town)." The Board of Selectmen in each town were to be trustees; ensuring the canes were presented in a ceremony to the town's oldest living man. The custom was expanded to include a community's oldest women in 1930. More than 500 towns in New England still carry on The Boston Post Cane tradition with the original canes they were awarded in 1909.

Under his leadership, the Post became the leading U.S. newspaper in advertising volume, and advertisers recognized the Post as an opportunity for increased exposure. One Philadelphia advertising agency noted that the Post was the only paper published in the morning. Zain Advertising, launched a 10-week ad-writing contest with the Post, in an effort to engage and educate the public on the importance of advertising. Three hundred prizes were awarded each week for the best advertising suggestions on 24 products. Two grand prizes, $500 and $1000, were awarded at the end of the campaign; over 500-thousand entries were submitted over the 10-week period.

=== Notable reporting ===
==== Richeson murder and execution ====
The New England Historical Society wrote of the coverage of the 1911 murder of Avis Linnell by Clarence Richeson, saying, '"the crusading newspaper editor of The Boston Post, Edwin Grozier, brought him to grief...[putting] his reporters on the story. They found Richeson bought cyanide from a druggist in Newtown, Mass...the Post demanded a police investigation into the death of Avis Linnell."' Richeson ultimately confessed, and was executed.

==== Charles Ponzi scheme ====
Grozier suffered a severe physical breakdown in 1920, leaving day-to-day control of the Post to his son, Richard Grozier. Under the younger Grozier, the Post won the Pulitzer Prize for Meritorious Public Service after exposing Charles Ponzi as a fraud. The newspaper expose covered individuals with political and financial ties to the scheme. Many community members, including authorities, did not believe the allegations, made during the papers investigation, until "the bubble burst," leaving millions of dollars in public money lost, as a large Trust company failed.

The Post was rewarded for its role in exposing Ponzi's fraud with the first Pulitzer Prize for a Boston paper. It would be the only time that a Boston paper would win the Public Service prize until 2003. Richard initially claimed he guided the investigation under instructions from his father, but Edwin wrote a signed editorial for the June 2 edition which stated that his son had been in complete control of the paper for the entire time.

== Death ==
Grozier died at his home on Brattle Street in Cambridge, Massachusetts, on May 9, 1924, after having written two editorials that day.

After his death, his son Richard succeeded him as editor and publisher of the Post. The city council in Cambridge, Massachusetts, renamed Hawthorne Avenue, to Grozier Road, in honor of his fathers accomplishments.

== Works ==
- The wreck of the "Somerset," Press of the Provincetown advocate, 1886.
- One Hundred Best Novels Condensed, co-authored with Charles E. L. Wingate and Charles Henry Lincoln, Harper & Bros., 1920.
