= Justice Sanderson =

Justice Sanderson may refer to:

- George A. Sanderson (judge) (1863–1932), associate justice of the Massachusetts Supreme Judicial Court
- Silas Sanderson (1824–1886), chief justice of the California Supreme Court
