= William Kerby =

William Kerby may refer to:

- William F. Kerby (1908–1989), chairman and CEO of Dow Jones & Co. and publisher of The Wall Street Journal
- William J. Kerby (1870–1936), writer, sociologist and Catholic social worker
