= Richeson =

Surname

Richeson is a surname. Notable people with the surname include:

- Clarence Richeson (1876–1912), executed for the sensationalized murder of Avis Willard Linnell
- Jennifer Richeson (born 1972), African-American social psychologist who studies racial identity and interracial interactions
- Josh Richeson (born 1981), stock car driver
