= Mary Bancroft =

American novelist

Mary Bancroft (October 29, 1903 – January 10, 1997) was an American novelist, spy and a member of the Bancroft family, which at one time owned Dow Jones & Company. In 1942, while living in Switzerland, Bancroft was recruited by the Office of Strategic Services, and both worked and had a romantic relationship with Allen Dulles. Her most important work was with Hans Bernd Gisevius, a German military intelligence officer who supplied her with details of the 20 July plot to assassinate Hitler. After the war, Bancroft settled in New York City and became a novelist.

== Life ==
Bancroft was born in Boston to Mary (née Cogan) and Hugh Bancroft. Her mother died from an air embolism shortly after giving birth to Mary. Her father married Jane Wallis Waldron Barron in 1907 and Mary was raised by her step-grandfather Clarence W. Barron. Bancroft studied at Smith College in Massachusetts, but dropped out after a year. She married Sherwin Badger; they had two children, Sherwin, Jr., and Mary Jane, who married Horace Taft, grandson of President William Howard Taft.

From 1926 to 1932, Mary Bancroft resided in New York City, New York and spent some of that time attending socials at the apartment of her friend from Massachusetts, Ruth Forbes Paine, and Paine's husband, George Lyman Paine Jr. After divorcing her first husband Sherwin Badger she went on a boat trip to Europe in summer 1933 together with her still married - but now separated - friend, Ruth Forbes Paine known more simply as Ruth Paine, where she met a Swiss accountant, Jean Rufenacht, who became her second husband. She moved to Zurich, Switzerland in 1934, where she learned excellent French and German, and became a close friend and student of Carl Jung, who cured her of chronic attacks of sneezing.

Following the US entry into World War II, Bancroft was recruited by the Office of Strategic Services, although she was not initially aware of the fact, being asked by a US Embassy contact to write analyses of German policy based on German public sources for Swiss and American newspapers. She was then introduced to Allen Dulles in Zurich in December 1942 and went on to have a romantic relationship with him, based on Dulles' proposition that "We can let the work cover the romance, and the romance cover the work." Dulles assigned Bancroft to work with Hans Bernd Gisevius, a German military intelligence officer who supplied her with details of the planned 20 July plot to assassinate Hitler; Bancroft soon developed a romantic relationship with Gisevius too. After the war, with her relationship with Dulles cooling, Bancroft became close friends with Dulles' wife Clover, who told her she was aware of their relationship and approved. She remained close friends with Clover until the latter's death in 1974.

After the war Bancroft settled in New York and became close friends with Henry Luce. She became "a leading champion of Jung's psychology in the United States", lecturing on the subject and publishing articles in academic journals. She also published several novels in the 1950s, and an autobiography in 1983.

She died in New York City on January 10, 1997.

== Books ==
- Upside Down in the Magnolia Tree. Little, Brown (1952)
- The Inseparables. Little, Brown (1958)
- Autobiography of a Spy. New York: William Morrow (1983). ISBN 978-0688020194.
