= Charles Otis (businessman) =

Charles Otis (1872–1944) was a prominent financial publisher in New York and New England who served as president of The Wall Street Journal and its parent, Dow Jones & Company, and publisher of his family-owned newspapers, American Banker and Bond Buyer.

== Early life ==
Otis was born August 19, 1872, in Yarmouth Port, Massachusetts, the eldest of eight children of George and Adelaide Freeman Otis, and attended local schools. George Otis worked in news and advertising on Cape Cod and in 1878 founded a local newspaper, The Cape Cod Item.

== Career ==
Otis began his journalism career at the Boston News Bureau, which was founded by Clarence W. Barron.

Through his association with Barron, Otis joined the board of Dow Jones & Company and was elected its president in 1905. By 1912, he had purchased Forest and Stream Publishing Company and resigned as president of Dow Jones to focus on active management of his acquisition. Barron succeeded him as president of Dow Jones.

In 1913, Otis became president and publisher of Bond Buyer, a municipal finance newspaper owned by the Otis family, and in 1981 he became president and publisher of American Banker, the daily banking newspaper. In 1936, he marked the 100th anniversary of American Banker's founding with the publication of a centennial edition.

== Death ==
Otis, who resided in New York, died at his summer home in Yarmouth Port on September 30, 1944. He was succeeded as president of American Banker by his son, Charles Barron Otis, who was later named chairman and publisher. C. Barron Otis, named for his father's mentor, Clarence W. Barron, remained in the post for 30 years until his death in 1974.

Charles Otis was survived by five adult sons and daughters and his second wife, whom he married in 1938. His estate owned American Banker and Bond Buyer until 1983, when his great-nephew, Derick Otis Steinmann, facilitated their sale to International Thomson during his tenure as publisher.
