= Amsden Building collapse =

1906 building collapse in Framingham, Massachusetts

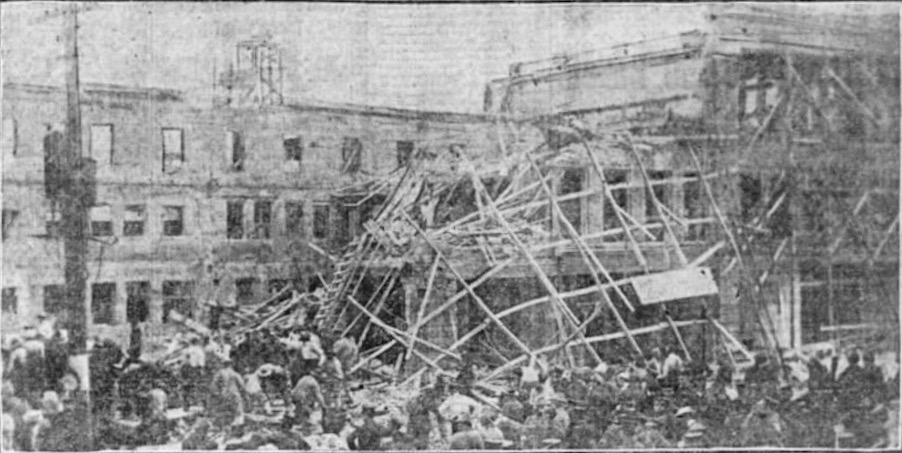
- Photograph of the collapse from The Boston Globe
- Date: July 23, 1906 (120 years ago)
- Time: 3:40 PM
- Location: Amsden Building, Concord Street, Framingham, Massachusetts, U.S.; 42°16′44″N 71°25′00″W
- Cause: Weak concrete in basement piers
- Deaths: 13
- Injuries: 8
- Accused: Andrew Jensen and Charles E. Barnes
- Charges: Manslaughter
- Verdict: Case nol prosed

The Amsden Building collapse occurred on July 23, 1906, in Framingham, Massachusetts. 12 people were killed when the building, which was under construction, suddenly collapsed. A 13th person later died from injuries suffered in the accident. The building's contractor and architect were indicted for manslaughter, but the charges were later dropped by the district attorney.

== Collapse ==
On July 23, 1906, masons, plumbers, and Italian immigrant laborers were working in the George M. Amsden Building, a three-story concrete-and-steel office building which was under construction on Concord Street in South Framingham. Contractor Andrew Jensen was rushing to finish the job, which was supposed to have been completed on July 1. At 3:40 pm, the steel girders on the north side of the building caved in from the side walls and all three floors collapsed into the center of the ground floor. There were about 50 men in the building at the time it fell.

At the time of the collapse, Framingham did not have a building inspector or building department and did not require permits to construct a building. The town had one plumbing inspector, a hardware merchant who was killed in the collapse. Because the Amsden Building was not a factory, was not intended to have more than 10 people employed above the second floor, and was not going to serve as a tenement house or lodging for more than 10 people, it did not require supervision from a state building inspector either.

== Rescue efforts ==
The Framingham Fire Department and the 9th regiment of the Massachusetts Volunteer Militia were summoned to the scene, but could not begin rescue efforts until the building's broken pillars were shored up. By the following day, 11 bodies had been found in the rubble and efforts shifted from rescuing survivors to recovering bodies. The body of a 12th victim was found on July 25. The search ended on July 26 when authorities were satisfied that all of the men in the building at the time of the collapse had been accounted for. Chester Nicholson, a 21-year old carpenter who initially survived the accident, was paralyzed and remained hospitalized until his death two years later.

== Investigation ==
George A. Winsor, a civil engineer and concrete expert with 12 years experience in testing cement and concrete, was chosen by the town to investigate the collapse. He found the probable cause of the collapse to be concrete footing used for the basement piers. According to Winsor, the bottom five or six inches (13 or 15 cm) of the piers were in such bad shape that it could be broken apart by thumb in some places. He also concluded that attempts made to repair cracks in one of the walls showed those responsible for the building knew things were improper.

An inquest was held before Judge Willis A. Kingsbury of the First Southern Middlesex District Court. His report found that the cause of the accident was "the inadequacy of the pier-footings, aggravated by the overloading of the roof and first floor, and by the steel-frame construction, too light in many positions to bear even the dead weight of the building". He blamed the architect for poor supervision of the project and for accepting the steel work even though it was not up to his specifications, the contractor from overloading the building with construction material and for constructing shoddy pier-footings, and the subcontractor responsible for the steel work for erecting an unsafe frame. The report was forwarded to a grand jury on March 8, 1907. The grand jury recommended "the passage of a law requiring architects to pass examinations as to their qualifications" before being allowed to practice.

The grand jury indicted contractor Andrew Jensen and architect Charles E. Barnes for manslaughter; however, on October 2, 1907, district attorney Hugh Bancroft nol prosed the cases.

== Legacy ==
The namesake of the building, George M. Amsden, died in Lisle, New York, in October 1909 at age 72. He had made his fortune working as a tin peddler in Massachusetts and Rhode Island. He reportedly "lost the property" prior to his death.

When the Amsden Building was completed is unclear, although advertisements for a business located in the building were published by mid-1912. The building still stands in Framingham, located at 95–117 Concord Street, at the corner of Kendall Street. In March 2019, a ribbon cutting ceremony was held for 24 new apartments located on the second and third floors of the building. Prior to being renovated for apartments, those floors were vacant, but had previously held a bowling alley, offices, and a restaurant and bar. The ground floor houses several retail businesses.

== See also ==
- List of disasters in Massachusetts by death toll
