= Louis Seibold =

American journalist

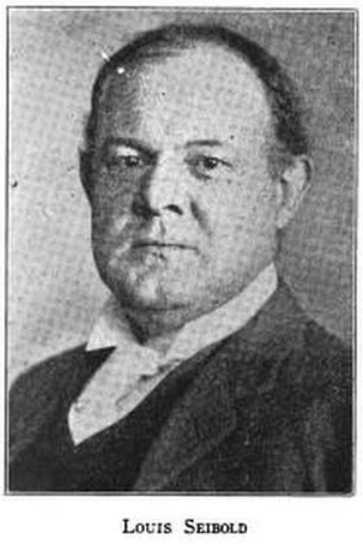

Louis Seibold (October 10, 1863 – May 10, 1945) was a journalist who won the 1921 Pulitzer Prize for an interview with President Woodrow Wilson. Afterwards, it was learned that the interview was fabricated.

== Early life ==
Seibold was born in Washington, D.C. on October 10, 1863, to Louis Philip Seibold and Josephine Burrows (Dawson).

== Career ==
Seibold spent most of his career with the New York World, during that time he covered many important stories, such as the eruption of Mount Pelée, coverage of the Spanish–American War, but most notably, he won the 1921 Pulitzer Prize for his 1920 interview with Woodrow Wilson, which was later proved to be fabricated.

=== Fabricated interview ===
Siebold, working together with Edith Wilson and Joseph Patrick Tumulty, created an interview narrative that presented a false picture to the American people about the state of the president's health.
