= Pasquale Di Milla =

Italian priest (1869–1940)

Father Pasquale Di Milla

Rev. Pasquale Di Milla (September 8, 1869 – March 18, 1940) was one of the first active Italian priests in the Diocese of Boston, Massachusetts.

== Biography ==
Pasquale Di Milla was born on September 8, 1869, in Elena in the province of Caserta, Italy the son of Antonio and Concetta (Valardocchio) Di Milla. He was educated at the Seminary of Gaeta. He was considered a brilliant scholar. Studied in the Latin language and the writings of Virgil.

Di Milla was ordained into the priesthood in June 1892 by Archbishop Nicola Contieri. He was assigned to St. James Church in Elena and taught school there for eight years. At which point he removed to the United States and settled in Boston, Massachusetts, where he arrived on October 1, 1901, on the ship, Tartar Prince. In Boston he was placed in charge of the Italian communicants of St. James Parish on Harrison Avenue.

Father Di Milla was so successful in his position that within three years he was able to build a new church which was dedicated on October 25, 1903, and named the Church of Our Lady of Pompeii.

He was one of a small group of people to found St. Michael's Cemetery in Boston in 1905 and remained president for over a decade starting in 1908.

In 1920, Father Di Milla was one of the directors of the Italian Children's Home in Jamaica Plain. At a Knights of Columbus fund raiser for the home, on July 31, 1920, Charles Ponzi promised Di Milla that he would donate $100,000 for the cause in memory of his mother. Ponzi bought ice cream for all the women and children who were present. Within two weeks, however, Ponzi was arrested for his investment scam.

As a priest he was known as being zealous in his work with the poor looking after their spiritual welfare and their material needs. He remained in charge of the Italian parish work until 1927 when because of his health he was forced to resign as a pastor.

He traveled back to Italy that same year and returned to Boston after a while where Cardinal O'Connell assigned to various chaplaincies which kept him fairly busy. Father Di Milla even served as chaplain at Emmanuel College. His final assignment was as chaplain of Convent of Good Help in East Boston.

Father Di Milla died at St. Elizabeth's Hospital on March 18, 1940, after his prolonged illness. His funeral was held at 10 O'Clock in the morning on March 20, at St. Lazarus Church in East Boston.

== Sources ==
- Rev. Pasquale DiMilla, Priest 47 Years, Dead - Daily Boston Globe (1928–1960); Mar 19, 1940; page 15.
- The National Cyclopædia of American Biography, Volume 16, page 279.
