= Newton Newkirk =

American humorist

- Newkirk, c. 1910
- Born: Clyde C. Newkirk; August 29, 1870; Bentleyville, Pennsylvania, U.S.
- Died: May 15, 1938 (aged 67); Westborough, Massachusetts, U.S.
- Resting place: Fryeburg, Maine, U.S.
- Other name: Newt Newkirk
- Education: Mount Union College
- Occupation: Writer
- Years active: 1901–1934
- Employer: The Boston Post
- Known for: Bingville Bugle comic strip
- Spouse: Irene “Queen” Josephine Craft (m. 1897)

Clyde C. Newkirk (August 29, 1870 – May 15, 1938), who published under the pseudonym Newton "Newt" Newkirk, was an American humorist. He produced a comic strip and various humorous publications.

Newkirk was hired by The Boston Post in 1901; he worked for the newspaper for 33 years and resided in Brookline, Massachusetts. His Bingville Bugle comic strip inspired the nickname for Harry Lillis Crosby Jr.—Bing Crosby—during the latter's childhood.
