= 1921 Pulitzer Prize =

Awards for journalism and related fields

The Pulitzer Prizes for 1921:

== Journalism awards ==
- Public Service:
  - The Boston Post, for its exposure of the operations of Charles Ponzi by a series of articles which finally led to his arrest.
- Reporting:
  - Louis Seibold of New York World, for an interview with Woodrow Wilson.
- Editorial Writing:
  - No award given. Jurors recommended the prize be given to William Peter Hamilton of The Wall Street Journal for two articles on "Our Envied Scrap Heap" and "Soviets and Feudalism", but the Advisory Board declined to make an award.

== Letters and Drama Awards ==
- Novel:
  - The Age of Innocence by Edith Wharton (Appleton)
- Drama:
  - Miss Lulu Bett by Zona Gale (Appleton)
- History:
  - The Victory at Sea by William Sowden Sims in collaboration with Burton J. Hendrick (Doubleday)
- Biography or Autobiography:
  - The Americanization of Edward Bok by Edward Bok (Scriber)
