= Fred N. Wier =

American attorney and politician (1861–1936)

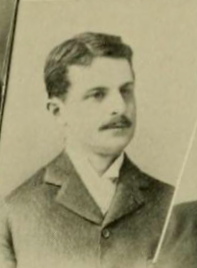

District Attorney of Middlesex County, Massachusetts
- In office 1893–1901
- Preceded by: Patrick H. Cooney
- Succeeded by: George A. Sanderson

Member of the Massachusetts House of Representatives for the 22nd Middlesex District
- In office 1891–1892

Personal details
- Born: July 4, 1861 Lowell, Massachusetts, U.S.
- Died: October 31, 1936 (aged 75) Lowell, Massachusetts, U.S.
- Party: Republican
- Spouse: Bertha Baker (1896–1936; his death)
- Education: Amherst College; Boston University School of Law
- Occupation: Lawyer

Frederick Newton Wier (July 4, 1861 – October 31, 1936) was an American politician and lawyer who served as district attorney of Middlesex County, Massachusetts from 1893 to 1902.

== Early life ==
Weir was born on July 4, 1861, to Newton John and Caroline (Peabody) Wier in Lowell, Massachusetts. He attended Lowell Public Schools and graduated from Lowell High School. In 1882 he graduated from Amherst College. After working in the business world for three years, Weir decided to study law. He studied in the office of J. M. Marshall in Lowell and graduated from the Boston University School of Law in 1887. On December 9, 1896, Wier married Bertha Baker at St. Anne's Church in Lowell.

== Legal career ==
Wier was admitted to the bar in 1887 and worked in the office of A. L. Pillsbury until 1899, when he formed a partnership with Larkin T. Trull in Lowell known as Trull & Wier. In 1891, Wier represented Charles J. Tighe, who was charged with the murder of Peter E. Johnson, a member of the Wampanoag Tribe of Gay Head. Tighe was found guilty of manslaughter and sentenced to 7 years in prison. Trull and Wier were joined by a third partner, John Michael O'Donoghue, in the 1910s. The firm of Trull, Wier, & O'Donoghue was counsel for the Boston and Maine Railroad, Eastern Massachusetts Street Railway, and the Middlesex Safe Deposit & Trust Company.

== Politics ==
From 1891 to 1892, Wier represented the 22nd Middlesex district in the Massachusetts House of Representatives. From 1893 to 1901, Weir was district attorney of Middlesex County. In his final year in office he oversaw the prosecution of Charles R. Eastman. He did not run for reelection in 1901 and was succeeded by his assistant, George A. Sanderson. In 1907, Wier served as Lowell's police commissioner. He was granted a salary by the city council, but refused to take it.

== Later life ==
From 1931 to 1932, Wier was president of the Massachusetts Bar Association. He continued to practice law until his death on October 31, 1936.
