= Kenneth C. Hogate =

American newspaper executive (1897–1947)

- Born: Kenneth Craven Hogate; July 27, 1897; Danville, Indiana, U.S.
- Died: February 11, 1947 (aged 49); Palm Springs, California, U.S.
- Other name: Casey
- Education: DePauw University
- Occupation: Former Dow Jones & Company chairman and president
- Years active: 1918–1947
- Spouse: Anna Shields (m. 1918)
- Children: 3

Kenneth Craven Hogate (July 27, 1897 – February 11, 1947) was an American newspaper executive who was president of Dow Jones & Company from 1933 to 1945.

== Early life ==
Hogate was born on July 27, 1897, in Danville, Indiana. His father was the editor and owner of the Hendricks County, Indiana Republican newspaper. He attempted to join the United States Army during World War I, but was rejected and instead joined the Naval Reserve. He attended DePauw University, where he edited the daily student newspaper. He graduated in 1918 and began his career with the Cleveland News. He then worked for The Detroit News until 1921, when he was made head of Dow Jones' new Detroit bureau.

== Dow Jones & Company ==
Hogate was groomed by Clarence W. Barron to eventually succeed him as head of Dow Jones and The Wall Street Journal. In 1922, Hogate moved to New York City and was soon made assistant managing editor of The Wall Street Journal. In January 1923, Journal staff were informed that managing editor Walter Barclay had returned to his former position as head of the paper's bond department so that Hogate could succeed him. In 1926, he was made vice president and general manager of the Dow Jones & Company.

Following Barron's death, his son-in-law Hugh Bancroft, succeeded him as president of Dow Jones & Company. Bancroft created the Financial Press Companies of America to organize all of Barron's businesses under a single holding company. Hogate was Bancroft's second-in-command and, following Bancroft's death in 1933, succeeded him as president of the FPCA and all of its subsidiaries, including Dow Jones and Barron's Publishing Company. Hogate suffered a stroke in 1942, which led to Wall Street Journal managing editor Bernard Kilgore assuming many of his duties. On November 6, 1945, Kilgore was made president of the FPCA and Hogate was elected chairman of the board. The change was not made public and although Hogate was no longer well enough to run the company, he remained its nominal head.

== Other work ==
In 1938, Hogate was appointed to the Committee for the Study of the Organization and Administration of the New York Stock Exchange (also known as the Conway Committee). Along with Adolf A. Berle, he drafted the committee's report to NYSE president Charles R. Gay, which recommended a number of reforms, including the election of a full-time, salaried president and broader representation on the governing committee. A resident of Scarsdale, New York, Hogate was elected to the village's board of trustees in 1938 and mayor in 1941.

== Death ==
Hogate suffered a cerebral hemorrhage on January 29, 1947, while on vacation in Palm Springs, California and died the following month. He was survived by his wife and three daughters.

Business positions
Preceded by Hugh Bancroft	President of Dow Jones & Company; 1933–1945	Succeeded by Bernard Kilgore
Political offices
Preceded by Arthur F. Driscoll	Mayor of Scarsdale, New York; 1941–1942	Succeeded by John K. Starkweather
