= Olga Huckins =

American editor and writer

Olga Van Slyke Owens Huckins
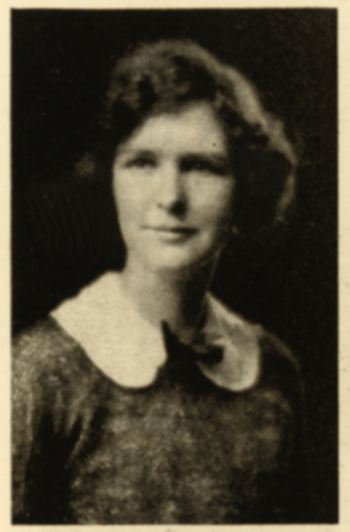
- Born: July 24, 1900
- Died: July 5, 1968 (aged 67); Duxbury, Massachusetts
- Occupations: writer, editor

Olga Van Slyke Owens Huckins (July 24, 1900-July 5, 1968) was a newspaper editor known for being the person who wrote to Rachel Carson alerting her to the harms of the insecticide DDT inspiring the book Silent Spring.

== Early life and education ==
Huckins was born Olga Van Slyke Owens in Kingston, New York to Cleon C. Owens and Minnie Van Slyke. The family lived in Covington, Kentucky for a while and spent summers in Kingston. She graduated magna cum laude from Vassar in 1922. She was married to Stuart Huckins, a timber engineer on September 6, 1923. The couple had one daughter, Mary Olga.

== Career ==
She began writing for the Atlantic Monthly in 1922, and moved the Boston Herald in 1923 where she worked as a columnist and book reviewer. She was a manuscript reader for Little, Brown and Company in 1930. In 1939 she became literary editor of the Boston Transcript until it folded in 1941. She became literary editor of the Boston Post until 1954. Huckins taught modern literature at the Chamberlain School in Boston starting in 1944.

Huckins and her husband Stuart Huckins lived in Duxbury, where they owned a two-acre bird sanctuary. In 1957 the area was sprayed with DDT insecticide by planes in order to control mosquitoes. Huckins was upset because many of her birds had died. She wrote a detailed letter to The Boston Herald and sent a copy with a note to Rachel Carson. Carson later wrote to Huckins saying that her letter entreating her to find someone in Washington who could help had convinced Carson to write her book. In the acknowledgments to her book Carson wrote, "Olga Owens Huckins told me of her own bitter experience of a small world made lifeless...and now brought my attention sharply back to a problem with which I had long been concerned. I then realized I must write this book."

== Death and legacy ==
Huckins died in 1968. Her bird sanctuary was later purchased by Judy and Terry Vose who placed conservation restrictions on it to preserve it from any further development.
