= Warren H. Phillips =

American business executive

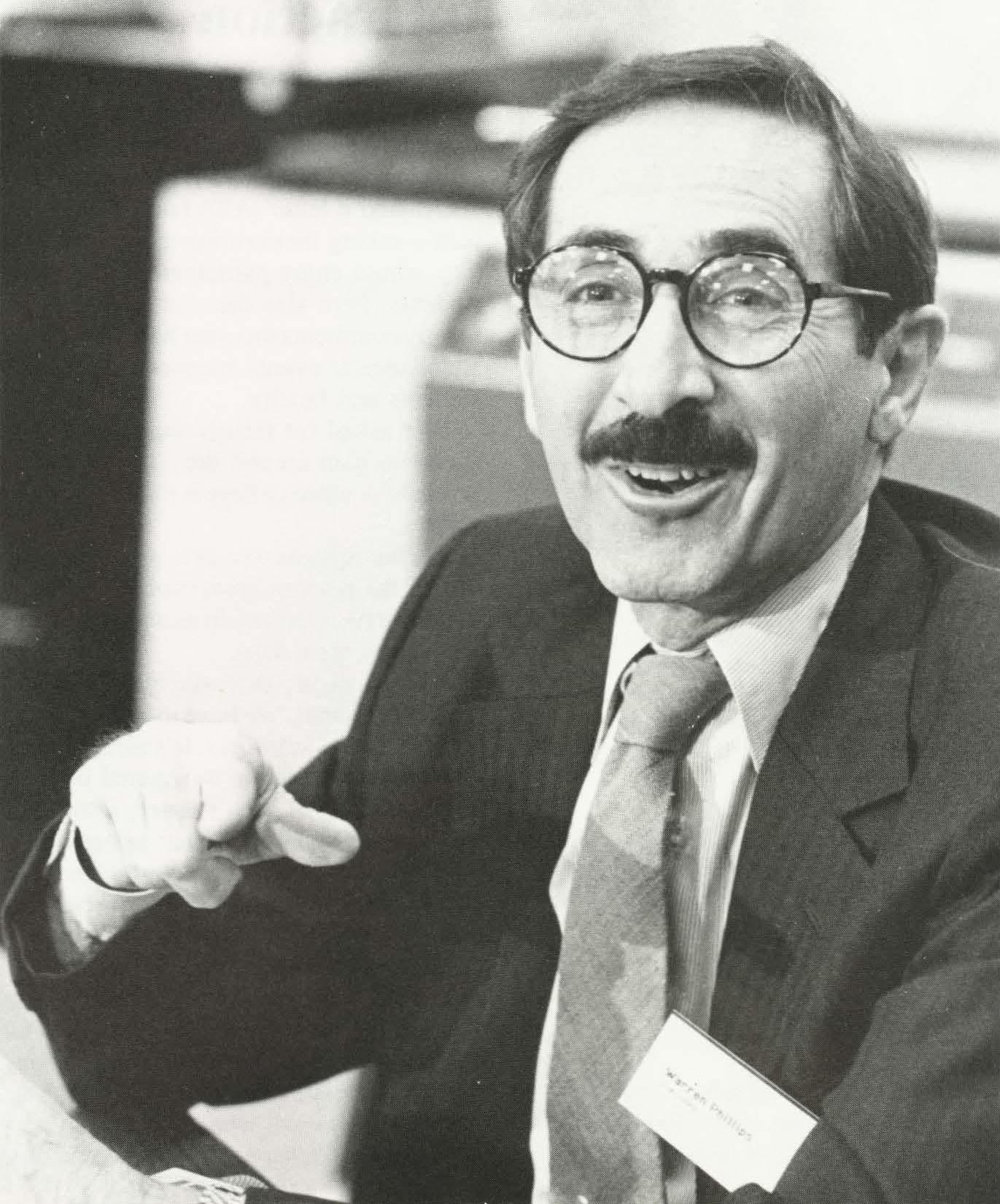
- Phillips in 1988
- Born: June 28, 1926; New York City, New York, U.S.
- Died: May 10, 2019 (aged 92); New York City, New York, U.S.
- Known for: CEO of Dow Jones & Company
- Spouse: Barbara Anne Thomas
- Children: 3 including Lisa Phillips
- Parent(s): Juliette Rosenberg Phillips; Abraham Phillips

Warren H. Phillips (June 28, 1926 – May 10, 2019) was an American journalist and publishing industry executive best known as the chief executive officer of Dow Jones & Company from March 1975 to January 1, 1991, and chairman of the board of Dow Jones from March 1978 until he retired in July 1991 at age 65.

== Early life and education ==
Phillips was born to a Jewish family in New York City, the son of Juliette (née Rosenberg) and Abraham Phillips. He attended schools in the New York area, served in the United States Army from late 1943 to late 1945 and graduated cum laude from Queens College in 1947 with a bachelor's degree. He was awarded an honorary doctor of laws degree by the University of Portland in 1973 and an honorary doctor of humanities degree by Pace University in 1982. In 1987, he received an honorary doctorate of humane letter from Long Island University and an honorary doctorate of humane letters from Queens College. While at Queens College, Phillips was an editor of the campus newspaper, worked weekends as a New York Herald-Tribune copy boy and was a part-time college correspondent for the Tribune and The New York Times. He also contributed feature stories to the Tribune’s Sunday section.

== Career in journalism ==
Following graduation in 1947, Phillips joined The Wall Street Journal as a copy reader in New York and wrote the page-one worldwide news summary until February 1949, when he went to Allied-occupied Germany to work on the copy desk of Stars and Stripes. He continued to contribute to the Journal as a freelance writer. In late 1949, he rejoined the Journal staff as a full-time correspondent in West Germany. He covered the lifting of the Berlin blockade, the end of military government and the establishment in Bonn of the first freely elected German government since the 1930s. In early 1950, Phillips was named chief of the Journal’s London bureau. He reported on Europe’s recovery under the Marshall Plan, its postwar rearmament and Winston Churchill’s return to power in Great Britain as well as other stories in France, Spain, Italy, Greece and Turkey.

At the end of 1951, Phillips was transferred to New York as the Journal’s foreign editor. He was named news editor in 1953 and assigned to edit page-one stories. The following year he moved to Chicago as editor in charge of the Journal’s Midwest edition. In March 1957, he returned to the Journal’s New York publishing headquarters as managing editor. During his eight-and-one-half years in this post, he helped broaden the paper’s coverage to supplement its basic business and governmental news reporting. In 1972, Phillips toured the People’s Republic of China for three and one-half weeks with a delegation of the American Society of Newspaper Editors at the invitation of Chinese journalistic organizations. The 10 articles he wrote during that trip, plus another six written by colleague Robert Keatley, were published in the book, China: Behind the Mask.

Phillips had served as executive vice president of Dow Jones, beginning in March 1972 and as vice president and general manager, beginning in 1970. He also has served as editorial director (1971-88) and executive editor of all Dow Jones publications (1965-70). Phillips was named president of Dow Jones and a director in November 1972. He continued as an active member of the board of directors until April 1997, when he reached the mandatory board retirement age and was named director emeritus. During his time as CEO of Dow Jones, the company expanded into electronic publishing, often called database publishing, and expanded into international operations, with the start-up of Asian and European editions of The Wall Street Journal, Dow Jones’ flagship newspaper. During these same years, the Journal was transformed from a one-section newspaper to three sections, and its coverage of marketing, technology, international affairs and other areas was significantly extended. Its circulation in this period grew from 1.4 million to over two million.

== Community activities ==
In 1958, Phillips was chosen one of the Ten Most Outstanding Young Men of the Nation by the U.S. Junior Chamber of Commerce. He is a former president (1975–76) of the American Society of Newspaper Editors. From 1971 to 1973, he was president of the American Council on Education for Journalism, the body that supervises journalism school accreditation. He served as a member of the Pulitzer Prize Board from 1977 to 1987 and was a director of the American Newspaper Publishers Association from 1976 to 1984. In 1984, he was inducted into the Information Industry Association’s Hall of Fame.

Phillips was a member of the board of directors of the Public Broadcasting Service (PBS) from 1991 to 1997 and a member of the Queens College Foundation Board of Trustees. He was a trustee of Columbia University from 1980 to 1993 and continues as a trustee emeritus. He was a member of the Visiting Committee of Harvard University’s John F. Kennedy School of Government from 1984 to 1990. In 1993, he rejoined the Harvard Visiting Committee after serving in 1992 as an adjunct faculty member at Harvard’s Kennedy School of Government and at the Columbia University Graduate School of Journalism.

== Family life and retirement ==
Phillips married Barbara Anne Thomas of Cape Charles, Virginia, in London in 1951. They had three daughters, Lisa Phillips, Leslie Phillips, and Nina Phillips. In 1992, Phillips and his wife Barbara founded Bridge Works Publishing Co. of Bridgehampton, New York, an independent publisher devoted to quality fiction and non-fiction. He served as co-publisher. He was the author of Newspaperman: Inside the News Business at the Wall Street Journal, published by McGraw-Hill in 2011.

Business positions
Preceded by William F. Kerby	President of Dow Jones & Company; 1972–1991	Succeeded by Peter R. Kann
Preceded by William F. Kerby	CEO of Dow Jones & Company; 1975–1991	Succeeded by Peter R. Kann
