= Bernard Kilgore =

American newspaper editor (1908–1967)

- Born: Bernard Kilgore; November 9, 1908; New Albany, Indiana, U.S.
- Died: November 14, 1967 (aged 59); Princeton, New Jersey, U.S.
- Other name: Barney
- Education: DePauw University
- Occupation: Former Dow Jones & Company chairman and president
- Years active: 1929–1967
- Spouse: Mary Louise Throop (m. 1938)
- Children: 3

Bernard "Barney" Kilgore (November 9, 1908 – November 14, 1967) was the managing editor (1941–1943) of The Wall Street Journal and president (1945–1966) and chairman (1966–1967) of Dow Jones & Company.

== Biography ==
Kilgore was born on November 9, 1908, in New Albany, Indiana. After graduating from DePauw University, he began working for The Wall Street Journal as a copyreader. Three months after joining the newspaper, he moved to San Francisco and became the news editor of its West Coast edition. He returned to New York City in 1933, where he wrote a column on economic trends. In 1936, he became the head of The Wall Street Journal 's Washington, D.C. bureau. In 1941, he was named managing editor of The Wall Street Journal. In 1943, he was made a vice president of the Journal 's parent company, Dow Jones & Company, and succeeded by William F. Kerby. He was promoted to president in 1945 and remained in that role until he was succeeded by Kerby in 1966. He remained chairman of Dow Jones' board of directors until his death from cancer at his home in Princeton, New Jersey, on November 14, 1967.

== Honors ==
In 1961, Kilgore received the Elijah Parish Lovejoy Award as well as an honorary Doctor of Laws degree from Colby College. In 1966, Kilgore received the Golden Plate Award of the American Academy of Achievement.

Kilgore is the subject of the book "Restless Genius" by Richard J. Tofel.

== See also ==
- Princeton Packet

Business positions
Preceded by Kenneth C. Hogate	President of Dow Jones & Company; 1945–1966	Succeeded by William F. Kerby
