= George A. Sanderson (judge) =

- Born: July 1, 1863; Littleton, Massachusetts, U.S.
- Died: June 11, 1932 (aged 68); Boston, Massachusetts, U.S.
- Education: Yale University; Boston University School of Law
- Known for: Associate Justice of the Massachusetts Supreme Judicial Court
- Political party: Republican
- Spouse: Annie S. Bennett (1893–1923; his death)
- Children: 3

George Augustus Sanderson (July 1, 1863 – June 11, 1932) was an American jurist who was an associate justice of the Massachusetts Supreme Judicial Court from 1924 until his death in 1932.

== Early life ==
Sanderson was born on July 1, 1863. His father, George W. Sanderson, was a state legislator and clerk of the 1st District Court of Northern Middlesex. Sanderson grew up on a farm in Littleton, Massachusetts that had been in his family since 1750. He attended Littleton public schools and graduated from the Lawrence Academy in Groton, Massachusetts in 1881, Yale University in 1885, and the Boston University School of Law in 1887. In 1893, he married Annie S. Bennett of Ayer, Massachusetts.

== District attorney's office ==
Sanderson was admitted to the bar shortly after his graduation from law school. From 1893 to 1902 he was an assistant district attorney of Middlesex County, Massachusetts. In 1901, Sanderson won both the Republican and Democratic nominations for district attorney. He was reelected in 1904. As a prosecutor, Sanderson was involved in the trials of Charles R. Eastman, Charles S. Tucker, J. Wilfred Blondin, Lorenzo W. Barnes, and George Hughes and George F. Blake.

== Superior court ==
In 1907, Governor Curtis Guild Jr. appointed Sanderson to the Massachusetts Superior Court. In 1911, he was assigned to preside over the trial of Clarence Richeson, who was charged with murdering his fiancée. Richeson pleaded guilty before the trial began and Sanderson, who had no other alternatives, sentenced him to death. In 1919, Sanderson presided over the fish trust cases, which saw 17 prominent businessmen receive jail sentences and heavy fines for creating a monopoly and conspiring to raise prices in a time of war.

== Massachusetts Supreme Judicial Court ==
In 1924, Sanderson was appointed to the Massachusetts Supreme Judicial Court by Governor Channing H. Cox. He was known for writing dissenting opinions, which was uncommon for the Supreme Judicial Court at that time. He issued a dissenting opinion in a case involving alienation of affections. Sanderson held that once a promise to marry was accepted, a contract existed and a third party who stole the affections of one of the engaged parties interfered with a contract. Sanderson remained on the bench until his death on June 11, 1932. He suffered a sudden heart attack following an operation at New England Deaconess Hospital.

Political offices
Preceded by Fred N. Wier	District attorney of Middlesex County, Massachusetts; 1902–1907	Succeeded by Hugh Bancroft
Preceded by William C. Wait	Associate Justice of the Massachusetts Supreme Judicial Court; 1924–1932	Succeeded by Henry T. Lummus
