= Gertrude Bleiberg =

American visual artist

- Born: Gertrude Tiefenbrun; March 1921; New York City, New York, United States
- Died: August 10, 2001; Palo Alto, California, US
- Known for: Painting

Gertrude Bleiberg (1921-2001) was an American visual artist. Encouraged by Jay DeFeo, who recognized her talent, Bleiberg started working as an artist at the age of 50. She earned a BFA and MFA degrees from the San Francisco Art Institute and developed a unique expressionist style, most notable for monumental depiction of the details of her domestic life: family, home, and friends. In a 25-year retrospective catalog of her work, Fred Martin, former Dean of the San Francisco Art Institute, noted that Bleiberg shows "that the direct experience of seeing may itself be alive, vivid, and recreated to amuse, to baffle, to give-yes-joy."

== Early life ==
Gertrude Bleiberg was born in New York City in 1921. In 1937 her family moved to Los Angeles. After marrying Donald J. Bleiberg, MD in 1942, she moved to Quincy, California, where Gertrude was a teacher and Donald was a family practitioner and operated the Plumas Industrial Hospital. The Bleibergs raised four daughters in Quincy.

In 1965, Bleiberg moved to Palo Alto, California, where Donald practiced emergency medicine with Kaiser Permanente in Santa Clara. The Bleibergs began to travel widely, and Gertrude journaled and sketched during the trips.

In 1969 Bleiberg enrolled in a continuing education art class, taught by Jay DeFeo, who recognized her innate talent and insisted that Bleiberg pursue professional art training. She went on to get a BFA (1975) and MFA (1977) degrees from the San Francisco Art Institute, where she was the oldest student among the young bohemian crowd. Her teachers were Manuel Neri, Elizabeth Murray, and Robert Colescott.

== Career ==
Bleiberg's prints and paintings have been exhibited in numerous museums and corporate collections, including the San Francisco Museum of Modern Art, the Oakland Museum of California, the San Jose Museum of Art, Mills College Art Museum, the Brooklyn Museum, and the Rutgers Archives Collection. In 1996, a 25-year retrospective of her work was held at four galleries in the Bay Area, and in 1992, she was given the Women's Caucus for Art, South Bay Chapter, Lifetime Achievement award.

Bleiberg's drawings, prints, and paintings reference the self-taught artist practices. Eccentric line quality, active surfaces, and distorted figures playfully engage with the "naïve" and "primitive" styles. Yet her unique style is consciously cultivated through many years of outstanding professional training and studio work. Her style most closely compares in the history of post-war American art to that of Alice Neel.
