= Robert Bleiberg =

American writer

- Born: June 21, 1924; New York City, U.S.
- Died: November 3, 1997 (aged 73); New York City, U.S
- Education: Columbia University (BA); New York University (MBA)
- Occupations: Publisher; editor; writer
- Known for: Publisher of Barron's

Robert M. Bleiberg (June 21, 1924 – November 3, 1997) was an American editor, publisher and writer. He was the long-time editor, publisher and editorial director of Barron's.

== Biography ==
Bleiberg was born in Brooklyn in 1924 and graduated from Townsend Harris High School in Manhattan and from Columbia University in 1943. He also received a master's degree in business from New York University Stern School of Business.

He joined Barron's in 1946 as associate editor after serving in the United States Army in World War II and being wounded in Okinawa. In 1954. he became editor of the newspaper and held the position through 1981. In 1980 he was named vice president of the Dow Jones magazine group, and in 1982 editorial director and publisher of Barron's. Bleiberg remained publisher until 1989, and was editorial director from 1982 until he retired in 1991. He was credited for increasing the circulation of the newspaper by fivefold and wrote a weekly column, where he expressed staunchly pro-free-market views and harsh criticisms against government intervention.

Bleiberg received an honorary doctorate from Hillsdale College, where he was also a contributor to the campus publication Imprimis.

In 1985, Bleiberg received the Elliott V. Bell Award by the New York Financial Writers Association. He was also named by the TJFR Group and MasterCard International as one of the 20th century's 100 best business journalists in 1999.

Bleiberg died of leukemia on November 3, 1997, at New York Hospital in Manhattan. He was called "The Great Contrarian" in his obituary by The Wall Street Journal.
