= Charles Ponzi =

Italian businessman and con artist (1882–1949)

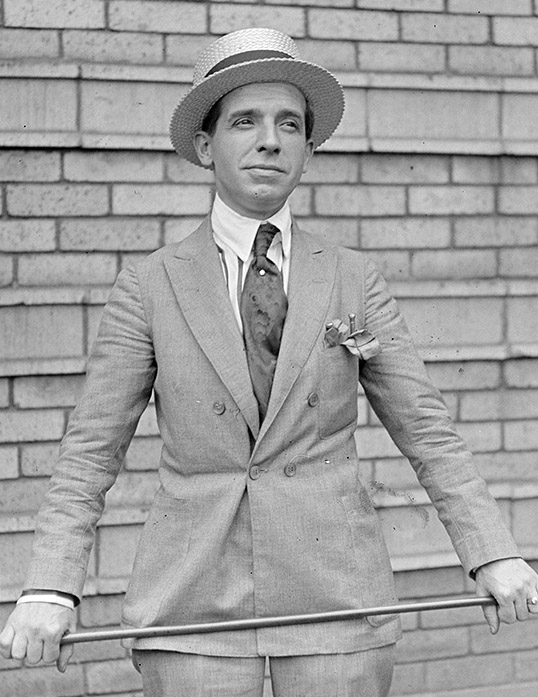
- Ponzi in c. 1920
- Born: Carlo Pietro Giovanni Guglielmo Tebaldo Ponzi; 3 March 1882; Lugo, Emilia-Romagna, Kingdom of Italy
- Died: 18 January 1949 (aged 66); Rio de Janeiro, Federal District, Brazil
- Other names: Carlo; Charles P. Bianchi; Charles Ponci
- Occupations: Financier, confidence trickster
- Known for: Ponzi scheme
- Spouse: Rose Gnecco (m. 1918; div. 1937)
- Motive: Financial gain
- Criminal charges: Forgery (Canada), mail fraud (U.S. federal), larceny (state)
- Penalty: 3 years in Canada 1908–1911; 5 years U.S. federal (served 3 1/2 years before facing state charge) 1920–1922; 9 years state 1927–1934; deportation in 1934

Charles Ponzi (/ˈpɒnzi/; Italian: [ˈpontsi]; born Carlo Pietro Giovanni Guglielmo Tebaldo Ponzi; 3 March 1882 – 18 January 1949) was an Italian charlatan and con artist who operated in the United States and Canada. His aliases included Charles Ponci, Carlo, Benny Broncko and Charles P. Bianchi.

Born in Lugo, Italy, he became known in the early 1920s as a swindler in North America for his money-making scheme. He promised clients a 50% profit within 45 days or 100% profit within 90 days, by buying discounted postal reply coupons in other countries and redeeming them at face value in the U.S. as a form of arbitrage. In reality, Ponzi was paying earlier investors using the investments of later investors. While this type of fraudulent investment scheme was not invented by Ponzi, it became so identified with him that it now is referred to as a "Ponzi scheme". His scheme ran for over a year before it collapsed, costing his "investors" $20 million (equivalent to $243 million in 2025).

Ponzi may have been inspired by the scheme of William W. Miller (also known as "520% Miller"), a Brooklyn bookkeeper who in 1899 used a similar deception to take in $1 million (approximately $32.7 million in 2025).

== Early life ==
Charles Ponzi was born in Lugo, Emilia-Romagna, Kingdom of Italy, on 3 March 1882. He told The New York Times he had come from a family in Parma. Ponzi's ancestors had been well-to-do, and his mother continued to use the title "donna", but the family had subsequently fallen upon difficult times and had little money. Ponzi took a job as a postal worker early on, but soon was accepted into the University of Rome La Sapienza. His richer friends considered the university a "four-year vacation", and he was inclined to follow them around to bars, cafés, and the opera. This resulted in Ponzi spending all his money, and four years later he was broke and without a degree. During this time, a number of Italian men were migrating to the U.S. and returning to Italy as wealthy individuals. Ponzi's family encouraged him to do the same, with the intention of returning his family to its former socio-economic status.

== Arrival in the United States ==
On 15 November 1903, Ponzi arrived in Boston aboard the S.S. Vancouver. By his own account, Ponzi had $2.50 in his pocket (equivalent to $90 in 2025), having gambled away the rest of his life savings during the voyage. "I landed in this country with $2.50 in cash and $1 million in hopes, and those hopes never left me," he later told a reporter for The New York Times. He quickly learned English and spent the next few years doing odd jobs along the East Coast, eventually taking a job as a dishwasher in a restaurant, where he slept on the floor. Ponzi managed to work his way up to the position of waiter, but was fired for theft and shortchanging customers.

== Montreal and prison ==
In 1907, after several years of failing to achieve success in the U.S., Ponzi moved to Montreal, Quebec, Canada, and became an assistant teller in the newly opened Banco Zarossi, a bank located on Saint Jacques Street started by Luigi "Louis" Zarossi to service the influx of Italian immigrants arriving in the city. By this time, Ponzi had a winning personality and spoke English and French, as well as Italian, which helped him get the job at the bank. While working there, Ponzi first saw the scheme of "robbing Peter to pay Paul", which later would be called a Ponzi scheme. Zarossi paid 6 percent interest on bank deposits – double the going rate at the time – and his bank was growing rapidly as a result. Ponzi eventually rose to the position of bank manager. However, he found out that the bank was in serious financial trouble, because of bad real estate loans, and that Zarossi was funding the high interest payments not through profit on investments, but by using money deposited in newly opened accounts. The bank eventually failed, and Zarossi fled to Mexico with a large portion of the money belonging to the bank's customers.

Ponzi stayed in Montreal and, for some time, lived at Zarossi's house, helping the man's abandoned family while planning to return to the U.S. and start over. As Ponzi was penniless, this proved to be very difficult. Eventually, he walked into the offices of a former Zarossi customer, Canadian Warehousing, and finding no one there, wrote himself a check for $423.58 (equivalent to $14,636 in 2025) in a checkbook he found, forging the signature of Damien Fournier, a director of the company. Confronted by police who had taken note of his large expenditures just after the forged check was cashed, Ponzi held out his wrist and said, "I'm guilty". He ended up spending three years as Inmate #6660 at St. Vincent-de-Paul Federal Penitentiary, a bleak facility located on the outskirts of Montreal. Rather than inform his mother of his imprisonment, he posted her a letter stating that he had found a job as a "special assistant" to a prison warden.

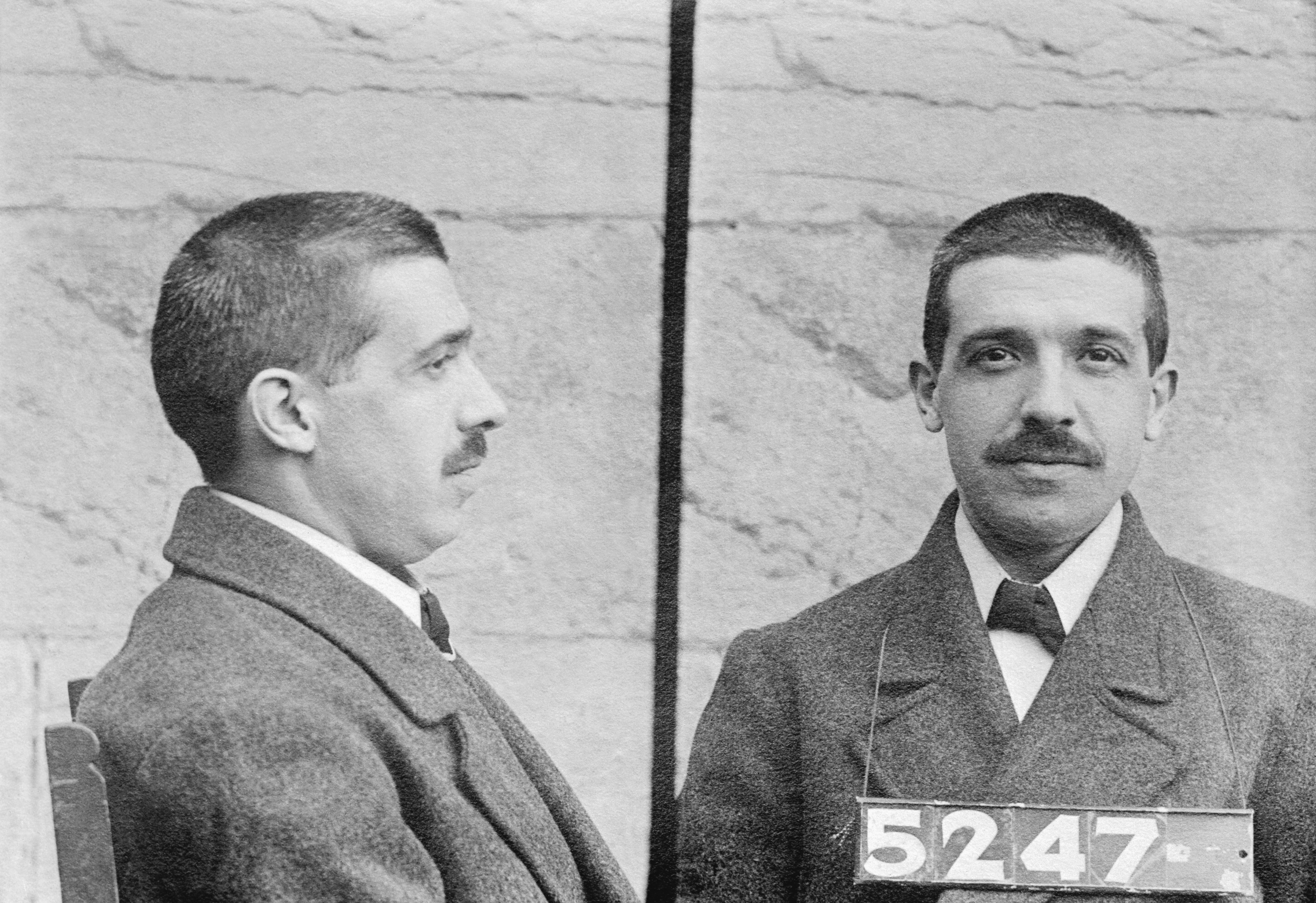
Mug shot, c. 1910

After his release in 1911, Ponzi decided to return to the U.S., but became involved in a scheme to smuggle Italian illegal immigrants across the border. He was caught and spent two years in Atlanta Prison. Here he became a translator for the warden, who was intercepting letters from mobster Ignazio "the Wolf" Lupo. Ponzi ended up befriending Lupo. Another prisoner, Charles W. Morse, became a true role model to Ponzi. Morse, a wealthy Wall Street businessman and speculator, fooled doctors during medical exams by eating soap shavings to give the appearance of ill-health. Morse was soon released from prison. Ponzi completed his prison term following Morse's release, having an additional month added to his term due to his inability to pay a $50 fine (equivalent to about $1,629 in 2025).

== Work in a mining camp and in Boston ==
After Ponzi's release from prison, he made his way back to Boston. While working at a mining camp as a nurse, he came up with the idea of going to another mining camp, starting a utility there that would supply water and power, and selling its stock. During this time, a fellow nurse called Pearl Gosid had suffered severe burns in an accident. Despite not knowing her, Ponzi volunteered for two major operations to donate 122 square inches (790 cm^{2}) of skin from his back and legs to Pearl. This resulted in pleurisy and similar complications, and Ponzi losing his job.

Thereafter Ponzi continued to travel around looking for work, and in Boston, he met Rose Maria Gnecco, a stenographer, to whom he proposed marriage. Gnecco came from a family of Italian-American immigrants who had a small fruit stall in downtown Boston. Though Ponzi did not tell Gnecco about his years in jail, his mother sent Gnecco a letter telling her of Ponzi's past. Nonetheless, she married him in 1918. For the next few months, Ponzi worked at a number of businesses, including his father-in-law's grocery, and the import-export company JR Poole before hitting upon an idea to sell advertising in a large business listing to be sent to various businesses. He was unable to sell this idea to businesses, and his company failed soon after. Ponzi took over his wife's family's fledgling fruit company for a short time, but to no avail, and it, too, failed shortly thereafter.

== Origin of the term "Ponzi scheme" and IRC scheme ==
=== An idea to trade IRCs ===
Ponzi set up a small office at 27 School Street, Boston, in the summer of 1919 attempting to sell business ideas to contacts in Europe. He received a letter from a company in Spain asking about the advertising catalog which included an international reply coupon (IRC), leading Ponzi to find a weakness in the system which, at least in principle, gave him an opportunity to make money.

Postal reply coupons allowed a person in one country to pay for the postage of a reply to a correspondent in another country. IRCs were priced at the cost of postage in the country of purchase, but could be exchanged for stamps to cover the cost of postage in the country where redeemed; if these values were different, there was a potential profit. Inflation after World War I had greatly decreased the cost of postage in Italy expressed in U.S. dollars, so that an IRC could be bought cheaply in Italy and exchanged for U.S. stamps of higher value, which could then be sold. Ponzi claimed that the net profit on these transactions, after expenses and exchange rates, was in excess of 400%. This was a form of arbitrage, or profiting by buying an asset at a lower price in one market and immediately selling it in a market where the price is higher, which is legal.

Seeing an opportunity, Ponzi quit his job as a translator to execute his IRC scheme, but needed a large capital expense to buy IRCs at lower performing European currencies. He first tried to borrow money from several banks, including the Hanover Trust Company, but they were not convinced, and its manager, Henry H. Chmielinski, refused to lend him money.

Subsequently, Ponzi set up a stock company to raise money from the public. He also went to several of his friends in Boston and promised that he would double their investment in 90 days, in an environment when banks were paying only 5% annual interest. The great returns from postal reply coupons, he explained to them, made such incredible profits easy to accomplish. Some people invested and were paid as promised, receiving $750 in interest on initial investments of $1,250.

=== Securities Exchange Company ===
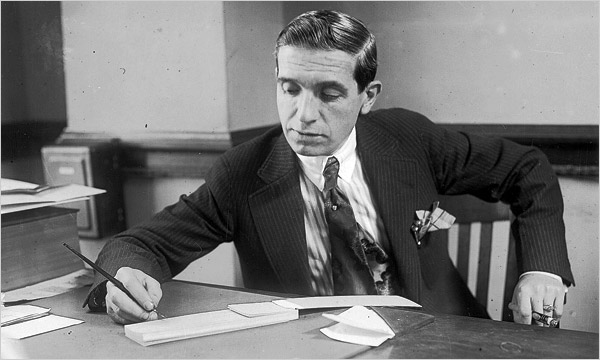
Ponzi in 1920, while still working as a businessman in his office in Boston

In January 1920, Ponzi started his own company, the "Securities Exchange Company", to promote the scheme. In the first month, 18 people invested in his company with a total of $1,800. He paid them promptly, the very next month, with money obtained from a newer set of investors.

Ponzi set up a larger office, this time in the Niles Building on School Street. Word spread, and investments increased rapidly. Ponzi hired agents and paid them generous commissions. Between February and March 1920, the total amount invested had risen from $5,000 to $25,000 ($80,000 to $400,000 in 2025, respectively). As the scheme grew, Ponzi hired agents to seek out new investors in New England and New Jersey. At that time, investors were being paid impressive rates, which subsequently encouraged others to invest. By May 1920, he had made $420,000 (equivalent to $6,800,000 in 2025). By June 1920, people had invested $2.5 million in Ponzi's scheme (equivalent to $40,000,000 in 2025). By July, he was approaching a million dollars per day.

Ponzi began depositing the money in the Hanover Trust Bank of Boston (a small bank on Hanover Street in the mostly Italian North End), in the hope that once his account was large enough he could impose his will on the bank or even be made its president; he bought a controlling interest in the bank through himself and several friends after depositing $3 million. By July 1920, Ponzi had made millions. Some of his investors had been mortgaging their homes and investing their life savings. Most did not take their profits but reinvested. Ponzi's company, meanwhile, had set up branches from Maine to New Jersey.

Even though Ponzi's company was bringing in fantastic sums of money each day, the simplest financial analysis would have shown that the operation was running at a large loss. As long as money kept flowing in, existing investors could be paid with the new money. This was the only method Ponzi had to continue providing returns to existing investors, as he made no effort to generate legitimate profits.

Ponzi's initial investors consisted of working-class immigrants like himself. Gradually, news travelled upwards, and many well-to-do Boston Brahmins also invested in his scheme. In its heyday, nearly 75% of Boston's police force had invested in the scheme. Ponzi's investors even included those closest to him, like his chauffeur John Collins and his own brother-in-law. Ponzi was indiscriminate about whom he allowed to invest, from young newspaper boys investing a few dollars to high-net-worth individuals, like a banker from Lawrence, Kansas, who invested $10,000.

=== Infeasibility of Ponzi's scheme ===
Though Ponzi was still paying back investors, mostly from money from subsequent investors, he had not yet figured out a way to actually change the IRCs to cash. He also subsequently realized that changing the coupons to money was logistically impossible. For example: for the initial 18 investors of January 1920, for their $1,800 investment, it would have taken 53,000 postal coupons to actually realize the arbitrage profits. For the subsequent 15,000 investors that Ponzi had, he would have had to fill Titanic-sized ships with postal coupons just to ship them to the U.S. from Europe. However, Ponzi found that all the interest payments returned to him, as investors continued to re-invest.

=== Ponzi's subsequent lifestyle ===
Ponzi lived luxuriously: he bought a mansion in Lexington, Massachusetts, and maintained accounts in several banks across New England besides Hanover Trust. He bought a Locomobile, one of the finest cars of that time. He had initially purchased two first-class tickets to Italy for a delayed honeymoon with Rose, but instead decided to change them to bring his mother from Italy to the U.S. in a first-class stateroom on an ocean liner. She lived with Ponzi and Rose for some time in Lexington, but died soon after. On July 31, 1920, Ponzi told Father Pasquale Di Milla, the director of the Italian Children's Home in Jamaica Plain, that he would donate $100,000 in honor of his mother. Ponzi also bought a macaroni company and part of a wine company in an attempt to gain profits that could be used to repay the investors of his IRC scheme.

=== Suspicion ===
Ponzi's rapid rise naturally drew suspicion. When a Boston financial writer suggested there was no way Ponzi could legally deliver such high returns in a short period of time, Ponzi sued for libel and won $500,000 in damages. As libel law at the time placed the burden of proof on the writer and publisher, this effectively neutralized any serious probes into his dealings for some time.

Nonetheless, there were still signs of his eventual ruin. Joseph Daniels, a Boston furniture dealer who had given Ponzi furniture which he could not afford to pay for, sued Ponzi to cash in on the gold rush. The lawsuit was unsuccessful, but it did prompt people to begin asking how Ponzi could have gone from being penniless to being a millionaire in a short span of time. There was a run on the Securities Exchange Company, as some investors decided to pull out. Ponzi paid them and the run stopped.

On 24 July 1920, The Boston Post printed a favourable article on Ponzi and his scheme that brought in investors faster than ever. At that time, Ponzi was making $250,000 a day. Ponzi's good fortune was increased by the fact that just below this favorable article, which seemed to imply that Ponzi was indeed returning 50% return on an investment after only 45 days, was a bank advertisement that stated that the bank was paying 5% returns annually. The next business day after this article was published, Ponzi arrived at his office to find thousands of Bostonians waiting to give him their money.

Despite this reprieve, Post acting publisher Richard Grozier (who was running the paper in the absence of his father Edwin, its owner and publisher) and city editor Eddie Dunn were suspicious and assigned investigative reporters to look into Ponzi. He was also under investigation by Massachusetts authorities, and, on the day the Post printed its article, Ponzi met with state officials. He managed to divert the officials from checking his books by offering to stop taking money during the investigation, a fortunate choice, as proper records were not being kept. Ponzi's offer temporarily calmed the suspicions of the state officials.

=== Collapse of the scheme ===
On 26 July 1920, the Post started a series of articles that asked hard questions about the operation of Ponzi's money machine. The paper contacted Clarence W. Barron, the financial journalist who headed Dow Jones & Company, to examine Ponzi's scheme. Barron observed that though Ponzi was offering fantastic returns on investments, Ponzi himself was not investing with his own company.

Barron then noted that to cover the investments made with the Securities Exchange Company, 160 million postal reply coupons would have to be in circulation. However, only about 27,000 actually were. The United States Post Office stated that postal reply coupons were not being bought in quantity at home or abroad. Despite the substantial gross profit margin in percent on buying and selling each IRC, the overhead required to handle the purchase and redemption of these items, which were of extremely low cost and were sold individually, would have exceeded the gross profit (see #Infeasibility of Ponzi's scheme). Barron added that even if Ponzi really was doing what he claimed to do, it would be immoral to invest with him since he would effectively be profiting at the expense of a government – either the governments where he bought the coupons or the U.S. government.

The Post articles caused a panic run on the Securities Exchange Company. Ponzi paid out $2 million in three days to a wild crowd outside his office. He canvassed the crowd, passed out coffee and doughnuts, and cheerfully told them they had nothing to worry about. Many changed their minds and left their money with him. However, this attracted the attention of Daniel Gallagher, the U.S. Attorney for the District of Massachusetts. Gallagher commissioned Edwin Pride to audit the Securities Exchange Company's books – an effort made difficult by Ponzi's bookkeeping system consisting merely of index cards with investors' names.

In the meantime, Ponzi had hired a publicist, William McMasters. However, McMasters quickly became suspicious of Ponzi's endless talk of postal reply coupons, as well as the ongoing investigation against him. He later described Ponzi as a "financial idiot" who did not seem to know how to add. The investigation into Ponzi began in late July, when McMasters found several highly incriminating documents that indicated Ponzi was merely "robbing Peter to pay Paul". McMasters went to Grozier, his former employer, with this information. Grozier offered him $5,000 for his story, which was printed in the Post on 2 August 1920. In his article, McMasters declared Ponzi hopelessly insolvent, reporting that while he claimed $7 million in liquid funds, he was actually at least $2 million in debt. With interest factored in, McMasters wrote, Ponzi was as much as $4.5 million in the red. The story touched off a massive run, and Ponzi paid off in one day. He then sped up plans to build a massive conglomerate that would engage in banking and import/export operations.

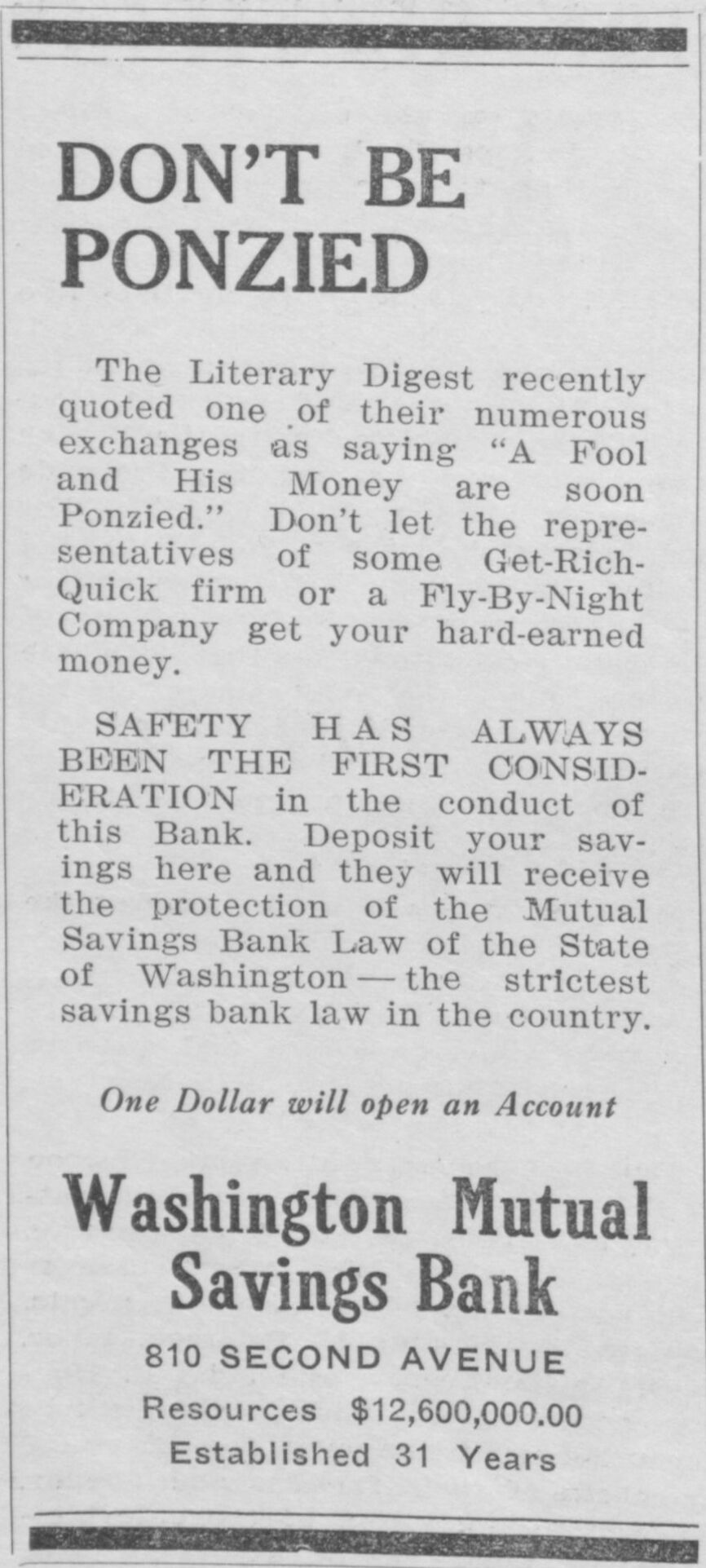
Even before his trial, Ponzi's name had begun to pass into the language as a fraudster. This ad dated 25 September 1920 for Washington Mutual Savings Bank in Seattle, declares, "Don't Be Ponzied".

At this point, further trouble came from an unexpected quarter. Massachusetts Bank Commissioner Joseph Allen became concerned that if major withdrawals exhausted Ponzi's reserves, it would bring Boston's banking system to its knees. Allen's suspicions were further aroused when he found out a large number of Ponzi-controlled accounts had received more than $250,000 in loans from Hanover Trust. This led Allen to speculate that Ponzi was not nearly as well-financed as he claimed, since he was getting large loans from the bank he effectively controlled. He ordered two bank examiners to keep an eye on Ponzi's accounts.

On 9 August, the bank examiners reported that enough investors had cashed their checks on Ponzi's main account there that it was severely overdrawn. Allen then ordered Hanover Trust not to pay out any more checks from Ponzi's main account. He also orchestrated an involuntary bankruptcy filing by several small Ponzi investors. The move forced Massachusetts attorney general J. Weston Allen to release a statement that there was little to support Ponzi's claims of large-scale dealings in postal coupons. State officials then invited Ponzi noteholders to come to the Massachusetts State House to furnish their names and addresses for the purpose of the investigation. On the same day, Ponzi received a preview of Pride's audit, which revealed Ponzi was at least $7 million in debt.

On 11 August, the Post published with a front-page story about his criminal activities in Montreal 13 years earlier, including his forgery conviction and his role at Zarossi's scandal-ridden bank. That afternoon, Bank Commissioner Allen seized Hanover Trust due to numerous irregularities. The commissioner thus inadvertently foiled Ponzi's plan to borrow funds from the bank vaults as a last resort in the event all other efforts to obtain funds failed. The following day, Ponzi's certificate of deposit at Hanover Trust, which had been worth $1.5 million, was reduced to $1 million after bank officials tapped into it to cover the overdraft. Even if he had been able to convert it into cash, he would have had only $4 million in assets.

Amid reports that he was about to be arrested any day, Ponzi surrendered to federal authorities and accepted Pride's figures. He was charged with mail fraud for sending letters to his marks telling them their notes had matured. He was originally released on $25,000 bail and was immediately re-arrested on state charges of larceny, for which he posted an additional $10,000 bond. After the Post released the results of the audit, the bail bondsman feared Ponzi might flee the country and withdrew the bail for the federal charges, sending Ponzi back to prison. Attorney General Allen declared that if Ponzi managed to regain his freedom, the state would seek additional charges and seek a bail high enough to ensure Ponzi would stay in custody.

=== Magnitude of losses ===
The news brought down five other banks in addition to Hanover Trust. Ponzi's investors were practically wiped out, receiving less than 30 cents to the dollar. They lost about $20 million in 1920 dollars (approximately $321 million in 2025 dollars). By comparison, Bernie Madoff's similar scheme that collapsed in 2008 cost his investors about $18 billion, 53 times the losses of Ponzi's scheme.

== Prison and later life ==
In two federal indictments, Ponzi was charged with 86 counts of mail fraud and faced life imprisonment. At the urging of his wife, Ponzi pleaded guilty on 1 November 1920, to a single count before Judge Clarence Hale, who declared before sentencing, "Here was a man with all the duties of seeking large money. He concocted a scheme which, on his counsel's admission, did defraud men and women. It will not do to have the world understand that such a scheme as that can be carried out ... without receiving substantial punishment." Ponzi was sentenced to five years in federal prison.

=== Massachusetts ===
Ponzi was released after three-and-a-half years and was almost immediately indicted on 22 state charges of larceny, which came as a surprise to Ponzi; he thought he had a deal calling for the state to drop any charges against him if he pleaded guilty to the federal charges. He sued, claiming that he would be facing double jeopardy if Massachusetts essentially retried him for the same offenses spelled out in the federal indictment. The case, Ponzi v. Fessenden, made it all the way to the U.S. Supreme Court. On 27 March 1922, the Supreme Court ruled that federal plea bargains have no standing regarding state charges. It also ruled that Ponzi was not facing double jeopardy because Massachusetts was charging him with larceny while the federal government charged him with mail fraud, even though the charges implicated the same criminal operation.

In October 1924, Ponzi was tried on the first 10 larceny counts. Since he was insolvent, Ponzi served as his own attorney and, speaking as persuasively as he had with his duped investors, was acquitted by the jury on all charges. He was tried a second time on five of the remaining charges, and the jury deadlocked. Ponzi was found guilty at a third trial, and was sentenced to an additional seven to nine years in prison as "a common and notorious thief". There were efforts to have him deported as an undesirable alien in 1924.

=== Florida ===
In September 1925, Ponzi was released on bail as he appealed the state conviction. He fled to the Springfield neighborhood of Jacksonville, Florida, and launched the Charpon Land Syndicate ("Charpon" is an amalgamation of his name), seeking to capitalize on the Florida land boom. He offered investors tiny tracts of land, some underwater, and promised 200% returns in 60 days. In reality, it was a scam that sold swampland in Columbia County. Ponzi was indicted by a Duval County grand jury in February 1926 and charged with violating Florida trust and securities laws. A jury found him guilty on the securities charges, and the judge sentenced him to a year in the Florida State Prison. Ponzi appealed his conviction and was freed after posting a $1,500 bond.

Ponzi traveled to Tampa, where he shaved his head, grew a mustache, and tried to flee the country as a crewman on a merchant ship bound for Italy. However, he revealed his identity to a shipmate. Word spread to a deputy sheriff, who followed the ship to its last American port of call in New Orleans and placed Ponzi under arrest. After Ponzi's pleas to Calvin Coolidge and Benito Mussolini for deportation were ignored, he was sent back to Massachusetts to serve out his prison term. Ponzi served seven more years in prison.

In the meantime, government investigators tried to trace Ponzi's convoluted accounts to figure out how much money he had taken and where it had gone. They never managed to untangle it and could only conclude that millions of dollars had gone through his hands.

=== Italy ===
Ponzi was released in 1934. With the release came an immediate order to have him deported to Italy. He asked for a full pardon from Massachusetts governor Joseph B. Ely. However, on 13 July, Ely turned the appeal down. Ponzi's charismatic confidence had faded, and when he left the prison gates, he was met by an angry crowd. He told reporters before he left, "I went looking for trouble, and I found it." On 7 October, Ponzi was officially deported.

Rose stayed in the U.S. and divorced Ponzi in 1937. She had not wanted to leave Boston, and Ponzi was in no position to support her in any event.

In Italy, Ponzi jumped from scheme to scheme, but little came of them. He eventually got a job in Brazil as an agent for Ala Littoria, the Italian state airline. During World War II, however, the airline's operation in the country was shut down after the British intelligence services intervened and Brazil sided with the Allies. During that time, Ponzi also wrote his autobiography.

== Death ==
Ponzi spent the last years of his life in poverty, working occasionally as a translator. He died in the charity ward of Hospital São Francisco in Rio de Janeiro on 18 January 1949, blind in one eye and partly paralyzed. He left an estate of $75, which was barely enough to bury him.

Later in his life, Ponzi said of his scheme, "Even if they never got anything for it, it was cheap at that price. Without malice aforethought, I had given them the best show that was ever staged in their territory since the landing of the Pilgrims! It was easily worth fifteen million bucks to watch me put the thing over." Toward the end of his life, in an interview with an Associated Press reporter, Ponzi said, "My business was simple. It was the old game of robbing Peter to pay Paul."

== In popular culture ==
Jake Epstein portrays Ponzi in "Home for the Holidays", the third stand-alone Christmas special of the Canadian television period detective series Murdoch Mysteries.

In Season 3, Episode 6 of the Downton Abbey series, Robert says, “There is a chap in America, what's his name, Charles Ponzi, who offers a huge return in 90 days.”

In 2016, Ponzi's international postal coupon scheme was a target of investigation by White Rabbit Project host Tory Belleci in the fourth episode, claiming first place for the episode among five other contenders due to its originality and amount gotten away with in modern currency, despite its short duration of eight months.

== See also ==
- White collar crime
- List of fraudsters
- List of Ponzi schemes

== Bibliography ==
- Ponzi, Charles (2001) [1936]. The Rise of Mr. Ponzi. Naples, Fl: Inkwell Publishers. ISBN 978-0-9631924-4-8.
- Dunn, Donald (2004), Ponzi: The Incredible True Story of the King of Financial Cons, Library of Larceny, New York: Broadway, ISBN 0-7679-1499-6
- Zuckoff, Mitchell (2005), Ponzi's Scheme: The True Story of a Financial Legend, New York: Random House, ISBN 1-4000-6039-7
- The History Channel. "In Search of History: Mr. Ponzi and His Scheme". February 9, 2000. (AAE-42325, ISBN 0-7670-1672-6)
- Leila Schneps and Coralie Colmez, Math on Trial: How Numbers Get Used and Abused in the Courtroom, Basic Books, 2013. ISBN 978-0-465-03292-1. (Eighth chapter: "Math error number 8: underestimation. The case of Charles Ponzi: American dream, American scheme").
- Sobel, Robert (1968), The Great Bull Market: Wall Street in the 1920s, New York: Norton, ISBN 0-393-09817-6
- Kalbfleisch, John (2009), "Ponzi scheme: the Montreal link", The Gazette, Montréal
