= Barron's =

American financial weekly newspaper

- April 5, 2021 cover of Barron's
- Editor in Chief: Ben Levisohn
- Categories: Business
- Frequency: Weekly
- Total circulation: 305,513 (2013)
- Founder: Clarence W. Barron
- First issue: 1921; 105 years ago
- Company: Dow Jones & Company (News Corp)
- Country: United States
- Based in: New York City, US
- Website: www.barrons.com
- ISSN: 1077-8039
- OCLC: 29933161

Barron's (stylized in all caps) is an American weekly magazine and newspaper published by Dow Jones & Company, a division of News Corp, since 1921.

Founded as Barron's National Financial Weekly in 1921 by Clarence W. Barron (1855–1928) as a sister publication to The Wall Street Journal, Barron's covers U.S. financial companies, market developments, and relevant statistics. Each issue provides a summary of the previous week's market activity as well as news, reports, and an outlook on the week to come.

== Features ==
Features in the publication include:

- Market Week – coverage of the previous week's market activity
- Barron's Roundtable – Posts from noted investors such as Bill Gross, Mario Gabelli, Abby Joseph Cohen, Felix Zulauf, and Marc Faber
- Best Online Brokers – A ranking of the top online trading brokerage firms. Criteria include trading experience and technology, usability, mobile, range of offerings, research amenities, portfolio analysis & report, customer service & education, and costs.
- Top Financial Advisors – America's top financial advisors

== History ==
The magazine has been published by Dow Jones & Company since 1921. The magazine is named after Clarence W. Barron, an influential figure to Dow Jones and a founder of modern financial journalism. Dow Jones also publishes The Wall Street Journal. In 1990, color was introduced to the magazine and full color in January 1996. Barron's introduced a two-section version of the paper on March 7, 1994.

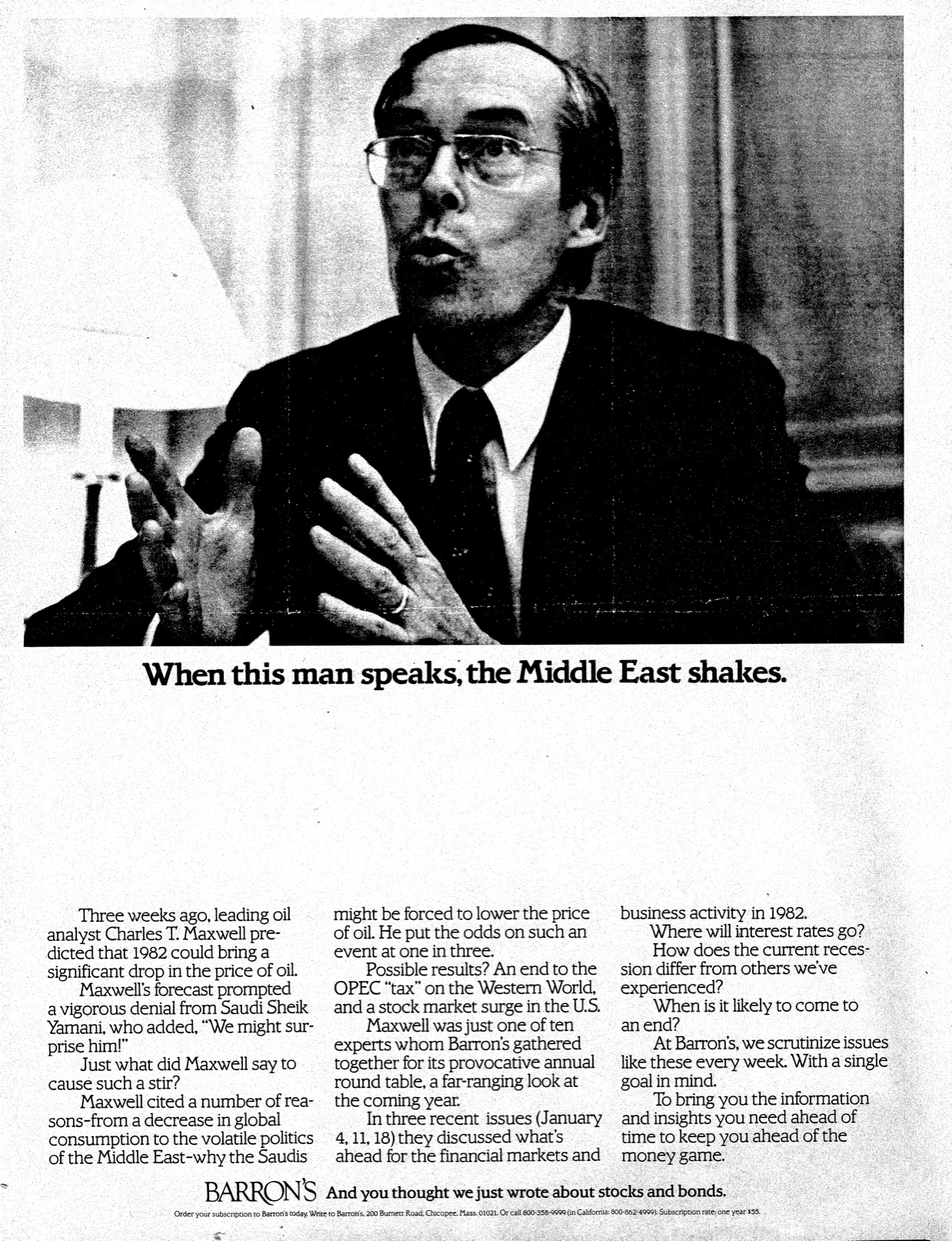
Ad for Barron's, 1975

Barrons.com was launched in 1996 as part of WSJ.com. In 2005, following "its first redesign in nearly 11 years" Barron's relaunched as a standalone product, months after their first Financial Advisor conference.

In September 2008, Barron's acquired the Winner's Circle Organization. In September 2009, Barron's launched Penta as a new section. The section targets "penta-millionaires" (individuals with at least $5 million in assets) with financial advice.

== Employees ==
Famous former and current editors, publishers, and journalists of the magazine include:

- Robert Bleiberg, publisher (1982–1989), editor (1954–1981)
- Alan Abelson, columnist
- Clarence W. Barron, "father of financial journalism" and founder of the newspaper

== See also ==
- William Peter Hamilton
