= Doremus & Co. =

Doremus
- Industry: Advertising Agency
- Founded: 1903
- Headquarters: New York, United States
- Website: http://www.doremus.com

Doremus & Co., more commonly referred to as Doremus, is a business communications agency focusing on both business-to-business and business-to-business-to-consumer audiences. The agency was founded in 1903 by Clarence W. Barron, and has been a unit of Omnicom since 1986. Doremus is headquartered in New York, and has eight offices around the world.

== History ==
In 1903, Doremus was founded by Clarence W. Barron, owner of The Wall Street Journal, in a corner of the Journal's offices at 44 Broad Street in New York City.

It had nine accounts, all from the financial companies that want to advertise in the Journal. Harry Doremus, the agency's namesake, was an assistant who joined the agency from The Wall Street Journal's advertising department. He had no equity in the company and left after two years following a controversy about editorial staff selling advertising.
