= The Boston Post =

Former daily newspaper in New England

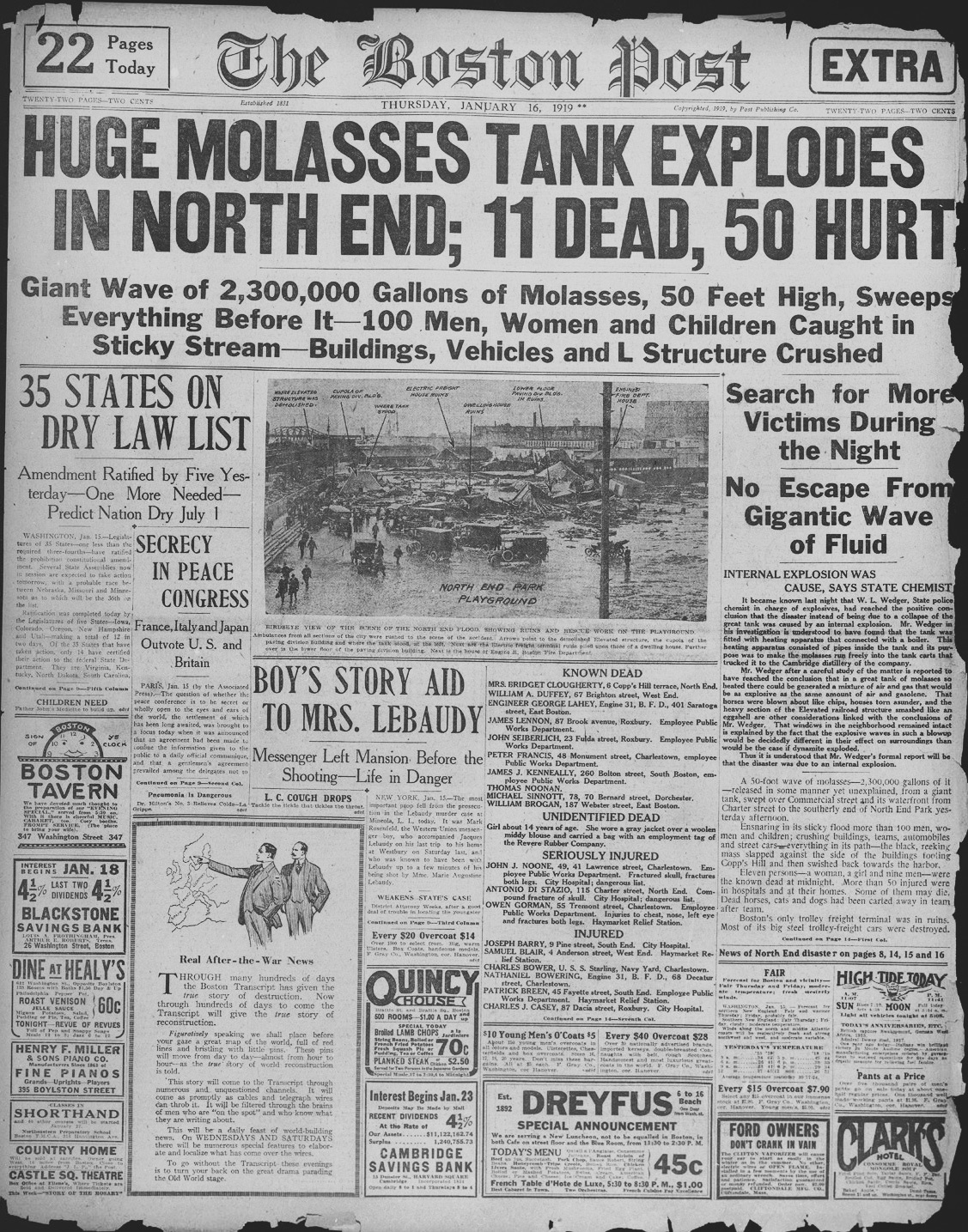
- The Boston Post The January 16, 1919 front page of The Boston Post
- Type: Daily newspaper
- Format: Broadsheet
- Owner: Post Publishing Company (former)
- Founded: 1831
- Ceased publication: 1956
- Language: English
- Headquarters: 42 Congress Street; Boston, Massachusetts; Corner Devonshire & Water Streets; Boston, Massachusetts; 15–17 Milk Street; Boston, Massachusetts; 259 Washington Street; Boston, Massachusetts; United States

The Boston Post was a daily newspaper in New England for over a hundred years before its final shutdown in 1956. The Post was founded in November 1831 by two prominent Boston businessmen, Charles G. Greene and William Beals.

Edwin Grozier bought the paper in 1891. Within two decades, he had built it into easily the largest paper in Boston and New England. Grozier suffered a total physical breakdown in 1920, and turned over day-to-day control of the Post to his son, Richard. Upon Edwin's death in 1924, Richard inherited the paper. Under the younger Grozier, The Boston Post grew into one of the largest newspapers in the country. At its height in the 1930s, it had a circulation of well over a million readers. At the same time, Richard Grozier suffered an emotional breakdown from the death of his wife in childbirth from which he never recovered.

Facing increased competition from the Hearst-run papers in Boston and New York and from radio and television news, the paper suffered a decline in the 1940s and '50s from which it never recovered.

When it ceased publishing in October 1956, its daily circulation was 230,000.

== Former contributors ==
- Olin Downes, music critic.
- Richard Frothingham Jr., a Massachusetts historian, journalist, and politician who was a proprietor and managing editor of The Boston Post.
- Frederick E. Goodrich, journalist and political figure who worked for the Post for 54 years, including a five years as editor-in-chief.
- Robert F. Kennedy, U.S. Attorney General and U.S. Senator; correspondent for The Boston Post in 1948, 1951
- Bernard G Richards
- Kenneth Roberts
- Olga Van Slyke Owens Huckins, literary editor, 1941–1954. Huckins letter to Rachel Carson inspired the book Silent Spring.
- Newton Newkirk was hired by the Post in 1901 and produced the Bingfield Bugleville comic strip that lent its name to Bing Crosby

== "Sunday Magazine" supplement ==
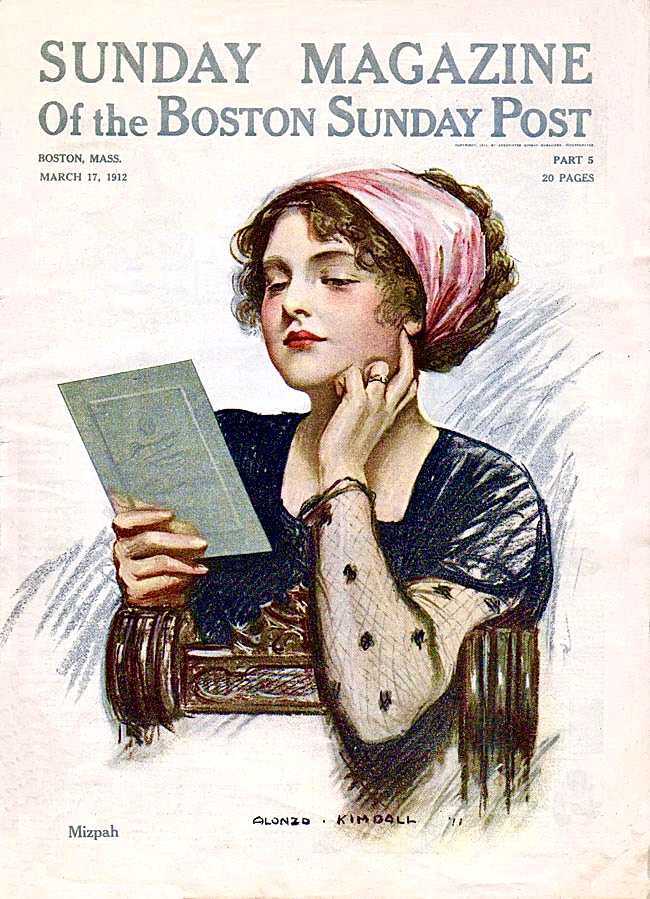
Cover by Alonzo Myron Kimball, 1912

From 1904 through 1916, "Sunday Magazine" was a regular syndicated supplement to Sunday editions of newspapers in various cities across the United States, including the Boston Post, Philadelphia Press, New-York Tribune, Chicago Tribune, St. Louis Republic, Detroit Free Press, and Minneapolis Journal. The supplement in Boston was initially titled "Sunday Magazine of the Boston Sunday Post"; later, as "Boston Sunday Post Sunday Magazine". The regular 20-page periodical has a magazine-like format that is essentially identical to the versions that accompanied other major newspapers in the early 1900s, featuring the same cover illustration, articles, short stories, serials, and advertisements.

== Pulitzer Prizes ==
- 1921 – Meritorious Public Service. The Boston Post was awarded the Pulitzer prize for its investigation and exposure of Charles Ponzi's financial fraud. Ponzi was first exposed by the investigative work directed by Richard Grozier, then acting publisher, and Edward Dunn, long time city editor, after complaints by Bostonians that the returns Ponzi offered were "too good to be true". It was the first time that a Boston paper had won a Pulitzer, and was the last Pulitzer for public service awarded to a Boston paper until the Globe won it in 2003.

== Boston Post Cane tradition ==
In 1909, under the ownership of Edwin Grozier, The Boston Post engaged in its most famous publicity stunt. The paper had 700 ornate, ebony-shafted, gold-capped canes made and contacted the selectmen in Maine, Massachusetts, New Hampshire, and Rhode Island towns. The Boston Post Canes were given to the selectmen with the request that the canes be presented in a ceremony to the town's oldest living man. The custom was expanded to include a community's oldest women in 1930. More than 500 towns in New England still carry on the Boston Post Cane tradition with the original canes they were awarded in 1909.

== Usage ==
According to H. W. Fowler, the first recorded instance of the term O. K. was made in the Boston Morning Post of 1839.

== See also ==
- Boston Daily Advertiser
- Boston Evening Transcript
- The Boston Globe
- Boston Herald
- The Boston Journal
- The Boston Record

== Image gallery ==
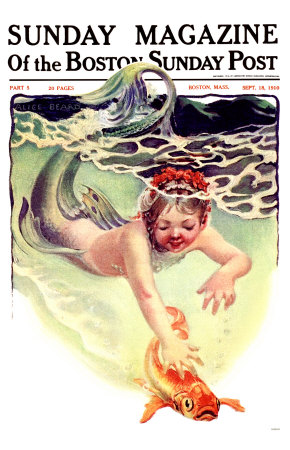
"Sunday Magazine of the Boston Sunday Post" (September 18, 1910)

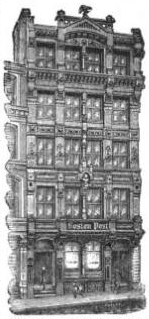
The Boston Post Building, 15–17 Milk Street, Boston, Massachusetts

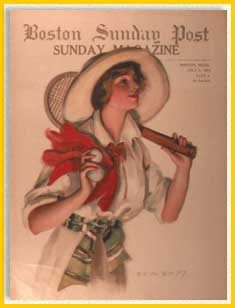
"Boston Sunday Post Sunday Magazine" (July 5, 1914)
