= William F. Kerby =

- Born: William Frederick Kerby; July 28, 1908; Washington, D.C., U.S.
- Died: March 19, 1989 (aged 80); Bethlehem, Pennsylvania, U.S.
- Education: University of Michigan
- Occupation: Former Dow Jones & Company chairman and president
- Years active: 1930–1980
- Spouse: Frances Justina Douglass (m. 1935–1986)
- Children: 2

William Frederick Kerby (July 28, 1908 – July 28, 1989) was chairman and CEO of Dow Jones & Co. and publisher of The Wall Street Journal from 1966 to 1972.

== Biography ==
A native of Washington, D.C., Kerby got his start in the newspaper business working as a police reporter for The Washington Daily News, and as a general assignment reporter for The Wall Street Journal 's D.C. bureau during his summer breaks from college. He graduated from the University of Michigan in 1930 and joined United Press International as a political reporter in Washington, D.C. In 1933, he joined The Wall Street Journal 's D.C. bureau. He later moved to New York City, where he became the right-hand man to managing editor Bernard Kilgore. Future Dow Jones & Company chairman Warren H. Phillips credited Kilgore and Kirby with developing front-page features and other innovations that helped grow the newspaper into the country's largest business daily.

In 1943, Kirby succeeded Kilgore as managing editor after he became a vice president of the Journal 's parent company, Dow Jones & Company. He was promoted to executive editor of The Wall Street Journal and the Dow Jones News Service in 1945 and elected vice president of Dow Jones & Company in 1951. In 1966, he succeeded Kilgore as Dow Jones' president. In 1972, he was elected board chairman, a position that had been vacant since Kilgore's death in 1967, and succeeded as president and chief executive officer by Warren H. Phillips. He remained chief executive officer until 1975. He stepped down as chairman in 1978, but remained on the board until 1980. He died from cancer on July 28, 1989 at his home in Bethlehem, Pennsylvania.

Business positions
Preceded by Bernard Kilgore	President of Dow Jones & Company; 1966–1972	Succeeded by Warren H. Phillips
Preceded by Bernard Kilgore	CEO of Dow Jones & Company; 1966–1975	Succeeded by Warren H. Phillips
