= Clarence W. Barron =

American financial editor and publisher

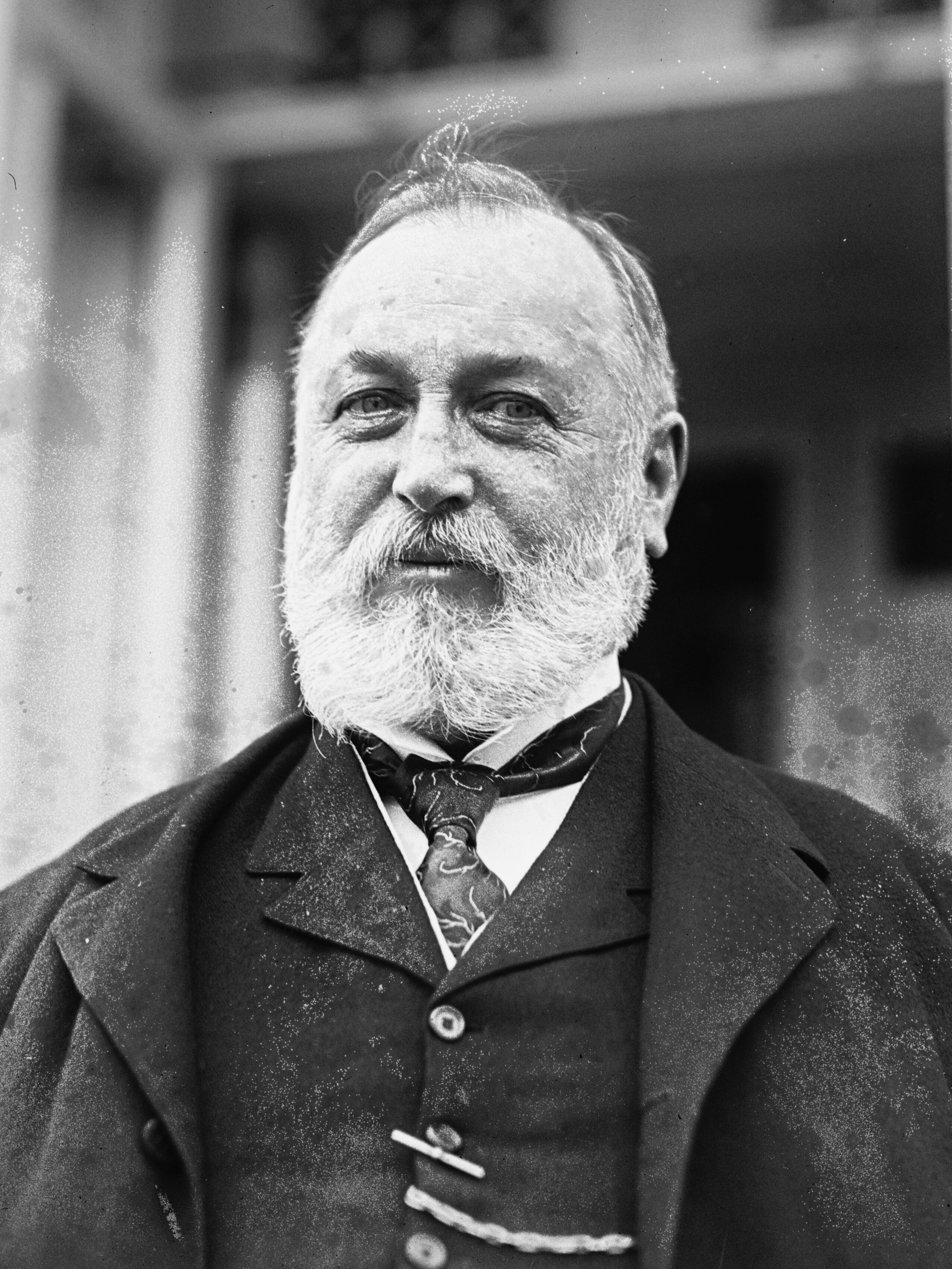
- Barron in 1921
- Born: Clarence Walker Barron; July 2, 1855; Boston, Massachusetts, U.S.
- Died: October 2, 1928 (aged 73); Battle Creek, Michigan, U.S.
- Occupation: Financial journalist
- Spouse: Jessie Waldron (m. 1900)
- Children: 2 adopted daughters (Jane & Martha)

External image
- Photo of Clarence W. Barron from The Wall Street Journal site.

Clarence Walker Barron (July 2, 1855 – October 2, 1928) was an American financial editor and publisher who founded the Dow Jones financial journal, Barron's National Financial Weekly, later renamed Barron's Magazine.

He was one of the most influential figures in the history of Dow Jones. As a career newsman described as a "short, rotund powerhouse", he died holding the posts of president of Dow Jones and de facto manager of The Wall Street Journal. He is considered the founder of modern financial journalism.

== Early life and education ==
Barron was born in Boston and graduated from Boston English High School in 1873.

== Career ==
Barron began his journalism career as a reporter for the Boston Daily News from 1875 to 1878 and the Boston Evening Transcript from 1878 to 1887. At the Transcript, Barron gradually focused on financial news. He founded the Boston News Bureau in 1887 and the Philadelphia News Bureau in 1897, supplying financial news to brokers. Barron sought to improve objectivity in financial journalism to reflect what he called "the public interest, the financial truth for investors and the funds that should support the widow and the orphan."

In 1902, Barron purchased Dow Jones & Company for $130,000, following the death of co-founder Charles Dow. In 1912, he appointed himself president of Dow Jones and its newspaper The Wall Street Journal. Under Barron, The Wall Street Journal gained new printing presses and expanded reporting staff, with circulation increasing from 7,000 in 1912 to over 18,000 in 1920 to beyond 50,000 by 1930.

In 1913, he gave testimony to the Massachusetts Public Service Commission regarding a slush fund held by the New Haven Railroad. In 1920, he investigated Charles Ponzi, inventor of the Ponzi scheme, for The Boston Post. His aggressive questioning and commonsense reasoning helped lead to Ponzi's arrest and conviction.

Barron also established the financial advertising agency Doremus & Co. in 1903. In 1921, he founded the Dow Jones financial journal, Barron's National Financial Weekly, later renamed Barron's Magazine, and served as its first editor. He priced the magazine at 10 cents an issue and saw circulation explode to 30,000 by 1926, with high popularity among investors and financiers.

== Personal life ==
Barron married Jessie Maria Bartauex Waldron in 1900 and adopted her daughters, Jane and Martha. Jessie was born in Nova Scotia in 1852, and was married to a man named Samuel Waldron, twenty years her senior, in New York City in 1873. She was no longer living with him by the 1880 census, when she was located in Boston with her two daughters, living in the household of her aunt, Sarah J. Bartauex, who was a dressmaker. Samuel Waldron died in 1882. In the 1900 census, taken in Cohasset, MA on June ninth, Jessie Waldron appears in Clarence Barron's household as a "housekeeper" though her daughters are already listed as adopted daughters of Barron. The two would marry later that month on June twenty-first, in Boston. Considering the wide gulf between their class backgrounds, it is likely that their relationship began while she was employed as a housekeeper in his household. A significant collection of hers and her daughters' garments are housed at the Cohasset Historical Society. Jessie Barron died on May 23, 1918.

After Jane married Hugh Bancroft in 1907, Jane Barron became a prominent member of the Boston Brahmin Bancroft family. Martha Barron married H. Wendell Endicott, heir apparent to the Endicott Shoe Company. Mr. and Mrs. Barron and the Endicotts are buried in a joint family plot at the historic Forest Hills Cemetery in the Jamaica Plain neighborhood of Boston.

Barron was a prominent lay member of the Massachusetts New Church (Swedenborgians).

Barron died in 1928 in Battle Creek, Michigan.

== Legacy ==
After his death, Barron's responsibilities were split between his son-in-law Hugh Bancroft, who became president of Dow Jones, and his friend Kenneth C. Hogate, who became the managing editor of the Journal.

They Told Barron (1930) and More They Told Barron (1931), two books edited by Arthur Pound and S. T. Moore were published that showed his close connections and his role as a confidant to top financiers from New York City society, such as Charles M. Schwab. As a result, he has been called "the diarist of the American Dream." (Reutter 148) This has led to allegations that he was too close to those he covered.

The Bancroft family remained the majority shareholder of Dow Jones & Company until July 31, 2007, when Rupert Murdoch's News Corp. won the support of 32 percent of the Dow Jones voting shares controlled by the Bancroft family, enough to ensure a comfortable margin of victory.

== Books ==
- The Boston Stock Exchange (1893)
- The Federal Reserve Act: A discussion of the principles and operations of the new Banking Act as originally published in the Wall Street Journal and the Boston News Bureau, including a description of the financial, commercial and industrial characteristics of each of the Federal Reserve Districts and the Federal Reserve Act fully indexed, with pertinent legislation (1914): a.k.a. "Twenty-Eight Essays on the Federal Reserve Act".
- The Audacious War (1915)
- The Mexican Problem (1917)
- War Finance, As Viewed From the Roof of the World in Switzerland (1919)
- A World Remaking; or, Peace Finance (1920)
- Lord's Money (1922)
- My Creed (unk.)
- They Told Barron (1930)
- More They Told Barron (1931)

== See also ==
- William Peter Hamilton
