= Felix Zulauf =

Swiss businessman (born 1950)

Felix W. Zulauf
- Born: Felix Walter Zulauf; 1950 (age 75–76)
- Occupations: Hedge fund manager; banking executive
- Children: 1
- Website: Official website

Felix W. Zulauf (born 1950) is a Swiss hedge fund manager and former banking executive who founded Zulauf Asset Management, a Zug, Switzerland-based hedge fund founded in 1990 with over $1.7 billion in assets under management according to MacroAxis. Zulauf has been a regular member of the Barron's Roundtable for 30 years.

== Career ==
Zulauf started his investment career as a trader for Swiss Bank, then training in research and portfolio management in New York, Zurich and in Paris. He joined Union Bank of Switzerland in 1977, ultimately becoming the head of the institutional portfolio management unit and global strategist for the UBS Group.

=== On climate change ===
In June 2022, the magazine "the market" published a paper by Zulauf, in which he questions man-made climate change, saying the scientific evidence is not given.
