= Clarence Richeson =

American murderer

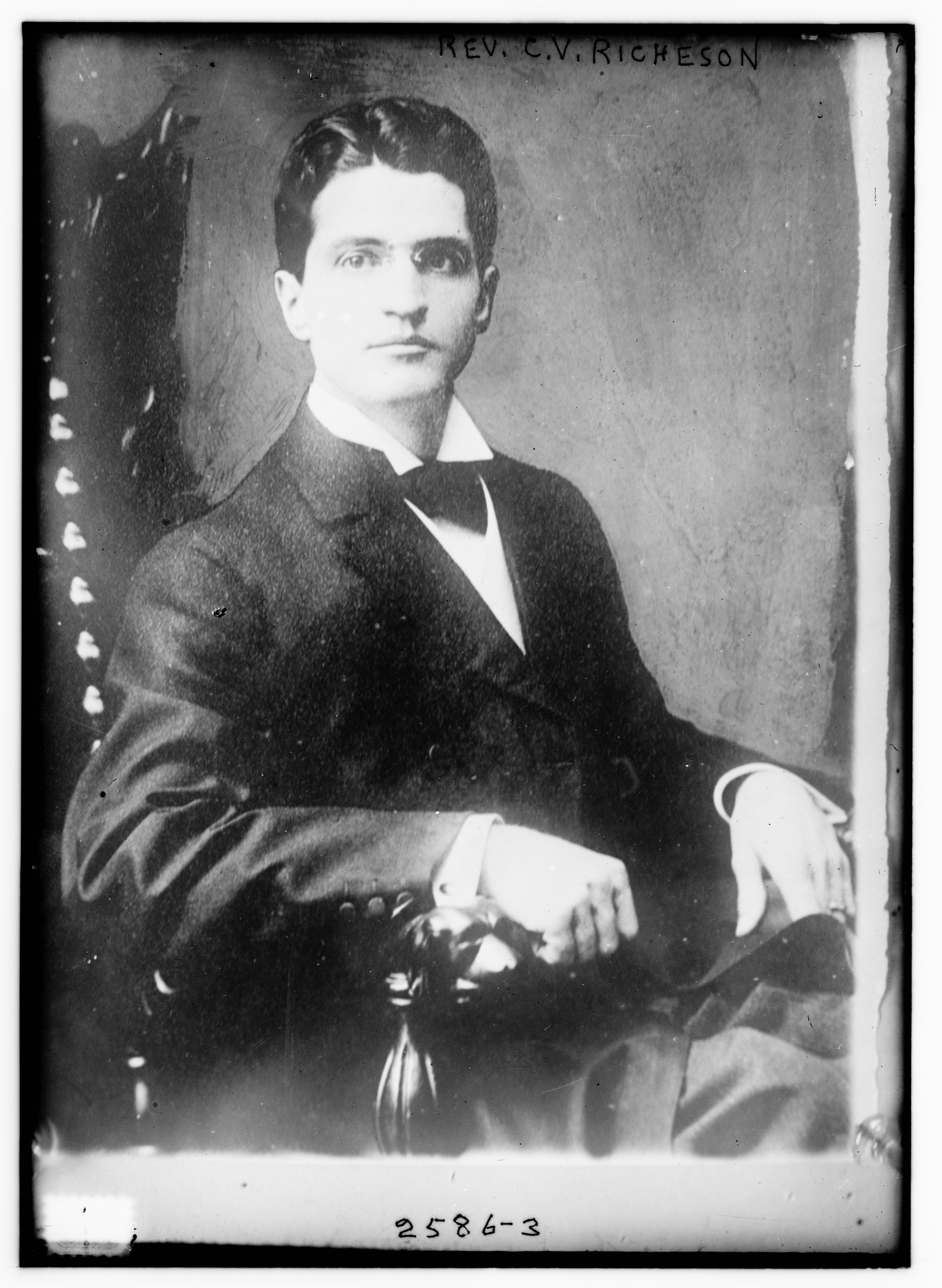
- Born: February 15, 1876; Amherst, Virginia, U.S.
- Died: May 21, 1912 (aged 36); Charlestown State Prison, Massachusetts, U.S.
- Spouse: Violet Edmands (fiance)
- Status: Executed by electrocution
- Conviction: First degree murder

Clarence Virgil Thompson Richeson (February 15, 1876 – May 21, 1912) was an American reverend in the Baptist denomination who was executed for the murder of his fiancée Avis Willard Linnell on October 14, 1911, at the YWCA in Boston.

== Biography ==
=== Early life ===
Richeson was born in Amherst, Virginia, the son of a tobacco farmer and his first wife of three. Richeson left home at age 13, moved to Lynchburg, Virginia, and worked at several jobs. Throughout much of his life he worked at a variety of jobs. Early on, he was ambitious and wanted to be a clergyman. He began to prepare for college at Amherst Academy.

From 1892 to 1895 he worked for his cousin W. J. Richeson and continued his studies at the academy in Carrollton, Missouri. He joined the Trotter Baptist Church of Carroll County. At age 17, he went into an unconscious state and was in bed for one or two days after a nocturnal emission. He saw a Dr. Cooper who gave him medication that caused an allergic skin reaction. Throughout his life, he had a history of similar attacks many of which he attributed to nocturnal emissions and he was inordinately obsessive about his own sexuality. Before he was 18 he was engaged to two girls at the same time. They broke off the engagements when they learned of a third fiancée in Kansas City.

In 1895, at the age of 19, he was affiliated with the Third Baptist Church in Saint Louis. In 1896 he took a brief "vacation" in southern Missouri where he met a girl and again became engaged. This engagement was soon broken off. He grew quite ill one time in 1896 and went to stay with a cousin in Potosi, Missouri. One night he became quite delirious and was walking around outside. A doctor was sent for and stayed through the night. He gave Richeson some sedatives and declared him insane. On the advice of the doctor, the cousin took Richeson to Missouri Baptist Sanitarium (now Missouri Baptist Medical Center) where he remained for several weeks. There are no medical records of his stay there except that "he apparently had some kind of mental derangement." He then returned home to Virginia and stayed there for three years.

=== Education and career ===
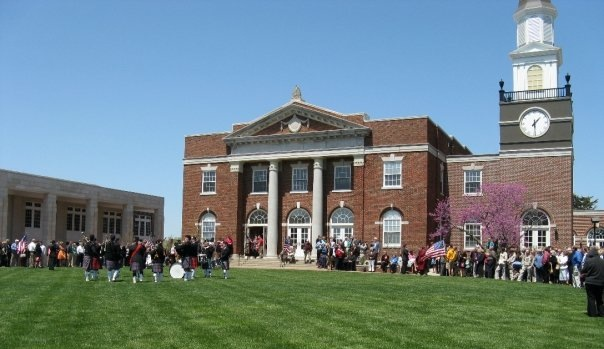
The quad at William Jewell College which Richeson attended beginning in 1899.

In 1899 he entered the William Jewell College in Liberty, Missouri. While living in Missouri, he matriculated at The Southern Baptist Seminary in Louisville, Kentucky. He was ordained as a Baptist minister at the Third Baptist Church. As a student residing in Liberty, he became preacher at the Budd Park Baptist Church in Kansas City from 1901 to 1904. The trustees wrote for his resignation after he allegedly proposed to three girls, ending what may have been his longest preaching tenure. He also preached at a mission church at Kansas City. He was expelled from college for cheating in 1905. However, an officer of the college wrote Richeson's father that "Clarence had become deranged" and they could no longer keep him as a student.

Richeson entered Newton Theological Seminary, Newton, Massachusetts, in the fall of 1906, finally graduated in 1909 and took a postgraduate class in 1910. From April to September, 1907, he accepted an invitation to a church in El Paso, Texas. While there he was an "inmate" in the home of Milton Estes. He had "a mental disorder which for a considerable period rendered him insane." Dr. Thompson W. Grace was called to the house in July and found him in a cataleptic state. He raved against some men and imagined that someone was seeking to do him injury. Paranoid thinking began to be more a part of his life.

After four months, in August 1907, he returned to a friend's house in Georgetown, Massachusetts. He first met Violet and Rose Edmands in 1907. Violet and Rose were the only two children of Moses Grant Edmands and his wife Lydia "Lilly" Caroline Benton Edmands. He referred to his wife and daughters as his three flowers. Violet and Richeson began seeing each other weekly from December 1910, until their engagement was announced in March. In 1907 he was again engaged, possibly to two women at the same time.

Richeson took a pastorate at the Baptist Church in Hyannis, Massachusetts, on Cape Cod in June, 1908. Once Dr. Ferdinand A. Binford, a member of the Church removed a callous from the Richeson's hand and that night, he was called to Richeson's boarding room. When he arrived he found two or three members of the Church restraining Richeson. He appeared at times to be partly conscious and other times to be practically unconscious with no knowledge of what he was doing or saying. Richeson talked irrationally, raved incoherently and physically manifested an abnormal degree of strength. The doctor gave him a shot of morphine which quieted him. In the morning he was rational but physically weak and apparently as "normal as he ever was."

Dr. Charles Harwood met Richeson in the summer of 1909 when, early in December, Richeson reported a robbery from his room. The State Police asked Dr. Harwood to investigate the robbery because of curious circumstances. Dr. Harwood inadvertently met Richeson on a train and discussed the robbery. Dr. Harwood concluded "his whole state of mind appeared insane." On a subsequent meeting with Richeson "he confirmed the impression of a man suffering from insanity."

In April 1910, he resigned his pastorate after two years in Hyannis having awakened considerable adverse feeling in the Church. On May 20, 1910, the prominent Immanuel Baptist Church in Newton, Massachusetts, voted to call him as minister and he first preached there June 1, 1910. He soon met 16-year-old Avis Linnell and on December 19, her birthday, he gave her an engagement ring. Richeson wrote a letter of resignation to the church on November 2. The Church voted 30 to 15 not to accept Richeson's resignation.

=== Relationships ===
One Sunday after delivering his sermon while a preacher at the Budd Park Baptist Church in Kansas City between the year 1901 and 1904, three girls approached him weeping, each claiming he had asked her to marry him. The trustees quickly wrote for his resignation ending what may have been his longest preaching tenure. He had assumed the position of pastor at a church in Hyannis, in June 1908 when he first met Avis Linnell. Avis' mother stated that she loved him as a son. On her 17th birthday, December 19, 1908, he gave her a gold engagement ring. The engagement was announced at a small party. A Hyannis newspaper, The Patriot, published the announcement of Richeson's engagement to Violet Edmands on March 13, 1911. Early in March, Avis' mother received a letter from her that Avis' engagement was broken off. On 1 July he returned to Hyannis for the two months where he resumed intimacy with Avis who was home for the summer. July was about the time she became pregnant. The people of Hyannisport knew the engagement had been broken and assumed that the couple spending so much time together had renewed the engagement. At the end of summer Richeson returned to his Church. Avis returned to her studies in Boston and the room at the Y.W.C.A.

The marriage date for Miss Edmands was set for October 31, 1911 (Reformation Day). Avis Linnell's death was 17 days before the scheduled wedding. Miss Linnell left Hyannisport in September 1910 to study at the New England Conservatory of Music. She took a room at the Boston YWCA The date for her marriage was set for October 1910. She wore the engagement ring until Christmas, 1910 when she gave it back to Richeson "to be repaired."

Richeson later in 1912 claimed to Dr. Briggs that his first sexual encounter was not until 1904 and he had no others until 1910 with Avis Linnell.

== Mental health history ==
Affidavits taken in 1912 revealed a family history of mental health problems. An uncle on his mother's side was committed, in 1883, to Western State Hospital, Staunton, Virginia, and died there in the violent-patient ward a year later. A first cousin was confined to an asylum in Missouri. Seven other first or second cousins were described as deranged or insane. Throughout his life physicians and alienists thought heredity played some role in his mental disorders.

A great deal is known about Clarence Richeson's life. Dr. Lloyd Vernon Briggs, Director of the Massachusetts Mental Health Society, was asked by Governor Eugene N. Foss on April 29, 1912, to examine Richeson and determine his mental condition. Dr. Briggs clearly put a lot of thought and effort into the Governor's request. Most of what is known about Richeson is from a large variety of affidavits from people that had close contact with Richeson. Importantly he also recorded discussions with Richeson which are abstracted below.

At age three Richeson fell down the front steps, leaving a lifetime "knubble" on the back of his head. This was the first of at least five significant traumas to the head he received during his lifetime also affecting his physical and mental health. When he was six, his brother struck him in the head and he "slept" until the doctor arrived. That left a 2 1/2 inch scar. At age seven, he fell off a horse and his head struck a rock. That left a 3-inch bald spot. He had a headache and ringing in his head for the next five years. Also in childhood he was hit in the head by a child holding a rock and was unconscious for 24 hours.

One day in April 1911, Richeson had another very severe trauma to his head. As he was stepping from an elevator the operator mistakenly started it. It was necessary to call a physician and he was in bed for three days. When he got up he dragged one of his legs when he walked. This difficulty worsened until he seemed to have lost the use of both legs and could not bear his own weight. The trouble with his legs then passed. However, on 1 May Richeson appeared at the Edmands house and had one of his attacks. Mrs. Edmands went every day to Richeson's lodging house and stayed until evening from 1 May to 28 June. The evening of 18 June a Dr. David C. Dow (affidavit) was called to Richeson's. The next morning he told Mrs. Edmands that Richeson "should be committed to an institution, not necessarily an insane hospital, and I strongly advised her to put him under the care of men well versed in mental diseases."

Richeson was granted a two-month leave from his Church for a "mental breakdown."

Nine years later in 1921, L. Vernon Briggs, M.D., Director of the Massachusetts Society for Mental Hygiene reviewed what was known of Clarence Richeson. Dr. Briggs had previously prepared a report for Governor Eugene Foss on Richeson's condition for the Governor's consideration of clemency. Governor Foss also consulted with other alienists. In "The Manner of Man That Kills" he concludes that Clarence Richeson "was, I think the only man ever executed in Massachusetts without a trial. He was a victim of hysteria with delusions, hallucinations, amnesic periods, and delirium. He had exhibited signs and had had attacks of this disease for years, had been recognized as mentally unsound by several physicians who advised specialists in mental diseases to attend him. Still, he was allowed to 'carry on' until his acts resulted in the death of a young girl in this state." Based upon the Spencer, Czolgosz, Richeson cases and others Dr. Briggs proposed several broad ranging reforms for early recognition and management of the mentally ill before situations of this sort could arise.

A contrary view was put forth by Theodore Dreiser. In 1892, he "began to observe a certain type of crime in the United States that proved very common. It seemed to spring form the fact that almost every young person was possessed of an ingrown ambition to be somebody financially and socially." "Fortune hunting became a disease" with the frequent result of a peculiarly American kind of crime." An example is the murder of Avis Linnell. By 1919 this murder was the basis of one of two separate novels begun by Dreiser. The 1906 murder of Grace Brown by Chester Gillette eventually became the basis for An American Tragedy." At some point, while a student, Richeson made an appointment with Dr. Phillip C. Palmer, M.D. Richeson said "I know you will think I am crazy but . . . I want you to castrate me." Dr. Palmer replied "I am sure you must be crazy" and refused. Richeson went on to explain he was to become a minister. He did not think he could associate with women without losing control of himself.

December 1901 until March 1902 he saw Dr. G. M. Phillips of Saint Louis. In 1912 Dr. Phillips gave an affidavit which is one of the most detailed insight into Richeson's health along with Dr. Briggs records from 1912. "He complained of pains in his head, back, testes, and limbs; that he was dizzy, his memory was poor and he was unable to concentrate mentally. . . He was a perfect picture and complete picture of 'Neurasthenia sexualis." Richeson had discovered a mild varicocele which he obsessed over and "ascribed his wretched physical and mental state to it." He despaired of ever being made well again and rather courted death. Dr. Phillips recommended not removing the varicocele. However, he consented to Richeson's request and surgically removed it in January 1902. Afterwards Richeson showed pronounced improvement and became hopeful and cheerful. Still Dr. Phillips concluded that Richeson "at this time he was not responsible for his any act that was associated with his sexual organs; that such conditions as these, in my judgment are competent to set in motion sexual manifestations to the end that all reason is overbalanced, and one's acts are beyond control."

== Murder and execution ==
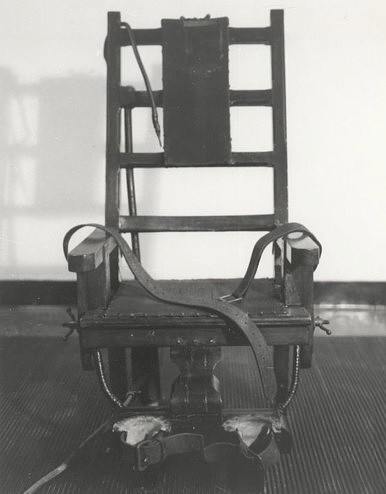
An early electric chair, similar to that used for Richeson's execution.

Avis Linnell's death on October 14, 1911, at the YWCA in Boston was initially thought to be of natural causes due to what Dr. George Burgess Mcgrath, the Medical Examiner of Boston, described as Dr. Timothy D. Lehane, the coroner's physician's, incompetence. Mcgrath said,

In this instance notice of the death was given to the Medical Examiner by a physician called into a students' boarding house because the girl had died suddenly.

There was no primary suspicion of foul play and it was only when the post mortem examination disclosed a condition in the stomach suggesting poisoning by potassium cyanide that death from causes other than natural was suggested.

The further discovery of a physical condition compatible with suicide strongly suggested this motive of death and only the care and diligence of the Medical Examiner Leary, who had charge of the case, led to a further investigation by the police resulting in the conviction of Richeson.

The cyanide was purchased October 10, but Avis' death was not until Saturday, October 14, four days later. The pharmacist told the police of the purchase of cyanide and Richeson was taken into custody on October 20.

A grand jury brought an indictment on November 2 containing five counts: "that he gave", "that he sent and conveyed", "that he caused the poison to be taken and swallowed," "that he gave it pretending it was a medical preparation, and "that he did assault and poison with intent to murder by this giving and causing to be taken." He was arraigned and pleaded "Not Guilty" on November 13. The trial was set for January 15, 1912.

At four in the morning, December 20, Richeson partially emasculated himself in his cell with a sharp piece of metal. At the jail hospital, Dr. Lothrop found it necessary to complete the emasculation and closed the wound. A few days later, Richeson pulled the stitches from the wound and Dr. Lothrop was called in again.

No jury was ever selected because on January 5, he retracted his plea of not guilty and pleaded guilty to murder in the first degree. The guilty plea was made before Judge George A. Sanderson on January 9 and the judge had no sentencing options other than death. The date for electrocution was set for May 19. Only after sentencing did his lawyers raise the question of insanity. They employed two alienists who individually made reports on April 24 and May 8.

Governor Foss denied Richeson's petition for clemency, May 16, stating that

[His] family is heavily afflicted with insanity, that he himself is neurotic, a somnabulist, and a neurasthenic; that he is subject to extreme emotional disturbances, marked by loss of memory, . . . diagnosed as hysterical insanity . . . (or) hysterical delirium hysterical insanity . . . (or) hysterical delirium . . . these attacks are of brief duration . . .his crime was not committed by him during such an attack.

Reverend Richeson was executed in an electric chair on May 21, 1912, at 12:17 a.m. It was the fourteenth such execution since Massachusetts adopted the electric chair. It was the most successful to that time since the current only had to be applied once and the death affidavit was signed 15 minutes later. The prior Sunday, May 19, the crowds outside the prison became so large that the outer gates were closed to prevent the crowd encroaching on the prison premises and a special police patrol was assigned. The next day more than two thousand people stood outside the prison walls for hours in pouring rain. After the execution, the crowd lingered through the night and did not fully disperse until the following morning.

== Media coverage ==
The New York Times and Boston Globe ran extensive coverage on this murder and citations are used to complement and supplement Briggs's accounts. The New York Times also provided extensive coverage extending beyond the date of execution.
