= Dow Jones average =

Dow Jones average may refer to:

- Dow Jones Industrial Average
- Dow Jones Transportation Average
- Dow Jones Utility Average
- Dow Jones Composite Average
