= List of assets owned by News Corp =

News Corp logo

This is a list of assets owned by the mass media company News Corp.

== Television and radio ==
=== News Corp Australia ===
- Australian News Channel
  - News24
  - News24 Weather
  - News24 World

=== News UK and Ireland ===
- News Broadcasting
  - TalkTV
  - Talkradio
  - Talksport
  - Talksport 2
  - Times Radio
  - Virgin Radio
  - Virgin Radio Anthems
  - Virgin Radio Chilled
  - Virgin Radio Groove
  - FM104
  - Dublin's Q102
  - Cork's 96FM
  - c103
  - Live 95FM
  - LMFM
  - U105

== Advertising, branding, Internet and tech ==
- News.com.au
- DAZN (6%)
- Punters.com.au – Australian horse racing and bookmaker affiliate
- SuperCoach
- tips.com.au
- hipages
- racenet.com.au
- odds.com.au
- Mogo
- onebigswitch.com.au
- Knewz, a news aggregator
- realestate.com.au
- Business Spectator
- eurekareport.com.au
- Australia's Best Recipes – bestrecipes.com.au
- delicious.com.au including extensions delicious. Travel, delicious. Eat Out, the American Express delicious. Month Out, Studio delicious., delicious. Drinks and delicious. Produce Awards
- Kidspot.com.au
- homelife.com.au
- myfun.com
- Storyful
- SUDDENLY – Content Agency
- Medium Rare Content Agency
- HT&E (Here, There & Everywhere)
- News Xtend

== Magazines and inserts (digital and print) ==
=== News Corp Australia ===
- body+soul
- Business Daily
- delicious
- Escape
- GQ Australia
- Hit
- Kidspot
- Mansion Australia
- Motoring
- Sportsman
- Super Food Ideas
- taste.com.au
- The Deal
- The Weekend Australian Magazine
- Vogue Australia
- Vogue Living
- Whimn
- Wish

== News and magazines (digital and print) ==
=== United Kingdom ===
==== News UK ====
- The Sun
- The Times
- The Sunday Times
- Press Association (part owned, News UK is one of 26 shareholders)
- The Times Literary Supplement (TLS)

=== Australia ===
==== News Corp Australia ====
===== National =====
- The Australian including weekly insert magazine The Deal and monthly insert magazine (wish)
- The Weekend Australian
- News.com.au

===== New South Wales =====
- The Daily Telegraph
- The Sunday Telegraph including insert magazine sundaymagazine

===== Victoria =====
- Herald Sun
- Sunday Herald Sun including insert magazine sundaymagazine

===== Queensland =====
- The Courier-Mail including weekly insert magazine QWeekend
- The Sunday Mail
- Brisbane News

===== South Australia =====
- The Advertiser including the monthly insert The Adelaide magazine
- Sunday Mail

===== Tasmania =====
- The Mercury
- The Sunday Tasmanian

===== Northern Territory =====
- Northern Territory News
- Sunday Territorian

==== Community suburban newspapers ====
===== Sydney =====
Cumberland-Courier Community Newspapers

- Blacktown Advocate
- Canterbury-Bankstown Express
- Central
- Central Coast Express Advocate
- Fairfield Advance
- Hills Shire Times
- Hornsby and Upper North Shore Advocate
- Inner West Courier
- Liverpool Leader
- Macarthur Chronicle
- Mt Druitt-St Marys Standard
- NINETOFIVE
- North Shore Times
- Northern District Times
- NORTHSIDE
- Parramatta Advertiser
- Penrith Press
- Rouse Hill Times
- Southern Courier
- The Manly Daily
- The Mosman Daily
- Village Voice Balmain
- Wentworth Courier

===== Melbourne =====
Leader Community Newspapers

- Bayside Leader
- Berwick/Pakenham Cardinia Leader
- Brimbank Leader
- Caulfield Glen Eira/Port Philip Leader
- Cranbourne Leader
- Dandenong/Springvale Dandenong Leader
- Diamond Valley Leader
- Frankston Standard/Hastings Leader
- Free Press Leader
- Heidelberg Leader
- Hobsons Bay Leader
- Hume Leader
- Knox Leader
- Lilydale & Yarra Valley Leader
- Manningham Leader
- Maribyrnong Leader
- Maroondah Leader
- Melbourne Leader
- Melton/Moorabool Leader
- Moonee Valley Leader
- Moorabbin Kingston/Moorabbin Glen Eira Leader
- Mordialloc Chelsea Leader
- Moreland Leader
- Mornington Peninsula Leader
- Northcote Leader
- Preston Leader
- Progress Leader
- Stonnington Leader
- Sunbury/Macedon Ranges Leader
- Waverley/Oakleigh Monash Leader
- Whitehorse Leader
- Whittlesea Leader
- Wyndham Leader

===== Brisbane =====
Quest Community Newspapers

- Albert & Logan News (Fri)
- Albert & Logan News (Wed)
- Caboolture Shire Herald
- Caloundra Journal
- City News
- City North News
- City South News
- Ipswich News
- Logan West Leader
- Maroochy Journal
- North-West News
- Northern Times
- Northside Chronicle
- Pine Rivers Press/North Lakes Times
- Redcliffe and Bayside Herald
- South-East Advertiser
- South-West News/Springfield News
- Southern Star
- The Noosa Journal
- weekender
- Westside News
- Wynnum Herald
- Weekender Essential Sunshine Coast

===== Adelaide =====
Messenger Newspapers

- Adelaide Matters
- City Messenger
- City North Messenger
- East Torrens Messenger
- Eastern Courier Messenger
- Guardian Messenger
- Hills & Valley Messenger
- Leader Messenger
- News Review Messenger
- Portside Messenger
- Southern Times Messenger
- Weekly Times Messenger

===== Darwin, Northern Territory =====
Sun (NT) newspapers

- Darwin Sun
- Litchfield Sun
- Palmerston Sun

==== Regional and rural newspapers ====
===== New South Wales =====
- Tweed Sun
- Tweed Daily News

===== Victoria =====
- Echo
- Geelong Advertiser
- Geelong News
- The Weekly Times

===== Queensland =====
- Bowen Independent
- Burdekin Advocate
- Cairns Sun
- Gold Coast Bulletin
- Gold Coast Sun
- Herbert River Express
- Home Hill Observer
- Innisfail Advocate
- Northern Miner
- Port Douglas & Mossman Gazette
- Tablelander – Atherton
- Tablelands Advertiser
- The Cairns Post
- The Noosa News
- The Sunshine Coast Daily
- Townsville Bulletin
- Toowoomba Chronicle
- Townsville Sun
- weekender
- Daily Mercury (Mackay)

===== Tasmania =====
- Derwent Valley Gazette
- Tasmanian Country

===== Northern Territory =====
- Centralian Advocate

=== Papua New Guinea ===
- Papua New Guinea Post-Courier (63%)

=== United States ===
- New York Post
- California Post
- Dow Jones & Company

Consumer Media Group

- The Wall Street Journal – US financial newspaper
- Barron's – weekly financial markets magazine
- MarketWatch – financial news and information website
- Financial News – UK weekly financial newspaper
- Investor's Business Daily – US investment newspaper
- Mansion Global – global luxury property website turned magazine
- Private Equity News – European business magazine

Enterprise Media Group

- Dow Jones Newswires – global, real-time news and information provider.
- Factiva – provides business news and information together with content delivery tools and services.
- Dow Jones Financial Information Services – produces databases, electronic media, newsletters, conferences, directories, and other information services on specialised markets and industry sectors.
- Betten Financial News – Dutch language financial and economic news service.
- Dow Jones Insight
- Dow Jones Companies & Executives
- Dow Jones Anti-Corruption
- Dow Jones Watchlist
- Dow Jones Private Equity Analyst
- Dow Jones VentureSource

Strategic Alliances

- STOXX (33%) – joint venture with Deutsche Boerse and SWG Group for the development and distribution of Dow Jones STOXX indices.

== Book publishing ==
- HarperCollins
  - 4th Estate
  - Collins
  - Ecco Press
  - Harlequin Enterprises
  - Harper Perennial
  - Harper Voyager
  - HMH Books & Media
  - Kappa Books
  - Modern Publishing
  - Unisystems Inc.
  - Zondervan Publishing (Christian publishing company taken over by HarperCollins in 1988)
  - Thomas Nelson (Christian publishing company taken over by HarperCollins in 2011)
  - Inspirio – religious gift production
  - 3000 Pictures (joint venture with Sony Pictures) – film and television production company

== Others ==
- Brisbane Broncos (68.87%)
- Move (80%)
  - realtor.com
- REA Group (60%)

== Former assets ==
=== Sold ===
- TV Guide
  - TV Guide Magazine
- Dow Jones Local Media Group
- Star
- San Antonio Express-News
- Armada Holdings
- Foxtel (65%)
- South China Morning Post
- Seventeen
- Amplify Education
- Ansett Australia
- Daily Racing Form
- The Weekly Standard
- Boston Herald
- The Fiji Times
- Myspace
- Vedomosti (33%) – Russia's leading financial newspaper (joint venture with Financial Times and Independent Media). (Stake sold in 2015)
- Los Angeles Dodgers
- Remodelista (2016–2019)
- Gardenista (2016–2019)
- Nickelodeon (Australia and New Zealand) (35%) (joint venture with Paramount Global) (Sold stake in 2023)
  - Nick Jr.
  - NickMusic

=== Defunct ===
- Authonomy via HarperCollins (closed in 2015)
- The Daily (2011–2012)
- News of the World (1843–2011) (closed)
- Today (1986–1995)
- The London Paper (2006–2009)
- Consolidated Media Holdings (2007–2012)
- Publishing and Broadcasting Limited (1994–2007)
- Sky News Business/Your Money (2008–2019)
- Sci-Fi (2019–2024)
- Far Eastern Economic Review
- Fox Funny (2019–2023)
- Big League (1920–2020)
- Wall Street Journal Europe
- The Wall Street Journal Asia
- Wall Street Journal Radio Network
- SmartMoney
- Heat Street

== See also ==
- Lists of corporate assets
- 21st Century Fox
- Fox Corporation
