= Dow Jones Composite Average =

Stock market index

The Dow Jones Composite Average is the stock market index composed of 65 prominent companies traded on both exchanges, maintained and tracked by S&P Dow Jones Indices. The average's components include every stock from the Dow Jones Industrial Average (30 components), the Dow Jones Transportation Average (20), and the Dow Jones Utility Average (15).

== Components ==
- 3M Co. (MMM) (conglomerates)
- AES Corporation (The) (AES) (electric utilities)
- Alaska Air Group, Inc. (ALK) (regional airlines)
- American Airlines Group Inc. (AAL) (major airlines)
- American Electric Power Co., Inc. (AEP) (electric utilities)
- American Express Co. (AXP) (credit services)
- American Water Works Company, Inc. (AWK) (water utilities)
- Amgen Inc. (AMGN) (drug manufacturers)
- Apple Inc. (AAPL) (consumer goods)
- Atmos Energy Corporation (ATO) (gas utilities)
- Avis Budget Group, Inc. (CAR) (rental & leasing services)
- Boeing Company (The) (BA) (aerospace & defense)
- Caterpillar Inc. (CAT) (farm & construction equipment)
- C.H. Robinson Worldwide, Inc. (CHRW) (air delivery & freight services)
- Chevron Corporation (CVX) (major integrated oil & gas)
- Cisco Systems, Inc. (CSCO) (computer networking)
- Coca-Cola Company (The) (KO) (beverages)
- Consolidated Edison, Inc. (ED) (diversified utilities)
- CSX Corp. (CSX) (railroads)
- Delta Air Lines, Inc. (DAL) (major airlines)
- Dominion Energy, Inc. (D) (electric utilities)
- Dow Inc. (DOW) (chemicals)
- Duke Energy Corp. (DUK) (electric utilities)
- Edison International (EIX) (electric utilities)
- Exelon Corp. (EXC) (diversified utilities)
- Expeditors International (EXPD) (air delivery & freight services)
- FedEx Corporation (FDX) (air delivery & freight services)
- FirstEnergy Corp. (FE) (electric utilities)
- Goldman Sachs Group, Inc. (The) (GS) (investment brokerage)
- Home Depot, Inc. (The) (HD) (home improvement stores)
- Honeywell International Inc. (HON) (conglomerates)
- Intel Corp. (INTC) (semiconductors)
- International Business Machines Corp. (IBM) (diversified computer systems)
- JB Hunt Transport Services, Inc. (JBHT) (trucking)
- JetBlue Airways Corp. (JBLU) (regional airlines)
- JPMorgan Chase and Co. (JPM) (money center banks)
- Johnson & Johnson Inc. (JNJ) (drug manufacturers)
- Kirby Corporation (KEX) (shipping)
- Landstar System, Inc. (LSTR) (trucking)
- Matson, Inc. (MATX) (shipping)
- McDonald's Corp. (MCD) (restaurants)
- Merck & Co., Inc. (MRK) (drug manufacturers)
- Microsoft Corp. (MSFT) (application software)
- NextEra Energy Inc. (NEE) (electric utilities)
- Nike, Inc. (NKE) (apparel, footwear & accessories)
- Norfolk Southern Corp. (NSC) (railroads)
- Old Dominion Freight Line, Inc. (ODFL) (trucking)
- Procter & Gamble Co. (PG) (cleaning products)
- Public Service Enterprise Group, Inc. (PEG) (diversified utilities)
- Ryder System, Inc. (R) (rental & leasing services)
- salesforce.com, inc. (CRM) (application software)
- Sempra Energy (SRE) (Multi-Utilities)
- Southern Company (The) (SO) (electric utilities)
- Southwest Airlines Co. (LUV) (regional airlines)
- Travelers Companies, Inc. (The) (TRV) (insurance)
- Union Pacific Corporation (UNP) (railroads)
- United Airlines Holdings (UAL) (major airlines)
- United Parcel Service, Inc. (UPS) (air delivery & freight services)
- UnitedHealth Group Inc. (UNH) (health care plans)
- Verizon Communications Inc. (VZ) (telecom services)
- Visa Inc. (V) (credit services)
- Walgreens Boots Alliance, Inc. (WBA) (retailing)
- Walmart Inc. (WMT) (discount, variety stores)
- Walt Disney Company (The) (DIS) (entertainment)
- Xcel Energy Inc. (XEL) (electric utilities)

(as of December 2021)

The Dow Jones Composite Average is primarily made up of large market capitalization stocks, with a few middle capitalization and small capitalization companies included. 45 of the 65 components of the average are traded on the New York Stock Exchange, with the 20 others being traded on the NASDAQ.
