= Bergstresser =

Bergstresser is a surname. Notable people with the surname include:

- Charles Bergstresser (1858–1923), American journalist and businessman
- Ethel Bergstresser McCoy (1893–1980), American philatelist
