= Maude Latour =

American singer-songwriter (born 1999)

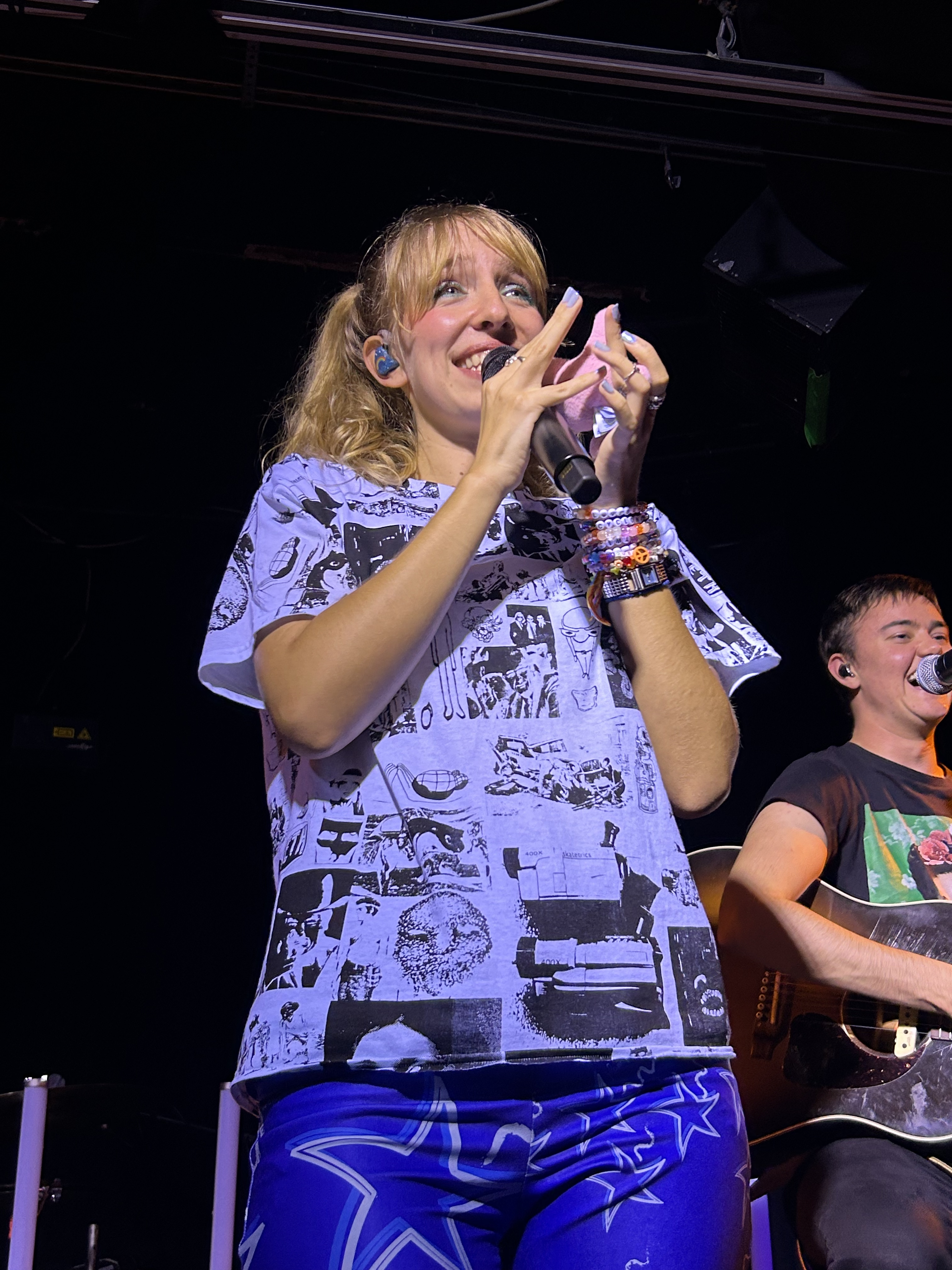
- Latour in 2023
- Born: Maude Latour; October 8, 1999 (age 26); Sweden
- Education: Columbia University
- Occupations: Singer; songwriter
- Years active: 2018–present
- Father: Almar Latour
- Musical career
- Label: Warner Records
- Website: maudelatour.com

Maude Latour (born October 8, 1999) is a Swedish-born American singer-songwriter.

== Early life and education ==
Latour was born in Sweden. Her father is Almar Latour, former executive editor and current publisher of The Wall Street Journal and CEO of Dow Jones & Company, and her mother is a journalist for S&P Global. She lived in New York City, London, and attended Hong Kong International School before attending the Brearley School in Manhattan. Latour graduated from Columbia University in 2022 as a philosophy major.

== Career ==
Latour began songwriting at 15 and uploading her music to Spotify at 17. She released her first EP, High School High, in 2018. It has since been taken off streaming platforms. She released her second EP, Starsick, in 2019, which includes songs such as “Superfruit”, “Shoot and Run”, and “Lovesick”. Latour wrote one of her most streamed songs "Shoot and Run" for a school project her senior year of high school.

Latour is currently signed to Warner Records. She released her breakout single, "One More Weekend" in July 2020 and it has amassed over 37 million streams on Spotify. Latour released her second EP Strangers Forever in October 2021 and in the spring of 2022 she headlined her first tour, performing in 13 cities across North America.

In 2022, Latour released singles "Headphones", "Lola", and "Trees". She performed at Lollapalooza in July 2022. Ahead of the festival, she released a new single, "Probabilities". In addition to headlining her "What is This Feeling?" tour, Latour performed at multiple music festivals in the fall, including Austin City Limits Music Festival, All Things Go Fall Classic, and Music Midtown.

On September 16, 2022, Latour shared on Instagram that she covered Kim Wilde's "Kids in America" for the 2022 Netflix film Do Revenge. Three days later, Latour announced her newest EP, 001, was to be released on September 30, 2022. On 001, 2 new songs were released, "001" and "Living It". On December 9, 2022, a new song "Reality television" was added to 001.

In 2023, Latour released singles "Heaven", "Lunch", and "I am not the sun", which were all included on EP Twin Flame released on June 9.

In 2024, Latour released "Too Slow", "Cursed Romantics", "Comedown", and "Whirlpool" in March, May, June, and August respectively. Her debut album, Sugar Water, was released on August 16, 2024. The album received positive reviews from major publications. Rolling Stone highlighted her as an "Artist You Need to Know" and praised the album's exploration of existential themes. PopMatters commended it for its lyrical depth and emotional resonance, while Earmilk described it as a dynamic and genre-blending project, stating that Latour "deserves infinite roses" for her innovative approach to pop music. She opened for the U.S. leg of Fletcher's In Search of the Antidote Tour in Fall 2024.

On April 25, 2025, Latour released the single "Miss America." She stated that falling in love and meeting queer people while touring the U.S. inspired the song and described it as "a manifesto of a future with no nation state."

In July 2025, Latour announced she will be opening for the second leg of Alex Warren's Cheaper Than Therapy Tour.

Latour released the single "TickTickBoom" on September 12, 2025. On September 26, she released the deluxe edition of Sugar Water, including previously released singles "Miss America" and "TickTickBoom" plus three new tracks.

== Personal life ==
Latour described herself as a "fluid bi girl" in 2022.

== Discography ==
=== Albums ===
Title	Album details
Sugar Water	Released: August 16, 2024; Format: LP, Digital download, streaming

=== EPs ===
Title	Details
High School High	Released: August 16, 2018
Starsick	Released: November 15, 2019
Strangers Forever	Released: October 29, 2021
001	Released: September 30, 2022
Twin Flame	Released: June 9, 2023

=== Singles ===
Title	Year	Album
"Furniture"	2020	Strangers Forever
"One More Weekend"	2020	Strangers Forever
"Block Your Number"	2020	Strangers Forever
"Walk Backwards"	2021	Strangers Forever
"Clean"	2021	Strangers Forever
"Headphones"	2022	001
"Lola"	2022	001
"Trees"	2022	001
"Probabilities"	2022	001
"Cyclone"	2022	001
"Kids in America (From the Netflix Film "Do Revenge")"	2022	Non-album single
"Heaven"	2023	Twin Flame
"Lunch"	2023	Twin Flame
"I am not the sun"	2023	Twin Flame
"Too Slow"	2024	Sugar Water
"Cursed Romantics"	2024	Sugar Water
"Comedown"	2024	Sugar Water
"Whirlpool"	2024	Sugar Water
"Miss America"	2025	Sugar Water (Deluxe)
"TickTickBoom"	2025	Sugar Water (Deluxe)

== Tours ==
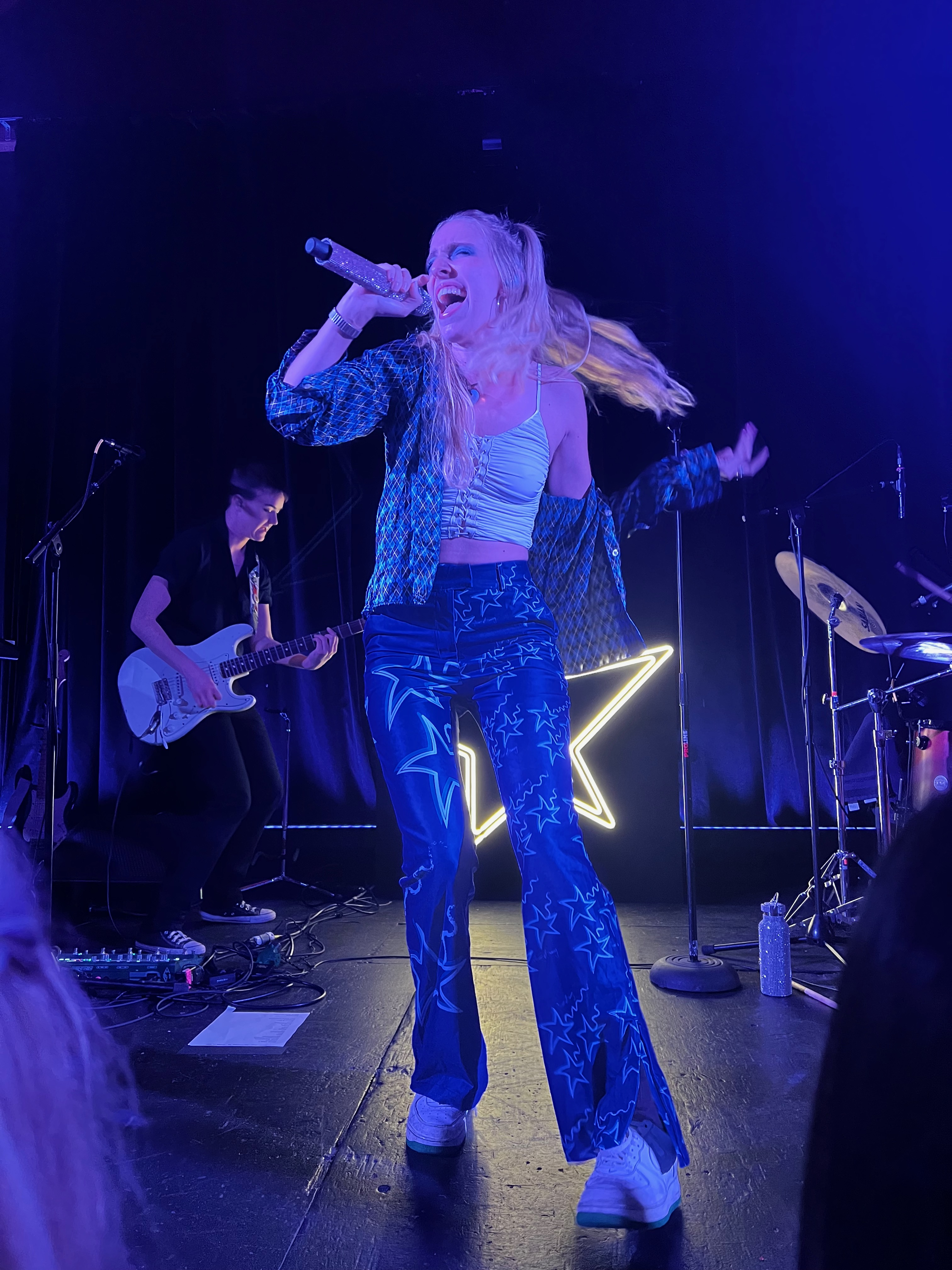
Latour in 2022 on tour

=== Headlining ===
- Spring 2022 Tour (2022)
- What Is This Feeling? Tour (2022)
- Twin Flame Tour (2023)
- The Sugar Water Tour (2025)

=== Opening act ===
- Fletcher – In Search of the Antidote Tour (2024)
- Alex Warren – Cheaper Than Therapy Tour (2025)
- Peach PRC – Wondering Spirit Tour (2026)
