= Almar Latour =

American businessman

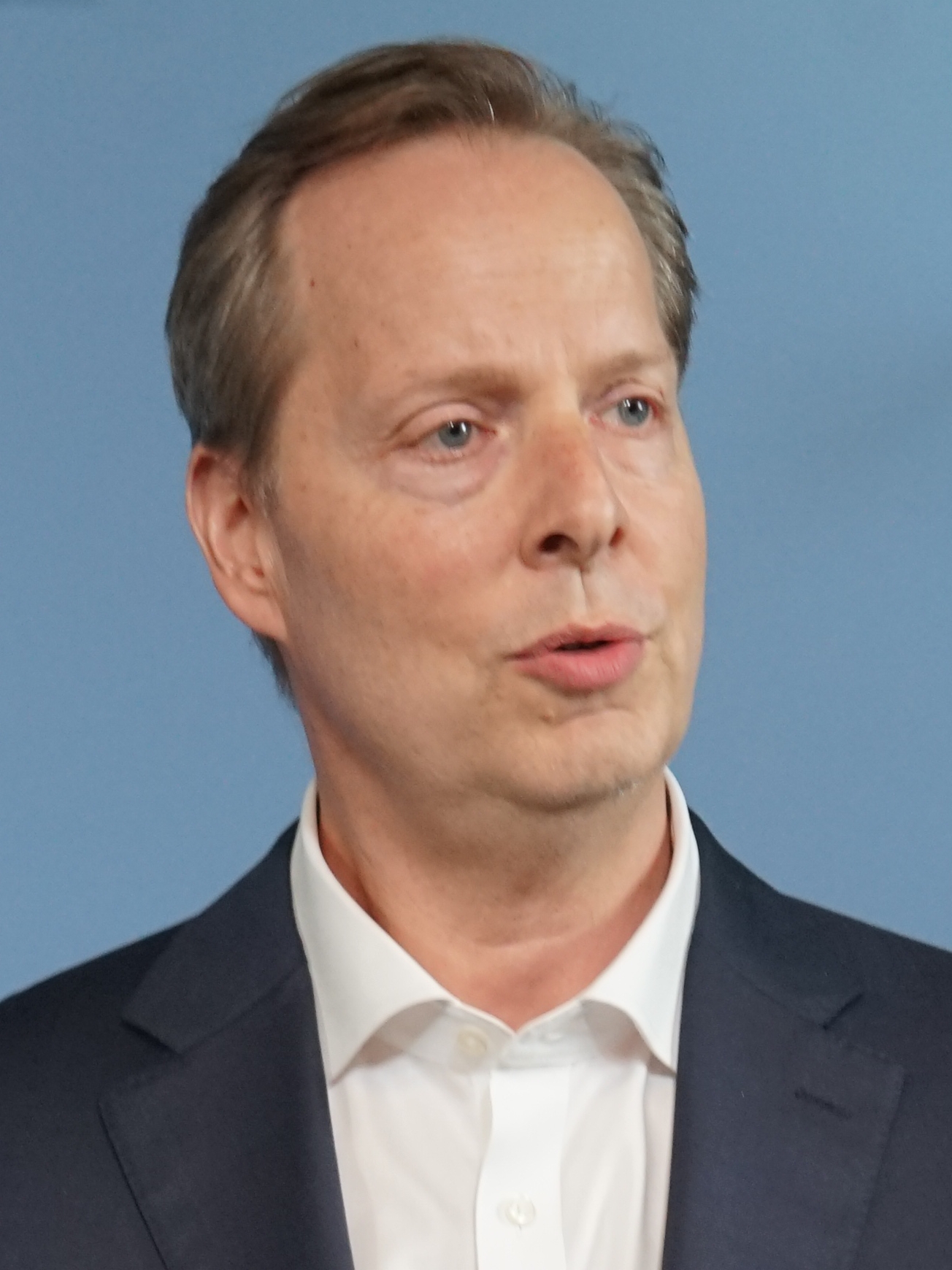
- Latour in 2025
- Born: 1971; Welten, Netherlands
- Education: Indiana University of Pennsylvania (BA); American University (MA)
- Occupations: CEO, Dow Jones and Company
- Employer: News Corp
- Spouse: Abby
- Children: 2, including Maude
- Website: www.dowjones.com/team/almar-latour/

Almar Latour is a media executive and current CEO of Dow Jones and Company.

== Early life and education ==
Latour grew up in Welten in the Netherlands. During his childhood education, he studied German, English, Dutch, and French.

Through the Fulbright Program, Latour came to the United States in 1990, where he attended Indiana University of Pennsylvania in Indiana, Pennsylvania, where he graduated with Bachelor of Arts degrees in journalism and political science. While there, he worked as a features editor for The Penn, the university's student newspaper. He then earned a master's degree from American University in Washington, D.C.

In May 2025, Latour received an honorary doctorate from American University.

== Career ==
Latour began his career as a reporter for a newspaper at a Chautauqua, New York resort and interning at The Washington Times and The Wall Street Journal, where he authored a front-page article for The Wall Street Journal Europe.

In 1995, Latour was hired as a news assistant in the Washington, D.C. bureau of The Wall Street Journal. He later was assigned to the newspaper's London bureau and then to the newspaper's New York City headquarters, where he joined, and later led The Wall Street Journal's technology team. Latour helped lead the transformation and redesign of the newspaper's online presence, which helped it reach one million digital subscribers.

In 2012, Latour became the executive editor of The Wall Street Journal, Dow Jones, and MarketWatch.

In 2016, Latour was appointed editor and publisher of the newly formed Dow Jones Media Group, later renamed Barron's Group. As publisher he set ambitious goals for each brand. Between 2016 and 2019, Barron's grew its subscriber base by 125% to 299,000 subscribers.

=== Dow Jones CEO ===
On May 4, 2020, Dow Jones announced Latour would replace William Lewis as CEO. He assumed the role on May 15, 2020.

On July 21, 2020, more than 280 Journal journalists and Dow Jones staff members wrote a letter to Latour criticizing the opinion pages' "lack of fact-checking and transparency, and its apparent disregard for evidence," adding, "opinion articles often make assertions that are contradicted by WSJ reporting." The letter cited a June 2020 opinion article by the U.S. vice president Mike Pence that contained errors, asserting that "scrutinizing these numbers would have required no more than a Google search."

Latour is reported to have had a strained relationship with Matt Murray, a former editor in chief of The Wall Street Journal, a Dow Jones publication.

== Personal life ==
Latour met his wife Abby, a journalist, in Stockholm. They live in New York City with their two daughters, one of whom is Maude Latour, a singer-songwriter.
