= Dow Jones & Company =

American publishing and financial information company

Dow Jones & Company, Inc.
- Type: Subsidiary
- Traded as: NYSE: DJ (until 2007); S&P 500 component (until 2007)
- Industry: Publishing
- Founded: November 1882; 144 years ago
- Founders: Charles Dow; Edward Jones; Charles Bergstresser
- Headquarters: 1211 Avenue of the Americas, New York City, United States
- Key people: Almar Latour (CEO)
- Products: The Wall Street Journal; Barron's; Market Watch; Financial News; (Full list)
- Revenue: ▲$1.5 billion USD (2019)
- Net income: ▲$386.56 million USD (2009)
- Parent: News Corp (2007–2013; 2013–present)
- Website: dowjones.com

Dow Jones & Company, Inc. (also known simply as Dow Jones) is an American publishing firm owned by News Corp, and led by CEO Almar Latour. The company publishes The Wall Street Journal, Barron's, MarketWatch, Mansion Global, Financial News and Private Equity News.

The company is best known for its historical publication of the Dow Jones Industrial Average (DJIA) and related market statistics. It published the DJIA from 1882 until 2010, when News Corp then sold 90% ownership of the Dow Jones stock market indices business to CME Group; News Corp sold CME its remaining 10% in 2013.

== History ==
The company was founded in 1882 by three reporters: Charles Dow, Edward Jones, and Charles Bergstresser. Charles Dow was widely known for his ability to break down and convey what was often considered very convoluted financial information and news to the general public – this is one of the reasons why Dow Jones & Company is well known for their publications and transferring of important and sometimes difficult to understand financial information to people across the globe. Nevertheless, the three reporters were joined in control of the organization by Thomas F. Woodlock.

Dow Jones was acquired in 1902 by Clarence Barron, the leading financial journalist of the day, after the death of co-founder Charles Dow. Upon Barron's death in 1928, control of the company passed to his stepdaughter, Jane Bancroft. The company was led by the Bancroft family, which effectively controlled 64% of all voting stock, until 2007 when an extended takeover battle saw News Corporation acquire the business. The company then became a subsidiary of News Corporation. It was reported on August 1, 2007, that the bid had been successful after an extended period of uncertainty about shareholder agreement, with the transaction finalized on December 13, 2007. It was worth US$5 billion or $60 a share, giving News Corp control of The Wall Street Journal and ending the Bancroft family's 105 years of ownership.

Dow Jones was the original publisher of the Dow Jones Industrial Average, in addition to a number of other financial statistics and publications. In 2010, the Dow Jones Indexes subsidiary was sold to the CME Group and the company focused on financial news publications, including its flagship publication The Wall Street Journal and providing financial news and information tools to financial companies.

In 2005, together with FTSE, Dow Jones launched the Industry Classification Benchmark, a taxonomy used to segregate markets into sectors.

In April 2020, Dow Jones CEO William Lewis announced he would be stepping down from his position after nearly six years in the role.

On May 7, 2020 News Corp announced that Almar Latour would assume the CEO role on May 15, 2020.

In 2021, Dow Jones acquired OPIS and Base Chemicals from IHS Markit for $1.4 billion dollars.

== Products ==
=== Consumer media ===
Its flagship publication, The Wall Street Journal, is a daily newspaper in print and online covering business, financial national and international news and issues around the globe. It began publishing on July 8, 1889. There are 12 versions of the Journal in nine languages, including English, Chinese, Japanese, German, Spanish, Portuguese, Malay, Turkish and Korean. The Journal has won 35 Pulitzer Prizes for outstanding journalism.

Other consumer-oriented publications of Dow Jones include Barron's Magazine, a weekly overview of the world economy and markets, MarketWatch, an online financial news site, and Investor's Business Daily, a newspaper and website covering the stock market, international business, finance and economics. Financial News provides news on investment banking, securities, and asset management. BigCharts, provided by MarketWatch's Virtual Stock Exchange Games, includes stock charts, screeners, interactive charting, and research tools. Professor Journal is a "Journal" in education program for professors to integrate into curriculum.

In 2017, Dow Jones launched Moneyish, a lifestyle and personal finance website aimed at millennial readers.

Dow Jones also published Heat Street, an online news and opinion website launched in February 2016 that was later folded into MarketWatch.

The monthly journal Far Eastern Economic Review closed in September 2009.

=== Enterprise media ===
Dow Jones serves corporate markets and financial markets clients with financial news and information products and services. Dow Jones owns more than 20 products that combine content and technology to help drive decisions, which include:

- Dow Jones Newswires;
- Dow Jones Factiva, a database that provides a curated basis for making decisions through search results, alerts, newsletters, and charts about companies, topics, and people;
- Dow Jones FX Select, delivers real-time, breaking global FX news, expert trend analysis and in-depth policy commentary in 13 languages;
- Dow Jones VentureSource, provides data on venture-backed companies and helps find deal and partnership opportunities, perform comprehensive due diligence and examine trends in venture capital investment, fund-raising and liquidity;
- Private Equity Analyst, timely news and critical analysis of private equity and venture capital activity, offering insight and breaking news on developments in fund-raising, investment, deal finance, liquidity, returns, and executive moves;
- Dow Jones Risk & Compliance, on risk management, regulatory compliance or corporate governance content for Anti-Corruption, Anti-Money Laundering, and Payments and Sanctions.

=== Dow Jones Newswires ===
Dow Jones Newswires is the real-time financial news organization founded in 1882, its primary competitors are Bloomberg L.P. and Thomson Reuters. The company reports more than 600,000 subscribers – including brokers, traders, analysts, world leaders, and finance officials and fund managers – as of July 2011.

=== Ventures ===
In 2009 Dow Jones Ventures launched FINS.com, a standalone resource for financial professionals with information about finance careers and the finance industry. In 2012, the site was acquired by Dice.com.

In 2017, Dow Jones announced the beta launch of DNA (Data, News and Analytics), a platform designed to allow businesses to integrate the company's news and data into their own applications.

=== Broadcasting ===
In broadcasting, Dow Jones provides news content to CNBC in the U.S. It produced two shows for commercial radio, The Wall Street Journal Report on the Wall Street Journal Radio Network and The Dow Jones Report. The network was shut down in 2014.

Dow Jones also launched WSJ Live an interactive video website that provides live and on demand videos from The Wall Street Journal Video Network. Programs included "News Hub", "MoneyBeat", and "Lunch Break" among others. WSJ Live was shut down in 2017.

=== Indices ===
In February 2010, Dow Jones sold a 90% stake in its Index business for $607.5 million to Chicago-based CME Group, which owns the Chicago Mercantile Exchange. A few of the most widely used included:

- Dow Jones Industrial Average (DJIA, "Dow 30", or often simply "The Dow")
- Dow Jones Transportation Average
- Dow Jones Utility Average
- Dow Jones Composite Average
- The Global Dow
- Dow Jones Global Titans 50 Index
- Dow Jones Total Stock Market Index
- Dow Jones Sustainability Indexes
- Dow Jones-UBS Commodity Indexes
- Dow Jones Target Date Indexes

In July 2012, Dow Jones & Company and CME Group contributed the Dow Jones Indices to the formation of the S&P Dow Jones Indices joint venture, with McGraw–Hill's Standard and Poor's (S&P) subsidiary holding 73.0%, the CME Group holding 24.4%, and Dow Jones & Company holding an indirect 2.6% ownership interest in the joint venture.

In April 2013, CME Group purchased the Dow Jones & Company interest in the S&P Dow Jones Indices joint venture for $80.0 million, increasing CME Group's interest to 27.0% and removing Dow Jones & Company from all involvement with its namesake indices.

=== NewsPicks USA ===
In March 2017, Dow Jones and NewsPicks Inc., a Japanese firm that develops and operates a business news platform of the same name, established a joint venture called NewsPicks USA, LLC. The joint venture is headed by CEO Ken Breen, who is currently the Senior Vice President, Commercial, for the Dow Jones Media Group, together with Chairman Yusuke Umeda, who is also the Director of NewsPicks Inc.

The joint venture launched the English version of the NewsPicks platform for the US market on November 13, 2017. Similar to the original Japanese edition, the US edition of NewsPicks combines business news from sources like The Wall Street Journal, Bloomberg, and Reuters with social networking features, such as comments on news articles from top-ranked business professionals from around the world ("ProPickers"). The platform currently has a smartphone app for the iPhone with plans for release on Android in the future.

The venture was dissolved in October 2018 with the Japanese parent company retaining full ownership.

== Ownership ==
The company's foundation was laid by Charles Dow, Edward Jones and Charles Bergstresser who, over two decades, conceived and promoted the three products which define Dow Jones and financial journalism: The Wall Street Journal, Dow Jones Newswires and the Dow Jones Industrial Average.

Dow Jones was acquired in 1902 by the leading financial journalist of the day, Clarence Barron.

In 2007, Dow Jones was acquired by News Corp., a leading global media company.

The Bancroft family and heirs of Clarence W. Barron effectively controlled the company's class B shares, each with a voting power of ten regular shares, prior to its sale to News Corp. At one time, they controlled 64% of Dow Jones voting stock.

Currently, Dow Jones is owned by Rupert Murdoch, owner of News Corp and several other major media companies.

=== Buyout offer ===
On May 1, 2007, Dow Jones released a statement confirming that News Corporation, led by Rupert Murdoch, had made an unsolicited offer of $60 per share, or $5 billion, for Dow Jones. Stock was briefly halted for a pending press release. The halt lasted under 10 minutes while CNBC was receiving data. It was suggested that the buyout offer was related to Murdoch's new cable business news channel Fox Business, which launched in 2007, and that the Dow Jones brand would bring instant credibility to the project.

On June 6, 2007, Brian Tierney, CEO and founder of Philadelphia Media Holdings, which then owned The Philadelphia Inquirer, Philadelphia Daily News and Philly.com, went public in an article on Philly.com expressing interest in "joining with outside partners to buy Dow Jones." Tierney said, "We would participate as Philadelphia Media Holdings, along with other investors. We wouldn't do it alone."

In June, MySpace co-founder Brad Greenspan put forth a bid to buy 25% of Dow Jones for $60 a share, the same price per share as News Corporation's bid, giving the existing shareholders a $1.25 billion cash infusion while maintaining overall ownership of the company.

On July 17, 2007, The Wall Street Journal, a unit of Dow Jones, reported that the company and News Corporation had agreed in principle on a US$5 billion takeover, that the offer would be put to the full Dow Jones board on the same evening in New York, and that the offer valued the company at 70% more than the company's market value.

Our strategy centers around leaving the print publications of Dow Jones intact to continue serving as the gold standard of financial reporting, and creating additional earnings streams through digital media initiatives that can produce a stock price above 100 dollars a share,

For too long, Dow Jones has limited its focus to the world of print media and allowed other, less established entities to generate millions of dollars in profits by developing financial reporting franchises on the Internet and cable television.

The time has come for Dow Jones to break out of its slumber and extend its dominance into the lucrative arena of digital media.

— Channel News Asia Business Section

==== Insider trading scandal ====
Upon investigating suspicious share price movements in the run-up to the announcement, the United States Securities and Exchange Commission alleged that board member Sir David Li, one of Hong Kong's most prominent businessmen, had informed his close friend and business associate Michael Leung of the impending offer. Leung acted on this information by telling his daughter and son-in-law, who reaped a US$8.2 million profit from an insider trading transaction.

== Corporate governance ==
Prior to its sale to News Corp, the last members of the board of directors of the company were Christopher Bancroft, Lewis B. Campbell, Michael Elefante, John Engler, Harvey Golub, Leslie Hill, Irvine Hockaday, Peter Kann, David Li, M. Peter McPherson (chairman), Frank Newman, James Ottaway, Elizabeth Steele, and William Steere.

== See also ==
- Closing milestones of the Dow Jones Industrial Average
- List of assets owned by Dow Jones
