= Business journalism =

Branch of journalism

Business journalism is the part of journalism that tracks, records, analyzes, and interprets the business, economic and financial activities and changes that take place in societies. Topics widely cover the entire purview of all commercial activities related to the economy.

This area of journalism provides news and feature articles about people, places, and issues related to the business sector. Newspapers, magazines, radio, and television-news shows can include a business segment. Detailed and in-depth business journalism may appear in publications, radio, and television channels dedicated specifically to business and financial journalism.

== History ==
Business journalism began as early as the Middle Ages, to help well-known trading families communicate with each other. In the fifteenth and sixteenth centuries, one of the first business papers was Neus Zeitungen of the House of Fugger, which was well read by merchants. Around 1700, Daniel Defoe, best known for his novels, especially Robinson Crusoe, began publishing business and economic news. By 1740-1760, business press could be found in most economies, particularly in Europe, but also in places such as China, South Africa and Argentina. By 1845, Britain had 24 business newspapers.

In 1869, John J. Kiernan launched his Wall Street Financial News Bureau, which used a combination of physical news gathering and electric powered news dissemination, for stockbrokers. He trained and employed Charles Dow, Edward Jones and Charles Bergstresser, who in 1882, began a wire service that delivered news to investment houses along Wall Street. In January 1888, the London Financial Guide was launched and renamed the Financial Times a month later. In 1889, The Wall Street Journal began publishing.

While the famous muckraking journalist Ida Tarbell did not consider herself to be a business reporter, her reporting and writing about the Standard Oil Co. in 1902 provided the template for how thousands of business journalists have covered companies ever since.

The globalization of commerce since the late 20th century has made financial and business journalism more important, whilst defined benefit retirement accounts and mass market investment opportunities, have increased the number of people that are impacted by changes in the financial markets, increasing business journalisms readership and importance. Business coverage gained further prominence in the 1990s, with wider investment in the stock market.

The Wall Street Journal is a prominent example of business journalism and is among the United States of America's top newspapers in terms of both circulation and respect for the journalists who write for the publication. In 2022, an IPSOS survey named the Financial Times as the leading business publication in Europe.

== Personnel ==
Journalists who work in this area are classed as "business journalists". Their main task is to gather information about current events as they relate to business. They may also cover processes, trends, consequences, and important people in business and they disseminate their work through all types of mass media. There are different types of business journalists, including Financial, Economic, Corporate, and Trade journalists.

It is anticipated that there will be a 3% decline in employment for news analysts, journalists and reporters between 2022 and 2032. The skills required for business journalism can be used for business to business trade press.

== Industrial and developing countries ==
Business journalism, although common in most industrialized countries, has a limited role in third-world and developing countries. This leaves citizens of such countries less able to increase their knowledge of business current affairs. Efforts to bring business media to these countries have proven to be worthwhile.

== See also ==
- List of business newspapers
- Gerald Loeb Award
- Trade magazine
