= Comparative bullet-lead analysis =

Former forensic technique

Comparative bullet-lead analysis (CBLA), also known as compositional bullet-lead analysis, is a now discredited and abandoned forensic technique which used chemistry to link crime scene bullets to ones possessed by suspects on the theory that each batch of lead had a unique elemental makeup.

The technique was first used after U.S. President John F. Kennedy's assassination in 1963. From the early 1980s through 2004 the US Federal Bureau of Investigation conducted about 2,500 analyses on cases submitted by law-enforcement groups. The results of these analyses had often been questioned by defence lawyers and the press, so the FBI finally asked the United States National Academy of Sciences' Board on Science, Technology, and Economic Policy to research the scientific merit of the process.

In 2004 the Board's study was summarized in "Forensic Analysis: Weighing Bullet Lead Evidence." The Board determined that the chemical analyses were being performed correctly and were probably sufficient to determine correlation between two bullets from separate sources (the analysis used plasma-optical emission spectroscopy to identify trace elements in the bullets). The report also concluded that the seven trace elements selected for the analyses (arsenic, antimony, tin, copper, bismuth, silver and cadmium) are acceptable for sample correlation. The report finally concluded that the procedure is the best available method for such correlations. The greatest caveat in the report was that the statistical tests as applied by the FBI could cause confusion and misinterpretation when transmitted to prosecutors or when explained to a trial jury. Because of the significance of this weakness, the report concluded that the analysis should be used with caution. This report helped the FBI decide in 2004 to voluntarily cease offering the analysis to law-enforcement entities. The National Academy of Sciences never required that the FBI stop using the test.

CNN Presents Encore Presentation: Reasonable Doubt examined the unreliability of this technique. It has been discontinued as of September 1, 2005.

The U.S. government has fought releasing the list of the estimated 2,500 cases over three decades in which it performed the analysis, which may have led to false convictions. According to the FBI, only 20% of the 2,500 tests performed introduced the CBLA results into evidence at trial.

On 17 December 2008, Jimmy Ates was released from a Florida prison after serving ten years on the conviction of having murdered his wife, a conviction obtained largely on the strength of a bullet-lead analysis. His conviction was overturned as a consequence of the 2004 report.
