= Thom Calandra =

- Born: June 8, 1956 (age 68); Brooklyn, New York, United States
- Education: University of Arizona, City University of New York at Brooklyn College
- Occupation(s): Financial journalist, stock investor
- Spouse: Maura Thurman
- Children: 2

Thom Calandra (born June 8, 1956, in Brooklyn, New York) is an American journalist, stock investor, and the former editor-in-chief and chief commentator for CBS MarketWatch from 1996 to January 2004, until his investigation by the U.S. Securities and Exchange Commission. Calandra writes for a number of other publications including the revived The Calandra Report.

== Early life and career ==
Calandra studied English and journalism at the University of Arizona and English literature from City University of New York at Brooklyn College.

Calandra was a financial columnist for The San Francisco Examiner and a London-based editor and columnist for Bloomberg News in Europe. He was also the online financial editor of USAToday.com, and has contributed to a number of other publications.

In 1996, he co-founded MarketWatch, formerly known as DBC News, and served as the founding editor-in-chief. He moved to London in April 2000 and began a joint venture with the Financial Times called FTMarketWatch. In 2001 the venture folded into the Financial Times and he returned to San Francisco to serve as the chief commentator for CBS MarketWatch. In March 2003 he started the newsletter 'The Calandra Report' that would focus mostly on his own stock recommendations.

== MarketWatch resignation and SEC investigation ==
In January 2004, Calandra resigned from MarketWatch and was subject to an informal regulatory inquiry. On January 10, 2005, the U.S. Securities and Exchange Commission filed a case against him in the United States District Court for the Northern District of California. The case involved civil fraud charges citing an illegal trading scheme, a "buy-write-sell" pattern involving 23 different stocks, and was also settled at the time of filing. Calandra paid US$416,109.58 in disgorgement of illegal trading profits and a civil penalty of US$125,000. Calandra's settlement with the SEC did not include an admission or denial of the allegations and agreed to a "permanent injunction from further violations of the antifraud provisions of the federal securities laws". In a 2011 interview with Karen Roche of The Gold Report, Calandra apologized for his actions stating it was "no excuse for a trained journalist" and " I acknowledge my errors from back then".

== Post MarketWatch career ==
In 2008, Stockhouse announced the launch of 'Ticker Trax By Thom Calandra' in a press release. Calandra stated he writes for BabyBulls.com and Beforeitsnews.com as well as a principal at Torrey Hills Capital. On August 11, 2012, Calandra announced the resumption of The Calandra Report via Twitter.
