= Private Equity News =

Europe-based business magazine

- Type: Monthly magazine
- Owner: Dow Jones & Company
- Editor: Mark Latham
- Founded: 2003
- Language: English
- Headquarters: London
- Website: penews.com

Private Equity News is a Europe-based business magazine about the private equity industry. It is part of media organisation Dow Jones & Co, itself part of News Corp, and is a sister title to Financial News, Private Equity Analyst and The Wall Street Journal.

The magazine and its website have been running since 2003 and hold various events. In 2022 the title relaunched as a monthly magazine, where previously it had been published weekly.
