= Suzanne Scotchmer =

American economist (1950–2014)

Suzanne Scotchmer (January 23, 1950 – January 30, 2014) was an American professor of law, economics and public policy at the University of California, Berkeley, and a noted author on many economic subjects. She earned her B.A. from University of Washington magna cum laude in 1970, her M.A. in statistics from UC Berkeley in 1979, and her PhD in economics from UC Berkeley in 1980.

== Biography ==
Scotchmer was raised in Pelican, Alaska, where her grandparents homesteaded after failing as gold rushers.

Scotchmer held visiting and teaching positions at Harvard University, University of Auckland, Cergy-Pontoise University, Tel Aviv University, Pantheon-Sorbonne University, the University of Toronto Law School, University of Southern California, New School of Economics, Moscow, and the Stockholm School of Economics. She also has held research fellowships at Yale University and Stanford University. She also served on editorial boards of American Economic Review, Journal of Economic Literature, Journal of Economic Perspectives, Regional Science and Urban Economics, and the Journal of Public Economics. Scotchmer served on various committees of the National Research Council and was a member of the Board on Science, Technology, and Economic Policy. The Department of Justice used her as a consultant on antitrust. She was a fellow of the Econometrics Society.

She was most renowned for her contributions on economic literature on subjects ranging from intellectual property and innovation to game theory. She was considered one of the leading and most prominent experts on patent law and incentives for R&D and game theory. Her pieces were cited several times on work in the subject. She served as a scholar in residence at the US appellate court and has been called to testify as an expert in patent matters.

In 2017 The Econometric Society published a book recalling her life and work with a collection of 11 of her best-known papers.

== Death ==
Scotchmer died on January 30, 2014, one week after her 64th birthday, following a brief bout with intestinal cancer.

== Research ==
- Picking Winners in Rounds of Elimination; 2012
- Ideas and Innovations: Which Should Be Subsidized?; 2011
- Verifiability and Group Formation in Markets; 2010
- Risk Taking and Gender in Hierarchies; 2010
- Cap-and-Trade, Emissions Taxes, and Innovation; 2010
- Openness, Open Source, and the Veil of Ignorance; 2010
- Scarcity of Ideas and R&D Options: Use it, Lose it or Bank it; 2009
- Profit Neutrality in Licensing: The Boundary Between Antitrust Law and Patent Law; 2008
- Digital Rights Management and the Pricing of Digital Products; 2006
- Still Looking for Lost Profits: The Case of Horizontal Competition; 2006
- Open Source Software: The New Intellectual Property Paradigm; 2006
- Innovation and Incentives (book); 2004.
- Intellectual Property; 2005
- The Political Economy of Intellectual Property Treaties; 2004
- Procuring Knowledge; 2003
- The Core and Hedonic Core: Reply to Wooders (2001), with Counterexamples; 2003
- Damages and Injunctions in the Protection of Proprietary Research Tools; 2000
- The Independent-Invention Defense in Intellectual Property; 1999
- On the Optimality of the Patent Renewal System; 1999
- Patent Breadth, Patent Life, and the Pace of Technological Progress; 1999
- Protecting Early Innovators: Should Second-Generation Products be Patentable?; 1998
