= The European (2008 magazine) =

London-based business and lifestyle magazine

- Categories: Business, Finance, Technology
- Frequency: Quarterly
- First issue: 2008
- Company: Chase Publishing
- Country: United Kingdom
- Based in: London
- Language: English
- Website: the-european.eu

The European is a quarterly business and lifestyle magazine based in London, England. Founded in 2008, the publication targets C-suite executives and high-net-worth individuals, covering topics such as global banking, technology, foreign direct investment, and luxury travel.

== Content and Scope ==
The magazine focuses on global markets and emerging trends in the corporate world. Its editorial content is divided into several primary sectors:

- Finance and Banking: Analysis of international banking trends, fintech, and investment strategies.
- Technology: Coverage of digital transformation, AI, and cybersecurity within the business sector.
- FDI (Foreign Direct Investment): Reports on regional economic growth and investment opportunities in various countries.
- Lifestyle: High-end travel, automotive, and luxury goods aimed at the business elite.

== The European Business Awards ==
The magazine is well-known for hosting "The European Business Awards," a program that recognizes achievement across several industries including banking, aviation, and technology. The awards are typically divided by region (e.g., Western Europe, Middle East, Africa) and industry excellence. Notable past winners often include major international banks and telecommunications companies.

== Distribution ==
The European is distributed in both digital and print formats. Its print distribution is primarily targeted toward business hubs, including executive airport lounges, financial districts, and international conferences like the World Economic Forum.

== See also ==
- The Economist
- Financial Times
- Business journalism
