= Sabine Transportation Company =

Former US shipping company

- Industry: Shipping
- Founded: 1908 in Port Arthur, Texas, United States
- Defunct: 2005
- Parent: Kirby Corporation (1992 to 1998); Stickle Enterprise (1998-2005)

Sabine Transportation Company (STC) was a shipping company with headquarters in Cedar Rapids, Iowa. It shipped products worldwide.

STC shipped goods for relief efforts to Afghanistan, India, North Korea, Russia, and Africa. STC's tanker fleet transports, gasoline, and MTBE. STC ships were staffed with crews of about 25. STC was active on the Mississippi river, Missouri river, and Gulf of Mexico. STC also operated a fleet of tugboats and barges on American rivers. In 1967 STC merged with Chromalloy American Corp. Sequa Corp. purchased Chromalloy in 1982. In 1992 Sabine was purchased by Kirby Corporation. In 1998 STC was purchased by Stickle Enterprise. Sabine Transportation Company became the company name. The fleet of ships became aged and were retired by 2005. Stickle Enterprises is no longer in the shipping industry.

== History ==
Sabine Transportation Company was founded in 1908 in Port Arthur, Texas. In 1998 STC was purchased by Stickle Enterprises in Cedar Rapids. STC operates dry bulk and tanker ships. It has United States contracts with United States Agency for International Development.

== Ships ==
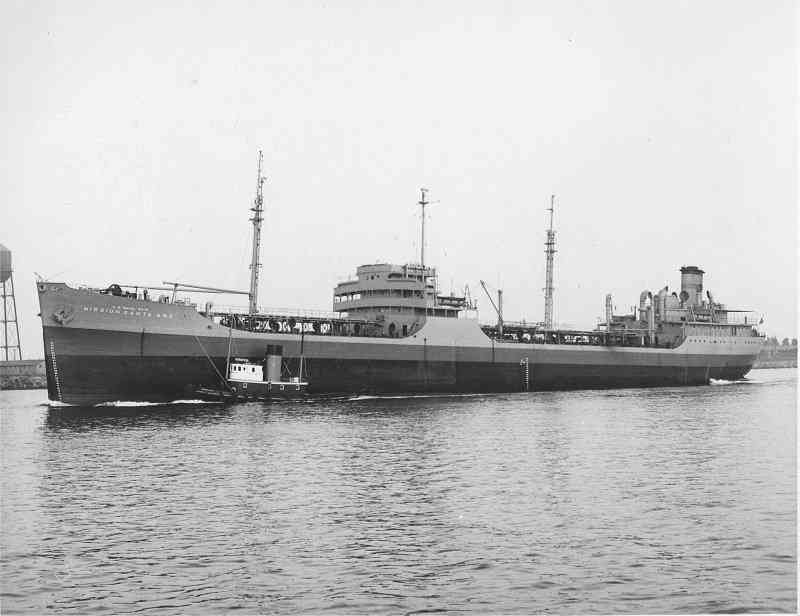
USNS Mission Santa Ana a T2 Tanker getting underway in Long Beach, California

- Some Sabine Transportation Company ships type Type T2 tankers:
- Trinity Built in 1944, a T2 tanker purchased 1958 (was Battle Mountain)
- Concho Built in 1944, a T2 tanker purchased 1979 (was Bradford Island)
- R. P. Smith Built in 1944, a T2 tanker purchased 1947 (was Edge Hilld)
- Neches Built in 1944, a T2 tanker purchased 1947 (was Fisher's Hill )
- Red River Built in 1945, a T2 tanker purchased 1978 (was Fort Hoskins)
- Neches] (2) Built in 1945, a T2 tanker purchased 1947 (was Murfreesboro )
- San Jacinto (2)] Built in 1944, a T2 tanker purchased 1975 (was Prairie Grove )
- Brazos Built in 1945, a T2 tanker purchased 1955 (was Santa Paula)
- Henry M. Dawes. Built in 1945, a T2 tanker purchased 1948 (was Signal Hill )
- Colorado Built in 1944, a T2 tanker purchased 1966 (was Tillamook)
- Llano Built in 1944, a T2 tanker purchased 1978 (was Tullahoma)
- Frio (was Cantigny)
  - Liberty Ship:
- Walther Du Mont (was Jean Baptiste Le Moyne),

== World War II ==
Sabine Transportation Company was a major tanker operator with a fleet of over 20 tankers during World War II for the War Shipping Administration. Keystone Shipping Company operated Type T2 tankers and other tankers. Sabine Transportation Company had a merchant crew of about 9 officers and 39 men.

== See also ==
- World War II United States Merchant Navy
