= David Morgenthaler =

American businessman

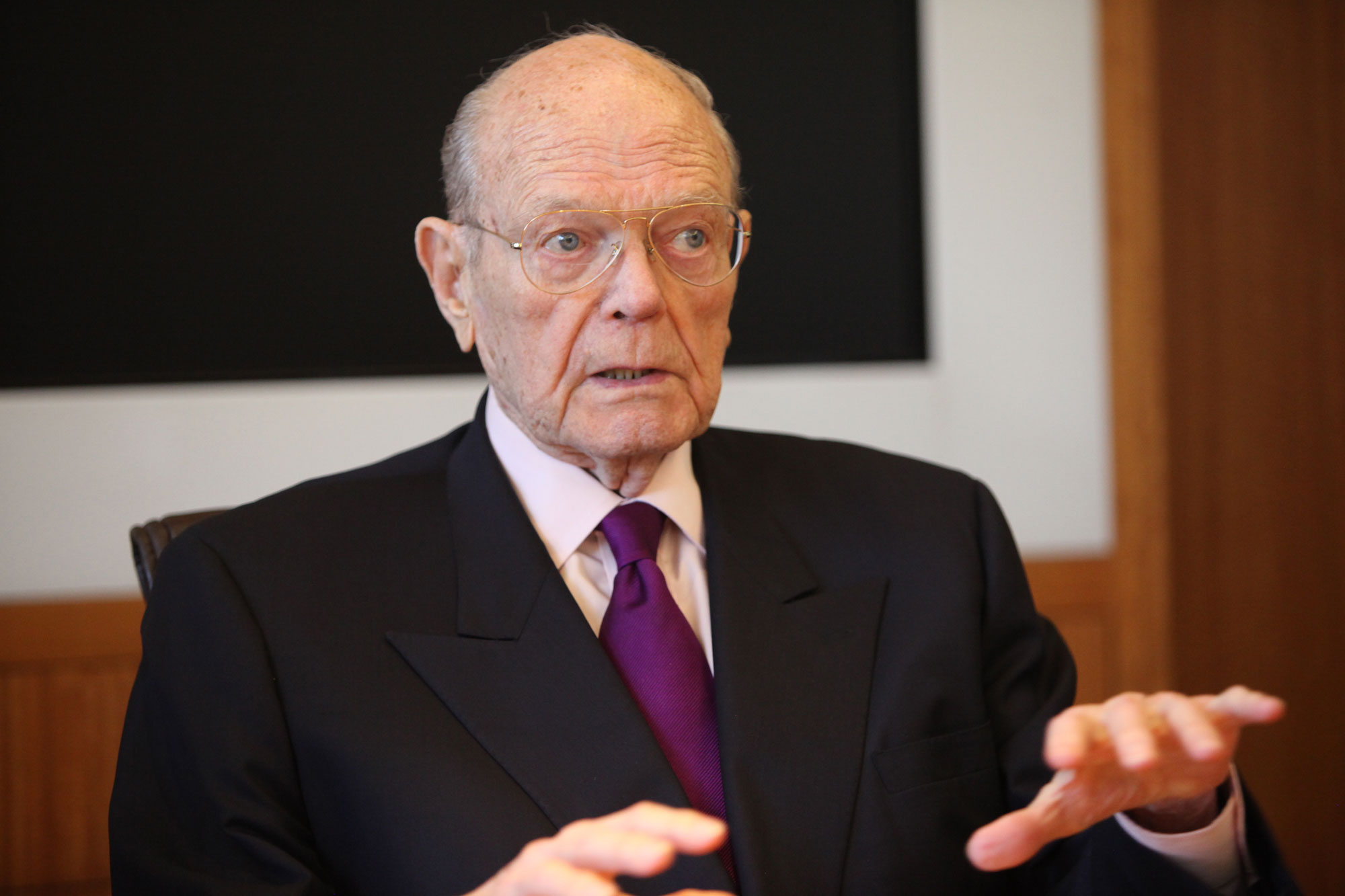
- David Morgenthaler in 2013
- Born: David Turner Morgenthaler; August 5, 1919; Chester, South Carolina
- Died: June 17, 2016 (aged 96); Cleveland, Ohio
- Education: Massachusetts Institute of Technology
- Occupation: Venture capitalist
- Known for: Founder of Morgenthaler Ventures
- Spouse: Lindsay Jordan Morgenthaler
- Children: 4
- Website: Profile at Morgenthaler Ventures

David Turner Morgenthaler (August 5, 1919 – June 17, 2016) was an American businessman who founded the venture capital firm Morgenthaler Ventures. He was also instrumental in helping change the U.S. capital gains tax rate from 49% to 28% in 1978 and amending ERISA legislation to allow pension funds to invest in venture capital in 1979.

== Biography ==
David Morgenthaler was born on August 5, 1919, in Chester, South Carolina. He was raised by his maiden aunt, who died when he was twelve years old. Morgenthaler received an S.B. and S.M. in Mechanical Engineering from Massachusetts Institute of Technology (MIT) in 1941. While attending MIT, he was elected Vice President—and later became President—of the Senior Class. He was also President of Sigma Nu fraternity and Captain of the M.I.T. Swimming Team.

On December 8, 1941, the day after the attack on Pearl Harbor, Morgenthaler was called to active duty in the U.S. Army Corps of Engineers as a second lieutenant in the 21st Aviation Engineer Regiment. He was promoted to captain, commanding a line company in the North African campaign building airfields in North Africa. Subsequently, in Italy, he was the chief technical officer for the area engineer of Eastern Italy. Morgenthaler served as a major in the U.S. Army Reserves until his discharge.

Morgenthaler married Lindsay Jordan in 1945 and had four children. He died on June 17, 2016, at the age of 96.

== Career ==
Following military service, Morgenthaler joined an entrepreneurial team in founding a startup company and, later, served in several other such companies. As vice president and director of sales of Delavan Manufacturing Company, he helped build the largest manufacturer of jet engine fuel nozzles in the world. Following this, he was recruited by J.H. Whitney & Company, one of the two original American venture capital firms, as president and CEO of their investee company, Foseco, Inc., one of their investments. He built this into the largest manufacturer of exothermic chemicals for foundries and steel mills in the U.S. and subsequently merged the company with its British licensor. Following this, he became chairman of the North America division.

In 1968 he resigned his position in Foseco and founded Morgenthaler Associates and subsequently, Morgenthaler Ventures, one of the few venture capitalists to do so using his own capital. Over the next 42 years, Morgenthaler Ventures invested in more than 300 companies in information technology and life sciences and bought industrial companies as a private equity firm.

Morgenthaler served as a director, president, or chairman of more than 30 companies during his career, ranging from startups to billion-dollar multinational corporations and in industries including metal fabrication, chemicals, information technology, life sciences, and others. He served as an advisor to the Brentwood Associates Funds, a limited partner of Hambrecht & Quist, and as vice chairman of the Edison Biotechnology Institute.

Morgenthaler served as one of the founding directors of the National Venture Capital Association (NVCA) and served as chairman of its Incentives Committee, working with the United States Congress to improve conditions for venture capital and entrepreneurship. He was president and, subsequently, chairman when the Steiger Amendment to the Revenue Act of 1978 was enacted, resulting in a roll-back of the capital gains tax from 49% to 28%. Under his leadership, NVCA was also able to amend the Prudent Man Rule of ERISA to allow pension funds to invest in venture capital and to liberalize conditions for public offerings for small companies.

== Other affiliations ==
Morgenthaler served as Cleveland Chapter chairman, national secretary and the first international senior vice president of the Young Presidents' Organization (YPO). An opponent of discrimination, he was acting chapter chairman of the Cleveland Chapter when the first Jewish member was admitted, and he was national membership chairman with the power of final decision when the first African-American was admitted into YPO. Upon graduation from YPO, Morgenthaler was admitted to the Chief Executive's Organization (CEO), the honorary group for former YPO leadership. He was elected president of CEO (1975–76).

Morgenthaler was a member of the President's Circle and a member of the Science, Technology, and Economic Policy (STEP) Board of the National Academies. Morgenthaler's other activities included: life emeritus trustee and distinguished fellow of the Cleveland Clinic; visiting committee and dean's advisory committee of MIT; international advisory board for the Center for International Relations and Politics of Carnegie Mellon University; dean's advisory committee of the Tepfer School of Carnegie Mellon University; visiting committee and president's advisory committee of Case Western Reserve University; dean's advisory committee of the Weatherhead School of Management of Case Western Reserve University; and overseer of the Hoover Institution.

Morgenthaler's philanthropic activities included funding: a professorship of entrepreneurship at Carnegie Mellon University, a founding sponsorship of the Entrepreneurship Center at MIT, the Morgenthaler Fellows Program at the Cleveland Clinic, the David T. Morgenthaler II Fellows Program at Stanford University and the Einstein Society of the National Academies. At Stanford University, the David T. Morgenthaler Grand Prize for the BASES (Business Association of Stanford Engineering Students) $50K Entrepreneurs' Challenge was established in his honor.

His awards include the first Lifetime Achievement Award granted by the NVCA in 1996, the Private Equity Lifetime Achievement Award, the Private Equity Analyst's Hall of Fame, the Association for Corporate Growth Lifetime Achievement Award, the Harvard Business School "Entrepreneur of the Year" Award, one of the two first Honorary Fellows of the Kauffman Foundation, and the first Lifetime Achievement Award of the International Business Forum (IBF).
