= Goodbody & Co. =

Former New York City stock brokerage firm

Goodbody & Co. was a United States stock brokerage firm headquartered in New York City. It was founded in 1886 by Irishman Robert Goodbody after the demise of Goodbody, Glynn, and Dow.

== Fate ==
It was the most prominent victim of the Wall Street paperwork crisis of the late 1960s. A single computer glitch in 1969 had cost the firm $7.5 million.

At the time of its collapse, it was the fifth-largest stock brokerage in the United States. Goodbody's financial distress dated back at least two years to its inability to cope with massive trading volume in the stock market and a subsequent partial breakdown in its paper work processing.

There had been an earlier plan for the Utilities and Industries Corporation and Loew's Theatres, Inc., to invest a total of $20 million in Goodbody had fallen through.

To save its customers from loss, in October 1970, it was announced that it would be merged into Merrill Lynch, which was completed in December 1970. At the time, it was the largest merger ever between US stockbroking firms. Goodbody had around 225,000 clients on its books, serviced through 95 offices.

Merrill Lynch had driven a particularly hard bargain demanding guarantees from the New York Stock Exchange (NYSE) in regard to covering whatever surprise losses might be found upon closer inspection. This had been a wise step as, in July 1971, it was reported that the true scale of the hidden losses at Goodbody was around $24.3 million. A special assessment was made of all NYSE member firms to cover the loss.

In 1976, the NYSE determined that the firm's senior partner, Harold Goodbody, (grandson of the firm's founder) had filed false financial statements and failed properly to supervise the business. The exchange banned him from re-entering the stock brokerage business.

== Goodbody family ==
Two other notable companies were also set up by members of the Goodbody family, Goodbody Stockbrokers and A&L Goodbody Solicitors, both of which are still in operation as of 2022.
