= Dow Jones Transportation Average =

Stock market index

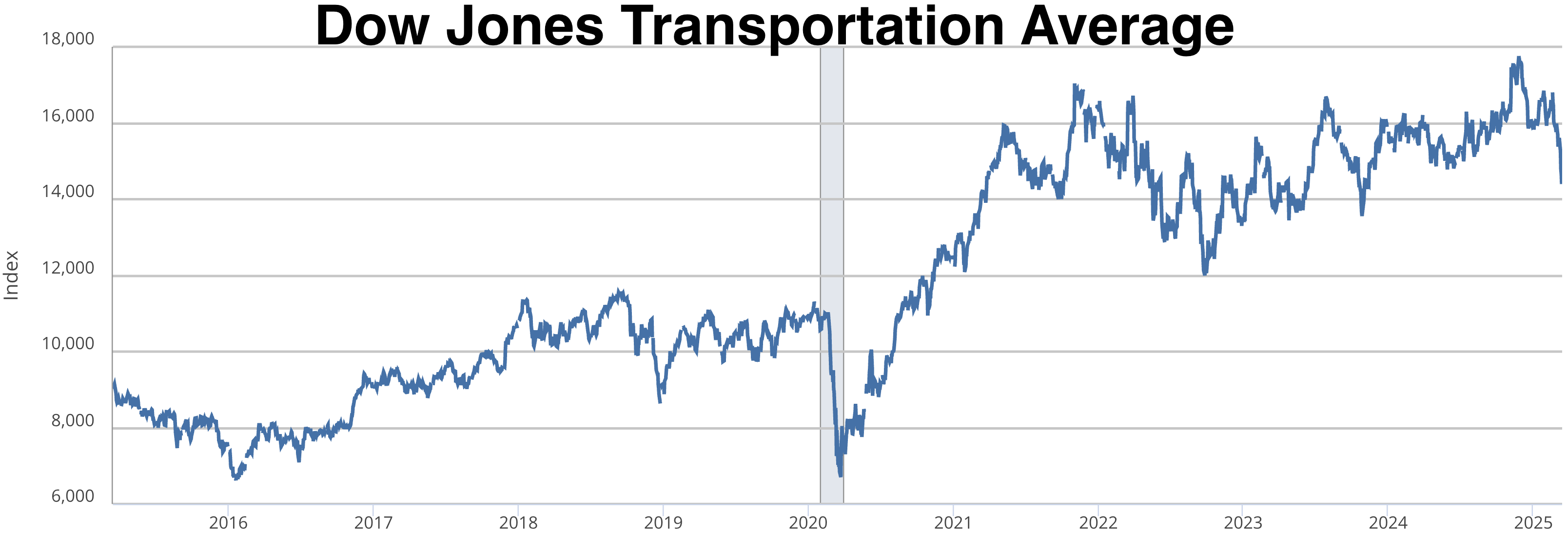
Dow Jones Transportation Average 2015-2025

The Dow Jones Transportation Average, (DJTA, also called the "Dow Jones Transports"), index ticker symbol DJT is a U.S. stock market index from S&P Dow Jones Indices of the transportation sector, and is the most widely recognized gauge of the American transportation sector. It is the oldest stock index still in use, being in use longer than its better-known relative, the Dow Jones Industrial Average (DJIA).

== Components ==
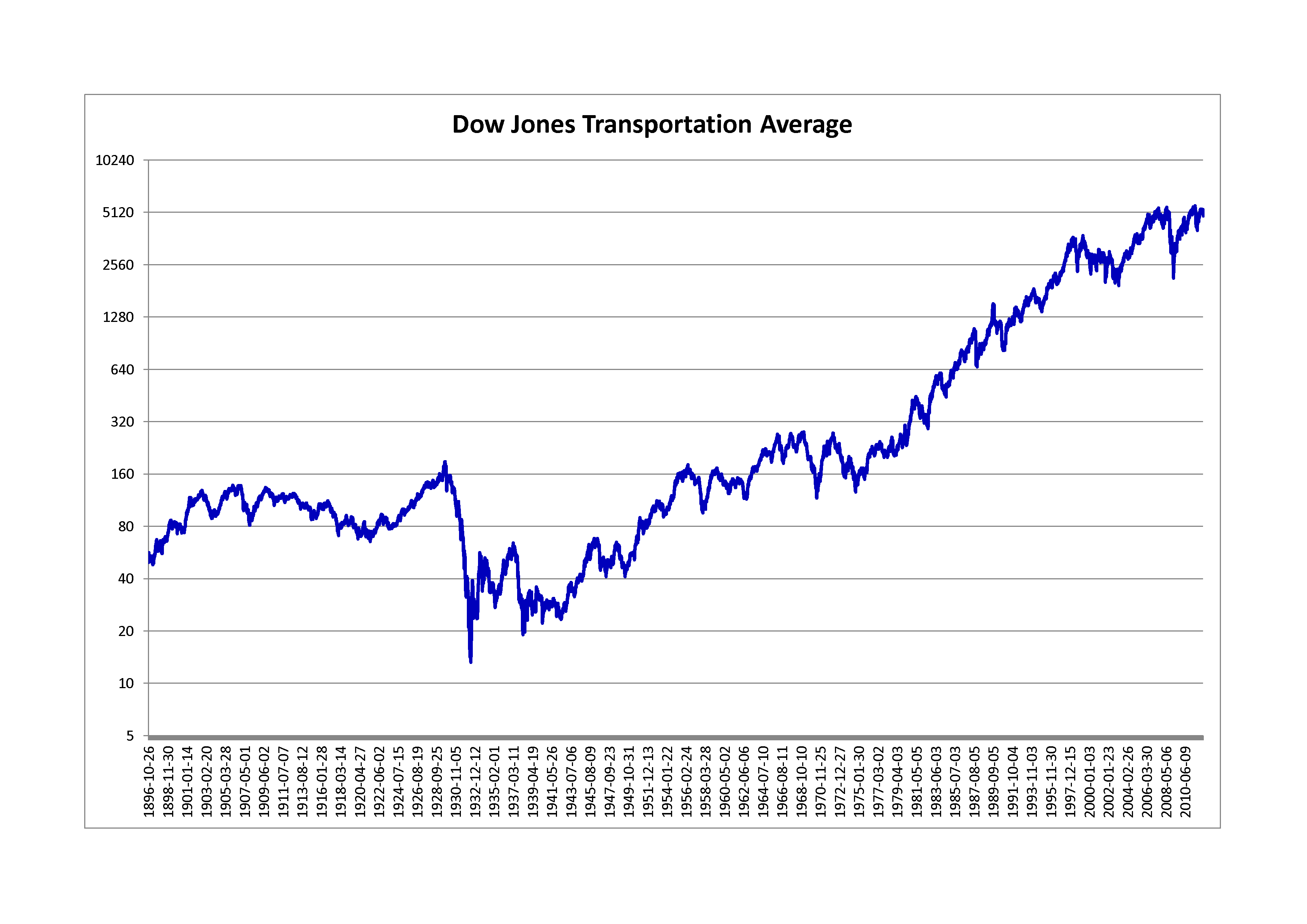
Dow Jones Transportation Average 1896–2012

The index is a running average of the stock prices of twenty transportation corporations, with each stock's price weighted to adjust for stock splits and other factors. As a result, it can change at any time the markets are open. The figure mentioned in news reports is usually the figure derived from the prices at the close of the market for the day.

Changes in the index's composition are rare, and generally occur only after corporate acquisitions or other dramatic shifts in a component's core business. Should such an event require that one component be replaced, the entire index is reviewed.

As of June 1, 2026, the index consists of the following 20 companies:

DJTA component companies, showing ticker symbols and transport sector
Company	Ticker	Sector
Alaska Air Group	ALK	Airline
Avis Budget Group	CAR	Rental and Leasing Service
C.H. Robinson	CHRW	Trucking
CSX Corporation	CSX	Railroads and Real Estate
Delta Air Lines	DAL	Airline
Expeditors International	EXPD	Logistics and Freight
FedEx	FDX	Delivery Service
FedEx Freight	FDXF	Freight Services
J.B. Hunt	JBHT	Transportation and Logistics
Kirby Corporation	KEX	Marine Transportation
Landstar System	LSTR	Transportation
Matson, Inc.	MATX	Marine Transportation
Norfolk Southern Corporation	NSC	Railroads
Old Dominion Freight Line	ODFL	Trucking
Ryder	R	Transportation and Logistics
Southwest Airlines	LUV	Airline
Uber	UBER	Transport
Union Pacific Corporation	UNP	Railroads
United Airlines Holdings	UAL	Airline
United Parcel Service	UPS	Delivery Service

Alaska Air Group replaced AMR Corporation on December 2, 2011, after AMR corp. filed for bankruptcy protection.

Effective October 30, 2012, Kirby Corp. replaced Overseas Shipholding Group, Inc.

Effective October 1, 2014, Avis Budget Group Inc. replaced GATX Corporation.

On October 15, 2015, American Airlines Group replaced Con-way.

Effective December 14, 2021, Old Dominion Freight Line replaced Kansas City Southern.

Effective February 26, 2024, Uber replaced JetBlue Airways. The index change was prompted by JetBlue’s low weight in the index of less than one-half of one percentage point caused by its low share price.

On June 1, 2026, FedEx Freight was spun off from parent company FedEx, and the new company replaced American Airlines Group in the index, with American Airlines' low weight in the index (less than one-half of one percentage point) being cited as the reason for its selection for removal.

== History ==
The average was created on July 3, 1884, by Charles Dow, co-founder of Dow Jones & Company, as part of the "Customer's Afternoon Letter". At its inception, it consisted of eleven transportation companies—nine railroads and two non-rail companies:

- Chicago, Milwaukee and St. Paul Railway
- Chicago and North Western Railway
- Delaware, Lackawanna and Western Railroad
- Lake Shore and Michigan Southern Railway
- Louisville and Nashville Railroad
- Missouri Pacific Railway
- New York Central Railroad
- Northern Pacific Railroad preferred stock
- Pacific Mail Steamship Company (not a railroad)
- Union Pacific Railway
- Western Union (not a railroad)

As a result of the dominating presence of railroads, the Transportation Average was often referred to as "rails" in financial discussions in the early and middle part of the 20th century.

== Price history ==
In 1964, the index first broke 200, slightly over where it was in 1929.

In 1983, the index first broke 500. In 1987, the index broke 1000. It closed at 2146.89 on March 9, 2009, having a low coincident with some other indices; this was a bit above its low of 1942.19 on March 11, 2003.

The index broke above the mid-5000s to begin a run of record highs on January 15, 2013, at a time when the better-known Industrials stood about 5% below all-time highs achieved more than five years earlier. By May, the Industrials and all other major indices except the NASDAQ group were making all-time highs, including the Transports, which reached new closing and intraday records above the 6,500 level. On October 24, 2013, the Transports closed at 7,022.79, for its first close above 7,000 points. It closed the year at a record high of 7,400.57. On May 27, 2014, it first closed above 8,000 points. The index closed above 9000 on November 10, 2014. At the close of 2014, the index hit 9139.92. At the close of 2015, the index hit 7508.71, a loss of 17.85% on the year.

== Annual returns ==
The following table shows the price return of the Dow Jones Transportation Average, which was calculated back to 1924.

End-of-year closing values for DJTA
Year	Closing value	Change in points	Change in percent
1924	98.33		
1925	112.93	14.60	14.85
1926	120.86	7.93	7.02
1927	140.30	19.44	16.08
1928	151.14	10.84	7.73
1929	144.72	−6.42	−4.25
1930	96.58	−48.14	−33.26
1931	33.63	−62.95	−65.18
1932	25.90	−7.73	−22.99
1933	40.80	14.90	57.53
1934	36.44	−4.36	−10.69
1935	40.48	4.04	11.09
1936	53.63	13.15	32.49
1937	29.46	−24.17	−45.07
1938	33.98	4.52	15.34
1939	31.63	−2.35	−6.92
1940	28.13	−3.50	−11.07
1941	25.42	−2.71	−9.63
1942	27.39	1.97	7.75
1943	33.56	6.17	22.53
1944	48.40	14.84	44.22
1945	62.80	14.40	29.75
1946	51.13	−11.67	−18.58
1947	52.48	1.35	2.64
1948	52.86	0.38	0.72
1949	52.76	−0.10	−0.19
1950	77.64	24.88	47.16
1951	81.70	4.06	5.23
1952	111.27	29.57	36.19
1953	94.03	−17.24	−15.49
1954	145.86	51.83	55.12
1955	163.29	17.43	11.95
1956	153.23	−10.06	−6.16
1957	96.96	−56.27	−36.72
1958	157.65	60.69	62.59
1959	154.05	−3.60	−2.28
1960	130.85	−23.20	−15.06
1961	143.84	12.99	9.93
1962	141.04	−2.80	−1.95
1963	178.54	37.50	26.59
1964	205.34	26.80	15.01
1965	247.48	42.14	20.52
1966	202.97	−44.51	−17.99
1967	233.24	30.27	14.91
1968	271.60	38.36	16.45
1969	176.34	−95.26	−35.07
1970	171.52	−4.82	−2.73
1971	243.72	72.20	42.09
1972	227.17	−16.55	−6.79
1973	196.19	−30.98	−13.64
1974	143.44	−52.75	−26.89
1975	172.65	29.21	20.36
1976	237.03	64.38	37.29
1977	217.18	−19.85	−8.37
1978	206.56	−10.62	−4.89
1979	252.39	45.83	22.19
1980	398.10	145.71	57.73
1981	380.30	−17.80	−4.47
1982	448.38	68.08	17.90
1983	598.59	150.21	33.50
1984	558.13	−40.46	−6.76
1985	708.21	150.08	26.89
1986	807.17	98.96	13.97
1987	748.86	−58.31	−7.22
1988	969.84	220.98	29.51
1989	1,177.81	207.97	21.44
1990	910.23	−267.58	−22.72
1991	1,358.00	447.77	49.19
1992	1,449.21	91.21	6.72
1993	1,762.32	313.11	21.61
1994	1,455.03	−307.29	−17.44
1995	1,981.00	525.97	36.15
1996	2,255.67	274.67	13.87
1997	3,256.50	1,000.83	44.37
1998	3,149.31	−107.19	−3.29
1999	2,977.20	−172.11	−5.47
2000	2,946.60	−30.60	−1.03
2001	2,639.99	−306.61	−10.41
2002	2,309.96	−330.03	−12.50
2003	3,007.05	697.09	30.18
2004	3,798.05	791.00	26.30
2005	4,196.03	397.98	10.48
2006	4,560.20	364.17	8.68
2007	4,570.55	10.35	0.23
2008	3,537.15	−1,033.40	−22.61
2009	4,099.63	562.48	15.90
2010	5,106.75	1,007.12	24.57
2011	5,019.69	−87.06	−1.70
2012	5,306.77	287.08	5.72
2013	7,400.57	2,093.80	39.46
2014	9,139.92	1,739.35	23.50
2015	7,508.71	−1,631.21	−17.85
2016	9,043.90	1,535.19	20.45
2017	10,612.29	1,568.36	17.34
2018	9,170.40	−1,441.89	−13.59
2019	10,901.28	1,730.88	18.87
2020	12,506.93	1,605.65	14.73
2021	16,478.26	3,971.33	31.75
2022	13,391.91	−3,086.35	−18.73
2023	15,898.85	2,506.94	18.72
2024	15,895.75	−3.10	−0.02
2025	17,357.19	1,461.44	9.19

== Record values ==
Category	All-time highs	
Closing	22,596.69	Friday, June 12, 2026
Intraday	24,825.70	Wednesday, April 22, 2026

== Investing ==
There is no fund that tracks this index. There are funds that have a similar behavior, such as iShares Transportation Average ETF (NYSE Arca: IYT).

== See also ==
- Dow Jones Composite Average
- Dow theory
