= Derek Reisfield =

American media and technology executive

Derek Reisfield is an American media and technology executive. He was the founder and chairman of MarketWatch, a leading financial news and information site and one of the most successful content start ups of the Internet Boom. The company was sold to Dow Jones for more than $500 million. Reisfield was also a founder and principal of i-hatch Ventures, a leading New York City based venture capital company.

He was named president of CBS's New Media division in 1996, becoming the youngest division president in the company's history. He was responsible for development of over 200 Internet sites including cbs.com and sportsline.com. Before that he was Vice President of Business Development and Corporate Strategy for CBS Corporation and Westinghouse Electric Company. Reisfield was a senior consultant with McKinsey & Company, the international strategy consulting firm. His first job was as a newspaper editor.

In 2008, along with Scott E. Roulet, Reisfield founded BBN Solutions, an online network of advertisers, and publications. BBN also developed a successful lead generation and marketing consulting businesses. It partnered with WPP Group. The company was successfully sold to Madison Logic in 2015.

Derek was the President and CFO of Ondas Holdings, a NASDAQ (ONDS) listed autonomous drone company.

He is the great nephew of the actress Greta Garbo.
