= Ethel Bergstresser McCoy =

American philatelist

- Born: June 20, 1893
- Died: August 17, 1980 (aged 87)
- Spouses: Walter R. McCoy; widow of Bert A. Stewart
- Engineering career
- Institutions: American Air Mail Society; Essay-Proof Society; American Philatelic Society; Collectors Club of New York
- Projects: Was most noted for her collection of United States airmail stamps
- Awards: APS Hall of Fame

Ethel Bergstresser (Stewart) McCoy (June 20, 1893 – August 17, 1980), of New York City, was a philatelist who created a number of stamp collections, and was active within the philatelic community. She was the daughter of Charles Bergstresser (1858–1923), one of the founders of Dow Jones & Co.

== Collecting interests ==
Ethel McCoy is most noted for her collection of United States airmail stamps, which included a block of four, acquired in 1936, of the famous “Inverted Jenny” listed as C3a in the Scott catalog.

During the 1955 American Philatelic Society Convention, held in Norfolk, Virginia, the very valuable block was stolen. In 1979, the year before she died, she bequeathed the block, if it could be found, to the American Philatelic Research Library. In an investigation led by philatelic "detective" James H. Beal, the two stamps on the left side of the block of four (positions 65 and 75) were eventually recovered.

== Philatelic activity ==
Ethel McCoy was one of the first women to break the appearance of an all-male barrier in the philatelic community, and in 1937 she was named director of the American Air Mail Society.

== Honors and awards ==
McCoy was named to the American Philatelic Society Hall of Fame in 1981.
