= Private Equity Analyst =

Private Equity Analyst is a newsletter that since 1988 has provided news and information about the private-equity market and its investment specialities, including venture capital, leveraged buyouts, mezzanine investing and turnarounds.

Based in Wellesley, Massachusetts, it also conducts the Private Equity Analyst range of eight annual conferences of the private-capital industry.

On Feb. 19, 2004 Dow Jones & Company announced that it had signed an agreement to acquire the stock and assets of the Alternative Investor Group, the publisher of Private Equity Analyst.

Subscriptions cost $1,495 a year within the U.S., and a single issue costs $150.
