= Expeditors International =

Logistics company in Washington, US

Coordinates: 47.606°N 122.334562°W

Expeditors International of Washington, Inc.
- Type: Public
- Traded as: NYSE: EXPD; DJTA component; S&P 500 component; Nasdaq: EXPD (1984–2023)
- Industry: Logistics
- Founded: 1979; 47 years ago
- Headquarters: Bellevue, Washington, U.S.
- Key people: Dan Wall 4/1/2025~; (president & CEO); Gabe Schoonover (CSO); David Hackett (CFO)
- Products: Freight Forwarding Services; Customs Brokerage
- Revenue: ▲US$8.1 billion (2018)
- Operating income: ▲US$796 million (2018)
- Net income: ▲US$818 million (2018)
- Total assets: ▲US$3.3 billion (2018)
- Total equity: ▲US$1.99 billion (2018)
- Number of employees: 19,588 (2021)
- Website: expeditors.com

Expeditors International of Washington, Inc. (commonly referred to as Expeditors) is an American Fortune 500 service-based logistics company with headquarters in Bellevue, Washington. Expeditors generates highly optimized and customized supply chain solutions for clients with unified technology systems integrated through a global network of over 340+ locations in 100+ countries on six continents.

As a service-based company, Expeditors does not own the aircraft, ships, or trucks used every day.

== Financial information ==
Expeditors became a publicly traded company in 1984 with the listing of its shares on NASDAQ under the ticker symbol EXPD and was added to the NASDAQ-100 in 2002. In November 2023, Expeditors transferred the listing of its common stock to the New York Stock Exchange NYSE, keeping the same symbol "EXPD". During its first year as a public company, Expeditors reported more than $50 million in gross revenues and $2.1 million in net earnings. Expeditors was #299 on the 2021 Fortune 500. Total revenues exceeded 10 billion ($10.116 billion) in 2021.

The company became known for its unusually candid written responses to analyst questions in SEC Form 8-K filings. Some commentators have suggested the filings were written personally by CEO Peter Rose, as well as its responses to questions submitted to the company, which are placed on Expeditors' investor website. Rose announced his retirement in March 2014 as CEO, with his retirement as Chairman effective May 2015.

== Compensation structure ==
Expeditors maintains a compensation structure that is unique to the logistics industry. According to their 2003 annual report, "Each of the Company's branches are independent profit centers and the primary compensation for the branch management group comes in the form of incentive-based compensation calculated directly from the operating income of that branch. This compensation structure ensures that the allocation of revenue and expense among components of services [...] are done in an objective manner on a fair value basis."

== See also ==
- Globalization
- World economy
