= Financial News =

British weekly financial newspaper published in London

- Type: Weekly newspaper
- Owner: Dow Jones & Company
- Founded: 1996
- Language: English
- Headquarters: The News Building, London
- Circulation: 40,638 (June 2018)
- Website: fnlondon.com

Financial News is a weekly financial newspaper published in London and news website, founded in 1996. It is published by eFinancial News Limited, and provides news and opinions regarding the financial services sector, and information about its people.

Financial News is owned by Dow Jones & Company, which acquired eFinancial News in 2007. It is part of the Barron's Group division, which also includes Barron's, Factiva, MarketWatch and Mansion Global.

Financial News launched a revamped, mobile-first website and new weekly print edition in January 2017.

== Titles ==
In addition to the publication of the Financial News, the company operates FNLondon.com, an updated daily website version of Financial News, and The Private Equity News, which provides daily news and analysis for Europe's private equity industry. The Private Equity News website, launched in 2003, is the counterpart to the weekly Private Equity News hard copy.

== Coverage ==
The newspaper and website's coverage is primarily the financial services industry in Europe, UK-focused. It publishes major weekly news and opinion on investment banking, asset management, private equity, fintech, trading and regulation, and information on key personnel moves, recruitment and employment trends, regulation regarding pay, business education, and diversity.

== Circulation ==
The ABC Audited average circulation for the Financial News print edition for the six-month period ending June 2016 was 15,808. The readership profile is highly educated and affluent professionals, mainly in the London-based financial services industries. The average annual income of Financial News readers is over 200,000 pounds sterling.

There were 319,728 visits to the main website in June 2016, with about 720,000 page views.
