= Board on Science, Technology, and Economic Policy =

The United States National Academy of Sciences' Board on Science, Technology, and Economic Policy (STEP) is a board of the United States National Academy of Sciences.

The mandate of the Board is to integrate understanding of scientific, technological, and economic elements in the formulation of national policies affecting the economic well-being of the United States. The program’s focus is on the dynamics of the macroeconomic and microeconomic variables, their relationship to the industrial structure of the economy, effect on high-technology manufacturing and service sectors, and influence on U.S. scientific and technological advancement through examination of trade, human resources, fiscal, research and development, intellectual property and other policies. Policymakers responsible for these areas in the executive branch and Congress are the audience for the STEP Board’s work in the form of consensus reports, conferences, and workshops. The current executive director is Stephen A. Merrill, Ph.D. and the Board Chair is Paul Joskow, president of the Sloan Foundation.

== History and evolution ==
=== Establishment ===
The Academies began to address issues of U.S. competitiveness and innovation in the late 1970s and early 1980s through a series of industry studies by the NAE and broad policy studies by the Committee on Science, Engineering, and Public Policy (COSEPUP).

A leading NAS economist, Dale Jorgenson, and NAE industrialists Ralph Landau and George Hatsopoulos were concerned that this work, and national innovation policy more broadly, did not sufficiently reflect the contributions economics could make to understanding of trends and policy prescriptions to improve outcomes. They proposed to the National Research Council (NRC) Governing Board of Directors of the NAS to create a new standing committee as a forum for dialogue among economists, technologists, and industrial managers to those ends. The Board on Science, Technology, and Economic Policy (STEP) was established in 1991, originally as an independent board with funding from the NRC and the Alfred P. Sloan Foundation. Subsequently, it was combined with COSEPUP and Government-University-Industry Research Roundtable (GUIRR, which was renamed in 2024 to the Government-University-Industry-Philanthropy Research Roundtable, or GUIPRR) in the Policy Division, at which time the Academy and Institute presidents were made ex-officio members to make the three units more similar in structure.

=== Composition ===
In composing the first slate of members, the Academies added a fourth category of expertise and experience – finance and investment – and took care to ensure that among the members were people with high-level public policy experience. Over the past 16 years the membership has included leading industrialists (Rube Mettler, Don Peterson, Bill Spencer), three Nobel Laureates (Mike Spence, Joe Stiglitz, and Jim Heckman) among many leading microeconomists, prominent venture capitalists (Burton McMurtry, Kathy Behrens, and David Morgenthaler), scientists and engineers from the Academies (George Whitesides and Vint Cerf), former policymakers (James Lynn, Mary Good, and Alan Wolff), and people whose careers have bridged the corporate and nonprofit sectors (Edward Penhoet) or industry and elective politics (Amo Houghton, Jr.). In STEP’s first decade the majority of industrialists represented heavy manufacturing and information technology. In recent years there has been an effort to recruit more senior managers from life science-based industries and services.

=== Policy environment and focus ===
Not coincidentally, concern about Japanese competition and fear of a progressive decline in the U.S. manufacturing base was peaking at the time STEP was created. Indeed, the perception that Japan enjoyed a broad and enduring competitive advantage from a substantially lower cost of capital was a motivating factor in establishing the Board and became the subject of its first conference and report. In the late 1990s, of course, pessimism gave way to extreme confidence in the economy, lasting until the dot-com collapse. The contemporary policy environment is again one of concern if not alarm about U.S. economic performance, although vis-à-vis different sources of competition.

In this fluctuating environment, STEP’s focus has not shifted away from the U.S. position in the global economy. Investing for Productivity and Prosperity was followed by a series of projects examining development of international technical standards and testing certification, technology policy as a source of trade friction among the industrialized countries, tax policy affecting the location of foreign direct investment and R&D performance, evaluation of U.S. and foreign government interventions in support of commercial technology development, and the effects of foreign government conditions on aerospace sales and investment. A major focus since the late 1990s has been on the reasons for the improved competitiveness of many U.S. industries and the resurgence in productivity growth, the extent to which these are accurately measured and reflected in the national economic accounts, and how they can be sustained.

Nevertheless, the STEP portfolio has become more diversified, with projects on the economics of K-12 education reform, impact of technology on jobs and wages, supply of IT workers, quality of innovation-related statistics, functioning of the patent system, impact of intellectual property on research, shifts in the federal research portfolio by field, financing of entrepreneurship, prizes as a tool of innovation policy, and aeronautics R&D at NASA. This diversification has been a key to STEP’s success and endurance, but the board is mindful that global competition and its effects on Americans’ employment and welfare remain the principal driver of its agenda. When, as now, public and political concern is ascendant, other institutions and others in the Academy are quickly drawn into this policy arena to compete for many of the same sources of financial support. Within the past 3 or 4 years alone nominally similar programs have been launched at the Council on Foreign Relations, Brookings Institution, Center for Strategic and International Studies, American Association for the Advancement of Science, and Woodrow Wilson International Center for Scholars and spun off from the Progressive Policy Institute.

Since nearly all of STEP’s work is microeconomic, other ways to parse STEP’s portfolio are by industrial sector and by microeconomic policy. On the first dimension, STEP has focused intensively on semiconductors, software, computing (and its component technologies), and biotechnology and given considerable attention also to aviation, chemicals, pharmaceuticals, medical devices, telecommunications, metal fabrication, and finance. At the same time, STEP has done significant although by no means exhaustive work on the following microeconomic policies – tax, trade, standards, K-12 and graduate education, workforce training, intellectual property, economic statistics, and, of course, direct and indirect research and development support.

Areas that have received little attention to date are agriculture, energy and power, and environmental regulation. Although these are the domains of other standing NRC units that, of course, does not preclude STEP from undertaking projects in those areas tailored to its strengths nor does it preclude collaborations. Discussions have in fact occurred with each of those units (BANR, BEES, and BEST) and led to formal collaborative proposals, but unfortunately those proposals have not attracted sponsors.

== Accomplishments ==
=== Dialogue ===
Encouraging cross-disciplinary, cross-sector dialogue on issues of competitiveness and innovation was a major theme of the NRC discussions leading to the creation of STEP. The Board itself has sustained this dialogue across many changes in membership notably including the departure recently of the last original member, Dale Jorgenson. Meetings are well attended and members frequently remark on the high caliber of discussion and learning across disciplines and sectors.

STEP has extended this form of dialogue to the many ad hoc committees under its oversight. Normally, STEP study committees include 2 or 3 STEP members – a testament to the fact that many (perhaps most) projects are conceived in board discussions and members become committed to helping carry them through to fruition. In addition, an effort is made to ensure that study committee rosters recommended to the Division Chair and the President include a mix of expertise and experience similar to that on the board itself – industrial technologists, economists, financial executives, academic scientists, and former policymakers

STEP has also contributed to dialogue within the NRC. Staff are frequently asked to suggest committee members and other resources for studies in other units. Formal collaborations have involved the Science, Technology, and Law Committee, Committee on National Statistics, Computer Science and Telecommunications Board, Board on Higher Education and the Workforce, Board on Testing and Assessment, National Cancer Policy Board, and Board on Health Care Services (of the National Academies).

=== Contributions to research ===
STEP has benefited from and exploited the microeconomic field of technology and productivity analysis that is the fairly recent legacy of Griliches, Jorgenson, Solow, Mansfield, and others as well as the work of international trade economists. But the fact is that in many of the specific policy areas of STEP work – intellectual property, standards, program evaluation, etc. – there is a serious deficit of empirical research. Rather than rely on anecdote and judgment, the Board has when possible taken the step – unusual for the Academy – of supporting small-scale original research projects, often surveys. This was done in studies of the patent system, Small Business Innovation Research (SBIR) program, Advanced Technology Program (ATP), and biomedical researchers’ experience with intellectual property. In all of these cases, the research results strongly influenced study committees’ findings and recommendations. That, in turn, has encouraged more research. In the case of the patent study, the Board in 2002 issued an RFP, received 80-odd proposals, and selected 9 projects for full or co-funding. This undoubtedly contributed to the subsequent flowering of empirical research on intellectual property systems and policies.

More typical of the Academy, STEP work has helped shape the agendas of investigators and research sponsors. A prime example is the 2001 workshop, Using Human Resource Data to Track Innovation, whose premise was that studying the qualifications, career paths, and activities of industrial scientists, engineers, and other professionals could reveal a great deal about innovation processes, especially those beyond the R&D stage. The workshop has shaped the subsequent work of Paula Stephan, who was commissioned to write the principal paper for the meeting, and led directly to a series of NSF workshops, other research initiatives, and efforts to improve the utility of data from the NSF surveys of PhD-holders. A community of investigators is exploring ways to match publication and patent data with NSF human resource data. Stephan attributes all of this activity directly to the seminal STEP workshop.

== Domestic policy impact ==
STEP reports have had a demonstrable impact on public policy discussions and outcomes. Examples include:

A Patent System for the 21st Century (2004). In April 2004 a STEP committee chaired by Yale President Richard Levin and former Xerox CTO Mark Myers issued a final report of a broad study of how well the U.S. patent system is fulfilling its purpose of encouraging research, innovation, and the dissemination of knowledge and how it is adapting to rapid technological and economic changes. It found that while the system has shown admirable flexibility in accommodating new technologies, there is reason to be concerned about the quality of issued patents, the resources available to the US Patent and Trademark Office to keep up with the pace of technological change and volume of applications, features of U.S. law that inhibit the dissemination of information contained in patents and that raise the cost and uncertainty of litigation over patent validity and infringement, access to patented research technologies for basic non-commercial research, and redundancies and inconsistencies among national patent systems that raise the cost of global intellectual property protection. With dedicated dissemination funds provided by the NRC, a private foundation, and several companies and law firms, a very extensive outreach effort, involving public meetings across the country, was undertaken. The committee co-chairs were lead-off witnesses in Senate and House patent reform hearings in the spring of 2005 and again in 2007. Five of the report’s seven recommendations are core provisions of legislation introduced by the committee chairs in the 109th Congress and expected to be re-introduced in the 110th.

- Trends in Federal Support of Research and Graduate Education (2001). Using data collected by NSF annually from federal agencies but rarely analyzed, this report documented in detail significant shifts in the allocation of public research spending and graduate student support in the 1990s and related these to state, foundation, and industry funding patterns. It found a substantial real decline in federal investment in most of the physical sciences and engineering fields and corresponding declines in the number of federally supported graduate students in those fields. The report was cited by the Senate Appropriations Committee, OSTP Director Jack Marburger, then NSF Director Rita Colwell, and the Semiconductor Industry Association. It contributed to the recommendations of the President’s committee of Advisers on Science and Technology (PCAST), Council on Competitiveness, and COSEPUP Augustine panel, the President’s 2007 budget, and bipartisan congressional majorities for significant increases in the federal funding of physical science and engineering research.
- The Advanced Technology Program: Assessing Outcomes (2001). This report represented a comprehensive review of the operations of the Advanced Technology Program (ATP), administered by the Commerce Department's National Institute of Standards and Technology (NIST) to accelerate development of high-risk technologies with promising economic benefits through cost-shared funding. The study committee concluded that the program has shown considerable success attributable in part to appropriate selection criteria, rigorous peer review of technical feasibility and commercial potential, and careful evaluation of outcomes. The report was the subject of a hearing before the House Science Committee and was cited by the Senate Appropriations Committee in justifying an increase in ATP’s funding. STEP’s evaluation is undoubtedly a factor in ATP’s survival despite repeated administration proposals and House of Representative votes to terminate the program. NIST recently issued a solicitation for new ATP proposals.

=== International reputation ===
In part through the Board’s outreach efforts and in part because of interest abroad in the contributions of federal and state government policy to U.S. economic performance, there is a growing international audience for STEP’s work, evidenced by the high volume of visits to the website and invitations for presentations to international organizations (e.g., various committees of the OECD, parts of the European Commission, World Intellectual Property Organization, and European Patent Office), and national government officials and international academic gatherings too numerous to list. Originally confined to the industrial countries this interest has extended to the governments of and academics in the emerging economies – China, India, Brazil, Vietnam, and the former Soviet republics.

STEP has received project support from the OECD, European Commission, Industry Canada, and Embassy of the United Kingdom. A formal collaboration with two of the German economic research institutes yielded two reports, and in 1995 STEP was asked to host an international conference on technology and jobs preparatory to the G-7 Summit meeting.

Congress is a principal consumer of STEP work, and the Board has conducted or is conducting three congressionally mandated projects. A fourth mandate – the ongoing evaluation of 5 agencies’ SBIR programs – followed STEP work on SBIR but has been carried out under separate oversight. Discussion is underway with members of Congress of a major study of the role of intangible assets (R&D, intellectual property, software, worker training, and organizational competence) in economic growth. Nevertheless, what will appear in final legislation or bill report language is always highly uncertain; and agency compliance with congressional study mandates is not assured. STEP has twice negotiated language with congressional sponsors for studies that were eventually included in enacted legislation and developed proposals to the executive agencies directed to contract with the Academies, but the mandates were not executed.
