= Tablelands Advertiser =

Coordinates: 16°59′47″S 145°25′21″E

- Type: Weekly newspaper
- Format: Tabloid
- Owner(s): News Limited
- Editor: Pasco Rogato
- Headquarters: Mareeba, Queensland
- Website: Tablelands Advertiser

The Tablelands Advertiser is the weekly newspaper published for residents of the Atherton Tableland and Mareeba area.

The Tablelands Advertiser has a home delivery system that covers around four times the area of any other publication in the region. This means that over half of the 18,729 copies are delivered to homes, cattle stations and farms throughout the Far Northern rural region.

== See also ==
- Cairns Post
- Cairns Sun
- Port Douglas and Mossman Gazette
