= Old Dominion Freight Line =

American transportation company

Old Dominion Freight Line, Inc.

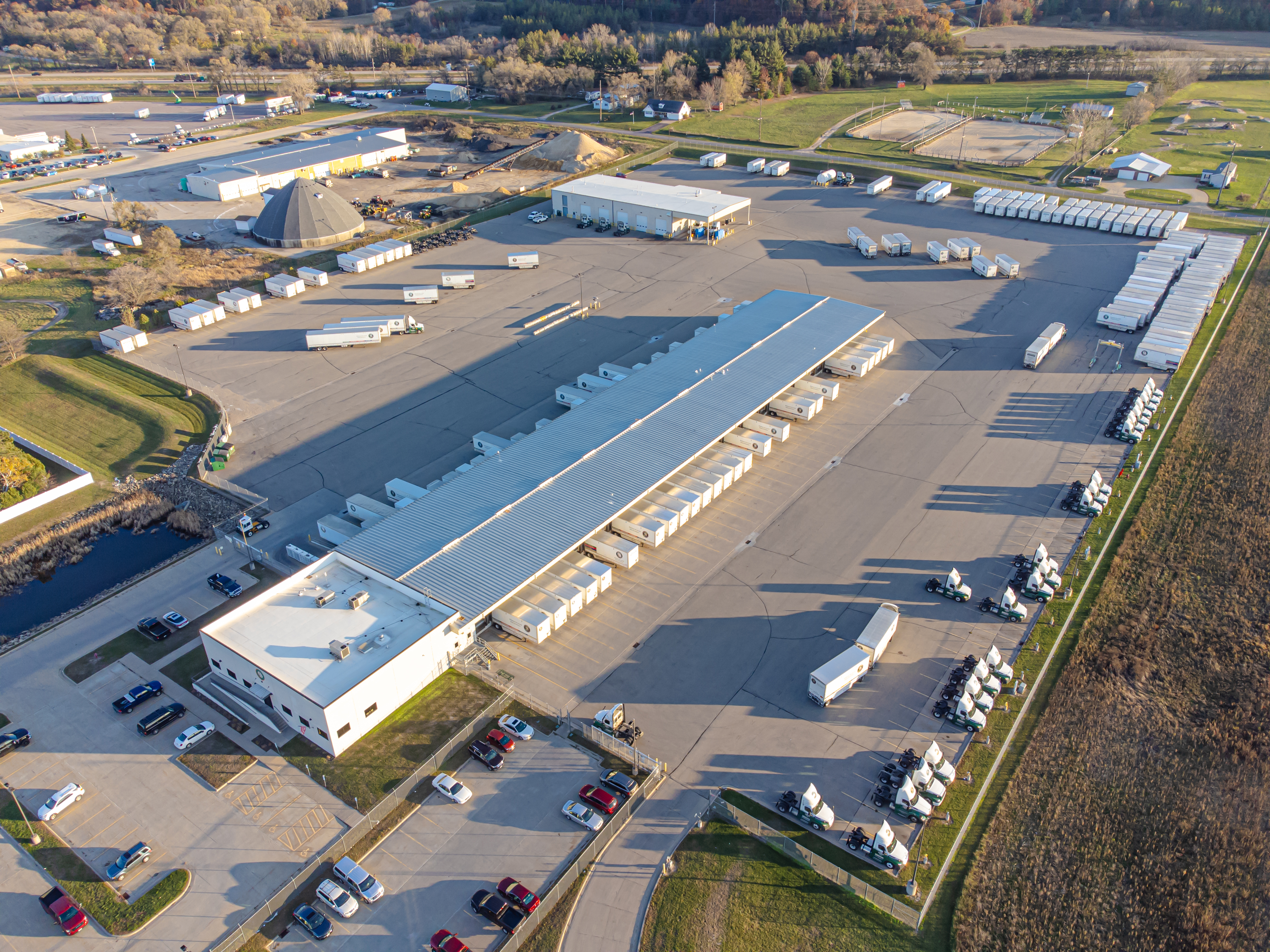
- Old Dominion Freight Line Service Center
- Type: Public
- Traded as: Nasdaq: ODFL; DJTA component; Nasdaq-100 component; S&P 500 component
- ISIN: US6795801009
- Industry: Transportation
- Founded: 1934; 92 years ago in Richmond, Virginia, U.S.
- Founders: Earl Congdon Sr.; Lillian Congdon
- Headquarters: Thomasville, North Carolina, U.S.
- Number of locations: 261 service centers (2024)
- Area served: Worldwide
- Key people: David S. Congdon (executive chairman); Kevin "Marty" Freeman (president & CEO); Gregory Plemmons (COO); Adam Satterfield (CFO)
- Revenue: ▼US$5.81 billion (2024)
- Operating income: ▼US$1.54 billion (2024)
- Net income: ▼US$1.19 billion (2024)
- Total assets: ▼US$5.49 billion (2024)
- Total equity: ▼US$4.24 billion (2024)
- Owners: Congdon family (11.8%)
- Number of employees: 21,895 (2024)
- Website: odfl.com

Old Dominion Freight Line, Inc. (ODFL) is an American regional, inter-regional and national less than truckload shipping (LTL) company. In addition to its core LTL services, the company offers expedited, logistics and household moving services.

The company has five primary product groups: Domestic, Expedited, People, Global, Household Services and Technology. Global offerings include full container load (FCL) and less-than-container load (LCL) service to the Caribbean, Europe, the Far East, Central America and South America. The company operates more than 5,800 tractors and more than 22,500 trailers.

== History ==
=== Foundation and early history ===
An ODFL truck hauling STAA doubles

Old Dominion Freight Line, Inc. traces its origins to 1934 when husband and wife Earl Congdon Sr. and Lillian Congdon (née Herbert) founded the company with a single straight truck running between Richmond and Norfolk, Virginia. The name is a reference to a common nickname for the Commonwealth of Virginia, the "Old Dominion." The company initially operated with Earl Sr. as its only driver, and with the pair running business operations from their home. Lillian served as an alternate driver if Earl Sr. was unavailable.

Following passage of the Motor Carrier Act of 1935, the Interstate Commerce Commission (ICC) began regulating the trucking industry. ODFL was initially granted a Certificate of Public Convenience and Necessity (CPCN) by the ICC to transport interstate freight on their original route between Richmond and Norfolk, but this freight had to be destined for transit outside the state of Virginia either internationally or interstate. The only other type of shipments ODFL was allowed to carry were interline shipments, transiting freight along this route on behalf of other carriers who did not possess a CPCN for that route.

The company moved its operations out of the Congdon's house into its terminal, a space outside a grocery store, in 1935. But, with that space lacking a loading dock, they moved again in 1936 to a facility with two truck bays. The facility was shared with Overnite Transportation with the two bays split between them. By the end of that year, ODFL was operating six tractor-trailers and 12 straight trucks and shortly thereafter moved to a dedicated seven-bay facility.

Through the late 1930s, the company made several moves to remain solvent under regulation. These included wet leasing a significant portion of their fleet to the Manchester Board and Paper Co. in 1936 and unsuccessfully attempting to lease operating authority from Carter Brothers Express Lines in 1939 to expand ODFL's routes. An attempt by employees to unionize under the Teamsters Union was unsuccessful in 1939 after a three-month strike. Despite some challenges, the company remained profitable thorough the end of the decade, but used its proceeds to finance expansion. By 1940, ODFL had three service centers, 45 employees and 12 drivers.

In 1940, the company's drivers were successfully unionized under the Teamsters, this time supported by Earl Sr., at the behest of a large customer. In the 1940s, ODFL switched from a navy blue and red livery for its tractors to the dark green color, which it continued to use throughout its history. The reason for the change was that it had purchased vehicles from International Harvester, which were delivered dark green. Instead of repainting the new trucks to match its older trucks, ODFL chose to repaint the older trucks to match the new ones.

=== Wartime expansion ===
During World War II, ODFL expanded outside Virginia, beginning in 1941 by buying the trucks of New Dixie Transfer and leasing New Dixie's CPCN for a year. This allowed ODFL to operate between Richmond and a number of points in North Carolina and South Carolina. ODFL also received broader authorization to run routes within Virginia and acquired an additional route from the Wilson Trucking Co. in 1942. This was one of three routes Wilson had acquired from former ODFL competitor Hampton Roads Transport Company earlier that year. With a focus on its Virginia operations, especially transporting equipment and supplies for the military to ports, ODFL chose not to renew their lease of New Dixie's CPCN, making them solely a Virginia intrastate operator again.

The company converted a disused lumber mill into a trucking terminal in 1942, to support the volume of business they were doing during the war. This facility also housed the company's offices and its first maintenance shop. Also in 1942, Earl Sr. and Lillian became 50-50 partners in the business officially, though through the late 1940s Lillian stepped back from day-to-day operations as the company hired additional staff. By 1944, the company operated 14 straight trucks, 18 tractors and 25 trailers with 74 employees.

=== Post-war growth ===
ODFL was one of many unionized carriers impacted by a Teamsters strike that lasted over 10 weeks in 1946. Just before the union called the end of the strike, ODFL drivers in Richmond decided to leave the union and return to work. Other ODFL drivers remained unionized. The financial impact of the strike forced the company to lay off many of its office workers and sell off its operating authority for a major route between Richmond and Norfolk to Davidson Transfer and Storage, to maintain enough capital to continue operations.

Following the strike, ODFL was able to recover. By 1947, it was operating 16 straight trucks, 25 tractors and 35 trailers, and it was profitable. The following year, it began a partnership with Globe Freight Airline, Inc. where ODFL distributed airfreight through Virginia.

After Earl Congdon Sr. died in 1950, Lillian Congdon assumed the presidency and was joined by sons Earl Jr. and Jack. In 1957, Old Dominion extended its operations to most major markets in North Carolina and southern Virginia. Five years later, in 1962, the company relocated its headquarters to High Point, North Carolina and merged with Bottoms-Fiske trucking company.

Between 1969 and 1979, the company acquired several competing trucking lines. With the deregulation of the trucking industry in the 1980s, Old Dominion extended its service area into Florida, Tennessee and California and also started serving the major markets of Chicago and Dallas.

In 1991, the company (ticker symbol: ODFL) became a public company via an initial public offering.

On January 24, 2022, ODFL became a Nasdaq-100 company, replacing Peloton Interactive on the index.

David Congdon, grandson of the company's founders, was named president and COO in 1997. Until May 2018, he served as the company's Vice Chairman and CEO. He then succeeded his father Earl Congdon Jr. as executive chairman. Earl moved to the role of senior executive chairman. Greg C. Gantt served as president and CEO until July 1, 2023, when he was succeeded by Marty Freeman as president and CEO.

== Operations ==
Old Dominion operates in 50 U.S. states, Canada and Puerto Rico, with over 23,000 employees as of July 2023. In July 2023, ODFL operated 256 terminals, referred to by the company as "service centers." Corporate headquarters are located in Thomasville, North Carolina, in the Piedmont Triad region.

Old Dominion's core less-than-truckload (LTL) operations are typical of the LTL business model. Customer deliveries and pickups are made during the day, using day cab trucks and smaller trailers, some equipped with liftgates. These "P&D" trucks are driven by local drivers, who return to the service center at the end of the business day. At the service center, these small shipments are consolidated onto smaller "pup"trailers and transported by night-shift "linehaul" drivers to another service center close to the final destination of the freight.

=== Sustainability ===
Old Dominion is part of the U.S. Environmental Protection Agency's SmartWay Transport Partnership, a collaboration between freight shippers, carriers and logistics companies to voluntarily achieve certain environmental standards around fuel efficiency and reduced emissions.
