= Landstar System =

American transportation services company

Landstar System, Inc.
- Type: Public
- Traded as: Nasdaq: LSTR; DJTA component; S&P 400 component
- Industry: Transportation
- Founded: 1968; 58 years ago
- Headquarters: Jacksonville, Florida, United States
- Area served: Worldwide
- Key people: Diana M. Murphy (chairman of the board); Frank Lonegro (president & CEO); Jim Todd (vice president & CFO)
- Services: Delivery; Freight; Third-party logistics
- Revenue: ▲US$3.65 billion (2017)
- Operating income: ▲US$ 243.97 million (2017)
- Net income: ▲US$177.00 million (2017)
- Total assets: ▲US$1.35 billion (2017)
- Total equity: ▲US$653.88 million (2017)
- Number of employees: 1,273 (2017)
- Website: www.landstar.com

Landstar System, Inc. is an American transportation services company specializing in logistics and, more specifically, third-party logistics. Landstar utilizes an extensive network of over 8,800 independent owner-operators, referred to internally as business capacity owners (BCOs), over 1,000 independent freight agents, and over 70,000 vetted carriers. Landstar provides services principally throughout the United States and to a lesser extent in Canada and between the U.S. and Canada, Mexico, and other countries around the world.

== History ==
Landstar has been in business since 1968 and was incorporated in 1991.

In January 2014, Landstar sold its National Logistics Management (NLM) subsidiary to XPO, Inc. for $87m. Using proprietary web-based software to provide management services for customers and carriers, NLM became the largest web-based expediter in North America.

In January 2017, Landstar opened its Landstar U.S./Mexico Logistics Service Center in Laredo, Texas.

== Operations ==
Landstar System is based in Jacksonville, Florida. The company includes over 8,800 owner-operators in the United States, Canada and Mexico. The business capacity operators (BCOs) are not forced to dispatch like traditional trucking companies. Rather, they can choose their own loads. Landstar has agents in the United States and Canada.
