= Edison International =

American public utility holding company

- Company type: Public
- Traded as: NYSE: EIX; DJUA component; S&P 500 component
- Industry: Public Utility
- Founded: 1886; 140 years ago
- Headquarters: Rosemead, California, U.S.
- Key people: Pedro J. Pizarro (President and CEO)
- Products: electricity, energy solutions
- Revenue: ▼US$16.338 billion (2023); US$17.220 billion (2022)
- Operating income: ▲US$2.627 billion (2023); US$1.483 billion (2022)
- Net income: ▲US$1.407 billion (2023); US$824 million (2022)
- Total assets: ▲US$81.758 billion (2023); US$78.041 billion (2022)
- Number of employees: ▲14,375 (2023); 13,388 (2022)
- Subsidiaries: S.California Edison (SCE); Edison Energy
- Website: edison.com

Edison International is a public utility holding company based in Rosemead, California. Its subsidiaries include Southern California Edison, and unregulated non-utility business assets Edison Energy. Edison's roots trace back to Holt & Knupps, a company founded in 1886 as a provider of street lights in Visalia, California.

== History ==
The company was first incorporated in 1909 as Southern California Edison Company after Southern California acquired the assets of Edison Electric Company; it was known as Southern California Edison until 1996, when it adopted its current name in recognition of its growing business abroad and in other industry sectors. Edison first became a holding company in 1988 when it made a small change to its original name, becoming known as SCEcorp.

Edison International acquired the naming rights for the Anaheim Angels' stadium (previously known as Anaheim Stadium) in 1998, in a deal running for 20 years. The company backed out of the naming rights deal after the 2003 season, and the stadium is now called Angel Stadium.

In 2001, Edison's main holding, Southern California Edison, faced bankruptcy after a state senate bill regarding financial assistance came up short by $1 billion.
