= Kirby Corporation =

American tank barge operator

- Type: Public
- Traded as: NYSE: KEX; DJTA component; S&P 400 component
- Industry: Maritime
- Predecessor: Kirby Industries, Inc. Kirby Exploration Company, Inc.
- Founded: January 31, 1969; 57 years ago
- Founder: John Henry Kirby
- Headquarters: Houston, Texas, U.S.
- Key people: Joseph H. Pyne (Chairman of the Board); David W. Grzebinski (President & CEO); William G. Harvey (Vice President & CFO)
- Revenue: ▲US$3.27 billion (2024)
- Operating income: ▲US$399 million (2024)
- Net income: ▲US$287 million (2024)
- Total assets: ▲US$5.85 billion (2024)
- Total equity: ▲US$3.35 billion (2024)
- Number of employees: 5,414 (2024)
- Website: kirbycorp.com

Kirby Corporation is an American company headquartered in Houston, Texas. It is the largest liquid cargo barge operator in the United States, transporting bulk liquid products by boat. Kirby operates throughout the Mississippi River system, on the Gulf Intracoastal Waterway, along all three American coasts, and in Alaska and Hawaii. Products transported by Kirby include petrochemicals, black oil, refined petroleum products, and agricultural chemical products by tank barge. Kirby also owns and operates eight ocean-going barge and tug units transporting dry-bulk commodities in American coastal trade.

Through its diesel engine services segment, Kirby is an after-market service provider for medium- and high-speed diesel engines, reduction gears, and ancillary products for marine and power generation applications. Kirby also serves as a distributor and service provider for high-speed diesel engines, transmissions, pumps and compression products, and manufactures and refurbishes oilfield service equipment, including pressure pumping units, for the land-based pressure pumping and oilfield service markets.

Kirby Inland Marine operates the nation's largest fleet of inland tank barges and towing vessels.

Kirby's service area spans America's inland waterway network, including the Gulf Intracoastal Waterway, the Mississippi River system, the Illinois River, the Ohio River and other waterways. It operates 884 active inland tank barges, 251 active towing vessels and five fleets.

== History ==
The corporate predecessor, Kirby Industries, Inc., was founded in 1921. The Kirby Corporation was founded in 1969 as a subsidiary of that company called Kirby Exploration Company, Inc., and was spun off in 1976. The company changed its name in 1990.

== Management ==
=== Board of Directors ===
Per Kirby Corporation documents from 2020:

- Richard J. Alario - Chairman of the board
- David W. Grzebinski - President and CEO
- Anne-Marie N. Ainsworth
- C. Sean Day
- Tanya S. Beder
- Barry E. Davis
- Monte J. Miller
- Joseph H. Pyne, Chairman
- Richard R. Stewart
- William M. Waterman

=== Corporate Officers ===
Per Kirby Corporation documents from 2020:

- David W. Grzebinski - President and chief executive officer
- Raj Kumar - Executive Vice President and Chief Financial Officer
- Christian G. O’Neil - President – Kirby Inland Marine, LP and Kirby Offshore Marine, LLC
- Joseph H. Reniers - President – Kirby Distribution & Services, Inc.
- Kim B. Clarke - Vice President and Chief Human Resource Officer
- Ronald A. Dragg - Vice President, Controller and Assistant Secretary
- Eric S. Holcomb - Vice President – Investor Relations
- Amy D. Husted - Vice President, General Counsel and Secretary
- Scott P. Miller - Vice President and Chief Information Officer
- Kurt A. Niemietz - Vice President and Treasurer
- William Matthew Woodruff - Vice President – Public and Governmental Affairs

== Subsidiaries ==
The company has a number of subsidiaries:

Marine Transportation

- Kirby Offshore Marine, LLC
- Kirby Ocean Transport Company
- Osprey Line, LLC
- San Jac Marine, LLC
- Kirby Inland Marine, LP
- Penn Maritime

Distribution and Services

- United Holdings LLC
- Stewart & Stevenson LLC
- Stewart & Stevenson Power Products LLC
- Stewart & Stevenson Manufacturing Technologies LLC
- Stewart & Stevenson de las Americas Colombia, Ltda
- Marine Systems, Inc
- Engine Systems, Inc
- United Engines, LLC
- UE Manufacturing, LLC
- Thermo King of Houston, LP
- Thermo King of Dallas, LP

Other

- Kirby Corporate Services, LLC
- Kirby Terminals, Inc.
- Kirby Logistics Management
- Kirby Tankships, Inc.
- KIM Holdings, Inc.
- Sabine Transportation Company
- AFRAM Carriers, Inc.
- K Equipment, LLC
