= Charles Dow =

American journalist (1851–1902)

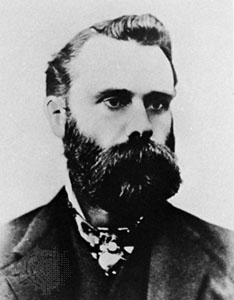
- Born: Charles Henry Dow; November 6, 1851; Sterling, Connecticut, U.S.
- Died: December 4, 1902 (aged 51); Brooklyn, New York, U.S.
- Resting place: North Burial Ground; Providence, Rhode Island, U.S.
- Occupation: Journalist

Charles Henry Dow (/daʊ/; November 6, 1851 – December 4, 1902) was an American journalist who co-founded Dow Jones & Company with Edward Jones and Charles Bergstresser.

Dow also co-founded The Wall Street Journal, which has become one of the most respected financial publications in the world. He also invented the Dow Jones Industrial Average as part of his research into market movements. He developed a series of principles for understanding and analyzing market behavior which later became known as Dow theory, the groundwork for technical analysis.

== Working on Wall Street ==
Simultaneously to his work in publishing, in 1885 Dow also served as a Partner in the NYSE brokerage house of Goodbody, Glynn and Dow where he remained until its dissolution six years later. His Partner, Robert Goodbody, was an Irish citizen and thus at that time ineligible to own a seat. By 1891, both men would part ways. Robert would start his own firm entitled Robert Goodbody & Co, which would become the fifth largest brokerage firm in the United States, before being bought by Merrill Lynch in 1971.

== Dow Jones Averages ==
The stock price average was created on July 3, 1884, by Charles Dow as part of the "Customer's Afternoon Letter". At its inception, it consisted of 11 companies—9 railroads and 2 non-rail companies, Pacific Mail Steamship and Western Union Telegraph. On September 23, 1889, the "20 Active Stock" index was introduced. It included 18 railroad and 2 non-rail stocks.

Nowadays, the DJIA remains one of the oldest and popular stock indices in the world.

On October 25, 1896, Dow replaced the 2 non-rail stocks in the "20 Active Stock" index with 2 rail stocks and the index became the Dow Jones Railroad Average (DJRA). The DJRA remained a rail average of 20 stocks until January 2, 1970, when the average was changed to the Dow Jones Transportation Average (DJTA)—9 railroad stocks were replaced by 9 airline and trucking stocks.

== Theory of stock price movements ==
In 1899, Dow started an editorial column in his newspaper in order to educate the general reader until his death in 1902. The column dealt mainly with stock market activities and economic matters. It was in this column that he often put forward his ideas of stock price movements, which were the foundation of what was later called the Dow Theory. Unfortunately, his complete editorial writings are not available to the general reader. However, most of his writings can be found in the following books:

1. Samuel Armstrong Nelson, The ABC of stock speculation 'The A B C of Stock Speculation', 1902
2. George W. Bishop, Charles H. Dow and The Dow Theory, 1960
3. Laura Sether ed., Dow Theory Unplugged: Charles Dow's Original Editorials & Their Relevance Today, 2009

The basic idea of Dow is that the stock price is affected by various factors interacting at the same time, leading to distinct patterns of stock price movement. The first step is to establish from past data the relationship between these patterns and each important factor. Thereafter, by identifying the main factors which are presently working, we can predict the probable future movement of stock price. One of the most important contributions to stock market thought was his theory of the three movements in the market.

== Personal life and death ==
At age 30, having moved to New York City the prior year to accept a job offer, Dow married his wife Lucy, who had a daughter from a previous marriage. The couple had no children of their own. He died on December 4, 1902 in Brooklyn, New York.

== See also ==
- Dow Jones Indexes
- William Peter Hamilton
