= Dow Jones Utility Average =

Stock market index

The Dow Jones Utility Average (DJUA, also known as the "Dow Jones Utilities") is a stock index from S&P Dow Jones Indices that tracks the performance of 15 prominent utility companies traded in the United States.

The Dow Jones Utilities is a price-weighted average. All components of the DJUA are listed on the New York Stock Exchange, with the exception of American Electric Power, Exelon, and Xcel Energy, which are listed on Nasdaq.

== Components ==
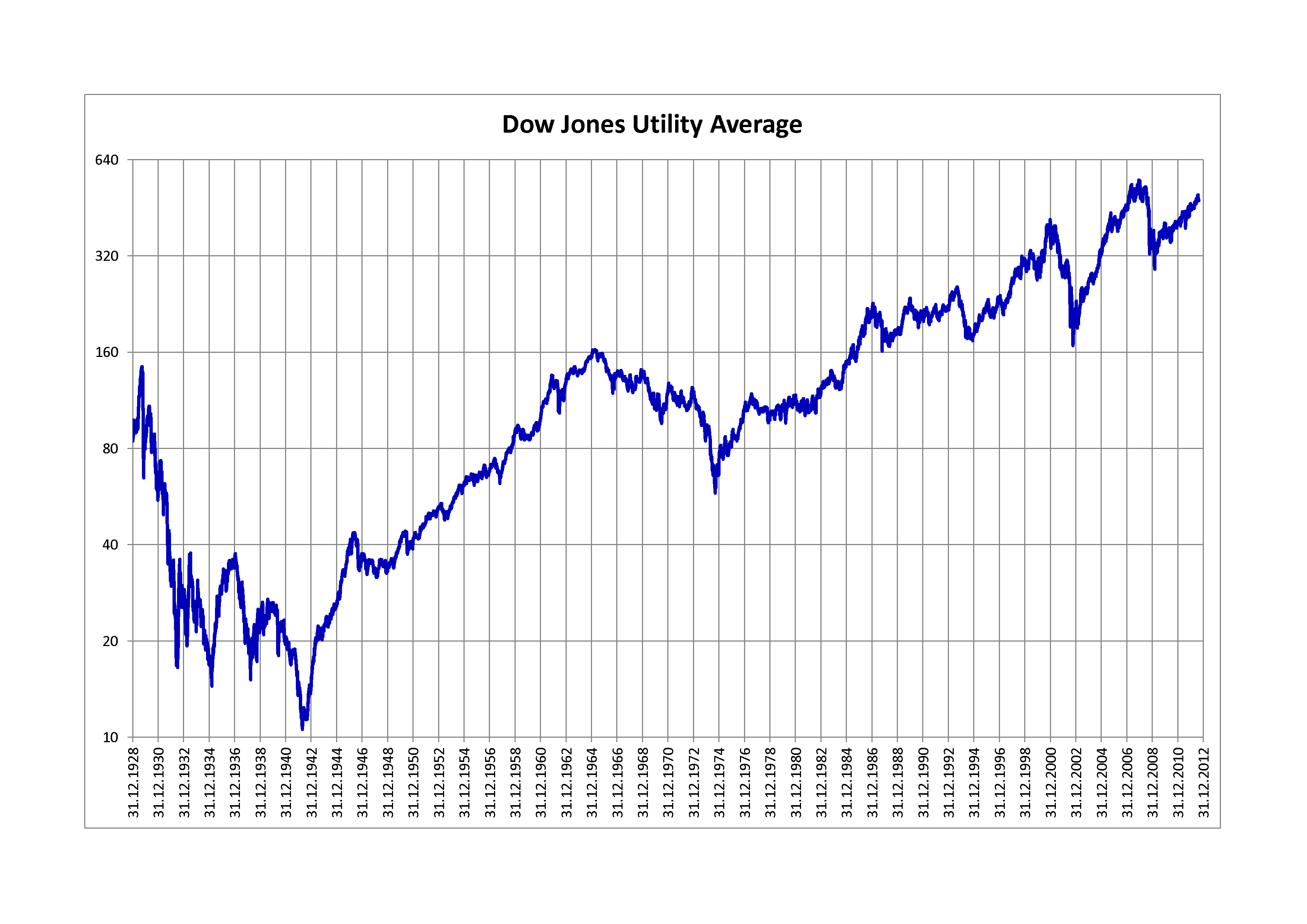
Dow Jones Utility Average 1928–2012

As of November 8, 2024, the current components on the Dow Jones Utilities are as follows (company name followed by ticker symbol):

DJUA component companies, showing ticker symbols and utility types
Company	Ticker	Type
American Electric Power	AEP	electric utilities
American Water Works	AWK	water utilities
Atmos Energy	ATO	gas utilities
Consolidated Edison	ED	electric utilities
Dominion Energy	D	electric utilities
Duke Energy	DUK	electric utilities
Edison International	EIX	electric utilities
Exelon	EXC	diversified utilities
FirstEnergy	FE	electric utilities
NextEra Energy	NEE	electric utilities
Public Service Enterprise Group	PEG	diversified utilities
Sempra	SRE	multi-utilities
Southern Company	SO	electric utilities
Vistra Corp.	VST	independent power producer
Xcel Energy	XEL	electric utilities

== Former components ==
Effective October 1, 2014, American Water Works replaced Williams Companies.

Effective January 18, 2019, Sempra Energy replaced PG&E Corporation.

Effective October 27, 2020, Atmos Energy and Xcel Energy replaced CenterPoint Energy and NiSource, respectively.

Effective November 8, 2024, Vistra Corp. replaced AES Corporation.

== History ==
The index was created in 1929 when all utility stocks were removed from the Dow Jones Industrial Average.

On April 20, 1965, the index closed at 163.32. On September 13, 1974, the index closed at 57.93.

== Annual returns ==
The following table shows the price return of the Dow Jones Utility Average, which was calculated back to 1928.

End-of-year closing values for DJUA, sortable
Year	Closing value	Change in points	Change in percent
1928	85.64		
1929	88.27	2.63	3.07
1930	60.80	−27.47	−31.12
1931	31.41	−29.39	−48.34
1932	27.71	−3.70	−11.78
1933	23.09	−4.62	−16.67
1934	17.80	−5.29	−22.91
1935	29.55	11.75	66.01
1936	34.83	5.28	17.87
1937	20.35	−14.48	−41.57
1938	22.73	2.38	11.70
1939	25.32	2.59	11.39
1940	19.85	−5.47	−21.60
1941	14.02	−5.83	−29.37
1942	14.54	0.52	3.71
1943	21.87	7.33	50.41
1944	26.26	4.39	20.07
1945	38.13	11.87	45.20
1946	37.27	−0.86	−2.26
1947	33.40	−3.87	−10.38
1948	33.55	0.15	0.45
1949	41.31	7.76	23.13
1950	41.04	−0.27	−0.65
1951	47.22	6.18	15.06
1952	52.60	5.38	11.39
1953	52.04	−0.56	−1.06
1954	62.47	10.43	20.04
1955	64.16	1.69	2.71
1956	68.54	4.38	6.83
1957	68.58	0.04	0.06
1958	91.00	22.42	32.69
1959	87.83	−3.17	−3.48
1960	100.02	12.19	13.88
1961	129.16	29.14	29.13
1962	129.23	0.07	0.05
1963	138.99	9.76	7.55
1964	155.17	16.18	11.64
1965	152.63	−2.54	−1.64
1966	136.18	−16.45	−10.78
1967	127.91	−8.27	−6.07
1968	137.17	9.26	7.24
1969	110.08	−27.09	−19.75
1970	121.84	11.76	10.68
1971	117.75	−4.09	−3.36
1972	119.50	1.75	1.49
1973	89.37	−30.13	−25.21
1974	68.76	−20.61	−23.06
1975	83.65	14.89	21.66
1976	108.38	24.73	29.56
1977	111.28	2.90	2.68
1978	98.24	−13.04	−11.72
1979	106.60	8.36	8.51
1980	114.42	7.82	7.34
1981	109.02	−5.40	−4.72
1982	119.46	10.44	9.58
1983	131.84	12.38	10.36
1984	149.52	17.68	13.41
1985	174.81	25.29	16.91
1986	206.01	31.20	17.85
1987	175.08	−30.93	−15.01
1988	186.28	11.20	6.40
1989	235.04	48.76	26.18
1990	209.70	−25.34	−10.78
1991	226.15	16.45	7.84
1992	221.02	−5.13	−2.27
1993	229.30	8.28	3.75
1994	181.52	−47.78	−20.84
1995	225.40	43.88	24.17
1996	232.53	7.13	3.16
1997	273.07	40.54	17.43
1998	312.30	39.23	14.37
1999	283.36	−28.94	−9.27
2000	412.16	128.80	45.45
2001	293.94	−118.22	−28.68
2002	215.18	−78.76	−26.79
2003	266.90	51.72	24.04
2004	334.95	68.05	25.50
2005	405.11	70.16	20.95
2006	456.77	51.66	12.75
2007	532.53	75.76	16.59
2008	370.76	−161.77	−30.38
2009	398.01	27.25	7.35
2010	404.99	6.98	1.75
2011	464.68	59.69	14.74
2012	453.09	−11.59	−2.49
2013	490.57	37.48	8.27
2014	618.08	127.51	25.99
2015	577.82	−40.26	−6.51
2016	659.61	81.79	14.15
2017	723.37	63.76	9.67
2018	712.93	−10.44	−1.44
2019	879.17	166.24	23.32
2020	864.64	−14.53	−1.65
2021	980.78	116.14	13.43
2022	967.40	−13.38	−1.36
2023	881.67	−85.73	−8.86
2024	982.74	101.07	11.46
2025	1,068.07	85.33	8.68

== Record values ==
Category	All-time highs	
Closing	1,190.23	Friday, February 27, 2026
Intraday	1,202.79	Thursday, April 9, 2026

== Investing ==
There is no fund that tracks this index. There are funds that have very similar behavior, such as Utilities Select Sector SPDR (NYSE Arca: XLU).

== See also ==
- Dow Jones Composite Average
