= Charles Bergstresser =

American publisher and journalist (1858–1923)

Charles Milford Bergstresser (June 25, 1858 – September 20, 1923) was an American journalist and, with Charles Dow and Edward Jones, one of the founders of Dow Jones & Company at 15 Wall Street in 1882.

== Early life ==
A native of Berrysburg, Pennsylvania, Bergstresser was born on June 25, 1858. Bergstresser graduated from Lafayette College, where he took a scientific course and Latin, in 1881. After graduation, he took a job with the Kiernan News Agency, but he was not satisfied with his employment, particularly when the Agency refused to give equity interest in a stylus that he had invented which would allow information to be inscribed in 35 bulletins at once. Dow and Jones were co-workers there, and Bergstresser convinced the pair to join him in departing from Kiernan to form their own company in November 1882.

== Dow Jones ==
Although he was the chief financier of the fledgling company, Bergstresser chose to be a silent partner of Dow and Jones, using money he had saved while in college to fund their company. He worked for the new company, which was located in the basement of 15 Wall Street, near the New York Stock Exchange, as a reporter. It was he who came up with the name The Wall Street Journal.

== Later life ==
He retired as a journalist in 1903. He died on Thursday, September 20, 1923, survived by his daughter Mrs. Ethel B. Stewart McCoy.
