= MarketWatch =

American financial information website

- Website type: Financial Information
- Headquarters: New York City
- Owner: Dow Jones & Company
- Editor: Mark DeCambre
- Website: www.marketwatch.com
- Launched: October 30, 1997; 28 years ago
- Current status: Online

MarketWatch is a website that provides financial information, business news, analysis, and stock market data. It is a subsidiary of Dow Jones & Company, a property of News Corp, along with The Wall Street Journal and Barron's.

== History ==
The company was conceived as DBC Online by Data Broadcasting Corporation in the fall of 1995. The marketwatch.com domain name was registered on July 30, 1997. The website launched on October 30, 1997, as a 50/50 joint venture between DBC and CBS News, then run by Larry Kramer and co-founder and chairman, Derek Reisfield. Thom Calandra was its first editor-in-chief.

In 1999, the company hired David Callaway and in 2003, Callaway became editor-in-chief. In January 1999, during the dot-com bubble, the company became a public company via an initial public offering. After pricing at $17 per share, the stock traded as high as $130 per share on its first day of trading, giving it a market capitalization of over $1 billion despite only $7 million in annual revenues. In June 2000, the company formed a joint venture with the Financial Times with Peter Bale as managing editor.

In January 2004, Calandra resigned amidst allegations of insider trading. In January 2005, Dow Jones & Company acquired the company for $528 million, or $18 per share.

In May 2016, MarketWatch hired Dan Shar as general manager. In October 2020, MarketWatch announced that it would become a paywalled subscription-based publication, in order to "raise the ambitions of our journalism". Mark DeCambre was named editor in chief on March 21, 2022.

== See also ==
- CBS MoneyWatch, CBS News's replacement for MarketWatch
- List of assets owned by News Corp
- List of financial market information services
- Money (financial website)
