= Edward Jones (statistician) =

American statistician, Dow Jones co-founder

Edward Davis Jones
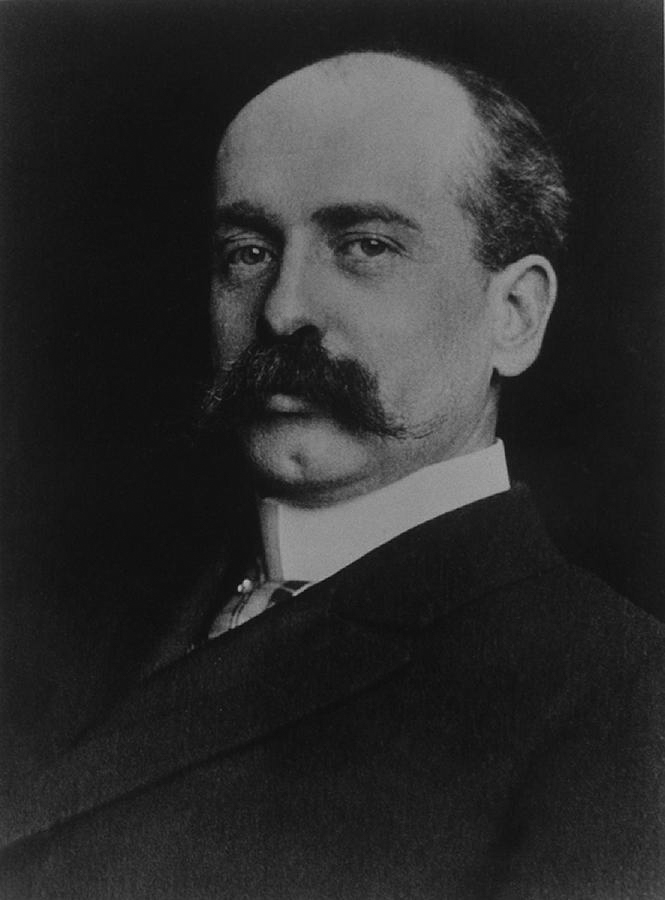
- Born: October 7, 1856; Worcester, Massachusetts, U.S.
- Died: February 16, 1920 (aged 63); New York City, U.S.
- Resting place: Hope Cemetery Worcester, Massachusetts, U.S.
- Education: Brown University
- Occupations: Statistician, Journalist

Edward Davis Jones (October 7, 1856 – February 16, 1920) was an American statistician and journalist. Jones is best known as the "Jones" in the Dow Jones Industrial Average and as a co-founder of The Wall Street Journal.

== Early life ==
Jones was born on October 7, 1856, in Worcester, Massachusetts. Jones' parents, Reverend John Jones and Clarissa (née Day) Jones, were of Welsh descent. Jones graduated from Worcester Academy and attended Brown University before dropping out in his junior year. After leaving Brown, Jones worked as a reporter for the Providence Morning Star and Evening Press, where he met Charles Dow.

== Dow Jones ==
The company which is famous for the Dow Jones Industrial Average, The Wall Street Journal was founded by Jones and Charles Dow in 1882 "in the basement of the New York Stock Exchange"; Charles Bergstresser was a silent partner.

Jones had met Dow while both had worked as fellow reporters in Providence, Rhode Island. He died in New York in 1920 at the age of 63.
