= Wall Street Journal criminal charges, trial and conviction for anti-union activity =

Hong Kong journalist Selina Cheng faced demands from her managers at the Wall Street Journal to withdraw her candidacy for the leadership of the Hong Kong Journalists Association in 2024. After winning the election, she was fired. Cheng launched a private prosecution under the legal system of Hong Kong. In 2026, the Eastern Magistrates' Courts found her employer guilty of the first charge of deterring Cheng from exercising her union participation rights. The court acquitted the company on the second charge of terminating Cheng's employment over her union role.

== History ==
=== Background ===
Press freedom in Hong Kong has plummeted since 2019. Trade unions have been facing government crackdowns. Hong Kong Journalists Association, the press union affiliated with the International Federation of Journalists, faced a 'climate of fear' with employers preventing journalist participation. The right to stand for election and participate in a union without employer consent are established under Hong Kong employment law.

=== Events ===
In June 2024 Wall Street Journal editors learned that WSJ journalist Selina Cheng was a candidate for the leadership of the Hong Kong Journalists Association. Cheng did not withdraw and was elected to the leadership role. In July 2024, the paper's chief editor Gordon Fairclough travelled to Hong Kong and fired her from her role at the WSJ. Later that day, Cheng gave a press conference disclosing the events.

The WSJ declined to comment on Cheng's case except to acknowledge there had been "restructuring". Cheng would later write that the restructuring was a layoff of one person and that the Wall Street Journal had fired her to avoid being seen as advocating press freedom in the city.

Cheng would meet with government investigators “to pursue this as a criminal matter."

=== Reception ===
The paper's action against Cheng attracted criticism from media organisations, press unions and human rights proponents across the globe.

Chinese state media, meanwhile, celebrated her sacking, with the Global Times, a tabloid owned by the Chinese Communist Party, calling the press union "a malignant tumour that harms the city's safety and security". Asked by the South China Morning Post about his views about the reason for the dismissal, Hong Kong's security minister Chris Tang mentioned what he saw as the possibility that the journal might have wanted not to be associated with the press union, the latter being in his view "not a well-recognized association".

In July 2024, the NewsGuild-CWA and Independent Association of Publishers' Employees, the union for Dow Jones, expressed their support for Cheng. The latter launched a petition calling on WSJ to reinstate Cheng, which has garnered 335 employee signatures in support. Maya Wang of Human Rights Watch said the Journal had sent the message that Western media can be intimidated and bullied by authoritarian governments.

Hong Kong centrist lawmaker Tik Chi-yuen criticized the Wall Street Journal for self-censorship and fear of offending the authorities, which seriously impacts press freedom in Hong Kong. Ben Lam, a former Mong Kok East politician residing in the UK, described WSJ's actions as supporting authoritarianism and compared their chief editor to Walter Duranty.

=== Government Investigation and decision not to Prosecute ===
In November 2024, Cheng filed a complaint with Hong Kong's Labour Department, which investigated, consulted with the Department of Justice and ultimately declined to prosecute.

=== Trial ===
Cheng v. Dow Jones
- Court: Eastern Magistrates’ Court
- Full case name: Cheng Kar Yue, Selina v. Dow Jones Publishing Co. (Asia) Inc.
- Started: February 14, 2025
- Decided: September 10, 2026
- Docket nos.: ESS 35334 & 35335 / 2024
- Verdict: Guilty 35334, Not Guilty 35335

Court membership
- Judge sitting: David Cheung Chi-Wai

Keywords
- Employment_discrimination , Trade Unionism, Private Prosecution

Hong Kong retains the common law right for individuals to see the law enforced by launching private prosecution. In February 2025, Cheng launched her landmark private prosecution against Dow Jones Publishing Co (Asia) Inc. at the Eastern Magistrates' Courts. The company faced two charges under Hong Kong's Employment Ordinance: one count of terminating employment for exercising the right to be an officer of a trade union, and one count of preventing or deterring an employee from exercising their right to become an officer of a trade union.

In June the Hong Kong Department of Justice announced it had completed its review and would not intervene, allowing the case to proceed to trial.

At trial, Dow Jones pleaded not guilty to both charges, each imposing a criminal record and carrying a maximum fine of HK$100,000.

Cheng was represented by Senior Counsel Nigel Kat and barrister Nicklaus Pannu-Yuon, with solicitor Adam Paul Clermont as instructing solicitor. Dow Jones was represented by Senior Counsel Benson Tsoi. The trial was heard before Principal Magistrate David Cheung over twelve days.

During the trial, Cheng testified that her supervisor had told her that her participation in the Hong Kong Journalists Association election was "problematic" and that the matter needed to be discussed with Wall Street Journal management in New York and Dow Jones in-house lawyers. The court heard that a Dow Jones human resources director had informed Cheng by email that she "did not seek, and will not receive the company's approval" to pursue the HKJA chair role. The defence argued that the prosecution had not proven the individuals involved acted as the "directing mind and will" of the company, contending that any offence, if proven, would lie against the individuals rather than the corporate entity. Dow Jones also accused Cheng of abusing the criminal process and acting in bad faith, pointing to emails showing she had demanded HK$3 million as settlement or reinstatement with a formal apology. Cheng denied that financial compensation was her primary motivation, stating she wanted to hold employers accountable for violations of the law.

=== Verdicts ===
On 10 September 2026, Principal Magistrate David Cheung convicted Dow Jones of the first charge of deterring Cheng from exercising her union participation rights. The court acquitted the company on the second charge of terminating Cheng's employment over her union role, with the magistrate finding that the defence had raised sufficient reasonable doubt, as the possibility that the company dismissed Cheng as part of a genuine corporate restructuring could not be ruled out beyond a reasonable doubt.

In a 100-page judgement, the court gave reasons for refusing the defence's application to suspend proceedings, and dismissed their claim that the prosecution was influenced by ulterior motives.

Speaking to reporters after the hearing, Cheng said her case had brought awareness of union suppression in Hong Kong and that employers had no right to require employees to consult them before joining a union.

=== Sentencing ===
Sentencing is expected at a later date. The Wall Street Journal faces a maximum fine of HK$100,000. Dow Jones did not immediately respond to a request for comment following the verdict.
