= Lucky duckies =

Idiom describing people too poor to owe income tax

Lucky duckies is a term that was used in Wall Street Journal editorials starting on 20 November 2002 to refer to Americans who pay no federal income tax because they are at an income level that is below the tax line (after deductions and credits). The term has outlived its original use to become a part of the informal terminology used in the tax reform and income inequality debates in the United States.

The term's meaning has split depending on political persuasion. For many conservatives, the term has become part of a political theory that the US is developing an increasingly large 'moocher' class who depend on government benefits paid for by taxes from richer or harder-working citizens, pay no taxes themselves and vote themselves higher benefits paid for from the taxes of others. This has led prominent conservative politicians such as Rick Perry and Michele Bachmann to propose that poorer citizens should have their taxes increased to make them more aware of the problems of excessive taxation and big government. 2012 Republican presidential candidate Mitt Romney commented that "There are 47 percent of the people who will vote liberal no matter what... believe that they are entitled to health care, to food, to housing, to you-name-it. That's an entitlement. The government should give it to them. And they will vote for this president no matter what... 47% of Americans pay no income tax. So our message of low taxes doesn't connect... I'll never convince them they should take personal responsibility and care for their lives." Perry, announcing his presidential campaign, commented "Spreading the wealth punishes success... we're dismayed at the injustice that nearly half of all Americans don't even pay any income tax."

The term was, meanwhile, immediately criticized by liberals and some conservatives for suggesting that people are 'lucky' to be so poor that they are not eligible to pay tax. It has also been used to suggest that the WSJ and, by proxy, conservatives lack real awareness of poverty or intend to raise taxes on poor people for the benefit of richer taxpayers, a suggestion that has been described as 'reverse class warfare'. It has also been argued that as many red states are particularly poor, many individuals who pay no income tax are in fact generally conservative voters, while many rich residents of blue states consistently vote liberal.

== Original argument ==
The Journal defined the term in this way:

Who are these lucky duckies? They are the beneficiaries of tax policies that have expanded the personal exemption and standard deduction and targeted certain voter groups by introducing a welter of tax credits for things like child care and education. When these escape hatches are figured against income, the result is either a zero liability or a liability that represents a tiny percentage of income.

The worry of the Journal's editorialist was that "as fewer and fewer people are responsible for paying more and more of all taxes, the constituency for tax cutting, much less for tax reform, is eroding. Workers who pay little or no taxes can hardly be expected to care about tax relief for everybody else. They are also that much more detached from recognizing the costs of government."

For example, according to the editorial:

Say a person earns $12,000. After subtracting the personal exemption, the standard deduction and assuming no tax credits, then applying the 10% rate of the lowest bracket, the person ends up paying a little less than 4% of income in taxes. It ain't peanuts, but not enough to get his or her blood boiling with tax rage.

The Journal published three articles using the phrase "lucky duckies": "The Non-Taxpaying Class", the original article, on 20 November 2002; "Lucky Duckies Again" (20 January 2003); and "Even Luckier Duckies" (3 June 2003).

== Expansion and limits of the original argument ==
In recent years, the number and percentage of Americans who pay no federal income tax has increased. According to a 2007 report by the Statistics of Income division of the Internal Revenue Service, in 2006 the Internal Revenue Service received 134,372,678 individual income tax returns, of which 90,593,081 (67.42%) showed that they paid or owed federal income tax for 2005. That is, 32.58% of those Americans who filed income tax returns did not owe any federal income tax at all for 2005. This percentage increased substantially in 2008, and for 2009 was 47%.

The federal income tax is only one of several taxes Americans pay. Americans who pay zero federal income taxes do pay other taxes, such as payroll taxes (a.k.a. FICA), excise taxes, sales taxes, gift taxes, unemployment taxes, state income taxes, property taxes, and self-employment taxes.

Federal payroll taxes are imposed on nearly every American with income from employment (there are exceptions for certain students, certain religious objectors, and certain state/local government employees who participate in a state/local pension). Federal self-employment taxes are imposed on nearly every American with net income from self-employment above $400 (again with exceptions for certain religious objectors). So almost all Americans with some earned income do pay some federal taxes. However, the US also allows earned income tax credits to certain individuals, which can lower their income taxes below zero. When these refundable tax credits equal or exceed other federal taxes, the individual is said to pay "no net federal taxes."

As of 2006, according to New York Times columnist David Leonhardt, approximately 10% of Americans paid no net federal taxes. Leonhardt did not have figures for 2010, and there were several refundable tax credits which were created or expanded between 2006 and 2010.

According to Congressional Budget Office estimates, the lowest earning 20% of Americans (24.1 million households earning an average of $15,900 in 2005) paid an "effective" federal tax rate of 3.9%, when taking into account income tax, social insurance tax, and excise tax. For comparison, the same study found that the highest earning 1% of Americans (1.1 million households earning an average of $1,558,500 in 2005) paid an "effective" federal tax rate of 21.9%, when including the same three types of taxes.

In 2011, British financial journalist Ian Cowie argued that people who do not earn enough to pay tax should be stripped of the right to vote as they should not have the right to control how others' money is taxed and spent: "Their contribution is not just negative in financial terms – they take out more than they put in – but likely to be damaging to the decisions taken by democracies." His colleague Benedict Brogan described the idea as 'intriguing' and 'worth checking out'.

== Precedents ==
In 2001, U.S. Representative Jim DeMint (R-S.C.) told The New Yorker:

I think we've got a major crisis in democracy ... We assume that voters will restrain the growth of government because it becomes burdensome to them personally. But today fewer and fewer people pay taxes, and more and more are dependent on government, so the politician who promises the most from government is likely to win. Every day, the Republican Party is losing constituents, because every day more people can vote themselves more benefits without paying for it. The tax code will destroy democracy, by putting us in a position where most voters don't pay for government.

== Criticism ==
=== From liberals ===
The Journal was frequently mocked for its use of the term "lucky duckies" to refer to people whose lack of a federal income tax burden is the direct result of their lower income. This attitude was satirized as "let them eat cake"-style myopia.

Ruben Bolling's Tom the Dancing Bug comic in Salon magazine, for instance, periodically features a poor duck who keeps "outwitting" a fat, top-hatted oligarch by cleverly submitting to the misfortunes of his economic class.

Jonathan Chait, in The New Republic, reacted to the Journal editorial by writing:

One of the things that has fascinated me about The Wall Street Journal editorial page is its occasional capacity to rise above the routine moral callousness of hack conservative punditry and attain a level of exquisite depravity normally reserved for villains in James Bond movies.

And one "lucky ducky" wrote to the Journal editor, offering to share his luck (in a form of logical argument sometimes known as a modest proposal):

I will spend a year as a Wall Street Journal editor, while one lucky editor will spend a year in my underpaid shoes. I will receive an editor's salary, and suffer the outrage of paying federal income tax on that salary. The fortunate editor, on the other hand, will enjoy a relatively small federal income tax burden, as well as these other perks of near poverty: the gustatory delights of a diet rich in black beans, pinto beans, navy beans, chickpeas and, for a little variety, lentils; the thrill of scrambling to pay the rent or make the mortgage; the salutary effects of having no paid sick days; the slow satisfaction of saving up for months for a trip to the dentist; and the civic pride of knowing that, even as a lucky ducky, you still pay a third or more of your gross income in income taxes, payroll taxes, sales taxes and property taxes.

=== From conservatives ===
Conservatives have also criticized the argument. Writing in 2011, Ramesh Ponnuru commented that "conservatives should seek to remedy the problem by cutting benefits rather than by raising taxes in the hope it will make people more eager to cut benefits. To seek to raise taxes on poor and middle-class people would be a terrible mistake. The idea is bound to be unpopular. And it would alter the character of conservatism for the worse [into a] creed openly focused on helping one group at the expense of another, a kind of mirror image of egalitarian liberalism".

Writer W. James Antle said of the thresholds enabling poorer individuals to pay no income tax: "Conservatives supported all of these policies ... [and the poor] are not exactly 'lucky duckies' ... it seems to me that a conservative vision of personal responsibility would entail having people living on subsistence-level incomes support themselves and their families before they support the government."

== See also ==
- Taxation in the United States
- Working poor
