= Tom the Dancing Bug =

Comic strip

- Author: Ruben Bolling
- Website: https://www.gocomics.com/tomthedancingbug
- Current status/schedule: Weekly
- Launch date: June 8, 1990; 36 years ago (on New York Perspectives)
- Alternate name: Super Fun-Pak Comix (1990-1991)
- Syndicate(s): Quaternary Features (1990–1997); Universal Press Syndicate/Universal Uclick/Andrews McMeel Syndication (1997–present)
- Publisher(s): HarperPerennial, NBM Publishing, Andrews McMeel Publishing
- Genre(s): Humor, comedy political humor, satire, absurdist humour, postmodernist comedy

Tom the Dancing Bug is a weekly satirical comic strip by cartoonist and political commentator Ruben Bolling that covers mostly US current events from a liberal point of view. Tom the Dancing Bug won the 2002, 2003, 2007, 2008, and 2009 Association of Alternative Newsweeklies Awards for Best Cartoon. The strip was awarded the 2010 Sigma Delta Chi Award for editorial cartooning by the Society of Professional Journalists and best cartoon in the 2018 Robert F. Kennedy Book & Journalism Awards. His work on the strip won Bolling the 2017 Herblock Prize and the 2021 Berryman Award for Editorial Cartoons, and he was a finalist in the Editorial Cartooning category for the 2019 and 2021 Pulitzer Prize.

== Publication history ==
The strip, originally titled Super Fun-Pak Comix, first appeared in New York Perspectives on June 8, 1990. It began running under its current name on May 31, 1991. Bolling recounted in an interview:

I started Tom the Dancing Bug in 1990 in a small New York newspaper. It was called New York Perspectives, then it was called New York Weekly, then it was called "bankrupt." But before it went bankrupt, I was able to sell the strip to a few other papers. For seven years, I was sending packages out and following up with phone calls, trying to get editors to run the strip. I ended up selling it to about 60 newspapers [under the name Quaternary Features]. I was surprised at the success I had, especially in selling to daily newspapers. I didn't think it would be my market. In 1997, the Universal Press Syndicate approached me and asked if we could work together. That came at just the right time, as I was starting a more serious day job, and I was about to have my first baby. I just didn't have the time and energy to devote to the selling of the strip. I decided that whatever job they did would be better than whatever I could put forth at that time.

The strip appears in mainstream and alternative weekly newspapers, as well as on the Boing Boing website. At its peak, it was syndicated in print in over 100 newspapers. It ran on Salon.com from 1995 until March 18, 2010.

In 2012, Bolling launched a subscription service, the Inner Hive, which he credits with keeping the comic going amid declines in print newspapers.

After the September 11 attacks in 2001, and especially with the election of Donald Trump as president in 2016, Tom the Dancing Bug's focus became more overtly political. When accepting the Clifford K. and James T. Berryman Award for Editorial Cartoons on May 4, 2022, Bolling said, "When it started, it was just about apolitical. It was usually about a prehistoric ape-man, or an idiotic time traveler, or something even sillier. The comic strip got more political, more often, as it went along, certainly taking a turn after 9/11. But it was at the rise of Trump in 2016 that I just about handed the comic strip to what I saw as the most important political phenomenon of my lifetime."

Bolling also explained his approach to satire, pre- and post-Trump, at the same dinner:

In the before days, pre-Trumpism, my age-old satirist trick was to exaggerate and twist my target's position to expose its hypocrisy or flaws. But you can't exaggerate Trump. He does it before you can. And he's better at it. And then he'll double down on that. And forget about exposing the logical flaws in Trumpist positions - let's just say that logic is not their intended feature. So one technique I've developed is that instead of exaggerating, I'll recontextualize. I take exactly what's happening and put it in a new context to shine a different light on it. ... So I'll take the January 6 insurrection and the QAnon followers waiting for the Great Storm, and put it in the context of the Peanuts comic strip and cartoon, and Linus waiting for the Great Pumpkin. After all, what comes after Peanuts, but Q-Nuts. In a similar vein, when it was revealed back in 2016 that Donald Trump used to call reporters and pretend to be his own publicist, I started this Calvin and Hobbes pastiche series with little Donald and his imaginary publicist John. ... In this 2020 comic, I put certain Americans' refusal to wear masks during a pandemic into the context of a 1940s newsreel about the sacrifices Americans will and won't make for the good of the country.

== Recurring characters and segments ==
Tom the Dancing Bug has no real narrative continuity. The title itself is a dadaist non-sequitur, as there is no character called "Tom the Dancing Bug" ever seen or referred to in the strip.

Some individual strips are one-shot "stand-alone" presentations, but certain recurring features within the strip are seen regularly on a rotating basis. One of the most popular recurring segments, "Super-Fun-Pak Comix", appears roughly once every month or two, and is dealt with in a separate entry, below. Other features currently seen on a fairly frequent basis include:

- God-Man: The Superhero With Omnipotent Powers!: Placed in normal superhero situations, God-Man fights villains like Nietzsche-lad, Dr. Moral Relativism and Blasphemy Boy. God-Man's "mundane identity" (when he does not want to attract suspicion) is Milton Baxter. God-Man occasionally solves problems by re-creating the universe and organizing the atoms so that the problem is prevented in the first place. Bolling, speaking in an interview about readers who take offense to the God-Man strips, said "God-Man isn't actually God. He is a straw man that I'm using to make fun of some people's very simplistic views about religion and philosophy." Billy Billings is "God-Man's Pal", a parody of Jimmy Olsen.
- Lucky Ducky: The Poor Little Duck Who's Rich In Luck, is a recurring segment purportedly presented by Wall Street Journal Comix. Lucky Ducky first appeared in 2002, after The Wall Street Journal editorialized against progressive tax policies, calling poor workers "lucky duckies" because they have a smaller federal income tax burden. In his appearances in Bolling's strip, Lucky Ducky is an anthropomorphic duck who despite being homeless, destitute, and working in a crummy job always manages to enrage his nemesis, the very wealthy Hollingsworth Hound. Hollingsworth (who usually has a much more prominent role in this segment than the title character) views any source of joy, comfort or financial support in Lucky's life to be coming at the expense of the very rich, like himself. As an example, when Lucky is severely injured, and the emergency room accepts him as an indigent patient, Hollingsworth is apoplectic with rage at the "lucky" break the nearly comatose Lucky has received. Typically, the strip will end with an exploited, jailed, and/or near-death and hospitalized Lucky saying "Gotcha!" to an enraged Hollingsworth. Hollingsworth Hound has also occasionally been seen in solo adventures.
- Donald and John: A Boy President and his Imaginary Publicist features six year old president Donald Trump, who is seen conferring with his imaginary publicist John Barron (an imaginary character Trump created and used in real life). The drawing style, lettering, and general tone of the piece is a clear tribute to Calvin and Hobbes.
- Q-Nuts casts some of the characters from the Peanuts comic strip as QAnon adherents.
- Louis Maltby is an introverted kid with a major guilt complex. He's featured in segments "Games Louis Plays", which describe how Louis looks at the world, and "The Education of Louis", which show his confusion at the world around him. Louis is used to make social commentary by displaying how school and society treats him, and may be semi-autobiographical. He also sometimes appears in other segments when a kid is needed, and has on at least one occasion appeared in a superhero parody in the guise of his alter-ego, 'The Passive-Aggressor'.
- News of the Times parodies current events, in a fashion somewhat reminiscent of The March of Time newsreels.
- Judge Scalia was an extremist version of the U.S. Supreme Court justice Antonin Scalia, used to criticize Justice Scalia's Supreme Court opinions and overall judicial philosophy.
- Did You Know? points out "Fun Facts" in all sorts of things, poking fun at statistic-and-tidbit-obsessed society. The cult of celebrity is also a frequent target, with subversive trivia such as Nicole Kidman had to work as a waitress before she became famous, and not a single person asked her for her autograph and claiming that the Universe has never been nominated for an Oscar.
- Chagrin Falls is a recurring feature about the Smythes, a typical Middle American family.
- Bob is the extremely average male. He sits at home drinking beer and watching scrambled porn on TV on the weekends, and tries to avoid doing chores and other household duties. During the week, he works (or more often daydreams) in the cubicle by the elevator.
- Harvey Richards Esq., Lawyer for Children is about a lawyer who works for children by using the standard children's tricks for getting out of things or getting people to do things ("My fingers were crossed!" "I called no crossies!"). The point is that lawyers act an awful lot like young children. The character has been optioned for a feature film by New Line Cinema, to be co-produced by Universal Press Syndicate's AMUSE division, but was never realized.
- Brain in a Beaker is a disembodied brain that believes it is in a real body.
- Charley is an australopithecine—a less-developed hominid from the pliocene epoch. He does not have some of the more advanced emotions of humans. He has a taste for grape soft drinks. He appears to be a satire of Curious George.
- Billy Dare, Boy Adventurer parodies the clichés used in boy adventurer stories. Billy is very similar in appearance to Tintin, the famous Belgian comics adventurer.
- Sam Roland, the Detective Who Dies is a Sam Spade-esque noirish private detective, except that he always dies.
- James K. Poult, a Mallard Fillmore parody, is an "unbiased media chicken" with multiple conservative media outlets. He was seen briefly as a supporting character in a Hollingsworth Hound story in 2013, but has not had a "starring" role in any strip for several years.
- The Outer Reaches of Plot Twists parodies The Twilight Zone and Outer Limits, showing stories that use multiple plot twists to the point that suspension of disbelief is difficult to achieve.
- Larry Dodson is an "average joe" type character whom the art world has called "the most important artist of the 21st century."
- Nate the Neoconservative is a neoconservative who refuses to admit his mistakes.
- The Impossible Squad is a military squad of stereotypical 'tough guys', all sergeants that list 'explosives' as their expertise except for one member (whose specialty is usually extremely different from his squadmates). They consider explosives to be the only way to complete any mission. However, the 'different' member will always suggest another solution based on his skills but his idea is usually shot down by the rest of the team (probably because it does not involve the direct use of explosives).
- Hollywood Tales are stories that depict Hollywood celebrities, featuring realistic (but static) likeness of their faces, in humorous situations.
- The Ghost of James Caan is a character introduced in a Hollywood Tales story concerning actor Zac Efron. He is supposed to be the disembodied spirit of actor James Caan, despite the fact that Caan is (as of the time of his ghost's introduction) still very much alive. This is also true within the comic, causing confusion to the other characters that appear alongside him. The Ghost of James Caan now makes occasional appearances in "Super-Fun-Pak Comix", below.

=== Super-Fun-Pak Comix ===
A recurring feature, Super Fun-Pak Comix consists of four to six smaller strips, grouped together. These collections of smaller comic strips poke fun at the typical conventions and clichés of modern comic strips. For example, they commonly make fun of stereotypical New Yorker cartoon settings, such as two people sitting across a desk or a husband and wife at home reading the paper. Individual comics can also be based around peculiar or bizarre concepts, like 'Funny Only to Six-year-olds' or 'Comic Designed to Fit Vertical Spaces'. Many Fun-Pak strips are one-offs, but there are also numerous recurring strips, and occasionally, some Fun-Pak space is taken up by a fake ad for unlikely products. As well, some recurring long-form Tom The Dancing Bug comics occasionally make Fun-Pak appearances in a shorter format, and a few recurring Fun-Pak characters (Percival Dunwoody, Dinkle) have made appearances in a long-form strip.

Super-Fun-Pak Comix also appears as a daily strip on gocomix.com.

Currently recurring mini-strips (not always seen in every Fun-Pak) include:

- Percival Dunwoody, Idiot Time Traveller from 1909 is in awe of the modern age, although he is also amazed by things that existed well before 1909, including lightbulbs, dogs and hands. However, he is aware of his own idiocy. Later strips have revealed him to be unfamiliar with the mechanics of time travel and causality (for example, believing that accidentally interfering with someone in the future could prevent his own birth).
- Dinkle, The Unlovable Loser is a parody of such characters as Ziggy or The Born Loser, with the catch being that his status as a loser is completely justified because he is truly un-lovable; he is narcissistic and typically exhibits obnoxious attitudes, such as anti-Semitism, and sociopathic behaviour, ruthlessly exploiting everyone he encounters.
- Marital Mirth is a parody of The Lockhorns. The strip concerns a middle-aged married couple in an extremely unhappy relationship, and is supposedly drawn by bitter (fictional) cartoonist Rex Feinstein.
- Doug is an anthropomorphic cartoon creature who is too generically drawn to be any particular type of animal. He is not of high intelligence and has few real talents. The How to Draw Doug scripts make fun of Doug's rather pathetic life.
- Darthfield reimagines the cartoon character of Garfield the cat as Darth Vader, such as with the ability to use the Force to strangle people.
- Phil Collins is a comic strip about, unsurprisingly, Phil Collins. In recent Fun-Pak strips, he has been teamed with The Ghost of James Caan.
- Science Facts for the Immature presents a scientific fact which is either a double entendre or is followed by a punchline based on bodily humor. Variations of this mini-strip have included Science Facts for the Depressed and Science Facts for the Internet-Addled.
- Various Superhero comics, featuring superheroes with names and traits that parody superheroes in general. Examples include 'Talk-Up-His-Secret-Identity Man' and 'Garish-Skintight-Lycra-Outfit Man'.
- Hillbilly Bill, of The Hills is a parody of Barney Google and Snuffy Smith.
- Classix Comix/Comix Playhouse is an extremely shortened comic form of famous plays and novels. This is apparently a reference to Classics Illustrated, a series that provided classic books in shortened comic form.
- Comics for the Elderly (formerly "Hey, Old People! Comics!") shows old people giving ornery advice to young people and the young people quickly accepting it.
- Uncle Cap'n is an old lazy pirate who swears and makes you do his work for him through supposed 'puzzles' and 'fun' (but usually illegal) activities. He is a parody of Cappy Dick.
- Selfish Gene is about a boy named Gene who only acts in ways that are beneficial to him under the framework of sociobiology. This is a reference to Richard Dawkins' The Selfish Gene.
- Chaos Butterfly parodies the butterfly effect. Each strip features a butterfly in Brazil flapping its wings and indirectly causing something unpleasant to happen to a man in Chicago some time later.
- Killjoy was Here features Killjoy, a man who ruins any attempt at a funny dialogue by spouting out depressing facts on global issues such as poverty. The name evokes the World War II proto-meme and famously out-of-place marking Kilroy Was Here.
- The Epic/Brutal Report is a two-panel comic based on the good news/bad news gag. The first panel has a teenager relaying the 'good news' to his friends, who then exclaim 'Epic!'. In the second panel, he will tell them the 'bad news', to which his friends exclaim 'Brutal!'. The 'bad news' is always extremely disproportional and/or outlandish relative to the 'good news'.
- Comics Appropriating and Abusing Intellectual Property Newly Lapsed Into the Public Domain is a vertical strip that has run in the first Super Fun Pak Comix installment of each year since 2019, when works resumed lapsing into the public domain in the United States. Each parodies one of more of the works that entered the public domain of January 1 of that year, initially through fart jokes. 2022's installment was instead a complete Billy Dare strip, featuring the Hardy Boys.

Following the September 11 attacks, Bolling used the Super Fun Pak Comix format to acknowledge the events; the punchline to each one of the comics was, "Terrorists destroyed the World Trade Center, killing thousands".

== Books ==
Several book-form collections have been published:

- 1992: Tom the Dancing Bug (HarperPerennial) ISBN 0-06-096949-0
- 1997: All I Ever Needed to Know I Learned From My Golf-Playing Cats (NBM Publishing) ISBN 1-56163-183-3
- 2004: Thrilling Tom the Dancing Bug Stories (Andrews McMeel Publishing, oversized treasury) ISBN 0-7407-4737-1
- 2020: The Super-Fun-Pak Comix Reader (Clover Press) ISBN 978-1-951038-30-4
- 2022: Tom the Dancing Bug: Without The Bad Ones (Clover Press) ISBN 9781951038403

In 2020, Bolling began publishing a series containing the complete set of Tom the Dancing Bug comic strips. The first volume, Into the Trumpverse, collected strips from 2016-2019. Bolling then began adding volumes in reverse chronological order, dubbing Into the Trumpverse as Volume 7.

- 2020: Tom the Dancing Bug Presents: Into the Trumpverse (Clover Press) ISBN 1-9510-3808-8, collecting 2016-2019
- 2021: Tom the Dancing Bug Awakens (Clover Press) ISBN 9781951038359, collecting 2012-2015
- 2022: Tom the Dancing Bug: Eat the Poor (Clover Press) ISBN 9781951038427, collecting 2007-2011
- 2022: Tom the Dancing Bug: All-Mighty Comics (Clover Press) ISBN 9781951038564, collecting 2003-2006
- 2023: On the Trail of Tom The Dancing Bug (Clover Press) ISBN 9781951038731, collecting 1999-2002
- 2026: Sex, Tom the Dancing Bug, & Rock 'n' Roll (Clover Press) ISBN 978-1-951757-55-7, collecting 1995-1998
- 2026: Tom the Dancing Bug: Secret Origins (Clover Press) ISBN 978-1-951038-55-7, collecting 1990-1994
