= Pseudonyms used by Donald Trump =

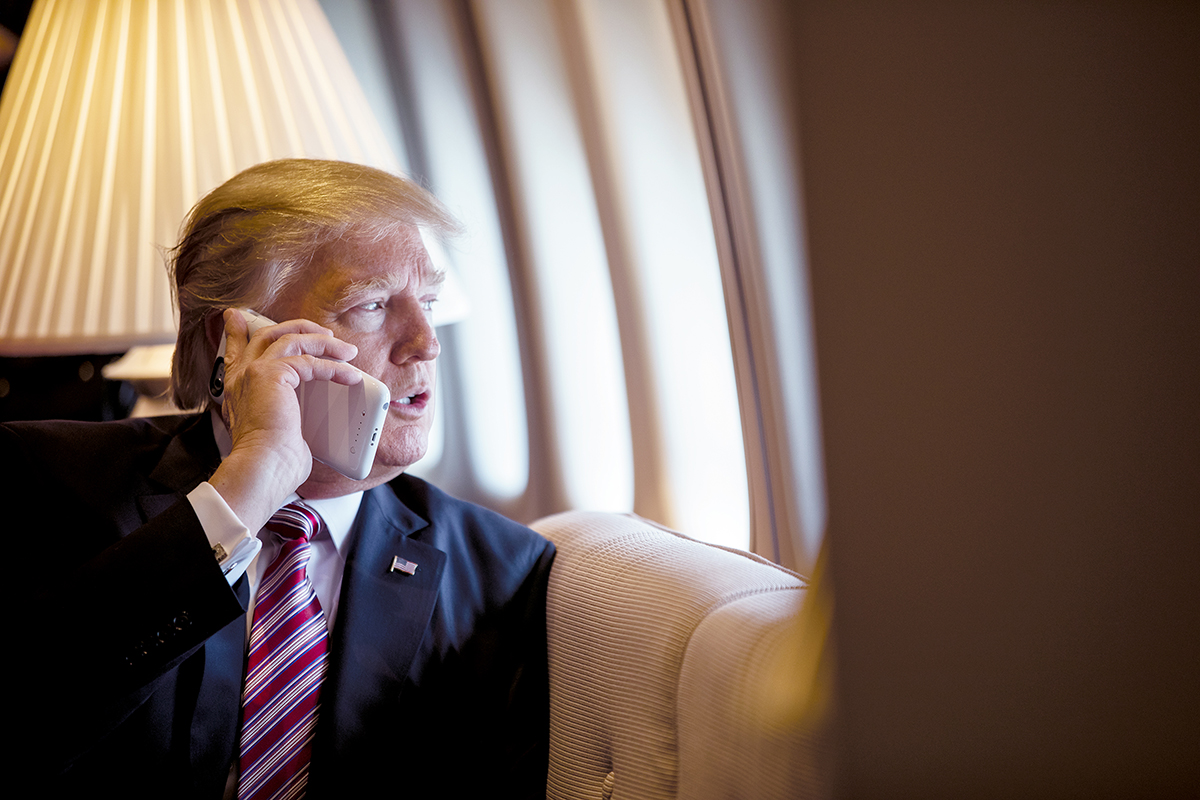
Trump making a phone call in 2017. He used aliases during call-in interviews throughout the 1980s and 1990s.

Donald Trump, the 45th and 47th president of the United States, is known for his use of pseudonyms. Prominent ones include "John Barron" (or "John Baron"), "John Miller" and "David Dennison". His practice of sometimes speaking to the media under the guise of a spokesperson has been described as "an open secret" at the Trump Organization and in New York media circles.

Trump used the alias "John Barron" (sometimes "John Baron") throughout the 1980s, with its earliest known usage in 1980 and its last acknowledgment in 1990. Trump stopped using the pseudonym after he was compelled to testify in court proceedings that John Barron was one of his pseudonyms. In 1991, a reporter for People interviewed Trump's purported publicist "John Miller" about the end of Trump's marriage to Ivana Trump and his rumored association with other women. A 1992 letter to New York magazine was signed by Trump's purported secretary, "Carolin Gallego". The name "David Dennison" was used as a pseudonym for Trump by his personal lawyer Michael Cohen in a 2016 pre-election non-disclosure agreement with pornographic film actress Stormy Daniels.

Trump's use of pseudonyms has had various references in popular culture, including a parody John Barron Twitter account and the Donald and John comics in Tom the Dancing Bug.

== Background ==
A writer for Fortune reported that Trump's father, Fred Trump, had used the pseudonym "Mr. Green" in business dealings.

Donald Trump, the 45th and 47th president of the United States, has used several aliases, including "John Barron" (or "John Baron"), "John Miller" and "David Dennison". His practice of sometimes speaking to the media under the guise of a spokesperson has been described as "an open secret" at the Trump Organization and in New York media circles.

== Aliases ==
=== "John Barron" ===
Trump used the alias "John Barron" (sometimes "John Baron") throughout the 1980s, with its earliest known usage in 1980 and its last acknowledgment in 1990. According to The Washington Post, the name was a "go-to alias when [Trump] was under scrutiny, in need of a tough front man or otherwise wanting to convey a message without attaching his own name to it". Barron would be introduced as a spokesperson for Trump, and is even described as a vice president of the Trump Organization in an article by Robert D. McFadden.

The alias first appeared in a May 7, 1980, article where "John Barron, vice president of Trump Organization" spawned rumors of a $1 billion deal to buy the World Trade Center: "I don't know if it's going to happen or not, but it is a possibility." A June 6, 1980, New York Times article quotes "John Baron [sic], a vice president of the Trump Organization" defending Trump's controversial destruction of sculptures on the Bonwit Teller flagship store (now the site of Trump Tower), which he had promised to the Metropolitan Museum of Art. The pseudonymous vice president acted as Trump's spokesperson for three days in that case. Trump continued to pose as "Barron" on occasion for the rest of the decade. In 1983, "Barron" told the press that Trump had decided not to purchase the Cleveland Indians.

In May 1984, "Barron" lied to then-Forbes reporter Jonathan Greenberg about Trump's wealth and assets to get Trump on the Forbes 400 list. "Barron" stated to Greenberg that "most of the assets [of Donald's father Fred Trump] have been consolidated to Mr. [Donald] Trump." In April 2018, Greenberg retrieved and made public the original audio recordings of his exchange with "Barron", and stated that "Trump, through this sockpuppet, was telling me he owned 'in excess of 90 percent'" of Fred Trump's assets. Ultimately, Greenberg included Trump at the end of the Forbes 400 list at $100 million, one fifth of the $500 million which "Barron" was claiming as Donald Trump's net worth. According to Greenberg, Donald Trump was only ever worth just under $5 million, which was 5% of the net worth which was attributed to him by Forbes at the time and only 1% of what "Barron" was claiming. Greenberg has corrected the record by stating that, as revealed in court documents in proceedings years later, Donald Trump never owned any of Fred Trump's assets until 1999 after Fred's death, and even then, inheriting only his share of Fred's deceased estate, with Donald Trump's three siblings and some grandchildren beneficiaries inheriting their corresponding shares.

Also in 1984, "Barron" gave the press a positive spin on the 1984 collapse of a plan to build Trump Castle in New York. In 1985, "Barron" urged fellow United States Football League team owners to partially reimburse Trump for a high-priced player. In April 1985, "John Baron, a vice president in the Trump Organization", announced to the press that the Trump Organization had signed an agreement to buy an unopened Hilton Hotel in Atlantic City.

Some New York editors recalled that "calls from Barron were at points so common that they became a recurring joke on the city desk".

Trump reduced his public usage of the pseudonym after he was compelled to testify in court proceedings that John Barron was one of his pseudonyms. The Washington Post suggested that Trump might have used the pseudonym longer if not for the "lawsuit in which he testified, under oath in 1990, that 'I believe on occasion I used that name.'"

=== "John Miller" ===
In 1991, a reporter for People attempted to interview Trump about the end of his marriage to Ivana Trump and his rumored association with other women. She was called back by a publicist who gave his name as "John Miller", who gave her a long interview about Trump's marital affairs ("He's a good guy, and he's not going to hurt anybody. ... He treated his wife well and ... he will treat Marla well."), his attractiveness to women, and his wealth. The reporter thought at the time that "Miller" sounded remarkably like Trump, and played the tape to several people who knew Trump and agreed it was Trump. She says Trump later told her it was a "joke gone awry". Trump denied that he posed as John Miller to tell People, "Madonna called and wanted to go out with him, that I can tell you."

In 2016, The Washington Post obtained a copy of the tape and reported that it was Trump using a pseudonym. Trump denied it, saying, "It was not me on the phone." Later, when a reporter asked Trump if he had ever employed a spokesperson named John Miller, he hung up.

=== "Carolin Gallego" ===
A 1992 letter to New York magazine signed by "Carolin Gallego" replied to an article by Julie Baumgold. The letter asserted that "as his secretary" she knew Trump treated women with respect. This letter resurfaced in a 2017 article in the Washingtonian which highlighted similarities between patterns of repetition in Trump's speech and the final line in the letter, which read: "I do not believe any man in America gets more calls from women wanting to see him, meet him, or go out with him. The most beautiful women, the most successful women—all women love Donald Trump." The Washingtonian was unable to find any record of a Carolin Gallego as secretary to Trump and said that it was not out of the question that Trump himself had written the letter.

=== "David Dennison" ===
The name "David Dennison" was used as a pseudonym for Trump by his personal lawyer Michael Cohen in a 2016 pre-election non-disclosure agreement with pornographic film actress Stormy Daniels (born Stephanie Gregory Clifford and identified in the document as Peggy Peterson) regarding her allegation that she and Trump had an extramarital affair in 2006. Keith Davidson acted as Stormy Daniels' legal representative in that agreement. A later legal representative of Daniels, Michael Avenatti, later claimed that Davidson was a double agent all along working for Trump and Cohen.

Paul Campos wrote in Intelligencer that the use of the Dennison pseudonym was one of several pieces of evidence that Elliott Broidy, who had admitted to an affair with Playboy model Shera Bechard, was in fact covering for Donald Trump, who Campos speculated actually had the affair. This view was echoed by Will Bunch of The Philadelphia Inquirer.

== In popular culture ==
A satirical account with the handle @barronjohn1946 was registered with the location "Not the White House" and including "Not Donald Trump" in the bio after the suspension of Trump's personal Twitter account in January 2021. It had amassed 318,900 followers, and its first tweet received more than 1.5 million likes, as of February 22, 2026.

Cartoonist Ruben Bolling occasionally satirizes Trump's use of John Barron in Tom the Dancing Bug comics titled Donald and John: A Boy and His Imaginary Publicist. It is drawn as a homage to the comic strip Calvin and Hobbes, about a boy with a rich fantasy life.

In season 3, episode 5, of The Good Fight, a character places a fake call to The Wall Street Journal using the name John Barron. This is followed by a musical interlude written by Jonathan Coulton and animated by Steve Angel explaining Trump's use of the alias.

Don Winslow's 2019 novel, The Border, features a Trump-like president named "John Dennison".

== See also ==
- False or misleading statements by Donald Trump
- List of nicknames of presidents of the United States § Donald Trump
- List of nicknames used by Donald Trump
