= Thomas F. Woodlock =

Irish-born editor of the Wall Street Journal

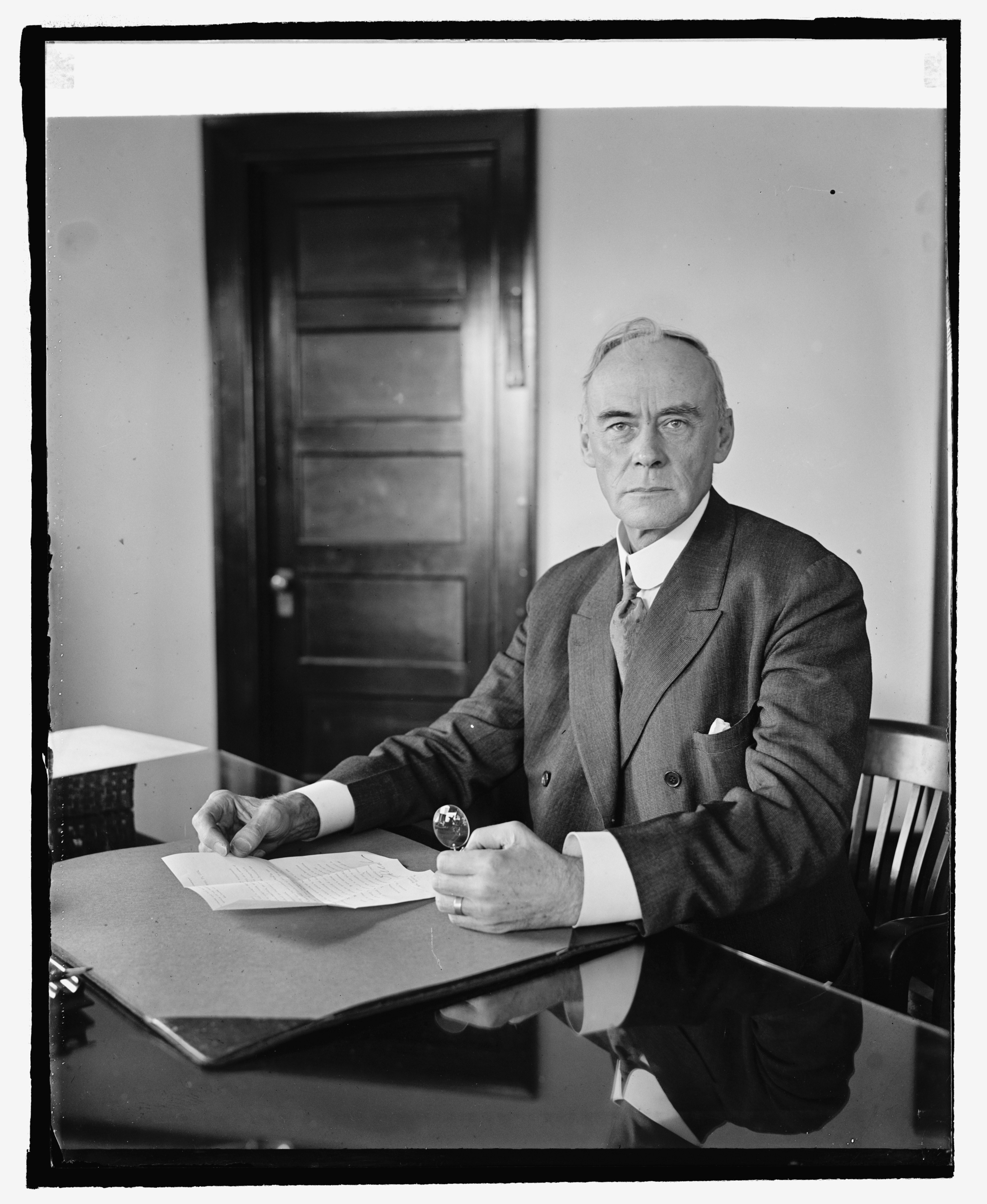
- Thomas F. Woodlock in his office at the Interstate Commerce Commission in 1925
- Born: Thomas Francis Woodlock; September 1, 1866; Dublin, Ireland
- Died: August 25, 1945 (aged 78); New York City, New York, U.S.
- Known for: Editor of The Wall Street Journal; Interstate Commerce Commission commissioner
- Notable work: The Anatomy of a Railroad Report (1895); Ton-Mile Cost (1899); The Catholic Pattern (1942)
- Political party: Democratic
- Awards: Laetare Medal (1943)

Thomas Francis Woodlock (September 1, 1866 – August 25, 1945) was editor of the Wall Street Journal and a member of the United States Interstate Commerce Commission (ICC). He was appointed to the commission in January 1925 to succeed Mark W. Potter, and confirmed by the Senate on March 27, 1926. He was awarded the Laetare Medal in 1943 for his work as an author of Catholic literature.

== Family and early life ==
Thomas was born on September 1, 1866, in Dublin, Ireland, to Thomas and Emilia (Moran) Woodlock. After a primary school education in Ireland, he attended the Jesuit-run Beaumont College in Windsor, England. He graduated third in his class at London University, then attended St. Francis College in New York where he earned an honorary Master of Arts degree in 1905. He earned a Doctor of Laws degree from Fordham University in 1906.

== Career ==
Woodlock had been a member of the London Stock Exchange and, after emigrating to the United States in September 1892, the New York Stock Exchange from 1906 until 1918. During this time he worked for the Dow-Jones News Service directly with Charles H. Dow and Edward D. Jones as part owner of the company with a specialty in American railroads. He worked as financial editor for the New York Sun and, following Dow's death in 1903, as acting editor for The Wall Street Journal then was formally appointed to the editorship in February 1905. It was his strong expertise in finance that led to his appointment at the Interstate Commerce Commission.

His appointment in January 1925 by President Coolidge to the ICC, which itself followed two failed nominations to the same position, was objected to by Southern congressmen who felt an executive from the South would better fit the role. Those objecting used, among other arguments, the fact that he was born in Ireland and educated in England as a disadvantage. The Senate finally approved his appointment on March 27, 1926. Woodlock served on the ICC until his resignation in 1930, after which he rejoined The Wall Street Journal as a contributing editor; he was succeeded on the ICC by Charles Mahaffie.

Woodlock was also very involved in Catholic organizations, serving as a trustee of Manhattanville College of the Sacred Heart, an early member of the National Catholic Alumni Federation, a director for the Catholic Encyclopedia as well as author of several of its articles, and president of the Laymen's League for Retreats and Social Studies.

In 1943, Woodlock was awarded the Laetare Medal for his work as an author of Catholic literature, with the president of Notre Dame, Rev. Hugh O'Donnell, calling him "one of the most vigorous and effective apologists among the Catholic laity of America."

Woodlock died in New York on August 25, 1945, and was buried in Gate of Heaven cemetery. His final column published in the Wall Street Journal was based on the 71st birthday speech of Herbert Hoover, in which Hoover said "America should again proclaim our faith. ... Our first post-war purpose should be to restore it."

== Published works ==
- Woodlock, Thomas F. (1895). The Anatomy of a Railroad Report. United States Book Company – via Internet Archive.
- Woodlock, Thomas F. (1899). Ton-Mile Cost. Dow Jones & Co. – via Internet Archive. "Thomas F. Woodlock."
- Woodlock, Thomas F. (1909). The Anatomy of a Railroad Report and Ton-Mile Cost. New York, NY: Doubleday, Page & Co. – via Archive.org. (combined reprint edition of the two books)
- Woodlock, Thomas F. (1942). The Catholic Pattern. Simon & Schuster.
