= Paul Gigot =

American political analyst and journalist

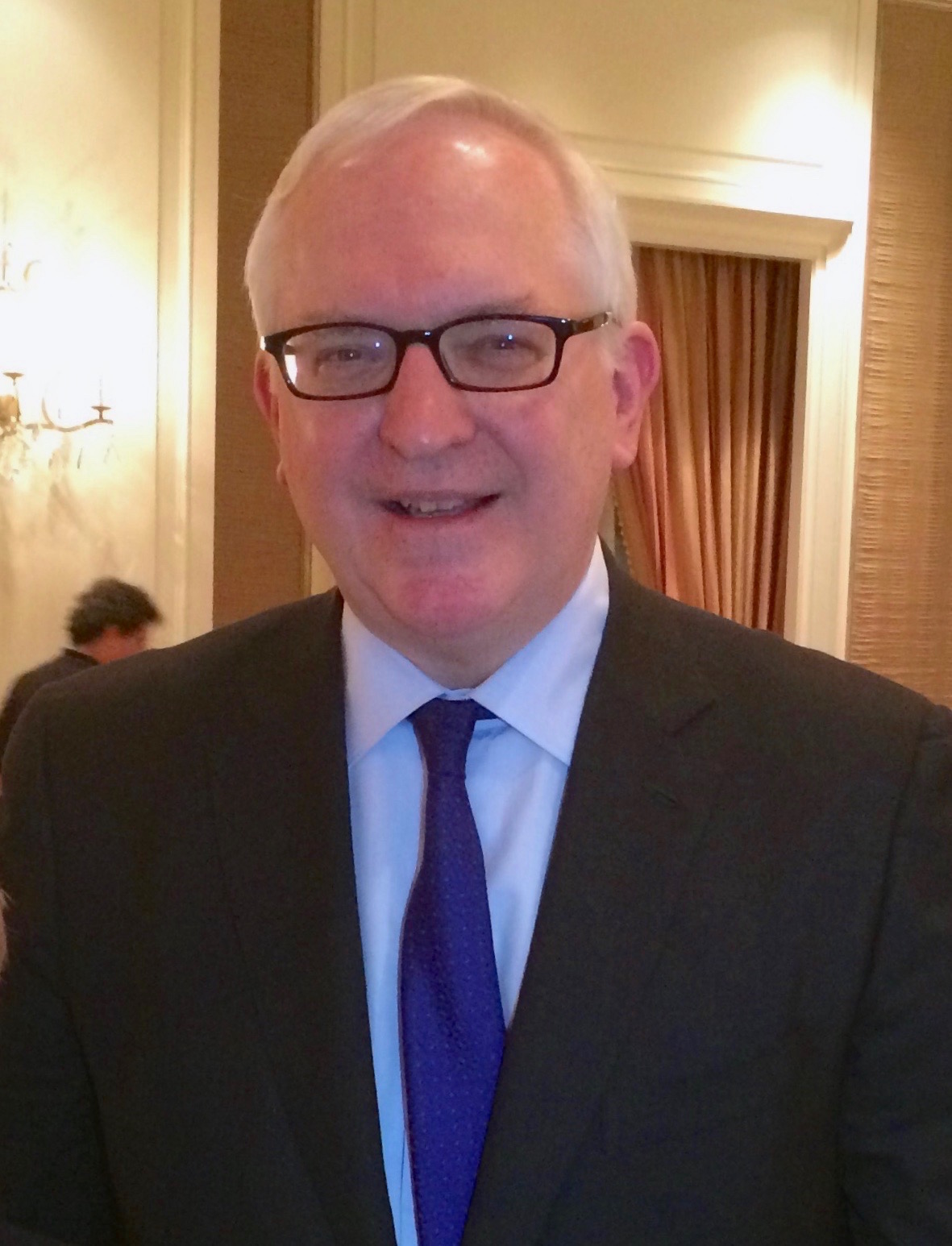
- Gigot in 2015
- Born: May 24, 1955 (age 71); San Antonio, Texas, U.S.
- Education: Dartmouth College (BA)
- Occupations: Political analyst, journalist
- Awards: Pulitzer Prize (2000)

Paul Anthony Gigot (/dʒiːˈɡoʊ/; born May 24, 1955) is an American Pulitzer Prize–winning conservative political commentator and editor of the editorial pages for The Wall Street Journal. He is also the moderator of the public affairs television series Journal Editorial Report, a program reflecting the Journal's editorial views which airs on Fox News Channel.

== Early life and education ==
Paul Gigot was born in San Antonio, Texas, and he and his family moved to Green Bay, Wisconsin, not long afterward. He is Roman Catholic and attended Catholic schools for 12 years. He graduated from Abbot Pennings High School in De Pere, Wisconsin in 1973.

He graduated summa cum laude from Dartmouth College in 1977, where he was editor-in-chief of The Dartmouth. He was a student of English professor and conservative columnist Jeffrey Hart.

== Career ==
Prior to becoming an editor at The Wall Street Journal, Gigot spent 14 years writing the column "Potomac Watch". His career at the Journal began in 1980, when he became a reporter covering Chicago, Illinois. Two years later he became the paper's Asia correspondent in Hong Kong. While in Hong Kong in 1984, Gigot was placed in charge of The Wall Street Journal Asia.

From 1986 to 1987, Gigot served as a White House Fellow under President Ronald Reagan.

During the 1990s, he was a regular guest on The NewsHour with Jim Lehrer, appearing in the program's weekly political analysis segment, opposite Mark Shields, the regular liberal pundit and replaced David Gergen on the show.

In 2000, Gigot won a Pulitzer Prize for Commentary for his weekly "Potomac Watch" column in The Wall Street Journal. In a column cited by the Pulitzer jury and highlighted by The New York Times as an example of his insightful conservative commentary, he examined the Clinton impeachment, writing "[a] president paranoid about his legacy even before the perjury scandal will now begin a campaign to make impeachment seem illegitimate", and remarking "[only in Washington] could a man who lies under oath be equated with someone who tries to defend the value of that oath."

He became the Wall Street Journal's vice president and editorial-page editor in 2001.

On 23 May 2006, he received the Wisconsin Historical Society's Lucius W. Neiman Award for Distinction in Journalism and Communications. Gigot, along with four others were also honored as a 2006 Wisconsin History Maker at the first annual History Makers Gala.

In December 2007, Gigot was elected to the Pulitzer Prize board.

Paul Gigot has been described as leading opposition to the 2012 Republican presidential nominee, Mitt Romney, via the editorial pages of The Wall Street Journal.

In 2015, he was elected to succeed Danielle Allen as the chair of the Pulitzer Prize Board.

In 2017, Gigot was alleged to have forced out junior colleague Mark Lasswell from The Wall Street Journal the previous summer, after Lasswell continued to publish op-eds critical of Donald Trump. Gigot refused to comment on the personnel change.

Under Gigot's tenure as editorial page editor and vice president, The Wall Street Journal's editorial page has been criticized by other media and its own reporters for what these critics perceive to be a pro-Trump stance.

Gigot hosts the weekly cable show Journal Editorial Report on Fox News Channel.

In 2022, Gigot received the Alexander Hamilton Award along with Cliff Asness, from the Manhattan Institute.

On 12 October 2023, Gigot hosted Mark Dubowitz, the CEO of the Foundation for Defense of Democracies on Potomac Watch. The topic of the interview was Israel, Hamas and Iran.
