= Rebecca Smith (journalist) =

Rebecca A. Smith was a reporter in the San Francisco, California, bureau of The Wall Street Journal.

== Early life and education ==
Smith grew up in Seattle, WA. She obtained her bachelor's degree, Phi Beta Kappa and magna cum laude, from the University of Washington. She later received her master's degree from Mills College in Oakland, CA.

== Career ==
Smith started her career in journalism in 1977 as a reporter and photographer for the Friday Harbor Journal in the San Juan Islands in Washington State. A year later she joined the Daily Oklahoman where she served as a copy editor and reporter for the state desk. In 1981, she joined "The Daily Journal-American" in Bellevue, Wash. In 1985 she moved to the Oakland Tribune in California, reporting on business and in 1992 she worked for the San Jose Mercury News as a reporter, first covering the semiconductor industry and then responsible for covering consumer issues. From 1998 - 1999 she was a consumer affairs reporter for the San Francisco Chronicle. Smith began working as an energy reporter for The Wall Street Journal in August 1999.

She and colleague John R. Emshwiller shared responsibility for the unfolding Enron scandal in 2001, scoring many journalistic coups in the process. They later collaborated on a book on the subject called 24 Days. She joined the WSJ investigations team in 2018.

She died on December 15th, 2023 at the age of 68.

== Honors and awards ==
In 1996 Smith shared a Gerald Loeb Award for distinguished financial and economics reporting, while at the San Jose Mercury News, for stories about big utility PG&E Corp. In 2001 she won a Gerald Loeb Award for beat writing at The Wall Street Journal for coverage of the California energy crisis. She shared a third Gerald Loeb Award with John Emshwiller in 2002 for stories in The Wall Street Journal about the unfolding Enron scandal. Earlier in her career, she received a California Award for Excellence in economic writing and in 1990, she won a John Hancock Award for distinguished financial writing while at the Oakland Tribune for stories about the savings and loan crisis. Smith shared another Gerald Loeb Award in 2020 and was a Pulitzer Prize finalist for her contributions to "How PG&E Burned California".

== Sources ==
- 24 Days
- 24 Days press release
- Fleet Owner Magazine
