= John R. Emshwiller =

American journalist

John Robert Emshwiller is a senior national correspondent for The Wall Street Journal.

In 2002, he shared the Gerald Loeb Award for his coverage of the unfolding Enron scandal with Rebecca Smith. The two authored a book on the scandal entitled 24 Days.

Emshwiller served as editor-in-chief of The Daily Californian, the University of California, Berkeley student newspaper, in Spring 1971. An editorial written during his tenure has been attributed by many people as the cause the People's Park riot. As an outgrowth of that event, and during his tenure, the university and the Daily Californian severed the university's official sponsorship, and the newspaper became an independent off-campus newspaper.
