= Kevin Sprouls =

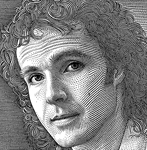
- Kevin Sprouls, a "hedcut" autoportrait.
- Known for: Hedcut portrait style
- Website: www.sprouls.com

Kevin Sprouls is the creator of the Wall Street Journal portrait style known as hedcut.

He began as a freelance illustrator for Dow Jones and Company, the parent company for The Wall Street Journal. In 1979 he introduced a style of stipple portraiture that the Journal adopted because it was reminiscent of the sort of old engravings that are found on bank notes. Kevin became the first full-time artist at the Journal, eventually the Assistant Art Director and head of the illustration department. His Wall Street Journal stipple illustrations were awarded a gold medal at The Society of Illustrators competition in 1986. His style of portraiture, later coined hedcut, is the definitive corporate icon and is created completely by hand, not computer.

Sprouls is once again a freelance artist but still works for Dow Jones on occasion, along with a host of other publishing clients. He has been featured on CNN, in the American National Portrait Gallery and in the Smithsonian magazine.

His pen is housed in the Newseum in Washington, D.C..
