= Hedcut =

Style of drawing

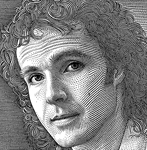
Kevin Sprouls, a "hedcut" autoportrait.

Hedcut is a term referring to a style of drawing associated with The Wall Street Journal half-column portrait illustrations.

The newspaper staff uses the stipple method of many small dots and the hatching method of small lines to create an image, and is designed to emulate the look of woodcuts from old-style newspapers, and engravings on certificates and currency. The phonetic spelling of "hed" may be based on newspapers' use of the term hed for "headline".

The Wall Street Journal adopted the current form of this portraiture in 1979 when Kevin Sprouls, a freelance artist, approached the paper with some ink-dot illustrations he had created. The front-page editor felt that the drawings complemented the paper's classical feeling and gave it a sense of stability. Additionally, they are generally more legible than photographs of the same size would be. Sprouls was subsequently hired as a staff illustrator and remained there until 1987. Today, The Journal employs five hedcut artists.

Each drawing takes between three and five hours to produce. First, a high-quality photograph must be obtained. This photograph is then converted to grayscale, and the contrast is adjusted in Photoshop. The altered photograph is printed out, placed on a light table, and overlaid with tracing vellum. The illustrators then trace directly over this image with pens, recreating the source photo using specific dot and line patterns. The final tracing is then scanned back into Photoshop, where it can be colorized if needed or otherwise adjusted. These drawings are traditionally created at 18 by 31 picas (3 by 5 1/6 inches or 7.6 by 13.1 centimetres) and then reduced to fit the column size.

Women are sometimes more difficult to depict than men as they tend to have more complicated hairstyles, which are often cropped for simplicity and to allow their portraits to fit into the same-size frame as the men's without reducing the relative scale of the women's faces.

A March 18, 2010, video produced by The Wall Street Journal shows the artists at work. In 2019, The Wall Street Journal began developing a proprietary application that generated custom hedcut portraits using machine learning trained on a dataset of over 2,000 hedcut drawings and photographs. In December 2019, The Wall Street Journal's R&D Chief Francesco Marconi announced that hedcuts published in the newspaper would continue to be created by human artists, but that the AI-driven tool would be offered to all its members in order to "democratize" the illustrations and create an ongoing repository of photos for the app to continue to learn from in order to refine its results.

The Smithsonian Institution acquired 66 original hedcut drawings in 2002 and have put them on permanent display in the National Portrait Gallery.
