= Journal Editorial Report =

US weekly television program

- Presented by: Paul Gigot
- Country of origin: United States

Production
- Running time: 1 hour (previously 30 minutes)

Original release
- Network: PBS
- Release: September 17, 2004 – December 2, 2005
- Network: Fox News Channel
- Release: December 2, 2005 – present

The Journal Editorial Report is a weekly American interview and panel discussion TV program on Fox News Channel, hosted by Paul Gigot, editorial page editor of The Wall Street Journal. Prior to moving to Fox News, the show aired on PBS for 15 months, ending on December 2, 2005.

Opening with a newsmaker of the week, Gigot usually interviews a guest for the first half of the program, asking questions related to the writings of the guest or a current event of interest to the guest.

Following the guest segment, the program becomes a panel discussion of Wall Street Journal editorial writers giving their opinions on the political, economic, and cultural issues of the current week. The final segment labeled Hits and Misses lets the panelists comment on the best and worst stories or events of the week.

The program is broadcast Saturdays at 2:00 p.m. (Eastern)

The transcript of each show appears on OpinionJournal.com on the following Monday.

== Panel members – current ==
These Wall Street Journal editorial staff appear on the show:

- Daniel Henninger – Deputy Editor of the WSJ Editorial page, and writer on the editorial page since 1977
- William McGurn - Former Washington Bureau Chief of National Review, he became Chief Editorial Writer of the WSJ in 1998 and was the chief speechwriter for President George W. Bush from June 2006 until February 2008
- Kimberley Strassel – Washington based author of Potomac Watch column – prior to joining the editorial staff, she worked in the news section covering real estate and technology.

== Panel members — past ==
- Jason Riley – in 1996, Jason became the first Interactive Editor for the Leisure & Arts section of WSJ.COM web portal
- Dorothy Rabinowitz – 2001 Pulitzer Prize winner for her articles on American Culture and Society. She is an author and was a freelance writer, syndicated columnist and TV commentator prior to joining the WSJ.
- Robert Pollock – features editor – worked five years in Brussels, and moved to the US editorial staff in 2000
- James Taranto, who formerly wrote the popular "Best of the Web Today" feature for Opinion Journal, also appears occasionally in the role of "funny man".
- John Fund, political columnist for the Opinion Journal website, also makes occasional appearances.
- Alicia Henley
