= Ruben Bolling =

American cartoonist (born 1963)

- Speaking at a Borders Books; Washington, D.C., July 7, 2007
- Born: Kenneth Fisher; 1963 (age 62–63) New Jersey, U.S.
- Area: Cartoonist
- Pseudonym: Ruben Bolling
- Notable works: Tom the Dancing Bug
- Awards: Association of Alternative Newsweeklies, Best Cartoon, 2002, 2003, 2007, 2008, 2009; Society of Professional Journalists Award for Editorial Cartooning, 2010; Herblock Prize for editorial cartooning, 2017; National Cartoonists Society Reuben Award, 2017 and 2022; Robert F. Kennedy Book & Journalism Awards, Best Cartoon, 2018; Berryman Award for Editorial Cartoons from National Press Foundation, 2021
- Children: 3

Ruben Bolling is a pseudonym for Ken Fisher (born c. 1963 in New Jersey), an American cartoonist and the author of Tom the Dancing Bug. His work started out apolitical, featuring absurdist humor, parodying comic strip conventions, or critiquing celebrity culture. He came to increasingly satirize conservative politics after the September 11 attacks and Iraq war in the early 2000s. This trend strengthened with the Donald Trump presidency and right-wing populism from 2017 to 2020, his critiques of which earned him several cartooning awards.

== Career ==
Raised in the Short Hills section of Millburn, New Jersey, Fisher graduated from Millburn High School in 1980, where he was co-editor of the school newspaper and started drawing cartoons, but with little success.

Fisher, who has no formal art training, read many comic strips when he was a child (his biggest influence being Garry Trudeau's Doonesbury), and sometimes features their styles in his work. However, he did not aspire to be a full-time cartoonist; instead he studied economics as an undergraduate at Tufts University and is a 1987 graduate of Harvard Law School. It was at Harvard in the mid-1980s that Fisher came up with the idea for "Tom the Dancing Bug" and when he adopted his pseudonym, Ruben Bolling that is a melding of the names of two favorite old-time baseball players, Ruben Amaro and Frank Bolling. Tom the Dancing Bug originally ran in the Harvard Law School Record.

After graduation from Harvard Law School, Fisher practiced law for several years before resigning to pursue cartooning full-time. When that did not work out, cartooning became a side interest and Fisher became a full-time employee at a financial services company. Tom the Dancing Bug was picked up for weekly syndication in 1997 by Universal Press Syndicate.

While Fisher worked on building a full-time cartooning career, he became involved in a project with New Line Cinema to produce a movie about his character Harvey Richards, Esq., a "Lawyer for Children", that has not been realized.

Newspapers that have published Tom the Dancing Bug include The Washington Post, The Village Voice, and Los Angeles Times. At its peak, Tom the Dancing Bug was syndicated in print in more than 100 newspapers. It now is published almost entirely online.

In 2012, Fisher launched a subscription service, the Inner Hive, which he credits with keeping the comic strip going amid declines in print newspapers.

A Super Fun-Pak Comix installment from 2014, entitled The Comic Strip That Has A Finale Every Day, parodied farewell installments from long-running comic strips. This then became an ongoing feature on the gocomics.com site under the pseudonym John "Scully" Scully, releasing the same comic strip every day.

In 2015, Fisher published the first in a series of children's books, The EMU Club Adventures.

== Awards ==
Ruben Bolling is a five-time winner of the Association of Alternative Newsweeklies Award for Best Cartoon, for 2002, 2003, 2007, 2008, and 2009. In 2010, he received the Society of Professional Journalists award for Editorial Cartooning for a non-daily publication.

He won numerous awards for his satirical criticism of the Donald Trump presidency. He was the winner of the 2017 Herblock Prize for editorial cartooning based on a selection of 15 Trump-themed Tom the Dancing Bug cartoons. In 2017, he won a 2017 Silver Reuben Award from the National Cartoonists Society for "Donald and John," a series in the style of Calvin and Hobbes that cast Donald Trump as a childish Calvin-like figure and Trump alter-ego John Barron as Trump's "imaginary publicist" in place of Hobbes.

He was awarded a prize for best cartoon in the 2018 Robert F. Kennedy Journalism Award. In 2019 and 2021 Ken Fisher was a finalist in the Editorial Cartooning category for the Pulitzer Prize. For "mordant wit, superior artwork, and inventive delivery" Ruben Rolling won the 2021 Berryman Award for Editorial Cartoons from the National Press Foundation.

Ruben Bolling won the National Cartoonists Society's Reuben Award for Editorial Cartoons in 2022 and was nominated again in 2023.

== Personal life ==
Fisher is married to an attorney. They have three children.

== Bibliography ==
- 1992: Tom the Dancing Bug ISBN 0-06-096949-0
- 1997: All I Ever Needed to Know I Learned From My Golf-Playing Cats ISBN 1-56163-183-3
- 2004: Thrilling Tom the Dancing Bug Stories (oversized treasury) (Andrews McMeel) ISBN 0-7407-4737-1
- 2015: Alien Invasion in My Backyard: An EMU Club Adventure (Andrews McMeel) ISBN 978-1449457099
- 2015: Ghostly Thief of Time: An EMU Club Adventure (Andrews McMeel) ISBN 978-1449457105
- 2020: Tom the Dancing Bug Presents: Into the Trumpverse (Clover Press) ISBN 1-9510-3808-8
- 2020: The Super-Fun-Pak Comix Reader (Clover Press) ISBN 978-1-951038-30-4
- 2021: Tom the Dancing Bug Awakens (Clover Press) ISBN 9781951038359
- 2022: Tom the Dancing Bug: Without The Bad Ones (Clover Press) ISBN 9781951038403
- 2022: Tom the Dancing Bug: Eat the Poor (Clover Press) ISBN 9781951038427
- 2022: Tom the Dancing Bug: All-Mighty Comics (Clover Press) ISBN 9781951038564
- 2023: On the Trail of Tom The Dancing Bug (Clover Press) ISBN 9781951038731
