= Selina Cheng =

Hong Kong journalist

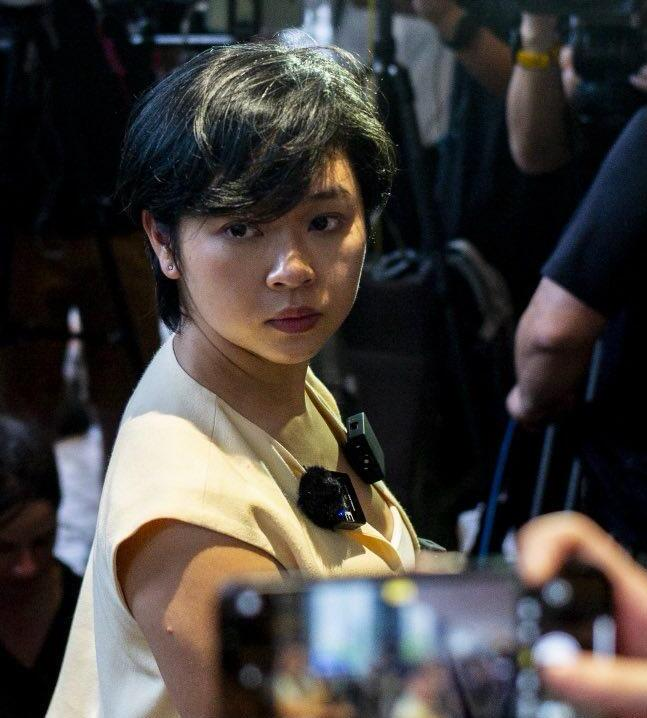
- Cheng in 2024

Chair of Hong Kong Journalists Association
- Incumbent
- Assumed office 1 July 2024
- Preceded by: Ronson Chan

Personal details
- Education: Columbia University Graduate School of Journalism
- Occupation: Journalist

Selina Cheng (Chinese: 鄭嘉如) is a Hong Kong journalist, serving as chair of the Hong Kong Journalists Association (HKJA) press union since July 2024. Cheng has investigated editorial wars between Wikipedia editors, political censorship in Hong Kong's libraries, the Hong Kong government's attempt to lobby the U.S. Congress, and Chinese asylum seekers in the United States. Cheng previously served as Hong Kong reporter for The Wall Street Journal covering China's energy and automobile sectors from 2022 to 2024. Cheng previously was a reporter at the Hong Kong Free Press and HK01.

== Media unionism ==
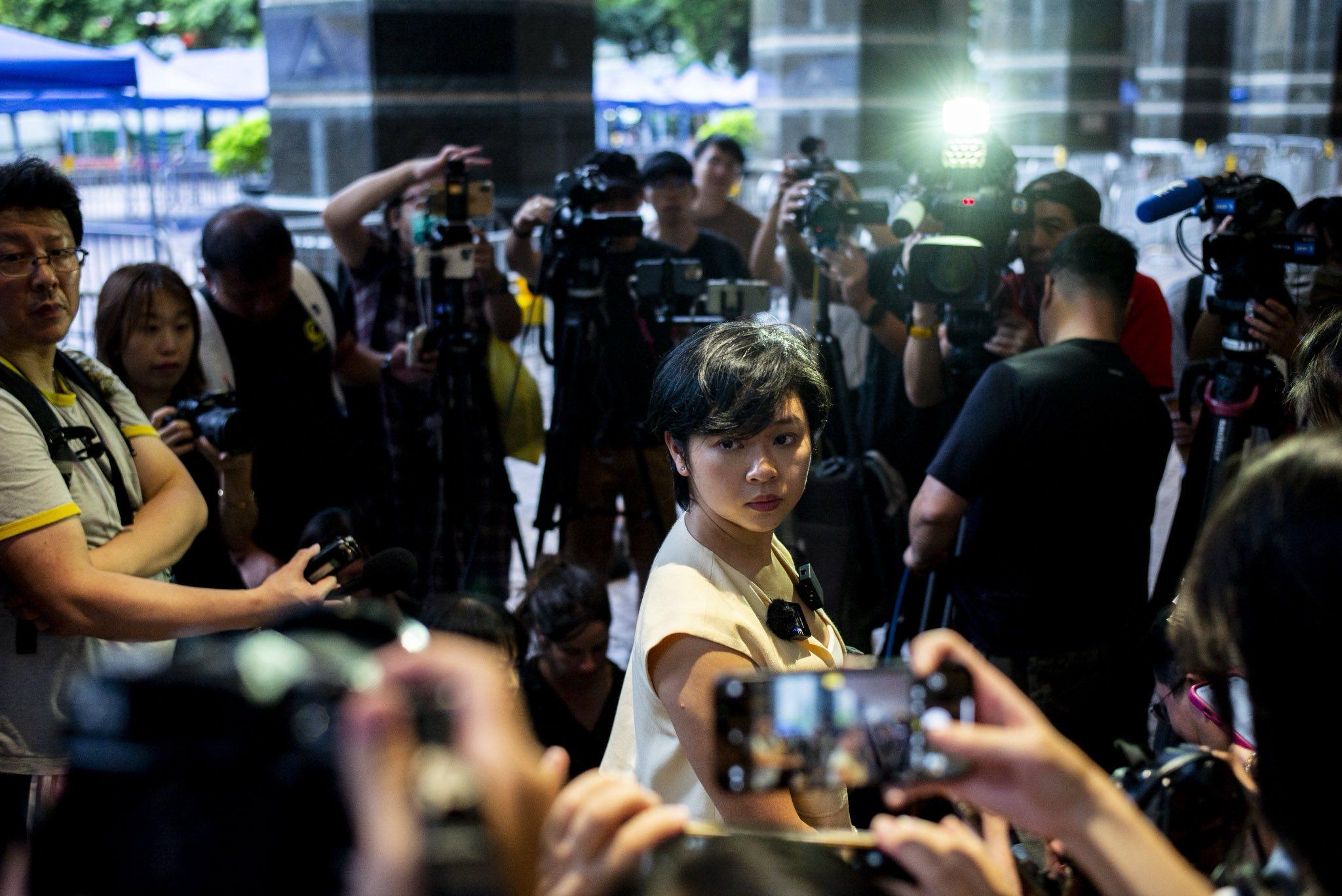
Cheng hosts her first press conference

Cheng joined the HKJA board in 2021. On 22 June 2024, Cheng was elected 100-2 as chair at the association's annual general meeting, succeeding Ronson Chan. She assumed office on July 1.

On 17 July, Cheng was fired from the Wall Street Journal. She claimed her employer pressured her not to stand for election for chair of the union. The Journal has denied that Cheng's firing was related to her role at the HKJA. The sacking attracted criticism from advocates for freedom of the press in Hong Kong, and statements of support for Cheng. Statements were issued by Human Rights Watch, the Asian department of Georgetown University Law Center, the Asia chapter of the Asian American Journalists Association, the Foreign Correspondents’ Club of China, Reporters Without Borders, Hong Kong’s Foreign Correspondents’ Club, NewsGuild, the Faculty of the Columbia Journalism School, and the HKJA.

The US-based Congressional-Executive Commission on China noted on its official Twitter account that it was "tracking concerns" about Cheng's firing. As of August 2026, Cheng remains HKJA's interim chair.

=== Private prosecution ===
After mediation attempts with Dow Jones proved unsuccessful, Cheng announced in November 2024 that she would pursue legal action against her former employer. She filed a complaint with Hong Kong's Labour Department, which investigated the matter but ultimately declined to prosecute Dow Jones after seeking legal advice from the Department of Justice.

In February 2025, Cheng launched a private prosecution against Dow Jones Publishing Co (Asia) Inc., the parent company of the Wall Street Journal, at the Eastern Magistrates' Courts. Dow Jones faced two charges under the city's Employment Ordinance: one count of doing an act calculated to prevent or deter an employee from exercising union participation rights, and one count of terminating employment over union participation. The company pleaded not guilty to both charges, each of which carries a maximum fine of HK$100,000.

Cheng was represented by Senior Counsel Nigel Kat and barrister Nicklaus Pannu-Yuon, with solicitor Adam Paul Clermont as instructing solicitor. Dow Jones was represented by Senior Counsel Benson Tsoi. The trial was heard before Principal Magistrate David Cheung over twelve days at the Eastern Magistrates' Courts.

During the trial, Cheng testified that her supervisor had told her that her participation in the HKJA election was "problematic" and that the matter needed to be discussed with Wall Street Journal management in New York and Dow Jones in-house lawyers. The court heard that Kerene Ko, a human resources director at Dow Jones, had informed Cheng by email that she "did not seek, and will not receive the company's approval" to pursue the HKJA chair role. The defence argued that the prosecution had not proven the individuals involved acted as the "directing mind and will" of the company, contending that any offence, if proven, would lie against the individuals rather than the corporate entity. Dow Jones also accused Cheng of abusing the criminal process and acting in bad faith, pointing to emails showing she had demanded HK$3 million as settlement or reinstatement with a formal apology. Cheng denied that financial compensation was her primary motivation, stating she wanted to hold employers accountable for violations of the law.

Senior Counsel Kat argued in closing submissions that an employee enjoys "far-reaching protection" from the Employment Ordinance, which prohibits employers from preventing, deterring, or firing a worker for union activities.

On 10 September 2026, Principal Magistrate David Cheung convicted Dow Jones of the first charge of deterring Cheng from exercising her union participation rights. The court acquitted the company on the second charge of terminating Cheng's employment over her union role, with the magistrate finding that the defence had raised sufficient reasonable doubt, as the possibility that the company dismissed Cheng as part of a genuine corporate restructuring could not be ruled out beyond a reasonable doubt. Speaking to reporters after the hearing, Cheng said her case had brought awareness of union suppression in Hong Kong and that employers had no right to require employees to consult them before joining a union. Sentencing is expected at a later date. The Wall Street Journal faces a maximum fine of HK$100,000. Dow Jones did not immediately respond to a request for comment following the verdict.

=== As chair of HKJA ===
During her time as chair of HKJA, Cheng has been the public face of the organisation, commenting on systemic harassment of journalists, mysterious cancellations of event spaces, arbitrary tax audits against journalists, the arrest of HK journalist Tang Ho-wing for sedition by national security police. The high profile sentencing of vocal China critic Jimmy Lai attracted widespread international condemnation, and silence from local press freedom advocates beyond Cheng's comment “I’m not free to speak my mind on the Apple Daily sentencing.”
