= The Wall Street Journal =

American business-focused daily newspaper

- It's Your Business

- Front page of the Journal on July 30, 2025
- Type: Daily newspaper
- Format: Broadsheet
- Owner: Dow Jones & Company
- Founders: Charles Dow; Edward Jones; Charles Bergstresser
- Publisher: Almar Latour
- Editor-in-chief: Emma Tucker
- Deputy editor: Aja Whitaker-Moore; David Crow
- Managing editor: Liz Harris
- Opinion editor: Paul Gigot
- Founded: July 8, 1889; 137 years ago
- Language: English
- Headquarters: 1211 Avenue of the Americas; New York City 10036, United States
- Country: United States
- Circulation: 4,538,000 news subscribers; 4,126,000 digital-only; 412,000 print + digital; (as of June 2025)
- ISSN: 0099-9660 (print); 1042-9840 (web)
- OCLC number: 781541372
- Website: wsj.com

The Wall Street Journal (WSJ), commonly known as the Journal, is an American newspaper based in Midtown Manhattan, New York City. It provides extensive coverage of news, especially business and finance, and operates on a subscription model that requires readers to pay for access to most articles and other content. The Journal is published six days a week by Dow Jones & Company, a division of News Corp.

As of 2025, The Wall Street Journal is the largest newspaper in the United States by print circulation, with about 412,000 print subscribers. It has more than four million digital subscribers, the second-most in the nation after The New York Times. The newspaper is one of the United States' newspapers of record. The first issue of the newspaper was published on July 8, 1889. The editorial page of the Journal is typically center-right in its positions, while its news reporting is more centrist. The newspaper has won 39 Pulitzer Prizes.

== History ==
=== Founding and 19th century ===
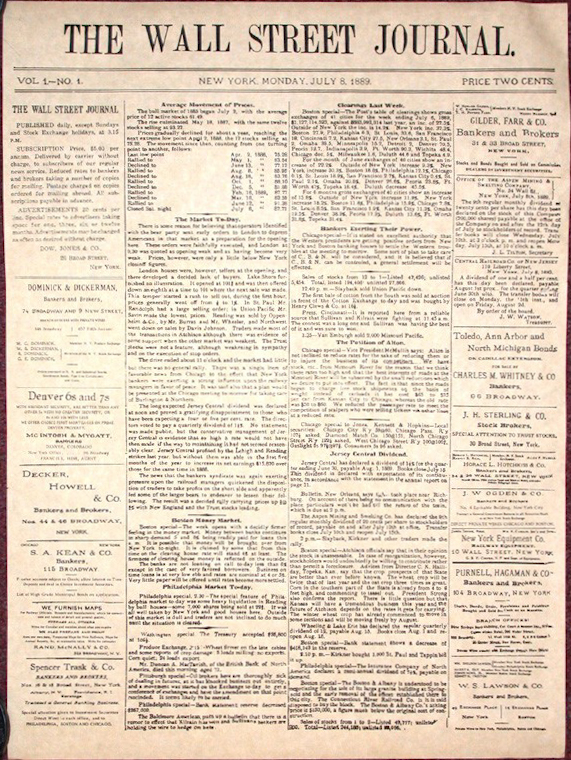
Front page of the first issue of The Wall Street Journal on July 8, 1889

A predecessor to The Wall Street Journal was the Kiernan News Agency founded by John J. Kiernan in 1869. In 1880, Kiernan hired Charles H. Dow and Edward D. Jones as reporters. On a recommendation of Collis Potter Huntington, Dow and Jones co-founded their own news service, Dow Jones & Company, with fellow Kiernan reporter Charles Bergstresser. Dow Jones was headquartered in the basement of 15 Wall Street, the same building as Kiernan's company next to the New York Stock Exchange Building.

The first products of Dow Jones & Company, the publisher of the Journal, were brief news bulletins, nicknamed flimsies, hand-delivered throughout the day to traders at the stock exchange. In 1883, they were aggregated in a printed daily summary called the Customers' Afternoon Letter, sold for $1.50 per month compared to the $15 a month Dow Jones bulletin service. Dow Jones opened its own printing press at 71 Broadway in 1885.

Beginning July 8, 1889, the Afternoon Letter was renamed The Wall Street Journal. The debut issue of the Journal was four pages long, with dimensions of 20 3/4 × 15 1/2 inches and cost of $0.02 per copy. In its early days, the Journal had "a tedious, blow-by-blow account of the day's business without benefit of editing," wrote Edward E. Scharff in 1986.

For nearly 40 years, the front page had a four-column format, with the middle two devoted to news briefs and the farther two filled with advertisements for brokerage services. The Journal focused on stories from news wires and listings of stocks and bonds, while occasionally covering sports or politics. One front-page story on the debut edition of The Wall Street Journal was a raw wire report about the boxing match between John L. Sullivan and Jake Kilrain, with varying accounts of the fight citing The Boston Globe, the Baltimore American, and anonymous sources. Seldom did The Wall Street Journal publish analysis or opinion articles in its early decades. In addition to a private wire to Boston, the Journal had reporters communicate via telegraph from Washington, Philadelphia, Chicago, Pittsburgh, Albany, and London.

In 1896, the Journal began publishing two separate Dow Jones stock indicies, the Dow Jones Industrial Average and Dow Jones Railroad Average. The first morning edition of the Journal was published on November 14, 1898. By the late 1890s, daily circulation reached 7,000.

Charles Dow wrote the first "Review and Outlook" column on April 21, 1899, a front-page editorial column explaining stock prices in terms of human nature; Dow's thinking would later be known as the Dow theory. Scharff regarded Dow's essays from 1899 to 1902 as "stock market classics".

=== 20th century ===
In the months before his death in 1902, Dow arranged to sell Dow Jones and the Journal to Clarence W. Barron, the Boston correspondent for the Journal since 1889, for $130,000 (equivalent to $4,837,500 in 2025). Because Barron had financial difficulties, his wife Jessie Waldron Barron made the $2,500 down payment to buy Dow Jones in 1902; Clarence would first own a Dow Jones share about ten years later.

Under Barron's ownership, Thomas F. Woodlock was editor of the Journal from 1902 to 1905. By the end of Woodlock's tenure, daily circulation for the Journal rose from 7,000 to 11,000. William Peter Hamilton became lead editorial writer in 1908, a time when the Journal began reflecting the views of Barron. Hamilton wrote what Scharff considered "daily sermons in support of free-market capitalism".

Barron and his predecessors were credited with creating an atmosphere of fearless, independent financial reporting—a novelty in the early days of business journalism. In 1921, Barron's, the United States's premier financial weekly, was founded. Scharff described the newspaper in the Barron era as "Wall Street's public defender" against regulatory efforts by the U.S. Congress. Circulation continued to rise, reaching 18,750 to 1920 and 52,000 briefly in 1928, but did not exceed that of its main competitor, The Magazine of Wall Street, which was the leading financial publication of the era. Barron died in 1928, a year before Black Tuesday, the stock market crash that greatly affected the Great Depression in the United States. Barron's descendants, the Bancroft family, would continue to control the company until 2007.

The Wall Street Crash of 1929 would be yet another challenge to the Journal on top of Barron's death. William Peter Hamilton died of pneumonia on December 9, 1929, aged 63. Circulation of the Journal, having surpassed 50,000 in 1928, dropped below 28,000 in the 1930s, and the newspaper downsized from 28 to 16 pages in the 1930s as well. Dow Jones president Hugh Bancroft retired in 1932; following his death in 1933, his widow Jane Waldron Bancroft appointed Kenneth Craven "Casey" Hogate as new company president. Hogate envisioned expanding the scope of the Journal to a "more general business paper" beyond stock and bond numbers.

Expanding westward, The Wall Street Journal debuted a West Coast edition on October 21, 1929, The Wall Street Journal Pacific Coast Edition. The Pacific Coast Edition focused on California businesses and replicated some items from the regular Wall Street Journal; however, its circulation never exceeded 3,000, and the Great Depression led numerous subscription cancellations.

By 1931, Bernard Kilgore became news editor for The Wall Street Journal, having joined the Journal copy desk in 1929. He began writing a column for the Pacific Coast Edition called "Dear George", a feature explaining obscure financial topics in simpler, plain rhetoric. "Dear George" sharply contrasted with other Wall Street Journal articles that relied on jargon that was incomprehensible even to its own reporters. The Eastern edition of the Journal began carrying "Dear George", and beginning in 1932, Kilgore wrote "Dear George" three times a week from New York for the Journal. Then in 1934, Kilgore began writing a daily news digest "What's News" for the Journal front page. Kilgore's writings attracted the attention of the White House; President Franklin D. Roosevelt publicly recommended Kilgore's work about pension payments for World War I veterans and a Supreme Court decision on the National Industrial Recovery Act of 1933. However, the Journal continued to struggle financially, with circulation stagnant at 32,000 in 1940. Most editions were only 12 to 14 pages long, and Dow Jones made only $69,000 of profits on $2 million of revenue, mostly due to its news ticker. Scharff observed a lack of coverage about a possible U.S. role in World War II.

In the 1940s, Dow Jones took steps to restructure the Journal. Kilgore was named managing editor of the Journal in 1941 and Dow Jones CEO in 1945. Scharff described Kilgore's approach to journalism: "A Journal story had to satisfy its sophisticated readership, but it also had to be clear enough not to discourage neophytes." Additionally, Kilgore aimed to have the newspaper appeal to a national audience, by making the East Coast and West Coast editions of the Journal more homogeneous. Until printing presses and reporting bureaus could be opened on location, photographs could not be included in the Journal.

In 1947, the paper won its first Pulitzer Prize for William Henry Grimes's editorials. Also in May 1947, the Journal launched a Southwest edition based in Dallas. The newspaper also added a new slogan in 1949: "Everywhere, Men Who Get Ahead in Business Read The Wall Street Journal." Circulation grew by nearly four-fold, from 32,000 in 1940 to 140,000 in 1949; however, Kilgore's editorial reforms of the Journal had not yet entered popular understanding.

The first major journalism award for the Journal was a Sigma Delta Chi public service award, for stories in late 1952 exposing links between Empire Mail Order and organized crime. These stories followed news that Howard Hughes sold RKO Pictures to Empire Mail Order. Circulation of the Journal continued increasing throughout the 1950s, to 205,000 in 1951, 400,000 in 1955, and over 500,000 by 1957.

Warren H. Phillips became managing editor of The Wall Street Journal in 1957 after being promoted from Chicago bureau manager. Phillips was Jewish, in contrast to the largely midwestern, WASP management of the Journal at the time. Phillips, a former socialist, shifted his political views in the 1950s to reflect social liberalism and fiscal conservatism. Under Phillips, the Journal provided in-depth coverage of the civil rights movement, on the grounds that it "was something that the average businessman needed to know about". For instance, Journal coverage of the Little Rock Central High School integration crisis went beyond the largely visual, emotional elements on newspapers and television, in depicting local citizens as supportive of integration in contrast to Governor Orval Faubus and other local politicians.

During the 1962–1963 New York City newspaper strike, the Journal was the only daily newspaper to continue printing in New York City; however, after the strike, Kilgore ordered the printing presses moved from New York to Chicopee, Massachusetts effective July 1, 1963. Although Kilgore did not publicly explain his rationale then, Scharff wrote in 1986 that the move resulted from feuds between Dow Jones and the printer's union.

By Kilgore's death in 1967, Wall Street Journal circulation exceeded one million. In 1967, Dow Jones Newswires began a major expansion outside of the United States ultimately placing its journalists in every major financial center in Europe, Asia, Latin America, Australia, and Africa. In 1970, Dow Jones bought the Ottaway newspaper chain, which at the time comprised nine dailies and three Sunday newspapers. Later, the name was changed to Dow Jones Local Media Group. The first strike affecting a Journal printing plant was a three-day strike at Silver Spring, Maryland, in 1967; that would be followed by a weeklong strike by truck drivers at the South Brunswick, New Jersey, in 1970.

Video of U.S. President Ronald Reagan interviewed by WSJ in the Oval Office in February 1985

The period from 1971 to 1997 brought about a series of launches, acquisitions, and joint ventures, including "Factiva", The Wall Street Journal Asia, The Wall Street Journal Europe, the WSJ.com website, Dow Jones Indexes, MarketWatch, and "WSJ Weekend Edition". In 2007, News Corp. acquired Dow Jones. WSJ., a luxury lifestyle magazine, was launched in 2008.

A complement to the print newspaper, The Wall Street Journal Online, was launched in 1996 and has allowed access only by subscription from the beginning. A weekly (later daily) crossword edited by Mike Shenk was introduced in 1998.

=== 2000-2007 ===
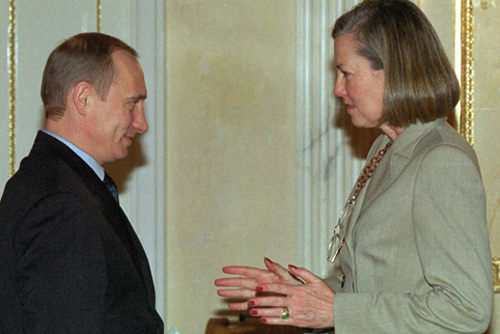
Vladimir Putin with Wall Street Journal correspondent Karen Elliott House in 2002

In 2003, Dow Jones began to integrate reporting of the Journal's print and online subscribers together in Audit Bureau of Circulations statements. In 2007, it was commonly believed to be the largest paid-subscription news site on the Web, with 980,000 paid subscribers. Since then, digital subscription has risen to 1.3 million as of September 2018, falling to number two behind The New York Times with 3 million digital subscriptions. In May 2008, an annual subscription to the digital edition of The Wall Street Journal cost $119 for those who do not have subscriptions to the print edition. By June 2013, the monthly cost for a subscription to the online edition was $22.99, or $275.88 annually, excluding introductory offers. Digital subscription rates increased dramatically to $443.88 per year as its popularity increased over print, with first-time subscribers paying $187.20 per year.

On November 30, 2004, Oasys Mobile and The Wall Street Journal released an app that would allow users to access content from The Wall Street Journal Online via their mobile phones.

In September 2005, the Journal launched a weekend edition, delivered to all subscribers, which marked a return to Saturday publication after a lapse of some 50 years. The move was designed in part to attract more consumer advertising.

In 2005, the Journal reported a readership profile of about 60 percent top management, an average income of $191,000, an average household net worth of $2.1 million, and an average age of 55.

In 2007, the Journal launched a worldwide expansion of its website to include major foreign-language editions. The paper had also shown an interest in buying the rival Financial Times.

=== 2007 and onwards ===
==== News Corporation and News Corp Acquisition ====
On May 2, 2007, News Corporation made an unsolicited takeover bid for Dow Jones, offering $60 per share for stock that had been selling for $36.33 per share. The Bancroft family, which controlled more than 60% of the voting stock, at first rejected the offer, but later reconsidered its position.

Three months later, on August 1, 2007, News Corporation and Dow Jones entered into a definitive merger agreement. The $5 billion sale added The Wall Street Journal to Rupert Murdoch's news empire, which already included Fox News Channel, Fox Business Network, London's The Times, the New York Post, and the Fox flagship station WNYW (Channel 5) and MyNetworkTV flagship WWOR (Channel 9).

On December 13, 2007, shareholders representing more than 60 percent of Dow Jones's voting stock approved the company's acquisition by News Corporation.

In an editorial page column, publisher L. Gordon Crovitz said the Bancrofts and News Corporation had agreed that the Journal's news and opinion sections would preserve their editorial independence from their new corporate parent.

A special committee was established to oversee the paper's editorial integrity. When the managing editor Marcus Brauchli resigned on April 22, 2008, the committee said that News Corporation had violated its agreement by not notifying the committee earlier. However, Brauchli said he believed that new owners should appoint their own editor.

A 2007 Journal article quoted charges that Murdoch had made and broken similar promises in the past. One large shareholder commented that Murdoch has long "expressed his personal, political and business biases through his newspapers and television stations". Former Times assistant editor Fred Emery remembers an incident when "Mr. Murdoch called him into his office in March 1982 and said he was considering firing Times editor Harold Evans. Mr. Emery says he reminded Mr. Murdoch of his promise that editors couldn't be fired without the independent directors' approval. 'God, you don't take all that seriously, do you?' Mr. Murdoch answered, according to Mr. Emery." Murdoch eventually forced out Evans. The Journal, along with its parent Dow Jones & Company, was among the businesses News Corporation spun off in 2013 as the new News Corp.

==== Other ====
In 2011, The Guardian found evidence that the Journal had artificially inflated its European sales numbers, by paying Executive Learning Partnership for purchasing 16% of European sales. These inflated sales numbers then enabled the Journal to charge similarly inflated advertising rates, as the advertisers would think that they reached more readers than they actually did. In addition, the Journal agreed to run "articles" featuring Executive Learning Partnership, presented as news, but effectively advertising. The case came to light after a Belgian Wall Street Journal employee, Gert Van Mol, informed Dow Jones CEO Les Hinton about the questionable practice. As a result, the then Wall Street Journal Europe CEO and Publisher Andrew Langhoff was fired after it was found out he personally pressured journalists into covering one of the newspaper's business partners involved in the issue. Since September 2011, all the online articles that resulted from the ethical wrongdoing carry a Wall Street Journal disclaimer informing the readers about the circumstances in which they were created.

As of 2012, The Wall Street Journal had a global news staff of around 2,000 journalists in 85 news bureaus across 51 countries. As of 2012, it had 26 printing plants. Its Asia headquarters is in Hong Kong, but will move to Singapore after it stated it would do so in 2024. In November 2016, in an effort to cut costs, the Journal's editor-in-chief, Gerard Baker, announced layoffs of staff and consolidation of its print sections. The new "Business & Finance" section combined the former "Business & Tech" and "Money & Investing" sections. The new "Life & Arts" section took the place of "Personal Journal" and "Arena". In addition, the Journal's "Greater New York" coverage was reduced and moved to the main section of paper. The section was shuttered on July 9, 2021.

A 2018 survey conducted by Gallup and the Knight Foundation found that The Wall Street Journal was considered the third most-accurate and fourth most-unbiased news organization among the general public, tenth among Democrats, and second among Republicans. In an October 2018 Simmons Research survey of 38 news organizations, The Wall Street Journal was ranked the most trusted news organization by Americans. Joshua Benton of the Nieman Journalism Lab at Harvard University wrote that the paper's "combination of respected news pages and conservative editorial pages seem to be a magic formula for generating trust across the ideological spectrum."

From 2019 through 2022, the Journal partnered with Facebook to provide content for the social-media site's "News Tab". Facebook paid the Journal in excess of $10 million during that period, terminating the relationship as part of a broader shift away from news content.

On June 13, 2022, the Journal launched a product review website called Buy Side. The website remains free and has a distinct team from the Journal newsroom.

In March 2023, reporter Evan Gershkovich was arrested in Russia, then tried and convicted for spying and espionage. The journal campaigned for Gershkovich's release which was secured in a white-house brokered prisoner exchange in August 2024.

In February 2024, the Journal laid off about 20 employees, primarily economics reporters based in Washington, D.C. Moving forward, those beats will be covered by the newspaper's New York-based business team. The next month the paper laid off another five people from its standards and ethics team. In April, the paper laid off at least 11 people from its video and social media desks. In May, the Journal cut six editorial staff positions from its Hong Kong bureau and another two reporter jobs in Singapore as part of a shift in the region from Hong Kong to Singapore. More staff were laid off a few weeks later amid further restructuring, including at least eight reporters. ==== Deterring Press Unionionism and Conviction ====

For additional details see 2026 criminal conviction of the Wall Street Journal for anti-union activity in Hong Kong

In June 2024 editors at the Wall Street Journal demanded that journalist Selina Cheng withdraw from participation in the Hong Kong Journalists Association. Cheng did not withdraw and was elected to the leadership role. In July 2024, the paper's chief editor Gordon Fairclough traveled to Hong Kong and fired her from her role at the Journal. Cheng claimed that the Wall Street Journal had fired her to avoid being seen as advocating press freedom in the city. The paper's actions against Cheng attracted criticism from media organisations, press unions and human rights proponents across the globe. In July 2024, the NewsGuild-CWA and Independent Association of Publishers' Employees, the union for Dow Jones, expressed their support for Cheng.

In February 2025, Cheng launched a private prosecution against her employer, Dow Jones Publishing Co. (Asia) Inc, for violations of the city's Employment Ordinance: one count of doing an act calculated to prevent or deter an employee from exercising union participation rights, and one count of terminating employment over union participation. Dow Jones pleaded not guilty to both charges. On 10 September 2026, her employer was convicted of the first charge of deterring Cheng from exercising her union participation rights. The court acquitted the company on the second charge of terminating Cheng's employment over her union role, with the magistrate finding that the possibility that the company dismissed Cheng as part of a genuine corporate restructuring could not be ruled out beyond a reasonable doubt. The maximum penalty fine for the violation was a fine of 100,000 Hong Kong dollars (about $12,750 US at the time of the trial).

=== Miscellaneous milestones ===
- WSJ Noted., a monthly digital magazine, launches on June 30, 2020, in a bid to attract younger readers.
- Reaches 3 million subscribers in May 2020
- WSJ Live became available on mobile devices in September 2011.
- WSJ Weekend, the weekend newspaper, expanded September 2010, with two new sections: "Off Duty" and "Review".
- "Greater New York", a stand-alone, full-color section dedicated to the New York metro area, ran from April 2010 until July 2021.
- The Wall Street Journal's San Francisco Bay Area Edition, which focuses on local news and events, launched on November 5, 2009, appearing locally each Thursday in the print Journal and every day online at WSJ.com/SF.
- WSJ Weekend, formerly called Saturday's Weekend Edition: September 2005.
- Launch of Today's Journal, which included both the addition of Personal Journal and color capacity to the Journal: April 2002.
- Launch of The Wall Street Journal Sunday: September 12, 1999. A four-page print supplement of original investing news, market reports and personal-finance advice that ran in the business sections of other U.S. newspapers. WSJ Sunday circulation peaked in 2005 with 84 newspapers reaching nearly 11 million homes. The publication ceased on February 7, 2015.
- Friday Journal, formerly called First Weekend Journal: March 20, 1998.
- WSJ.com launched in April 1996.
- First three-section Journal: October 1988.
- First two-section Journal: June 1980.

== Content ==
The nameplate is unique in having a period at the end.

=== Format and Design changes ===
Front-page advertising in the Journal was re-introduced on September 5, 2006. This followed similar introductions in the European and Asian editions in late 2005.

After presenting nearly identical front-page layouts for half a century – always six columns, with the day's top stories in the first and sixth columns, "What's News" digest in the second and third, the "A-hed" feature story in the fourth (with 'hed' being jargon for headline) and themed weekly reports in the fifth column – the paper in 2007 decreased its broadsheet width from 15 to 12 inches while keeping the length at 22 3/4 inches, to save newsprint costs. News design consultant Mario García collaborated on the changes. Dow Jones said it would save $18 million a year in newsprint costs across all The Wall Street Journal papers. This move eliminated one column of print, pushing the "A-hed" out of its traditional location (though the paper now usually includes a quirky feature story on the right side of the front page, sandwiched among the lead stories).

The paper uses ink dot drawings called hedcuts, introduced in 1979 and originally created by Kevin Sprouls, in addition to photographs, a method of illustration considered a consistent visual signature of the paper. the Journal still heavily employs the use of caricatures, including those by illustrator Ken Fallin, such as when Peggy Noonan memorialized then-recently deceased newsman Tim Russert. The use of color photographs and graphics has become increasingly common in recent years with the addition of more "lifestyle" sections.

The daily was awarded by the Society for News Design World's Best Designed Newspaper award for 1994 and 1997.

=== Format and Features ===
Since 1980, the Journal has been published in multiple sections. The Journal increased its maximum issue length to 96 pages, including up to 24 color pages, in 2002.

Regularly scheduled sections are:

- Section One: Every day; corporate news, as well as political and economic reporting and the opinion pages
- Marketplace: Monday through Friday; coverage of health, technology, media, and marketing industries (the second section was launched June 23, 1980)
- Money and Investing: Every day; covers and analyzes international financial markets (the third section was launched October 3, 1988)
- Personal Journal: Published Tuesday through Thursday; covers personal investments, careers and cultural pursuits (the section was introduced April 9, 2002)
- Off Duty: Published Saturdays in WSJ Weekend; focuses on fashion, food, design, travel and gear/tech. The section was launched September 25, 2010.
- Review: Published Saturdays in WSJ Weekend; focuses on essays, commentary, reviews and ideas. The section was launched September 25, 2010.
- Mansion: Published Fridays, focuses on high-end real estate. The section was launched October 5, 2012.
- WSJ Magazine: Launched in 2008 as a quarterly, this luxury magazine supplement distributed within the U.S., European and Asian editions of The Wall Street Journal grew to 12 issues per year in 2014.

In addition, several columnists contribute regular features to the Journal opinion page:

- Mondays: Americas by Mary O'Grady
- Wednesdays: Business World by Holman W. Jenkins Jr.
- Thursdays: Wonder Land by Daniel Henninger
- Fridays: Potomac Watch by Kimberley Strassel
- Weekend Edition: Rule of Law, The Weekend Interview (variety of authors), Declarations by Peggy Noonan

In addition to editorials and columns from the printed newspaper, wsj.com carries two daily web-only opinion columns:

- Best of the Web Today by James Taranto, the editor of the former OpinionJournal.com website (no subscription required).
- Political Diary edited by Holman W. Jenkins Jr. and featuring John Fund (separate subscription required).

In addition to these regular opinion pieces, on Fridays the Journal publishes a religion-themed op-ed, titled "Houses of Worship", written by a different author each week. Authors range from the Dalai Lama to cardinals.

==== Style & Substance ====
Style & Substance is a monthly bulletin on English language usage. Each issue discusses specific language issues from the perspective of the WSJ's copyeditors according to the newspaper's internal stylebook. The first issue of Style & Substance was published in 1987 under the direction of front page editor Paul R. Martin. Front page editor Bill Power and online editor Jennifer Hicks succeeded him in 2013. The Journal announces major stylistic changes through the bulletin, such as the newspaper's abandonment of courtesy titles in 2023.

==== WSJ. ====
WSJ. is The Wall Street Journal's luxury lifestyle magazine. Its coverage spans art, fashion, entertainment, design, food, architecture, travel and more. Sarah Ball is Editor in Chief and Omblyne Pelier is Publisher.

Launched as a quarterly in 2008, the magazine grew to 12 issues a year for 2014. The magazine is inserted into the weekend U.S. edition of The Wall Street Journal and is available on WSJ.com and in the newspaper's iPad app.

Penélope Cruz, Carmelo Anthony, Woody Allen, Scarlett Johansson, Emilia Clarke, Daft Punk, and Gisele Bündchen have all been featured on the cover.

In 2012, the magazine launched its Innovator Awards program. An extension of the November Innovators issue, the awards ceremony, held in New York City at Museum of Modern Art, honors visionaries across the fields of design, fashion, architecture, humanitarianism, art and technology.

In 2013, Adweek named WSJ. the "Hottest Lifestyle Magazine of the Year" in its annual Hot List.

==== OpinionJournal.com ====
OpinionJournal.com
- Website type: News and opinion
- Available in: English
- Owner: The Wall Street Journal
- Creator: The Wall Street Journal
- Revenue: N/A
- Website: opinionjournal.com
- Commercial: Yes
- Registration: N/A
- Current status: Redirects to wsj.com/news/opinion

OpinionJournal.com was a website featuring content from the editorial pages of The Wall Street Journal. It existed separately from the news content at wsj.com until January 2008, when it was merged into the main website. The editorials (titled "Review & Outlook") reflected The Journal's conservative political editorial line, as did its regular columnists, who included Peggy Noonan, John Fund, and Daniel Henninger.

==== WSJ Noted. ====
On June 30, 2020, the Journal launched WSJ Noted., a monthly digital "news and culture" magazine for subscribers aged 18–34 in a bid to attract a younger audience to the Journal. The magazine has a group of some 7,000 young adults who are invited to preview content, provide feedback, and join Q&As with Noted staff.

== Editorial board ==
The Wall Street Journal editorial board members oversee the Journal's editorial page, dictating the tone and direction of the newspaper's opinion section. The Wall Street Journal does not provide details on the exact duties of board members.

Every Saturday and Sunday, three editorial page writers and host Paul Gigot, editor of the editorial page, appear on Fox News Channel's Journal Editorial Report, where they discuss current issues with a variety of guests. As editors of the editorial page, Vermont C. Royster (1958–1971) and Robert Bartley (1972–2000) provided a conservative interpretation of the news on a daily basis.

Contrasts have been noted between the Journal's news reporting and its editorial pages. "While Journal reporters keep busy informing readers," wrote one reporter in 1982, "Journal editorial writers put forth views that often contradict the paper's best reporting and news analysis." Two summaries published in 1995 by the progressive blog Fairness and Accuracy in Reporting, and in 1996 by the Columbia Journalism Review criticized the Journal's editorial page for inaccuracy during the 1980s and 1990s. One reference work in 2011 described the editorial pages as "rigidly neoconservative" while noting that the news coverage "has enjoyed a sterling reputation among readers of all political stripes".

In July 2020, more than 280 Journal journalists and Dow Jones staff members wrote a letter to new publisher Almar Latour to criticize the opinion pages' "lack of fact-checking and transparency, and its apparent disregard for evidence", adding that "opinion articles often make assertions that are contradicted by WSJ reporting." The editorial board responded that its opinion pages "won't wilt under cancel-culture pressure" and that the objective of the editorial content is to be independent of the Journal's news content and offer alternative views to "the uniform progressive views that dominate nearly all of today's media." The board's response did not address issues regarding fact-checking that had been raised in the letter.

=== Editorial positions ===
==== Economic ====
In the 1900s, the Journal supported the antitrust efforts of President Theodore Roosevelt. However, after the ownership change from Dow to Barron, the Journal became far more unequivocally supportive of free-market economics in the 1920s. One editorial in March 1928 criticized Congressional efforts to regulate the securities industry: "People who know nothing about credit, surplus bank funds, collateral, call loans or anything else germane to the question profess to be terrified when the Stock Exchange loans attain the figure of $4 billion or more."

On April 14, 1932, the Journal published a commentary by former editor Thomas F. Woodlock criticizing the Glass–Steagall banking regulation bill: "There are those who cannot endure the sight of autonomous securities markets beyond the control of legislatures, bureaucrats, and, in fact, of courts."

In the 1980s, the newspaper's editorial page was particularly influential as the leading voice for supply-side economics. Under the editorship of Robert L. Bartley, it expounded at length on economic concepts such as the Laffer curve, and how a decrease in certain marginal tax rates and the capital gains tax could allegedly increase overall tax revenue by generating more economic activity.

In the economic argument of exchange rate regimes (one of the most divisive issues among economists), the Journal has a tendency to support fixed exchange rates over floating exchange rates.

==== Political ====
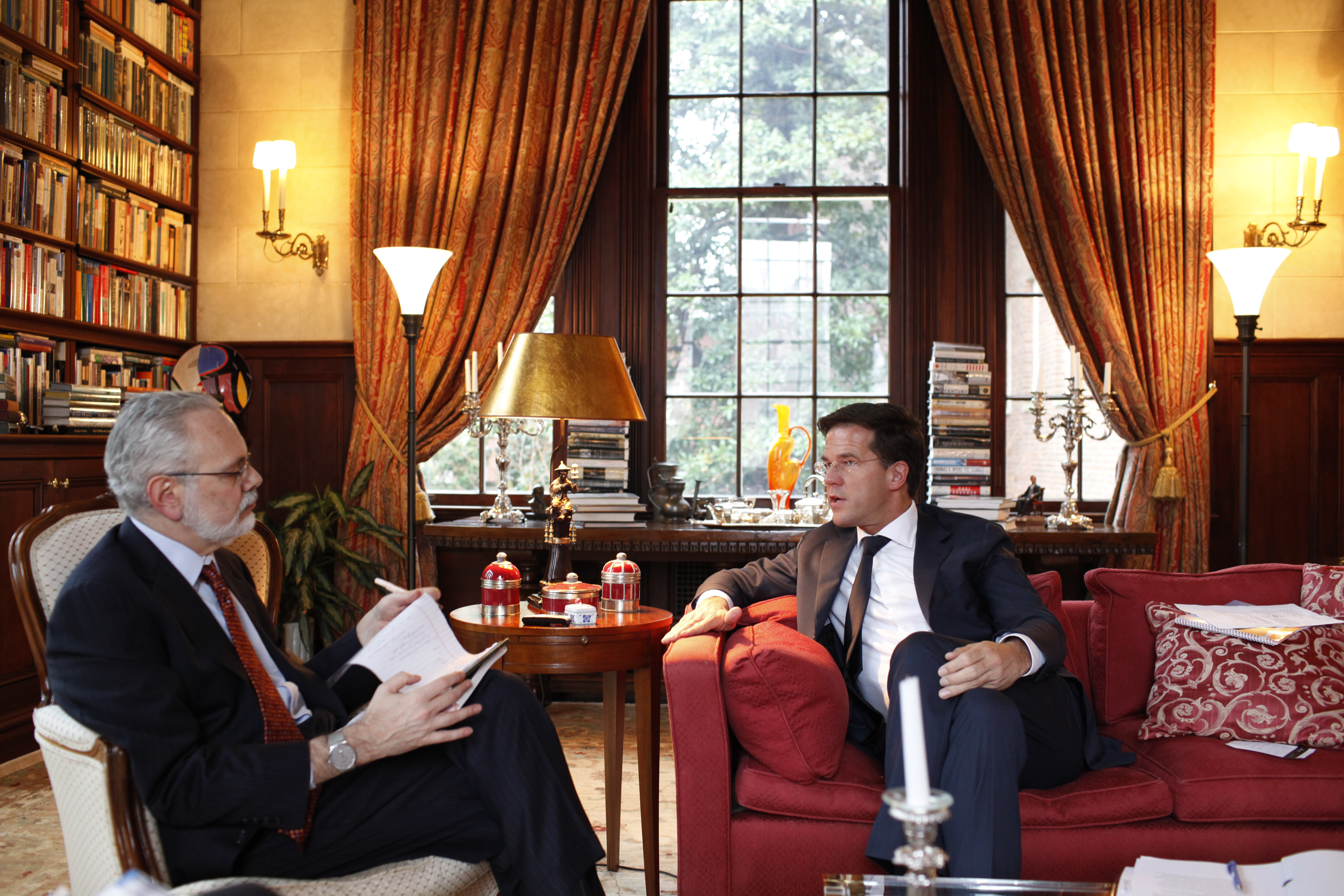
Mark Rutte (on right), prime minister of the Netherlands, being interviewed by The Journal in 2011

The Journal's editorial pages and columns, run separately from the news pages, have a conservative bent and are highly influential in establishment conservative circles. Despite this, the Journal refrains from endorsing candidates and has not endorsed a candidate since 1928.

The editorial board has long argued for a pro-business immigration policy.

The Journal's editorial page was seen as critical of many aspects of Barack Obama's presidency. In particular, it has been a prominent critic of the Affordable Care Act legislation passed in 2010, and has featured many opinion columns attacking various aspects of the bill. The Journal's editorial page has also criticized the Obama administration's energy policies and foreign policy.

On October 25, 2017, the editorial board called for Special Counsel Robert Mueller to resign from the investigation into Russian interference in the 2016 United States elections and accused Hillary Clinton's 2016 presidential campaign of colluding with Russia. In December 2017, the editorial board repeated its calls for Mueller's resignation. The editorials by the editorial board caused fractures within The Wall Street Journal, as reporters say that the editorials undermine the paper's credibility.

In October 2021, the Journal published a letter from former President Donald Trump in the Letters to the Editor section of the editorial pages. Other news sources described the contents of the letter as false and debunked claims about the 2020 presidential election. The next day, the editorial board published their own critique of Trump's letter.

==== Scientific ====
The Journal editorial pages were described as a "forum for climate change denial" in 2011 due to columns that attacked climate scientists and accused them of engaging in fraud. A 2011 study found that the Journal was alone among major American print news media in how, mainly in its editorial pages, it adopted a false balance that overplayed the uncertainty in climate science or denied anthropogenic climate change altogether. In 2013, the editorial board and other opinion writers vocally criticized President Obama's plan to address climate change, mostly without mentioning climate science. A 2015 study found The Wall Street Journal was the newspaper that was least likely to present negative effects of global warming among several newspapers. It was also the most likely to present negative economic framing when discussing climate change mitigation policies, tending to take the stance that the cost of such policies generally outweighs their benefit. Climate Feedback, a fact-checking website on media coverage of climate science, determined that multiple opinion articles range between "low" and "very low" in terms of scientific credibility.

In the 1980s and 1990s, the Journal published numerous opinion columns opposing and misrepresenting the scientific consensus on the harms of second-hand smoke, acid rain, and ozone depletion, in addition to public policy efforts to curb pesticides and asbestos. The Journal later recognized that efforts to curb acid rain through cap-and-trade had been successful, a decade after the Clean Air Act Amendments.

== Political views ==
The Journal's reporting has been described as "small-c conservatism". Some of the Journal's former editors and reporters, such as Sarah Ellison (a Washington Post reporter as of October 2025), say that the paper has adopted a more conservative tone since Rupert Murdoch's purchase.

=== Bias in news pages ===
==== Pre-Murdoch ownership ====
Its editors stress the independence and impartiality of their reporters. According to CNN in 2007, the Journal's "newsroom staff has a reputation for non-partisan reporting." Ben Smith of the New York Times described the Journal's news reporting as "small-c [conservative]", and noted that its readership leans further to the right than that of other major newspapers.

Under the ownership of Clarence W. Barron, the Journal generally restricted editorializing to its opinion pages, but a 1922 series of news articles described the organized labor movement as having "one of the most sordid records of humanity".

In a 2004 study, Tim Groseclose and Jeffrey Milyo argue the Journal's news pages have a pro-liberal bias because they more often quote liberal think tanks. They calculated the ideological attitude of news reports in 20 media outlets by counting the frequency they cited particular think tanks and comparing that to the frequency that legislators cited the same think tanks. They found that the news reporting of the Journal was the most liberal (more liberal than NPR or The New York Times). The study did not factor in editorials. Mark Liberman criticized the model used to calculate bias in the study and argued that the model unequally affected liberals and conservatives and that "the model starts with a very peculiar assumption about the relationship between political opinion and the choice of authorities to cite." The authors assume that "think tank ideology ... only matters to liberals."

The company's planned and eventual acquisition by News Corp in 2007 led to significant media criticism and discussion about whether the news pages would exhibit a rightward slant under Rupert Murdoch. An August 1, 2007, editorial responded to the questions by asserting that Murdoch intended to "maintain the values and integrity of the Journal".

==== During Trump presidency ====
In 2016 and 2017, the Journal leadership under Baker came under fire from staff members and media critics, who viewed the paper's coverage of President Donald Trump as too timid. Particularly controversial was the Journal's November 2016 front-page headline that repeated Trump's false claim that "millions of people" had voted illegally in the election, only noting that the statement was "without corroboration".

Also controversial was a January 2017 note from Baker to Journal editors, directing them to avoid using the phrase "seven majority-Muslim countries" when writing about Trump's executive order on travel and immigration; Baker later sent a follow-up note "clarifying that there was 'no ban'" on the phrase, "but that the publication should 'always be careful that this term is not offered as the only description of the countries covered under the ban.'"

At a town-hall-style meeting with Journal staff in February 2017, Baker defended the paper's coverage, saying that it was objective and protected the paper from being "dragged into the political process" through a dispute with the Trump administration.

On February 19, 2020, China announced the revoking of the press credentials of three Wall Street Journal reporters based in Beijing. China accused the paper of failing to apologize for publishing articles that criticized China's efforts to fight the COVID-19 pandemic, and failing to investigate and punish those responsible.

In June 2020, following the murder of George Floyd and subsequent protests, journalists at the Journal sent a letter to editor in chief Matt Murray demanding changes to the way the paper covers race, policing and finance. The reporters stated that they "frequently meet resistance when trying to reflect the accounts and voices of workers, residents or customers, with some editors voicing heightened skepticism of those sources' credibility compared with executives, government officials or other entities".

== Notable stories ==
The Journal has won 39 Pulitzer Prizes in its history. Staff journalists who led some of the newspaper's best-known coverage teams have later published books that summarized and extended their reporting.

=== 1939: World War I battleships ===
In 1939, Vermont C. Royster wrote a series of articles showing the length of time required for World War I battleships to be ready for duty. One story summarized the process of manufacturing armor plates. The U.S. Navy accused Royster, then a Naval Reserve officer, of using classified information for his reporting. Royster said that he obtained the information from Encyclopedia Britannica.

=== 1952: Empire Mail Order ===
In October 1952, the Chicago bureau of the Journal received a press release announcing that Howard Hughes sold his controlling interest in RKO Pictures to the Empire Mail Order Company. Managing editor Henry Gemmill led reporting efforts that resulted in articles in late 1952 exposing links between Empire Mail Order and organized crime. Following these stories, Hughes canceled the RKO sale. These stories also led to the first major industry award for the Journal, a Sigma Delta Chi public service award for these stories.

=== 1954: Automobile models ===
On May 28, 1954, the Journal published a front-page story by John Williams revealing designs of 1955 automobiles by Ford, Pontiac, and other auto makers. Williams had talked to factory workers and auto executives for several weeks. The story revealed that the cars would have larger engines and wrap-around windshields. The inclusion of drawings was notable for being a rare use of graphics by the Journal of the time. Nearly a week later, General Motors canceled its nearly $250,000 in advertising with the Journal; GM president Harlow Curtice accused the Journal of copyright infringement and breach of confidentiality. Richard Tofel of ProPublica commented on this story in 2015: "The little-remembered incident helped establish the notion that news organizations could and should preserve their independence from advertisers."

=== 1973: Spiro Agnew bribery ===
On August 7, 1973, in an article by Jerry Landauer, the Journal was the first publication to report that U.S. Vice President Spiro Agnew was under federal investigation on bribery, extortion, and tax fraud charges. Agnew released a statement confirming the investigation on the night before the Journal article was published. After pleading no contest to one charge of income tax evasion, Agnew was sentenced to a $10,000 fine and three-year suspended jail sentence. On the same day of his sentencing, Agnew resigned as vice president on October 10, 1973.

=== 1984: CIA mining in Nicaragua ===
On April 6, 1984, the Journal first revealed, in a story by David Rogers, that the Central Intelligence Agency had placed acoustic mines on harbors in Nicaragua, following initial belief that opponents of the Sandinista government had been responsible. As Lou Cannon recounted in his 1991 book President Reagan: The Role of a Lifetime, this story led to "an international outcry". Nearly week after this Journal story, in a speech on the Senate floor and a stern letter to CIA director William J. Casey, U.S. Senator Barry Goldwater (Republican of Arizona) condemned the lack of disclosure by the Reagan administration about the mining actions. By an 84–12 margin, the Senate passed a "sense of the Congress" resolution introduced by Senator Ted Kennedy (Democrat of Massachusetts) "against the mining of Nicaraguan ports and the withdrawal of World Court jurisdiction over Central America."

=== 1987: RJR Nabisco buyout ===
In 1987, a bidding war ensued between several financial firms for tobacco and food giant RJR Nabisco. Bryan Burrough and John Helyar documented the events in more than two dozen Journal articles. Burrough and Helyar later used these articles as the basis of a bestselling book, Barbarians at the Gate: The Fall of RJR Nabisco, which was turned into a film for HBO.

=== 1988: Insider trading ===
In the 1980s, then-Journal reporter James B. Stewart brought national attention to the illegal practice of insider trading. He was awarded the Pulitzer Prize in explanatory journalism in 1988, which he shared with Daniel Hertzberg, who went on to serve as the paper's senior deputy managing editor before resigning in 2009. Stewart expanded on this theme in his 1991 book, Den of Thieves.

=== 1997: AIDS treatment ===
David Sanford, a Page One features editor who was infected with HIV in 1982 in a bathhouse, wrote a front-page personal account of how, with the assistance of improved treatments for HIV, he went from planning his death to planning his retirement. He and six other reporters wrote about the new treatments, political and economic issues, and won the 1997 Pulitzer Prize for National Reporting about AIDS.

=== 2000: Enron ===
Jonathan Weil, a reporter at the Dallas bureau of The Wall Street Journal, is credited with first breaking the story of financial abuses at Enron in September 2000. Rebecca Smith and John R. Emshwiller reported on the story regularly, and wrote a book, 24 Days. In October 2021, the Journal released Bad Bets, a podcast that recounted the papers reporting on Enron.

=== 2001: 9/11 ===
The Journal claims to have sent the first news report, on the Dow Jones wire, of a plane crashing into the World Trade Center on September 11, 2001. Its headquarters, at One World Financial Center, was severely damaged by the collapse of the World Trade Center just across the street. Top editors worried that they might miss publishing the first issue for the first time in the paper's 112-year history. They relocated to a makeshift office at an editor's home, while sending most of the staff to Dow Jones's South Brunswick Township, New Jersey, corporate campus. The paper was on the stands the next day, albeit in scaled-down form. The front page included a first-hand account of the Twin Towers' collapse written by then-Foreign Editor John Bussey. Holed up in a ninth-floor office next to the towers, he phoned in live reports to CNBC as the towers burned. He narrowly escaped serious injury when the first tower collapsed, shattering all the windows in the Journal's offices and filling them with dust and debris. The Journal won a 2002 Pulitzer Prize in Breaking News Reporting for that day's stories.

The Journal subsequently conducted a worldwide investigation of the causes and significance of 9/11, using contacts it had developed while covering business in the Arab world. In Kabul, Afghanistan, reporters Alan Cullison and Andrew Higgins bought a pair of looted computers that Al Qaeda leaders had used to plan assassinations, chemical and biological attacks, and mundane daily activities. The encrypted files were decrypted and translated. It was during this coverage that terrorists kidnapped and killed Journal reporter Daniel Pearl.

=== 2007: Stock option scandal ===
In 2007, the paper won the Pulitzer Prize for Public Service, for exposing companies that illegally backdate stock options they awarded executives to increase their value.

=== 2015–present: Theranos investigation ===
In 2015, a report written by the Journal's John Carreyrou alleged that blood testing company Theranos' technology was faulty and founder Elizabeth Holmes was misleading investors. According to Vanity Fair, "a damning report published in The Wall Street Journal had alleged that the company was, in effect, a sham—that its vaunted core technology was actually faulty and that Theranos administered almost all of its blood tests using competitors' equipment." The Journal has subsequently published several more reports questioning Theranos' and Holmes' credibility. In May 2018, Carreyrou released a book about Theranos, Bad Blood.

Rupert Murdoch—at the time a major investor in Theranos and owner of the Journal—lost approximately $100 million in his investments in Theranos.

=== 2018–present: Investigation into Stormy Daniels payment ===
On January 12, 2018, Michael Rothfeld and Joe Palazzolo reported in The Wall Street Journal that during the 2016 presidential campaign, then-candidate Donald Trump's personal lawyer, Michael Cohen coordinated a $130,000 payment to Stormy Daniels for her silence regarding an alleged affair. In subsequent reports, the method of payment and many other details were extensively covered. In April of that year, FBI agents stormed Cohen's home, seizing records related to the transaction. On August 21, 2018, Cohen pleaded guilty to eight counts including campaign finance violations in connection with the Daniels payment. The coverage earned the Journal the 2019 Pulitzer Prize for National Reporting.

=== 2021: Facebook company files leak ===
In 2021, an internal document leak from Facebook (now Meta Platforms, or Meta) showed it was aware of harmful societal effects from its platforms, yet persisted in prioritizing profit over addressing these harms. The leak, released by whistleblower Frances Haugen, resulted in reporting from The Wall Street Journal in September, as The Facebook Files series by journalist Jeff Horwitz, as well as the Facebook Papers, by a consortium of news outlets over the following months.

Primarily, the reports revealed that, based on internally commissioned studies, the company was fully aware of negative impacts on teenage users of Instagram, and the contribution of Facebook activity to violence in developing countries. Other takeaways of the leak include the impact of the company's platforms on spreading false information, and Facebook's policy of promoting inflammatory posts. Furthermore, Facebook was fully aware that harmful content was being pushed through Facebook algorithms reaching young users. The types of content included posts promoting anorexia nervosa and self-harm photos.

In October 2021, Whistleblower Aid filed eight anonymous whistleblower complaints with the U.S. Securities and Exchange Commission (SEC) on behalf of Haugen alleging securities fraud by the company, after Haugen leaked the company documents the previous month. After publicly revealing her identity on 60 Minutes, Haugen testified before the U.S. Senate Commerce Subcommittee on Consumer Protection, Product Safety, and Data Security about the content of the leaked documents and the complaints. After the company renamed itself as Meta Platforms, Whistleblower Aid filed two additional securities fraud complaints with the SEC against the company on behalf of Haugen in February 2022.

In response to the media fallout, Facebook executives went on press tours to express Facebook's position amidst the frenzy. Facebook also did internal damage control with employees through in-person sessions and memos. The leak was dramatized in the film The Social Reckoning (2026).

=== 2025: Jeffrey Epstein's relationship with Donald Trump ===
On July 17, 2025, the newspaper reported that, in 2003, Donald Trump had sent convicted child sex offender Jeffrey Epstein a 50th birthday card. On July 18, then-President Trump sued the newspaper, alleging two counts of defamation and seeking at least $10 billion for each count. It was believed to be the first time a sitting president had ever sued a journalist or media outlet for personal defamation. On July 21, the Journal was also removed from the White House press pool for Trump's trip to Scotland. Trump's defamation case was later dismissed on April 13, 2026.

== See also ==
- William Peter Hamilton
- Far Eastern Economic Review – Asian business magazine (1946–2009)
- Index of Economic Freedom – an annual report published by the Journal together with The Heritage Foundation
- List of financial market information services
- Lucky duckies
- Media in New York City
- On the Money (2013 TV series) – the current title of a CNBC-produced program known as The Wall Street Journal Report from 1970 until the CNBC/Dow Jones split in January 2013.
- The Wall Street Journal Special Editions
- Wall Street Journal Radio Network
- Worth Bingham Prize
- Billion dollar whale
