= Hong Kong Journalists Association =

Hong Kong journalists' trade union

- 香港記者協會
- Founded: 1968; 58 years ago
- Type: Non-government organisation
- Headquarters: Wan Chai, Hong Kong
- Coordinates: 22.2790°N 114.1789°E
- Chairperson: Selina Cheng
- Website: www.hkja.org.hk

Hong Kong Journalists Association
- Traditional Chinese: 香港記者協會
- Simplified Chinese: 香港记者协会
Transcriptions
Standard Mandarin
- Hanyu Pinyin: Xiānggǎng Jìzhě Xiéhuì
Yue: Cantonese
- Jyutping: hoeng1 gong2 gei3 ze2 hip3 wui6*2

The Hong Kong Journalists Association is a Hong Kong association that represents journalists in Hong Kong. Established in 1968, the association acts as a trade union for journalists by seeking to improve working conditions for them and further works to aid journalists by striving to remove barriers journalists face when gathering news. HKJA also serves as a channel for individuals to file complaints when unethical reporting in local media is observed.

The association has been chaired by Selina Cheng since June 2024.

== Background ==
Every year, HKJA produces a report on the press freedom status in Hong Kong. It is widely circulated to foreign consulates and non-governmental organisations and is often quoted in foreign media reports about Hong Kong. The 2006 report describes the challenges facing the media in Hong Kong, including the government's attempts to influence the editorial direction of the public broadcaster Radio Television Hong Kong.

Prior to 2006, the report was annually produced in partnership with ARTICLE 19, a London-based rights group.

HKJA is an affiliated member of the International Federation of Journalists, the world's largest journalists' organisation.

HKJA is also a member of the International Freedom of Expression Exchange, a global network of non-governmental organisations that monitors censorship worldwide and defends journalists, writers, Internet users and others who are persecuted for exercising their right to freedom of expression.

In August 2026, HKJA's legitimacy as a union was attacked by Chris Tang and pro-Beijing media outlets Wen Wei Po, Bastille Post, Orange News, and Dot Dot News.

=== Funding ===
To maintain its neutrality, HKJA is funded by membership fees and other fund-raising activities, such as annual dinners, seminars (for non-members), training courses etc.

=== Membership classifications ===
One may choose to join HKJA as a Full Member, Associate Member, Public Relations Member or Student Member.

== List of chairman ==
The association has been chaired by Selina Cheng since June 2024.

- Selina Cheng, 2024–
- Ronson Chan, 2021–24
- Chris Yeung (楊健興), 2017–21
- Sham Yee-lan (岑倚蘭), 2013–17
- Mak Yin-ting (麥燕庭), 2009–13
- Tam Chi-keung (譚志強), 2008–09
- Fan Ho-tsai (范皓齊), 2007–08
- Lo King-wah, –2007

== Activities ==
The Association organises various activities to inform their members of the latest news/developments in the field. These include seminars, workshops, press awards and overseas tours. The Association also organises football matches, i.e. JA Cup, since 1985.

=== JA Cup ===
The HKJA Cup was inaugurated in 1984. The champions of the JA Cup are:

Anniversary	Year	Champion
1st	1985	Wah Kiu Yat Pao
2nd	1986	Wah Kiu Yat Pao
3rd	1987	Wah Kiu Yat Pao
4th	1988	Hong Kong Commercial Daily
5th	1989	Oriental Daily News
6th	1990	Sing Pao
7th	1991	Sing Tao
8th	1992	Sing Tao
9th	1993	Sing Tao
10th	1994	Sing Pao
11th	1995	no information
12th	1996	Oriental Daily News
13th	1997	Oriental Daily News
14th	1998	Oriental Daily News
15th	1999	Oriental Daily News
16th	2001	Cable TV
17th	2002	Oriental Daily News
18th	2003	Oriental Daily News
19th	2004	Oriental Daily News
20th	2005	Oriental Daily News
21st	2006	Oriental Daily News
22nd	2007	Oriental Daily News
23rd	2008	Oriental Daily News
24th	2009	Cable TV
25th	2010	Chai Wa Wa
26th	2011	Cable TV
27th	2012	Daily News United
28th	2013	Hartiend FC

== Press freedom issues in Hong Kong ==
=== Radio Television Hong Kong (RTHK) ===
Questions over Hong Kong's press freedom were raised when the government announced plans to set up a committee to review public broadcasting in January 2005. The greatest concern that arose from the establishment of the committee seemed to be the controversy over the editorial independence/freedom of Radio Television Hong Kong (RTHK). The broadcaster is known for airing views and opinions that challenge the government's policies. Consequently, there were fears over whether RTHK's editorial independence would remain. The Hong Kong Journalists Association responded to the issue by saying that RTHK should maintain its freedom and remain independent of the government (for more on HKJA's response, see the HKJA Annual Report (2006)).

=== Article 23 ===
Introduced as a law to protect national security, Article 23 of the Basic Law created much concern and debate over Hong Kong's right to freedom of speech. On the one hand, the government wanted to pass the bill to help the country and protect it from any threats, while on the other, individuals wanted to be able to express themselves freely. In a response to the issue, HKJA opposed the bill as it felt that Article 23 posed a threat to freedom of expression and was also unnecessary. Due to the dissatisfaction of the people, on 1 July 2003 approximately 500,000 people protested against Article 23. On 5 September later that year, the government announced that it had decided to withdraw the bill.

== Hong Kong press ratings ==
On 26 October 2006, Ming Pao reported the findings of a survey in which Hong Kong people were asked to rate the local press. It showed that the press received a relatively steady approval rating from the general public.

However, another survey conducted by the University of Hong Kong, showed that public support for the press in Hong Kong has been decreasing and has reached its lowest point in three years.

According to the World Press Freedom Index compiled and published by Reporters Without Borders, Hong Kong’s ranking plunged from 18th place to 140th over some 20 years.

== See also ==
- International Federation of Journalists
- International Freedom of Expression Exchange
- Media in Hong Kong
