= Lost Hills (disambiguation) =

The Lost Hills are a mountain range in Kern County, California, U.S.

Lost Hills may also refer to:

- Lost Hills, California, a census-designated place
  - Lost Hills Airport (defunct)
  - Lost Hills Oil Field
- Lost Hills, a 2015 album by State Shirt
- Lost Hills Books, a publishing house founded by Bruce Henricksen
