= Sproll =

Sproll may refer to:

- Sproll (band), Canadian indie rock band
- Joannes Baptista Sproll, German bishop
- Theodor Sproll, German social scientist

== See also ==
- Sprawl (disambiguation)
- Sproul (disambiguation)
