= Paul Sproule =

Australian rules footballer and coach (1944–2025)

Personal information
- Born: 16 December 1944
- Died: 26 August 2025 (aged 80)
- Original team: Hobart (TANFL)
- Height: 180 cm (5 ft 11 in)
- Weight: 77.5 kg (171 lb)

Playing career
Years	Club	Games (Goals)
1968–1971	Essendon	60 (60)
1972–1975	Richmond	86 (93)
Total		146 (153)

Representative team honours
Years	Team	Games (Goals)
1976–1977	Tasmania	3

Coaching career
Years	Club	Games (W–L–D)
1976–78, 1983–84	Sandy Bay	102 (72–29–1)
1980–1981	Hobart	38 (20–18–0)
1985	Richmond	22 (9–13–0)
Total		162 (101–60–1)

Career highlights
- 2× VFL Premiership player: (1973, 1974); Richmond Life Member 2013; Hobart Football Club Life Member 2016; Tasmanian Football Hall of Fame Icon; Tasmanian Sporting Hall of Fame member

Paul Sproule (16 December 1944 – 26 August 2025) was an Australian rules footballer who played for the Essendon Football Club and Richmond Football Club in the Victorian Football League (VFL), as well as for the Hobart Football Club and Sandy Bay Football Club in the Tasmanian Australian National Football League (TANFL). He also served brief stints as senior coach of Richmond, Hobart and Sandy Bay.

A skilled midfielder who could also kick the goals, Sproule is a member of what could be described as Tasmania's Golden Generation – a period where AFL Hall of Fame Legends Darrel Baldock, Peter Hudson, Ian Stewart and Royce Hart cemented their reputations in Victoria, QLD. He was a member of the Richmond team that dominated the VFL during the early 1970s and went back-to-back in 1973 and 1974; he was consistently among the team's best players in finals matches. He won premierships in the TANFL, captain-coaching Sandy Bay to a hat-trick from 1976 to 1978 and then coaching Hobart to the flag in 1980 after the club had finished wooden spooners the previous season.

Kevin Sheedy, who played with Sproule at Richmond, spoke highly of his quality and value within the team:

Paul was an excellent player. He had an extremely intelligent football brain. He read the play extremely well and had that ability to get where the ball was all the time. He might have been under-rated outside of Richmond, but I can assure you that among his teammates he was very, very highly regarded.

Sproule died on 26 August 2025, at the age of 80.

== Career ==
Sproule began his senior football career with TANFL club Hobart Tigers in 1962 alongside Ian Stewart. The pair would be reunited ten years later at Richmond, by which time Stewart had become a VFL superstar, having won the Brownlow Medal three times.

After winning two premierships with Hobart in 1963 and 1966, Sproule moved to Victoria to play for Essendon, but missed the entire 1967 VFL season after badly breaking his leg. Sproule's highlight at Essendon was he was second rover in the losing team for the 1968 VFL Grand Final. To the surprise of many Essendon cleared Sproule to Richmond in 1972.

Sproule made his Richmond debut in Round 4 against keen rivals Carlton at Princes Park. In a highly physical and entertaining game, the Tigers pulled away in the third quarter before holding out for a thrilling five-point win. Sproule was not named among Richmond's best, but still made a significant contribution with 19 disposals and three goals. He went on to play 21 games for the season. He was considered Richmond's best player in the shock 1972 VFL Grand Final loss to Carlton.

In the team line-up for the 1974 VFL Grand Final against North Melbourne, Sproule was named on the half-forward flank but was moved to the centre ten minutes in to the second quarter after the Kangaroos had worked their way to an 11-point lead. The Tigers would kick six unanswered goals in the next 15 minutes, going on to win by 41 points and becoming the first team since Melbourne in 1959 and 1960 to defend the VFL premiership. Sproule was considered among Richmond's best, along with Kevin Sheedy (who was regarded as best on ground) and Royce Hart.

== Recognition ==
Sproule was one of the inaugural inductees when the Tasmanian Football Hall of Fame was launched in 2005. In 2016, he was elevated to Icon status, joining former Richmond teammates Royce Hart and Ian Stewart. He also became a member of the Tasmanian Sporting Hall of Fame that year, and was awarded Life Membership at Richmond in 2013.

Sproule was awarded Life Membership of the Hobart Football Club in 2016.
