= Sproule =

Sproule is a surname. Notable people with the surname include:

- Cathy Sproule, Canadian politician
- Claire Sproule (born 1984), Irish singer-songwriter
- Clifford Sproule (1905–1981), Australian tennis player and administrator
- Daniel Sproule (born 1974), Australian field hockey player
- Dáithí Sproule (born 1950), Northern Irish guitarist and singer
- Devon Sproule (born 1982), Canadian-American singer-songwriter
- Dorothy Sproule (1867-1963), Canadian poet
- Harvey Sproule (1883–1959), Canadian hockey player
- Ivan Sproule (born 1981), Northern Irish footballer
- John Thomas Sproule (1876–1940), Canadian politician
- Paul Sproule (born 1944), Australian rules footballer
- Peter Sproule (born 1947), English actor
- Robert Auchmuty Sproule (died 1845), Canadian artist
- Robert Sproule (1881–1948), Irish-born Australian public servant and politician
- Thomas Simpson Sproule (1843–1917), Canadian parliamentarian
- Wallace Sproule (1891–1947), Irish cricketer
- William Sproule (1858–1935), American businessman
- Zach Sproule (born 1998), Australian rules footballer

== See also ==
- Claire Sproule (album)
- Sproul (disambiguation)
