= Robert Sproul =

Robert Sproul may refer to:

- R. C. Sproul (1939–2017), American Calvinist theologian
- R. C. Sproul Jr. (born 1965), Calvinist Christian minister and son of R. C. Sproul
- Robert Gordon Sproul (1891–1975), president of the University of California
  - RV Robert Gordon Sproul, a research vessel operated by the Scripps Institution of Oceanography
- Robert C. Sproul, founder of Major Publications

== See also ==
- Robert Sproull (1918–2014), American physicist and president of the University of Rochester
- Bob Sproull (born c. 1945), American computer scientist
- Robert Sproule (1881–1948), Australian politician
- Robert Auchmuty Sproule, Canadian artist
- Sproul (disambiguation)
