= New Orleans Review =

- Language: English

Publication details
- Publisher: The Department of English at Loyola University (United States)
- Frequency: Biannually

Standard abbreviations
- ISO 4: New Orleans Rev.

Indexing
- ISSN: 0028-6400
- OCLC no.: 435982137

New Orleans Review, founded in 1968, is a journal of contemporary literature and culture that publishes "poetry, fiction, nonfiction, art, photography, film and book reviews" by established and emerging writers and artists. New Orleans Review is a publication of the Department of English at Loyola University New Orleans. Lindsay Sproul is the current editor-in-chief.

New Orleans Review is published biannually and is distributed nationally and internationally by Ingram Periodicals. Work published in New Orleans Review has been reprinted in anthologies such as the Pushcart Prize Anthology, Best American Nonrequired Reading, New Stories From the South, Utne Reader, Poetry Daily, Verse Daily, and O. Henry Prize Stories. In 1978 the journal published an excerpt from Confederacy of Dunces by John Kennedy Toole with a foreword by Walker Percy, who was a contributing editor to the magazine. The novel was subsequently published in 1980 by LSU Press and was awarded the Pulitzer Prize in 1981. New Orleans Review published a critically acclaimed special issue on New Orleans by New Orleans writers and photographers in 2006 in the wake of Hurricane Katrina, which Tony D'Souza wrote in Salon is "a post-Katrina issue that avoids easy responses to the disaster, withholds simple prognoses for the future, and inhabits its moment of most-relevance so surely that its collective voice rises high above the din."

== History ==
New Orleans Review was founded in 1968 by John William Corrington and Miller Williams at Loyola University.

Editors:

- Miller Williams (1968–1970)
- Joseph A. Tetlow (1970–1972)
- Forrest L. Ingram (1972–1973)
- John F. Christman (1974)
- Marcus Smith (1974–1978)
- Dawson Gaillard (1978–1979)
- Bruce Henricksen (1980–1986)
- John Biguenet (1980–1992)
- John Mosier (1980–1992)
- Ralph Adamo (1994–1999)
- Sophia Stone (1999–2000)
- Christopher Chambers (2000–2012)
- Mark Yakich (2012-2019)
- Lindsay Sproul (2019–present)

== Notable contributors ==
- Walker Percy
- Pablo Neruda
- Ellen Gilchrist
- Nelson Algren
- Hunter S. Thompson
- John Kennedy Toole
- Richard Brautigan
- Barry Spacks
- Jimmy Carter
- James Sallis
- Jack Gilbert
- Paul Hoover
- Rodney Jones
- Annie Dillard
- Dede Wilson
- Everette Maddox
- Julio Cortazar
- Gordon Lish
- Robert Walser
- Mark Halliday
- Jack Butler
- Michael Harper
- Joyce Carol Oates
- Diane Wakoski
- Dermot Bolger
- Roddy Doyle
- William Kotzwinkle
- Alain Robbe-Grillet
- Arnost Lustig
- Raymond Queneau
- Yusef Komunyakaa
- Michael Martone
- Tess Gallagher
- Matthea Harvey
- D. A. Powell
- Rikki Ducornet
- Ed Skoog

== Bibliography ==
- Flora, Joseph M., Lucinda Hardwick. MacKethan, and Todd W. Taylor. "Louisiana, Literature Of." The Companion to Southern Literature: Themes, Genres, Places, People, Movements, and Motifs. Baton Rouge: Louisiana State UP, 2002. 461. Print.
