= Bruce Henricksen =

American poet

Bruce Henricksen (born 1941) was an American author, scholar, and editor, grew up in the town of Wanamingo, Minnesota and the city of Minneapolis.

== Life ==
Bruce Conley Henricksen was born in Faribault, Minnesota on February 26, 1941, the only child of Janet Engstrom Henricksen of Wanamingo, Minnesota. He graduated from the University of Minnesota in 1963 with a degree in English, having studied under poets Allen Tate and James Wright. In 1970, he received a Ph.D. from the University of Southern California and began a career at Loyola University New Orleans, where he chaired the English Department and was editor of the New Orleans Review from 1980 - 1986. While at Loyola, he received an NEH summer fellowship to Princeton University and was a participant in the Institute of Medieval and Renaissance Studies at Duke University and in The School of Criticism and Theory at Northwestern University.

As one of three editors of New Orleans Review (including poet John Biguenet and fellow English professor John Mosier), Henricksen helped turn the regional magazine into a major organ of critical discussion, bringing such theorists as Frederic Jameson, Jean-Francois Lyotard and others to the pages of the journal. His academic books include Murray Krieger and Contemporary Critical Theory, Reorientations: Critical Theories and Pedagogies, edited with Thais Morgan, and a widely referenced study of novelist Joseph Conrad entitled Nomadic Voices: Conrad and the Subject of Narrative.

Bruce Henricksen was married to Annick Ferré of Paris, France from 1962 to 1964. They had one child, Frederic Laurent Henricksen, in 1964.

Bruce Henricksen was married to Carolyn Van Deman from 1967 to 1988. They had two children, Jessica Suzanne Henricksen, born in 1969, and Teag Joseph Henricksen, born in 1976.

After surgery for throat cancer in 1996, Henricksen married Victoria Day and returned to Minnesota to live in Duluth. There, what had previously been a secondary endeavor, writing fiction, became the primary one. His short stories appeared in numerous magazines, and in 2005 his story collection, Ticket to a Lonely Town, was the only named finalist in the national competition for the Grace Paley Prize, and was subsequently published by Atomic Quill Press. Stories in this book are connected by recurrent characters and places, as the collection dramatizes various causes and forms of loneliness. In 2008 his novel, After the Floods (Lost Hills Books) appeared. Praised by the New Orleans Times-Picayune as a "thoroughly enjoyable flight of fancy" and "a spiritual comedy," the novel, set partially in post-Katrina New Orleans, combines magical realism and deconstruction in a manner at once imaginative and accessible. Also in 2008, Henricksen co-edited a volume in honor of a former mentor, From the Other World: Poems in Memory of James Wright (Lost Hills Books), to which many of our best-known poets contributed.

He founded Lost Hills Books, a small, literary publishing house, in 2007.

In 2008, Bruce Henricksen spoke on James Wright in libraries in the Twin Cities and throughout Minnesota. He and other contributors to From the Other World also participated in a memorial event for James Wright at the University of Minnesota in Minneapolis, where he and Wright first met.

In 2012, Henricksen published his collection of short stories, Crooked Miles, Woven World, which was named a finalist for the National Indie Excellence Book Award in 2013.

Bruce Henricksen died on October 21, 2021, as a result of Alzheimer's disease and associated complications. He is survived by his wife, Victoria Henricksen, two of his children, Frederic Henricksen of Paris, France and Jessica Henricksen of New Orleans, Louisiana, his two step-daughters Elizabeth Day and Sally Kralovec, and his six grandchildren, Paul and Thomas Henricksen, Freyja and Eostre Dommer, and Rebecca and Helen Kralovec.

== Selected works ==
- Murray Krieger and Contemporary Literary Theory (editor, Columbia University Press, 1986)
- Reorientations: Critical Theories and Pedagogies (co-editor with Thais Morgan, University of Illinois Press, 1990)
- Nomadic Voices: Conrad and the Subject of Narrative (University of Illinois Press, 1992)
- Ticket to a Lonely Town (Atomic Quill Press, 2005)
- The Lost Poetry of Golf (Pro Print, Duluth, 2005)
- The Zero Club Papers (Digital. 2006)
- Children of the Storm (Digital. 2007)
- After the Floods (Lost Hills Books, 2008)
- From the Other World: Poems in Memory of James Wright (editor with Robert Johnson. Lost Hills Books, 2008)
- Crooked Miles, Woven World (Lost Hills Books, 2012)
