= 1963 TANFL season =

Australian rules football season

- Teams: Clarence Kangaroos; Glenorchy Magpies; Hobart Tigers; New Norfolk Eagles; North Hobart Robins; Sandy Bay Seagulls
- Premiers: Hobart
- Minor premiers: Sandy Bay; 2nd minor premiership

Attendance
- Matches played: 61
- Total attendance: 236,221 (3,872 per match)

The 1963 Tasmanian Australian National Football League (TANFL) premiership season was an Australian Rules football competition staged in Hobart, Tasmania over 19 roster rounds and 4 finals series matches between 6 April and 14 September 1963. The champion was Hobart Football Club coached by Mal Pascoe who also played for the team.

== Participating Clubs ==
- Clarence District Football Club
- Glenorchy District Football Club
- Hobart Football Club
- New Norfolk District Football Club
- North Hobart Football Club
- Sandy Bay Football Club

=== 1963 TANFL Club Coaches ===
- Stuart Spencer (Clarence)
- John Chick (Glenorchy)
- Mal Pascoe (Hobart)
- Trevor Leo (New Norfolk)
- Darrell Eaton (North Hobart)
- Rex Geard (Sandy Bay)

=== TANFL Reserves Grand Final ===
- Glenorchy 15.14 (104) v New Norfolk 11.8 (74) – North Hobart Oval

=== TANFL Under-19's Grand Final ===
State Schools Old Boys Football Association (SSOBFA)

- Clarence 10.11 (71) v Glenorchy 6.8 (44) – New Town Oval

=== State Preliminary Final ===
(Saturday, 28 September 1963)

- Burnie Tigers: 7.2 (44) | 9.3 (57) | 15.7 (97) | 16.10 (106)
- Hobart: 1.2 (8) | 6.9 (45) | 7.12 (54) | 11.17 (83)
- Attendance: 6,500 at West Park Oval

Note: Burnie (NWFU guernsey) and Hobart (TANFL guernsey) wore alternate strips due to a guernsey clash.

=== State Grand Final ===
(Saturday, 5 October 1963)

- Burnie Tigers: 2.7 (19) | 6.14 (50) | 8.16 (64) | 8.25 (73)
- Nth Launceston: 1.3 (9) | 1.4 (10) | 2.10 (22) | 6.13 (49)
- Attendance: 6,490 at York Park

=== Intrastate Matches ===
Jubilee Shield (Saturday, 4 May 1963)

- TANFL 25.16 (166) v NTFA 13.14 (92) – Att: 10,590 at North Hobart Oval

Jubilee Shield (Saturday, 29 June 1963)

- NWFU 19.9 (123) v TANFL 11.15 (81) – Att: 7,300 at Devonport Oval

Inter-Association Match (Saturday, 4 May 1963)

- TANFL 17.24 (126) v Queenstown FA 7.7 (49) – Att: 10,590 at North Hobart Oval (Curtain-Raiser)

=== Interstate Matches ===
Interstate Match (Saturday, 1 June 1963)

- South Australia 18.29 (137) v Tasmania 5.1 (31) – Att: 14,898 at Adelaide Oval, South Australia

Interstate Match (Saturday, 8 June 1963)

- Tasmania 9.10 (64) v Western Australia 6.13 (49) – Att: 20,000 at Subiaco Oval

=== Leading Goalkickers: TANFL ===
- Peter Hudson (New Norfolk) – 79
- Stuart Palfreyman (Sandy Bay) – 71
- John Mills (Clarence) – 61
- Burnie Payne (Hobart) – 52
- Mal Pascoe (Hobart) – 41

=== Medal Winners ===
- Geoff Whitton (Sandy Bay) – William Leitch Medal
- Dal Johnson (Glenorchy) – George Watt Medal (Reserves)
- Graham Glover (New Norfolk) – V.A Geard Medal (Under-19's)
- R. Reid (Clarence) – Weller Arnold Medal (Best player in Intrastate matches)

== 1963 TANFL Ladder ==
Pos	Team	Pld	W	L	D	PF	PA	PP	Pts
1	Sandy Bay	19	12	7	0	1494	1236	120.9	48
2	New Norfolk	19	12	7	0	1483	1276	116.2	48
3	Hobart	19	11	7	1	1606	1430	112.3	46
4	Clarence	19	10	9	0	1357	1374	98.8	40
5	North Hobart	19	8	10	1	1233	1336	92.3	34
6	Glenorchy	19	3	16	0	1105	1626	68.0	12

=== Round 1 ===
(Saturday, 6 April 1963)

- Clarence 14.13 (97) v Glenorchy 11.9 (75) – Att: 4,891 at North Hobart Oval
- Nth Hobart 8.13 (61) v Sandy Bay 8.7 (55) – Att: 3,651 at Queenborough Oval
- Hobart 17.14 (116) v New Norfolk 11.12 (78) – Att: 2,241 at Boyer Oval

=== Round 2 ===
(Saturday, 13 April & Monday, 15 April 1963)

- Sandy Bay 12.19 (91) v Hobart 12.10 (82) – Att: 3,970 at North Hobart Oval
- New Norfolk 16.16 (112) v Glenorchy 9.6 (60) – Att: 2,428 at KGV Park
- Clarence 9.11 (65) v Nth Hobart 7.11 (53) – Att: 6,358 at North Hobart Oval (Monday)

=== Round 3 ===
(Saturday, 20 April 1963)

- Nth Hobart 11.8 (74) v Hobart 11.8 (74) – Att: 3,984 at North Hobart Oval
- Glenorchy 13.7 (85) v Sandy Bay 12.11 (83) – Att: 2,792 at Queenborough Oval
- New Norfolk 9.15 (69) v Clarence 8.13 (61) – Att: 3,544 at Bellerive Oval

=== Round 4 ===
(Saturday, 27 April 1963)

- New Norfolk 11.9 (75) v Sandy Bay 9.12 (66) – Att: 3,845 at North Hobart Oval
- Hobart 16.14 (110) v Clarence 11.9 (75) – Att: 3,067 at TCA Ground
- Nth Hobart 6.12 (48) v Glenorchy 6.11 (47) – Att: 3,050 at KGV Park

=== Round 5 ===
(Saturday, 11 May 1963)

- Hobart 13.14 (92) v Glenorchy 10.9 (69) – Att: 4,243 at North Hobart Oval
- Sandy Bay 13.10 (88) v Clarence 12.15 (87) – Att: 3,265 at Bellerive Oval
- New Norfolk 11.6 (72) v Nth Hobart 5.8 (38) – Att: 3,319 at Boyer Oval

=== Round 6 ===
(Saturday, 18 May 1963)

- Nth Hobart 13.15 (93) v Sandy Bay 11.9 (75) – Att: 3,948 at North Hobart Oval
- New Norfolk 15.16 (106) v Hobart 13.8 (86) – Att: 3,456 at TCA Ground
- Clarence 17.12 (114) v Glenorchy 7.13 (55) – Att: 2,921 at KGV Park

=== Round 7 ===
(Saturday, 25 May 1963)

- New Norfolk 11.9 (75) v Glenorchy 8.15 (63) – Att: 3,546 at North Hobart Oval
- Sandy Bay 16.18 (114) v Hobart 11.11 (77) – Att: 3,106 at Queenborough Oval
- Clarence 10.15 (75) v Nth Hobart 9.11 (65) – Att: 3,146 at Bellerive Oval

=== Round 8 ===
(Saturday, 1 June 1963)

- Sandy Bay 13.12 (90) v Glenorchy 7.13 (55) – Att: 3,887 at North Hobart Oval
- Nth Hobart 12.10 (82) v Hobart 9.15 (69) – Att: 2,623 at TCA Ground
- Clarence 15.7 (97) v New Norfolk 13.11 (89) – Att: 3,324 at Boyer Oval

=== Round 9 ===
(Saturday, 8 June & Monday, 10 June 1963)

- Clarence 14.14 (98) v Hobart 10.19 (79) – Att: 4,953 at North Hobart Oval
- Sandy Bay 12.13 (85) v New Norfolk 10.10 (70) – Att: 3,015 at Boyer Oval
- Glenorchy 12.5 (77) v Nth Hobart 10.8 (68) – Att: 4,634 at North Hobart Oval (Monday)

=== Round 10 ===
(Saturday, 15 June 1963)

- Nth Hobart 13.7 (85) v New Norfolk 10.11 (71) – Att: 4,047 at North Hobart Oval
- Clarence 11.10 (76) v Sandy Bay 10.8 (68) – Att: 4,222 at Queenborough Oval
- Hobart 11.14 (80) v Glenorchy 8.9 (57) – Att: 2,669 at KGV Park

=== Round 11 ===
(Saturday, 22 June 1963)

- Hobart 11.11 (77) v New Norfolk 10.7 (67) – Att: 3,698 at North Hobart Oval
- Sandy Bay 9.16 (70) v Nth Hobart 5.7 (37) – Att: 3,968 at Queenborough Oval
- Clarence 12.15 (87) v Glenorchy 8.13 (61) – Att: 2,813 at Bellerive Oval

=== Round 12 ===
(Saturday, 29 June 1963)

- Clarence 8.14 (62) v Nth Hobart 8.12 (60) – Att: 4,092 at North Hobart Oval
- Sandy Bay 15.11 (101) v Hobart 13.10 (88) – Att: 2,665 at TCA Ground
- New Norfolk 10.16 (76) v Glenorchy 7.7 (49) – Att: 2,094 at Boyer Oval

=== Round 13 ===
(Saturday, 6 July 1963)

- Hobart 9.13 (67) v Nth Hobart 9.9 (63) – Att: 3,995 at North Hobart Oval
- Sandy Bay 13.13 (91) v Glenorchy 5.7 (37) – Att: 2,219 at KGV Park
- New Norfolk 13.11 (89) v Clarence 8.10 (58) – Att: 3,547 at Bellerive Oval

=== Round 14 ===
(Saturday, 13 July 1963)

- Hobart 10.19 (79) v Clarence 3.8 (26) – Att: 3,186 at North Hobart Oval
- Nth Hobart 7.6 (48) v Glenorchy 4.5 (29) – Att: 1,591 at KGV Park
- Sandy Bay 9.5 (59) v New Norfolk 6.9 (45) – Att: 2,512 at Queenborough Oval

=== Round 15 ===
(Saturday, 20 July 1963)

- Clarence 9.7 (61) v Sandy Bay 8.8 (56) – Att: 5,069 at North Hobart Oval
- Hobart 16.15 (111) v Glenorchy 8.9 (57) – Att: 1,580 at TCA Ground
- New Norfolk 9.12 (66) v Nth Hobart 8.12 (60) – Att: 2,720 at Boyer Oval

=== Round 16 ===
(Saturday, 27 July 1963)

- Hobart 15.13 (103) v New Norfolk 10.16 (76) – Att: 3,285 at TCA Ground
- Sandy Bay 15.8 (98) v Nth Hobart 3.10 (28) – Att: 4,349 at Queenborough Oval
- Glenorchy 8.9 (57) v Clarence 6.8 (44) – Att: 1,970 at KGV Park

=== Round 17 ===
(Saturday, 3 August 1963)

- Sandy Bay 9.11 (65) v Hobart 8.10 (58) – Att: 5,905 at North Hobart Oval
- Nth Hobart 12.11 (83) v Clarence 10.14 (74) – Att: 2,223 at Bellerive Oval
- New Norfolk 15.23 (113) v Glenorchy 3.3 (21) – Att: 2,060 at Boyer Oval

=== Round 18 ===
(Saturday, 10 August 1963)

- New Norfolk 10.11 (71) v Clarence 5.17 (47) – Att: 5,691 at North Hobart Oval
- Hobart 13.13 (91) v Nth Hobart 11.18 (84) – Att: 2,533 at TCA Ground
- Sandy Bay 14.10 (94) v Glenorchy 6.16 (52) – Att: 2,367 at Queenborough Oval

=== Round 19 ===
(Saturday, 17 August 1963)

- Nth Hobart 16.9 (105) v Glenorchy 14.15 (99) – Att: 2,330 at North Hobart Oval
- Hobart 9.13 (67) v Clarence 7.11 (53) – Att: 3,186 at Bellerive Oval
- New Norfolk 8.21 (69) v Sandy Bay 6.9 (45) – Att: 4,416 at Boyer Oval

=== First Semi Final ===
(Saturday, 24 August 1963)

- Hobart: 4.1 (25) | 6.5 (41) | 12.6 (78) | 13.9 (87)
- Clarence: 1.4 (10) | 5.9 (39) | 8.12 (60) | 10.20 (80)
- Attendance: 11,827 at North Hobart Oval

=== Second Semi Final ===
(Saturday, 31 August 1963)

- Sandy Bay: 2.1 (13) | 7.7 (49) | 11.8 (74) | 15.11 (101)
- New Norfolk: 4.2 (26) | 5.2 (32) | 7.9 (51) | 10.9 (69)
- Attendance: 13,325 at North Hobart Oval

=== Preliminary Final ===
(Saturday, 7 September 1963)

- Hobart: 1.9 (15) | 3.13 (31) | 5.16 (46) | 12.19 (91)
- New Norfolk: 1.2 (8) | 4.7 (31) | 9.11 (65) | 13.12 (90)
- Attendance: 12,434 at North Hobart Oval

=== Grand Final ===
(Saturday, 14 September 1963)

- Hobart: 3.1 (19) | 4.1 (25) | 7.3 (45) | 10.4 (64)
- Sandy Bay: 2.1 (13) | 2.7 (19) | 5.7 (37) | 6.13 (49)
- Attendance: 14,498 at North Hobart Oval
