= Sproul =

Sproul may refer to:

== People ==
- Allan Sproul (1896–1978), American banker
- Daniel Sproul, member of the band Rose Hill Drive
- Dennis Sproul (born 1956), American football player
- Edith E. Sproul (1907–1999), American pathologist
- Elliott W. Sproul (1856–1935), U.S. Representative from Illinois
- Jacob Sproul, member of the band Rose Hill Drive
- Lindsay Sproul, American writer, editor and educator
- Nathan Sproul, Republican strategist
- R. C. Sproul (1939–2017), American Christian theologian
- R. C. Sproul, Jr. (born 1965), American Christian theologian; son of R. C. Sproul
- Robert Gordon Sproul (1891–1975), eleventh President of the University of California
- Ryan Sproul (born 1993), Canadian-born ice hockey player
- Stanley Sproul (1920–2015), American politician and lawyer
- William Cameron Sproul (1870–1928), 27th Governor of Pennsylvania
- William H. Sproul (1867–1932), U.S. Representative from Kansas

== Places ==
- Sproul, West Virginia
- Sproul Observatory
- Sproul Plaza
- Sproul State Forest
- Sproul, Pennsylvania
- Sproul House

== See also ==
- Kevin Sprouls, American illustrator
- Sproule
