= 1966 TANFL season =

Football League

- Teams: Clarence Kangaroos; Glenorchy Magpies; Hobart Tigers; New Norfolk Eagles; North Hobart Robins; Sandy Bay Seagulls
- Premiers: Hobart
- Minor premiers: New Norfolk; 3rd minor premiership

Attendance
- Matches played: 58
- Total attendance: 242,458 (4,180 per match)

The 1966 Tasmanian Australian National Football League (TANFL) premiership season was an Australian Rules football competition staged in Hobart, Tasmania over eighteen (18) roster rounds and four (4) finals series matches between 2 April and 17 September 1966.

== Participating Clubs ==
- Clarence District Football Club
- Glenorchy District Football Club
- Hobart Football Club
- New Norfolk District Football Club
- North Hobart Football Club
- Sandy Bay Football Club

=== 1966 TANFL Club Coaches ===
- Stuart Spencer (Clarence)
- Bobby Parsons (Glenorchy)
- John Watts (Hobart)
- Trevor Leo (New Norfolk)
- Dick Grimmond (North Hobart)
- Rex Geard (Sandy Bay)

=== TANFL Reserves Grand Final ===
- Clarence 12.13 (85) v Glenorchy 7.8 (50) – North Hobart Oval

=== TANFL Under-19's Grand Final ===
(Saturday, 24 September 1966)

- New Norfolk 12.8 (80) v Nth Hobart 5.9 (39) – North Hobart Oval

=== State Preliminary Final ===
(Saturday, 24 September 1966)

- Hobart: 3.5 (23) | 6.6 (42) | 9.13 (67) | 11.19 (85)
- Burnie Tigers: 2.5 (17) | 7.8 (50) | 9.9 (63) | 10.11 (71)
- Attendance: 4,040 at West Park Oval

Note: Hobart (TANFL guernsey) and Burnie (NWFU guernsey) wore alternate strips owing to a guernsey clash.

=== State Grand Final ===
(Saturday, 1 October 1966)

- City-South: 1.5 (11) | 5.9 (39) | 8.10 (58) | 10.15 (75)
- Hobart: 2.3 (15) | 6.5 (41) | 8.10 (58) | 9.13 (67)
- Attendance: 8,652 at York Park

=== Intrastate Matches ===
Jubilee Shield (Saturday, 23 April 1966)

- NTFA 20.19 (139) v TANFL 13.10 (88) – Att: 6,877 at York Park

Jubilee Shield (Saturday, 21 May 1966)

- TANFL 25.13 (163) v NWFU 12.8 (80) – Att: 12,037 at North Hobart Oval

Inter-Association Match (Saturday, 21 May 1966)

- TANFL 17.17 (119) v Huon FA 16.20 (116) – Att: 12,037 at North Hobart Oval (Intrastate Curtain-Raiser)

=== Interstate Matches ===
See: 1966 Australian National Football Carnival

Match Two (Thursday, 9 June 1966)

- Victorian FL: 5.6 (36) | 12.13 (85) | 21.21 (147) | 26.24 (180)
- Tasmania: 4.1 (25) | 7.2 (44) | 10.4 (64) | 11.13 (79)
- Attendance: 20,047 at North Hobart Oval (Double header)

Match Four (Saturday, 11 June 1966)

- Tasmania: 4.6 (30) | 6.13 (49) | 13.22 (100) | 19.27 (141)
- Victorian FA: 3.1 (19) | 4.3 (27) | 5.5 (35) | 7.11 (53)
- Attendance: 23,764 at North Hobart Oval (Double header) *

Note: Ground record for North Hobart Oval at the time, subsequently broken in 1970 and again in 1979.

Match Seven (Thursday, 16 June 1966)

- Western Australia: 3.6 (24) | 8.8 (56) | 15.12 (102) | 17.13 (115)
- Tasmania: 5.2 (32) | 11.4 (70) | 13.8 (86) | 16.10 (106)
- Attendance: 10,199 at North Hobart Oval (Double header)

Match Nine (Saturday, 18 June 1966) (TV highlights: Tasmania v Sth Australia)

- South Australia: 3.0 (18) | 7.3 (45) | 11.5 (71) | 14.7 (91)
- Tasmania: 1.3 (9) | 2.7 (19) | 4.9 (33) | 9.13 (67)
- Attendance: 23,368 at North Hobart Oval (Double header)

=== Leading Goalkickers: TANFL ===
- Peter Hudson (New Norfolk) – 103
- John Mills (Clarence) – 81
- Brent Palfreyman (Sandy Bay) – 48
- Jeremy Thiessen (Hobart) – 40
- Darrell West (Glenorchy) – 40

=== Medal Winners ===
- Burnie Payne (Hobart) – William Leitch Medal
- W.Patmore (Nth Hobart) – George Watt Medal (Reserves)
- Tony Browning (New Norfolk) – V.A Geard Medal (Under-19's)
- Barry Browning (New Norfolk) – Weller Arnold Medal (Best player in Intrastate matches)

== 1966 TANFL Ladder ==
Pos	Team	Pld	W	L	D	PF	PA	PP	Pts
1	New Norfolk	18	15	3	0	1635	1190	137.4	60
2	Hobart	18	11	7	0	1578	1511	104.4	44
3	Glenorchy	18	10	8	0	1450	1264	114.7	40
4	Clarence	18	10	8	0	1395	1366	102.1	40
5	Sandy Bay	18	6	12	0	1308	1522	85.9	24
6	North Hobart	18	2	16	0	1245	1758	70.8	8

=== Round 1 ===
(Saturday, 2 April 1966)

- Clarence 10.14 (74) v New Norfolk 6.16 (52) – Att: 5,282 at North Hobart Oval
- Hobart 14.18 (102) v Nth Hobart 13.17 (95) – Att: 4,132 at TCA Ground
- Sandy Bay 10.7 (67) v Glenorchy 6.13 (49) – Att: 4,266 at KGV Park

=== Round 2 ===
(Saturday, 9 April & Monday, 11 April 1966)

- Hobart 14.14 (98) v Clarence 11.5 (71) – Att: 6,147 at North Hobart Oval
- New Norfolk 12.13 (85) v Sandy Bay 12.12 (84) – Att: 3,187 at Queenborough Oval
- Glenorchy 16.16 (112) v Nth Hobart 13.7 (85) – Att: 7,704 at North Hobart Oval (Monday)

=== Round 3 ===
(Saturday, 16 April 1966)

- Hobart 12.14 (86) v Glenorchy 12.13 (85) – Att: 6,263 at North Hobart Oval
- New Norfolk 19.7 (121) v Nth Hobart 9.9 (63) – Att: 2,928 at Boyer Oval
- Sandy Bay 11.9 (75) v Clarence 6.14 (50) – Att: 3,618 at Queenborough Oval

=== Round 4 ===
(Saturday, 23 April & Monday 25 April 1966)

- Sandy Bay 12.12 (84) v Nth Hobart 10.14 (74) – Att: 4,961 at North Hobart Oval
- New Norfolk 17.14 (116) v Hobart 12.17 (89) – Att: 2,915 at TCA Ground
- Clarence 16.9 (105) v Glenorchy 11.19 (85) – Att: 6,520 at KGV Park (Anzac Day) *

Note: All-time attendance record at KGV Park, later broken on 2 April 2011.

=== Round 5 ===
(Saturday, 30 April 1966)

- Hobart 19.22 (136) v Sandy Bay 15.14 (104) – Att: 5,594 at North Hobart Oval
- Glenorchy 12.7 (79) v New Norfolk 8.7 (55) – Att: 3,100 at Boyer Oval
- Clarence 13.14 (92) v Nth Hobart 8.23 (71) – Att: 2,978 at Bellerive Oval

=== Round 6 ===
(Saturday, 7 May 1966)

- Hobart 10.17 (77) v Nth Hobart 9.10 (64) – Att: 4,322 at North Hobart Oval
- Glenorchy 11.13 (79) v Sandy Bay 10.12 (72) – Att: 4,134 at Queenborough Oval
- New Norfolk 19.11 (125) v Clarence 6.12 (48) – Att: 3,302 at Boyer Oval

=== Round 7 ===
(Saturday, 14 May 1966)

- New Norfolk 17.12 (114) v Sandy Bay 7.17 (59) – Att: 6,052 at North Hobart Oval
- Clarence 17.17 (119) v Hobart 9.12 (66) – Att: 2,979 at Bellerive Oval
- Glenorchy 13.16 (94) v Nth Hobart 3.8 (26) – Att: 3,293 at KGV Park

=== Round 8 ===
(Saturday, 28 May 1966)

- New Norfolk 15.14 (104) v Nth Hobart 9.14 (68) – Att: 4,132 at North Hobart Oval
- Glenorchy 17.10 (112) v Hobart 13.15 (93) – Att: 4,161 at TCA Ground
- Sandy Bay 9.10 (64) v Clarence 8.14 (62) – Att: 3,635 at Bellerive Oval

=== Round 9 ===
(Saturday, 4 June 1966)

- Glenorchy 13.17 (95) v Clarence 9.11 (65) – Att: 5,989 at North Hobart Oval
- Sandy Bay 17.15 (117) v Nth Hobart 14.14 (98) – Att: 2,880 at Queenborough Oval
- New Norfolk 16.8 (104) v Hobart 5.16 (46) – Att: 3,279 at Boyer Oval

=== Round 10 ===
(Saturday, 9 June & Monday, 11 June 1966)

- Clarence 14.9 (93) v Nth Hobart 11.15 (81) – Att: 2,649 at North Hobart Oval
- Hobart 15.17 (107) v Sandy Bay 14.13 (97) – Att: 2,204 at TCA Ground
- New Norfolk 11.15 (81) v Glenorchy 10.14 (74) – Att: 4,125 at KGV Park (Monday)

=== Round 11 ===
(Saturday, 2 July 1966)

- Glenorchy 12.9 (81) v Sandy Bay 9.20 (74) – Att: 4,351 at North Hobart Oval
- New Norfolk 12.9 (81) v Clarence 11.12 (78) – Att: 3,247 at Bellerive Oval
- Hobart 15.17 (107) v Nth Hobart 9.18 (72) – Att: 1,896 at TCA Ground

=== Round 12 ===
(Saturday, 9 July 1966)

- Nth Hobart 14.7 (91) v Glenorchy 10.12 (72) – Att: 3,445 at North Hobart Oval
- Hobart 13.19 (97) v Clarence 9.7 (61) – Att: 2,998 at TCA Ground
- New Norfolk 15.13 (103) v Sandy Bay 12.17 (89) – Att: 3,282 at Queenborough Oval

=== Round 13 ===
(Saturday, 16 July 1966)

- Clarence 12.13 (85) v Sandy Bay 10.10 (70) – Att: 2,996 at North Hobart Oval
- New Norfolk 20.14 (134) v Nth Hobart 6.14 (50) – Att: 2,561 at Boyer Oval
- Glenorchy 13.14 (92) v Hobart 12.14 (86) – Att: 2,852 at KGV Park

=== Round 14 ===
(Saturday, 23 July 1966)

- Nth Hobart 5.11 (41) v Sandy Bay 4.10 (34) – Att: 2,140 at North Hobart Oval
- Hobart 12.4 (76) v New Norfolk 6.9 (45) – Att: 2,860 at TCA Ground
- Clarence 7.8 (50) v Glenorchy 5.12 (42) – Att: 2,489 at Bellerive Oval

=== Round 15 ===
(Saturday, 30 July 1966)

- New Norfolk 8.3 (51) v Glenorchy 4.8 (32) – Att: 5,431 at North Hobart Oval
- Sandy Bay 7.19 (61) v Hobart 9.5 (59) – Att: 2,512 at Queenborough Oval
- Clarence 15.14 (104) v Nth Hobart 9.7 (61) – Att: 2,456 at Bellerive Oval

=== Round 16 ===
(Saturday, 6 August 1966)

- Hobart 14.15 (99) v Nth Hobart 10.6 (66) – Att: 2,924 at North Hobart Oval
- Glenorchy 15.12 (102) v Sandy Bay 8.4 (52) – Att: 3,242 at Queenborough Oval
- New Norfolk 10.8 (68) v Clarence 6.7 (43) – Att: 3,145 at Boyer Oval

=== Round 17 ===
(Saturday, 13 August 1966)

- Clarence 12.14 (86) v Hobart 12.6 (78) – Att: 5,001 at North Hobart Oval
- Glenorchy 15.14 (104) v Nth Hobart 6.12 (48) – Att: 2,702 at KGV Park
- New Norfolk 12.16 (88) v Sandy Bay 7.6 (48) – Att: 2,302 at Boyer Oval

=== Round 18 ===
(Saturday, 20 August 1966)

- New Norfolk 16.12 (108) v Nth Hobart 13.12 (90) – Att: 2,700 at North Hobart Oval
- Hobart 10.16 (76) v Glenorchy 8.13 (61) – Att: 5,281 at KGV Park
- Clarence 16.13 (109) v Sandy Bay 8.9 (57) – Att: 2,379 at Bellerive Oval

=== First Semi Final ===
(Saturday, 27 August 1966)

- Glenorchy: 4.2 (26) | 9.6 (60) | 11.8 (74) | 13.10 (88)
- Clarence: 3.2 (20) | 4.5 (29) | 8.9 (57) | 9.12 (66)
- Attendance: 12,303 at North Hobart Oval

=== Second Semi Final ===
(Saturday, 3 September 1966)

- Hobart: 2.5 (17) | 4.8 (32) | 7.11 (53) | 11.14 (80)
- New Norfolk: 3.1 (19) | 6.4 (40) | 7.8 (50) | 10.9 (69)
- Attendance: 12,432 at North Hobart Oval

=== Preliminary Final ===
(Saturday, 10 September 1966)

- Glenorchy: 2.5 (17) | 4.8 (32) | 5.10 (40) | 10.11 (71)
- New Norfolk: 4.3 (27) | 4.6 (30) | 7.8 (50) | 8.12 (60)
- Attendance: 13,486 at North Hobart Oval

=== Grand Final ===
(Saturday, 17 September 1966)

- Hobart: 4.3 (27) | 6.9 (45) | 8.10 (58) | 10.14 (74)
- Glenorchy: 3.0 (18) | 5.1 (31) | 7.4 (46) | 11.7 (73)
- Attendance: 16,699 at North Hobart Oval

Source: All scores and statistics courtesy of the Hobart Mercury and Saturday Evening Mercury (SEM) publications.
