= Lost Hills, California =

- unincorporated community census-designated place
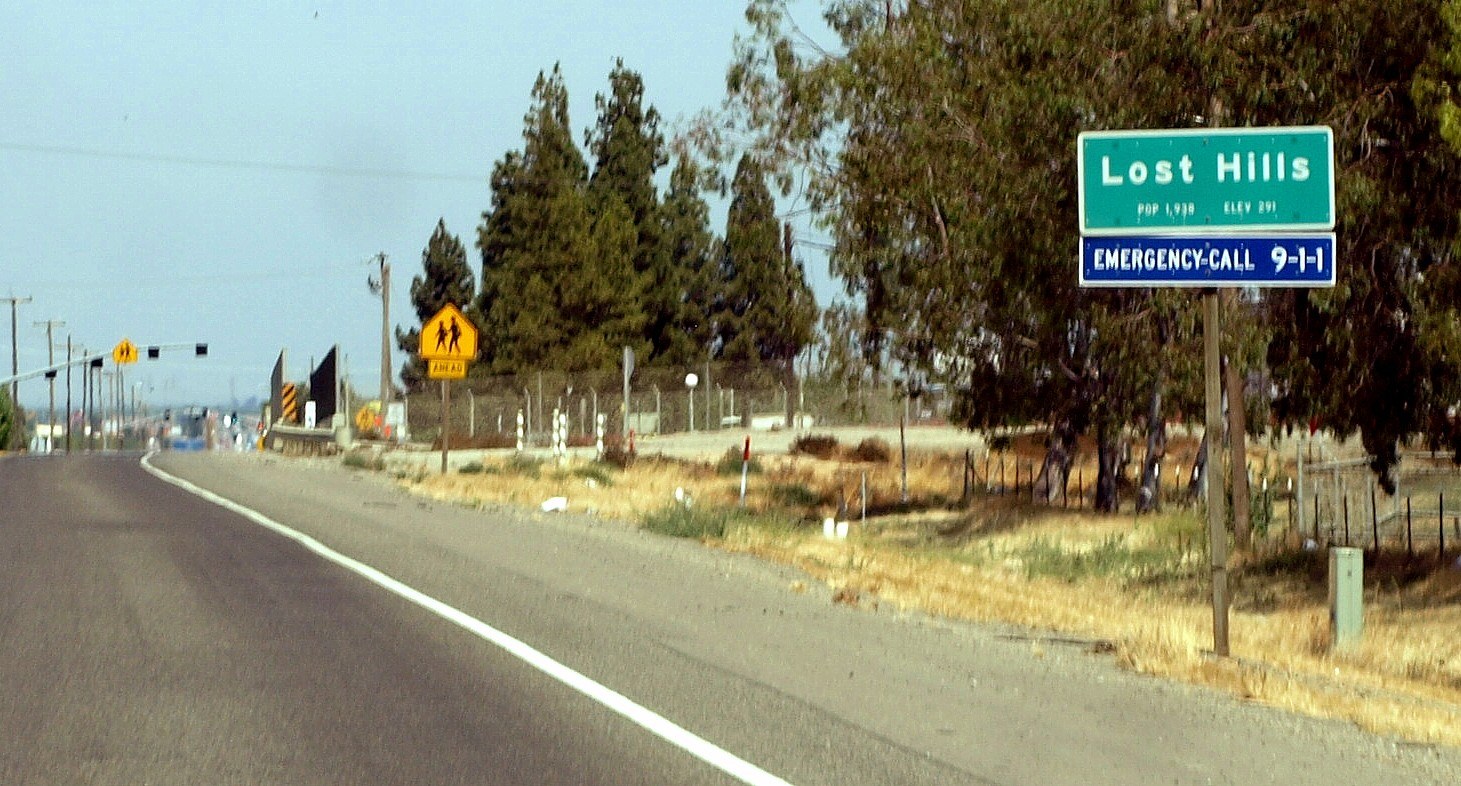
- Lost Hills' town sign at its western border, seen from SR 46

- Location in Kern County and the state of California

- Location in the United States
- Coordinates: 35°36′59″N 119°41′39″W
- Country: United States
- State: California
- County: Kern

Government
  - Senate: Melissa Hurtado (D)
  - Assembly: Jasmeet Bains (D)
  - U. S. Congress: David Valadao (R)

Area
  - Total: 5.563 sq mi (14.409 km^{2})
  - Land: 5.552 sq mi (14.379 km^{2})
  - Water: 0.012 sq mi (0.031 km^{2}) 0.21%
- Elevation: 305 ft (93 m)

Population (2020)
  - Total: 2,370
  - Density: 427/sq mi (165/km^{2})
- Time zone: UTC-08:00 (PST)
  - Summer (DST): UTC-07:00 (PDT)
- ZIP code: 93249
- Area code: 661
- FIPS code: 06-44280
- GNIS feature ID: 1660956

Lost Hills (formerly, Lost Hill) is an unincorporated community in Kern County, California, United States. Lost Hills is located 42 miles (68 km) west-northwest of Bakersfield, at an elevation of 305 feet (93 m). For statistical purposes, the United States Census Bureau has defined Lost Hills as a census-designated place (CDP). The population was 2,370 at the 2020 census, down from 2,412 at the 2010 census.

A rest stop by Interstate 5 including restaurants, gasoline stations, and motels is located about one-mile (1.6 km) east of the town. The Wonderful Company is a major employer of Lost Hills residents.

== Geography ==
Lost Hills stands on the east bank of the California Aqueduct. Interstate 5 is located near, but not adjacent, to Lost Hills. The town is at the intersection of State Route 46 and Lost Hills Road. The enormous Lost Hills Oil Field, which is sixth largest by remaining reserves in California, is west and northwest of town, extending about ten miles (16 km) along the range of the low Lost Hills Range, for which the town was named.

According to the United States Census Bureau, Lost Hills has a total area of 5.6 square miles (15 km^{2}), of which over 99% is land and 0.21% is water.

=== Climate ===
According to the Köppen Climate Classification system, Lost Hills has a semi-arid climate, abbreviated "BSk" on climate maps.

== History ==
The Lost Hills post office opened in 1911, closed in 1912, re-opened in 1913 (having transferred from Cuttens), and moved in 1937. At one time, the post office was a small rented room, in Edmondson's cafe and bar. Later it was a small mobile-home size building.

Paramount Farms built a new park and housing development in Lost Hills in the early 2000s.

After the death of a pedestrian trying to cross the highway, a green pedestrian bridge was constructed spanning California Highway 46. It was funded by the Wonderful Company. Its design resembles the shape of a lizard and is able to funnel any precipitation that lands on it to the sides to allow for collection.

== Demographics ==
Historical population
Census	Pop.	Note	%±
1990	1,212		—
2000	1,938		59.9%
2010	2,412		24.5%
2020	2,370		−1.7%
U.S. Decennial Census; 1990 2000 2010; 2020

Lost Hills first appeared as a census designated place in the 1990 U.S. census.

=== Racial and ethnic composition ===
Lost Hills CDP, California – Racial and ethnic composition Note: the US Census treats Hispanic/Latino as an ethnic category. This table excludes Latinos from the racial categories and assigns them to a separate category. Hispanics/Latinos may be of any race.
Race / Ethnicity (NH = Non-Hispanic)	Pop 2000	Pop 2010	Pop 2020	% 2000	% 2010	% 2020
White alone (NH)	50	38	30	2.58%	1.58%	1.27%
Black or African American alone (NH)	0	0	5	0.00%	0.00%	0.21%
Native American or Alaska Native alone (NH)	3	0	0	0.15%	0.00%	0.00%
Asian alone (NH)	1	17	4	0.05%	0.70%	0.17%
Native Hawaiian or Pacific Islander alone (NH)	0	1	0	0.00%	0.04%	0.00%
Other race alone (NH)	0	1	5	0.00%	0.04%	0.21%
Mixed race or Multiracial (NH)	9	1	3	0.46%	0.04%	0.13%
Hispanic or Latino (any race)	1,875	2,354	2,323	96.75%	97.60%	98.02%
Total	1,938	2,412	2,370	100.00%	100.00%	100.00%

=== 2020 census ===
As of the 2020 census, Lost Hills had a population of 2,370, with a population density of 426.9 inhabitants per square mile (164.8/km^{2}). The whole population lived in households.

The age distribution was 858 people (36.2%) under the age of 18, 268 people (11.3%) aged 18 to 24, 721 people (30.4%) aged 25 to 44, 410 people (17.3%) aged 45 to 64, and 113 people (4.8%) who were 65 years of age or older. The median age was 26.2 years. For every 100 females, there were 114.1 males, and for every 100 females age 18 and over, there were 116.9 males age 18 and over.

0.0% of residents lived in urban areas, while 100.0% lived in rural areas.

There were 582 households, out of which 353 (60.7%) had children under the age of 18 living in them, 316 (54.3%) were married-couple households, 65 (11.2%) were cohabiting couple households, 90 (15.5%) had a female householder with no partner present, and 111 (19.1%) had a male householder with no partner present. 79 households (13.6%) were one person, and 17 (2.9%) were one person aged 65 or older. The average household size was 4.07. There were 476 families (81.8% of all households).

There were 584 housing units at an average density of 105.2 units per square mile (40.6 units/km^{2}), of which 582 (99.7%) were occupied. Of these, 188 (32.3%) were owner-occupied, and 394 (67.7%) were occupied by renters. The homeowner vacancy rate was 0.0%; the rental vacancy rate was 0.5%.

=== Income and poverty ===
In 2023, the US Census Bureau estimated that the median household income was $42,333, and the per capita income was $13,361. About 21.8% of families and 26.9% of the population were below the poverty line.

=== 2010 census ===
At the 2010 census Lost Hills had a population of 2,412. The population density was 433.5 inhabitants per square mile (167.4/km^{2}). The racial makeup of Lost Hills was 132 (5.5%) White, 5 (0.2%) African American, 1 (0.0%) Native American, 17 (0.7%) Asian, 1 (0.0%) Pacific Islander, 2,232 (92.5%) from other races, and 24 (1.0%) from two or more races. Hispanic or Latino of any race were 2,354 persons (97.6%).

The whole population lived in households, no one lived in non-institutionalized group quarters and no one was institutionalized.

There were 448 households, 353 (78.8%) had children under the age of 18 living in them, 288 (64.3%) were opposite-sex married couples living together, 50 (11.2%) had a female householder with no husband present, 83 (18.5%) had a male householder with no wife present. There were 51 (11.4%) unmarried opposite-sex partnerships, and 2 (0.4%) same-sex married couples or partnerships. 9 households (2.0%) were one person and 3 (0.7%) had someone living alone who was 65 or older. The average household size was 5.38. There were 421 families (94.0% of households); the average family size was 5.02.

The age distribution was 970 people (40.2%) under the age of 18, 356 people (14.8%) aged 18 to 24, 730 people (30.3%) aged 25 to 44, 295 people (12.2%) aged 45 to 64, and 61 people (2.5%) who were 65 or older. The median age was 22.6 years. For every 100 females, there were 134.6 males. For every 100 females age 18 and over, there were 147.3 males.

There were 469 housing units at an average density of 84.3 per square mile, of the occupied units 178 (39.7%) were owner-occupied and 270 (60.3%) were rented. The homeowner vacancy rate was 2.7%; the rental vacancy rate was 1.8%. 976 people (40.5% of the population) lived in owner-occupied housing units and 1,436 people (59.5%) lived in rental housing units.
