= Sprawl =

Sprawl may refer to:

- Sprawl (grappling), a defensive technique in wrestling and martial arts used to prevent a takedown.
- Urban sprawl, also called suburban sprawl
- Server sprawl, when servers in a data center are underused
- Sprawl trilogy, a trilogy of novels by William Gibson
- The Sprawl, the nickname of Titan Station, the setting of the video game Dead Space 2
- Sprawling, in terrestrial locomotion, an animal body posture
