= Lost Hills Oil Field =

Kern County, California oilfield

Coordinates: 35°36′57.19″N 119°43′28.94″W

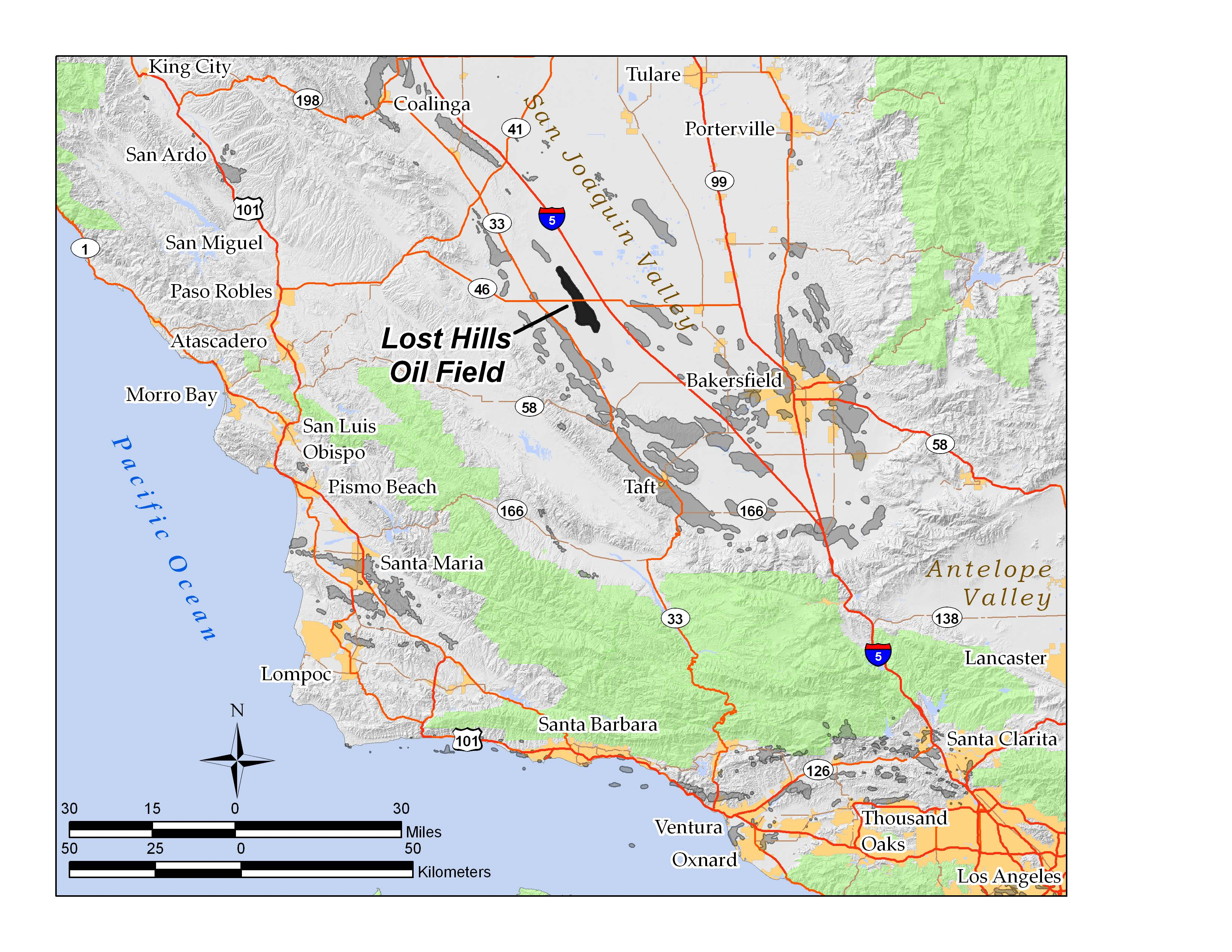
The Lost Hills Oil Field in the San Joaquin Valley of central California. Other oil fields are shown in gray.

The Lost Hills Oil Field is a large oil field in the Lost Hills Range, north of the town of Lost Hills in western Kern County, California, in the United States.

== Production ==
While only the 18th-largest oil field in California in size, in total remaining reserves it ranks sixth, with the equivalent of over 110 million barrels (17,000,000 m^{3}) producible reserves still in the ground, according to the California Division of Oil, Gas and Geothermal Resources (Chevron Corp., the principal operator, estimates considerably more oil in the ground). Production at Lost Hills has been increasing steadily: as of the end of 2006, it was California's second fastest-growing oil field, exceeded only by the nearby Cymric Field.

The Lost Hills field also contains considerable reserves of natural gas. In 1998, one of the field's gas wells was the site of a spectacular blowout, producing a pillar of fire which burned for 14 days and was visible more than 40 miles (64 km) away.

== Setting ==
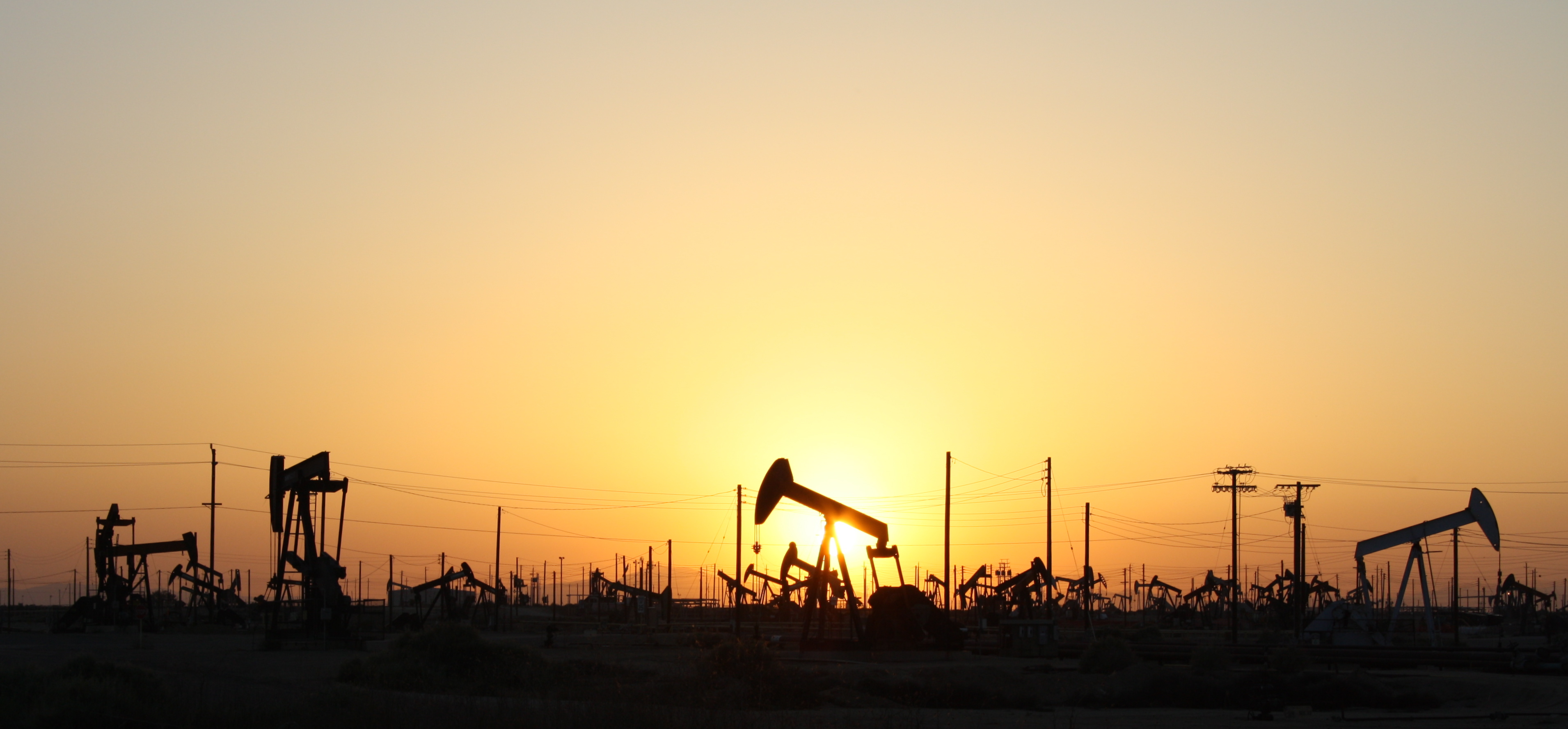
There are hundreds of pumpjacks on Lost Hills Oilfield near route 46.

The Lost Hills Field underlies a long, low range of southeast-to-northwest trending hills of the same name adjacent to the San Joaquin Valley. The hills rise scarcely more than 200 feet (61 m) above the San Joaquin Valley to the east, and only 100 feet (30 m) or less above the Antelope Plain to the west; in places they are almost flat. The hills and associated oil field are between Interstate 5 to the east and State Route 33 to the west, both of which parallel the field; Interstate 5 runs about 4 miles (6.4 km) away and Route 33 about 7 miles (11 km). The California Aqueduct runs adjacent to the field boundary on the northeast, and the town of Lost Hills is on the other side of the aqueduct along California State Route 46, which passes through the field from east to west.

The climate in the Lost Hills area is arid to semi-arid, with an average rainfall of 5 to 6 inches (130 to 150 mm) a year, almost all in the winter months. Vegetation in the vicinity of the field is mostly grassland and sparse scrub, with some adjacent orchards, although in the oil field itself most vegetation has been removed from the areas of active operations.

== Geology ==
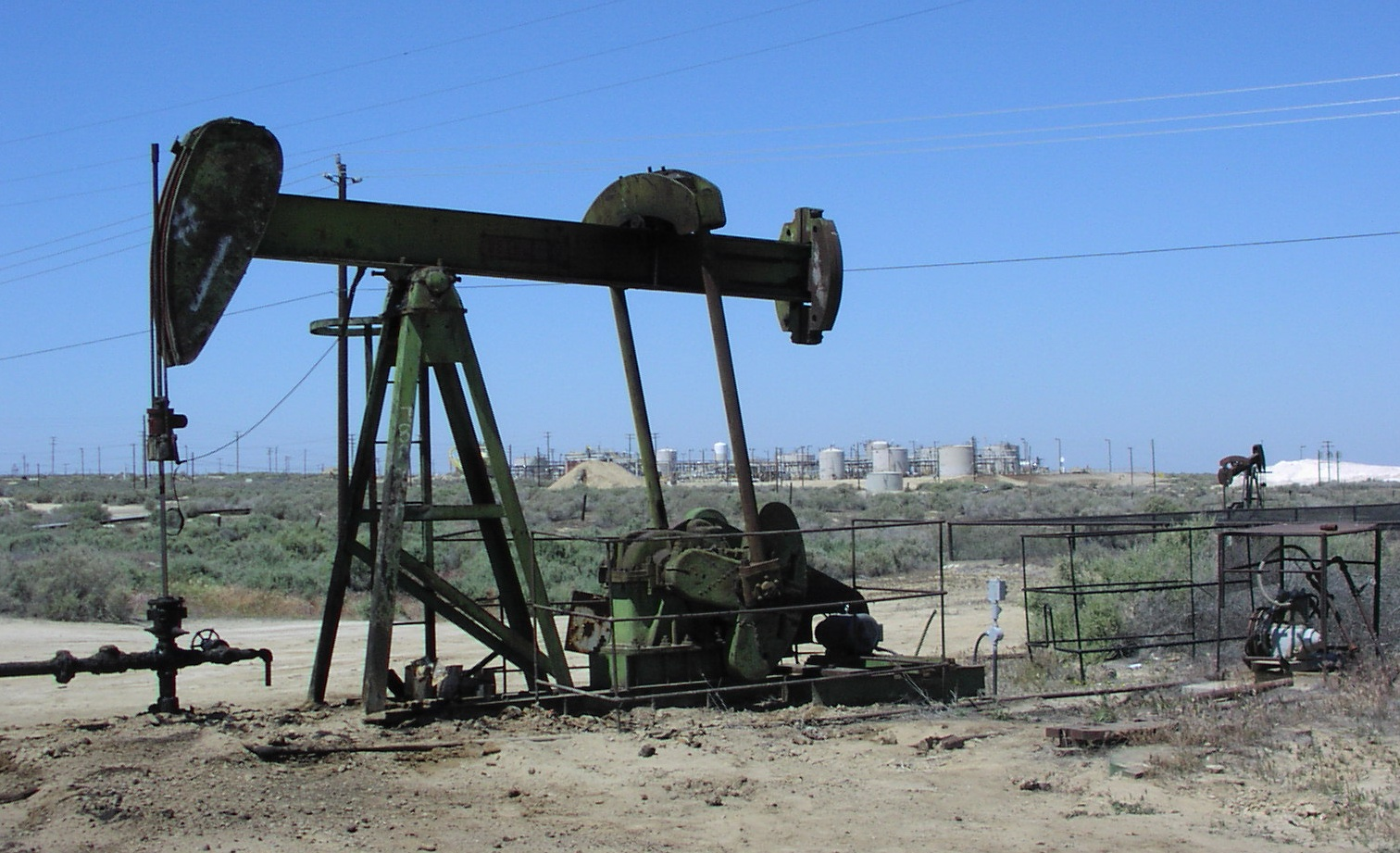
Oil well with storage tanks in the background: Lost Hills Field, April 2008

The Lost Hills Field is one of a series of oil fields along anticlines between the Coalinga Oil Field on the north and the Midway-Sunset Field on the south, along the western edge of the San Joaquin Valley. These anticlines run closely parallel to the San Andreas Fault to the west, and formed as a result of compression from tectonic movement. The Lost Hills Field occupies a portion of a SE-plunging anticline. There are six oil pools in the five producing units, which are, from the top, the Tulare Formation, of Pleistocene age; the Etchegoin Formation, of Pliocene age; the Reef Ridge Shale, McClure Shale, and Devilwater Shale, members of the Monterey Formation, of Miocene age, which can be found in much of coastal California; and the Temblor formation, underneath the others, of Oligocene and Miocene age. A well drilled to 11,553 feet (3,521 m) by Mobil Oil Corp. in the Williamson Lease identified further rock units as old as the Upper Cretaceous below the Temblor, but none of these lowest units have had oil pools.

The Belridge Diatomite portion of the Monterey Formation defines the productive limits of the field. Characteristic of this rock unit is that it is full of oil – almost 50% of the unit is saturated, and the unit has high porosity, in the 45% to 70% range – but very little of the oil has been recoverable from the unit (only three to four percent so far). According to Chevron's estimate, there are approximately 2.2 billion barrels (350,000,000 m^{3}) of oil in place in the Lost Hills Field, only five percent of which has been extracted. The oil in place is about twenty times greater than the California Department of Oil and Gas reserves estimate (109 million barrels (17,300,000 m^{3})), which is volume that can be economically produced.

Well spacing on Lost Hills varies based on the geologic characteristics in the unit being drilled, with one well per 5 acres (20,000 m^{2}) in siliceous shale to one well per 1.25 acres (5,100 m^{2}) in diatomite.

A peculiarity of the Lost Hills operations is the pronounced subsidence of the ground surface as it collapses into the area vacated by the petroleum after being pumped out. Portions of the hills overlying the oil field have subsided up to 8 feet (2.4 m) in the central region of operations, and subsidence occurs field-wide at a rate of about 9 inches (230 mm) per year. The dropping land surface causes operational problems, including fractures of well casings, and sometimes complete well failures. Waterflooding – the practice of filling the reservoir with water to push petroleum to recovery wells, and thereby also reoccupying the space vacated by oil and gas – has partially mitigated the problem. Some wells have actually disappeared into craters: in 1976, a Getty Oil well blew out, and quickly collapsed into a crater over 15 feet (4.6 m) deep and 30 feet (9.1 m), taking with it the concrete pad, casing, and pumping unit. Yet another Getty well suffered the same fate in 1978.

== History and operations ==
Drillers Martin and Dudley accidentally discovered the Lost Hills Oil Field in July 1910. They were drilling a water well for livestock grazing; instead of finding groundwater, however, they struck oil, specifically the Etchegoin Pool at a depth of 530 feet (160 m). Other drillers, encouraged by the find, including the mighty Standard Oil of California, which had recently been subject to antitrust litigation and broken up by the Supreme Court, began drilling for more nearby; they soon found the Cahn and Reef Ridge pools, in 1913, and then the Tulare pool in 1915. There were relatively few wells on the field for the first several decades; indeed, by 1979, there were only 39 wells producing from the Monterey Formation, and each of these wells only produced an average of eight barrels per day. It took the development of advanced recovery technology to turn the Lost Hills into a high-producing oil field.

Unusual for a California oil field, the years of maximum recovery were not early in the 20th century, but recently: peak oil production from the Etchegoin Pool did not occur until the early 21st century, assisted by several enhanced recovery technologies, including water flooding and cyclic steam flooding. The early peak in production took place in 1917, during which 4 million barrels (640,000 m^{3}) of oil were pumped; then production steadily declined, with a few spikes, until the enhanced recovery techniques which began to be employed in the 1960s began to pay off. In 1981 the field produced almost 6 million barrels (950,000 m^{3}), and has remained a high producer, reaching close to 12 million barrels (1,900,000 m^{3}) in 2006. During that year it had the fourth-largest production increase in the state, and preliminary estimates for 2007 show that production has increased yet again, to 12.2 million barrels (1,940,000 m^{3})

As of 1997, four pools – the Tulare, Etchegoin, Cahn, and Reef Ridge – continued to have active recovery operations using waterflooding, steam flooding, and fire flooding. As of 2008, the principal operators on the Lost Hills Field were Chevron Corp. and Aera Energy LLC.

=== Bellevue blowout ===
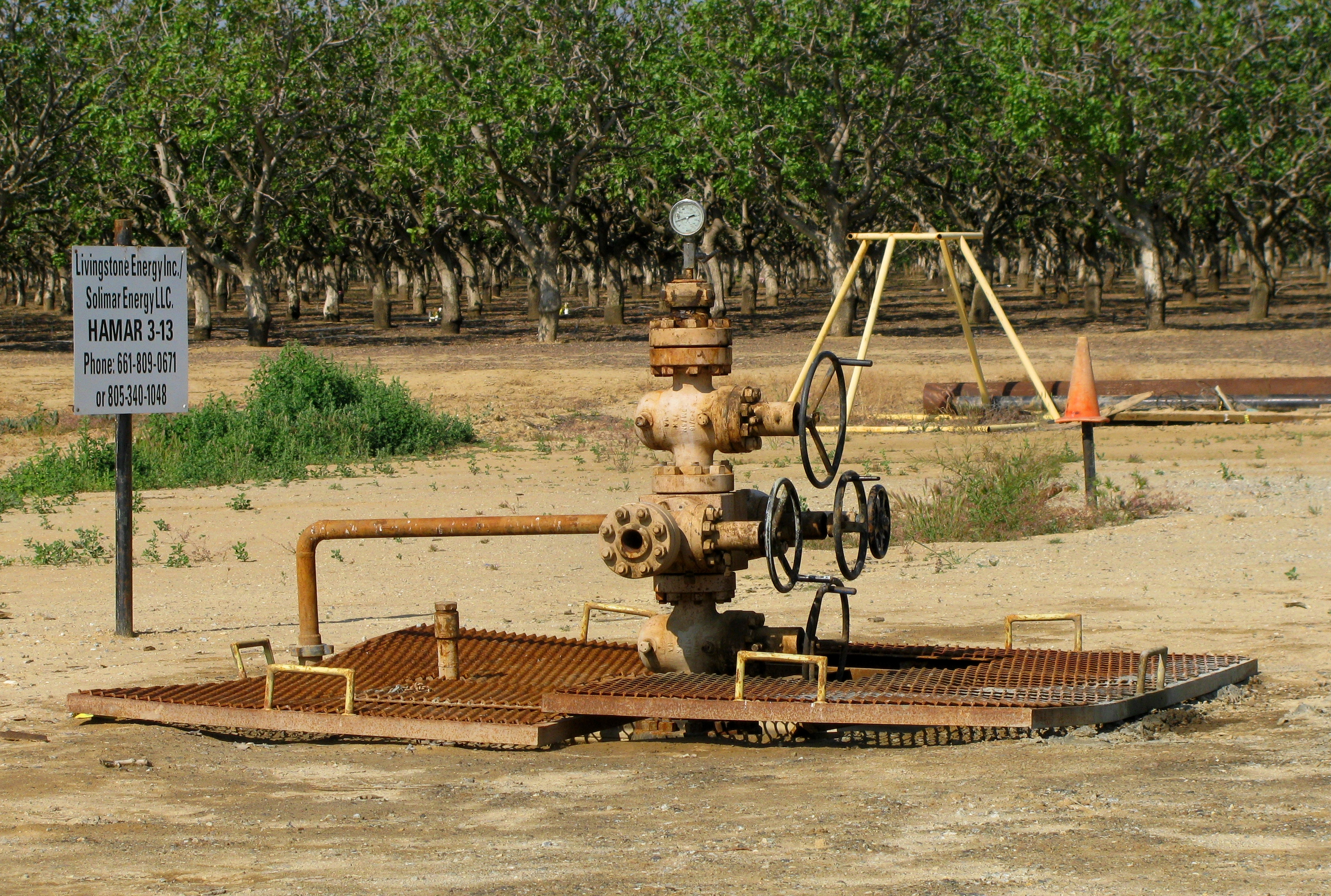
Natural gas well in the southeast extension of the Lost Hills Field, owned by Solimar and Livingstone Energy.

In 1998, the Lost Hills Field was the site of one of the largest and most spectacular well blowouts in modern U.S. history. The Bellevue blowout – also called the "Bellevue gusher" – involved six months of uncontrolled natural gas expulsion, and a gigantic gas fire that lasted two weeks.

On the evening of November 23, a wildcat well being drilled into a promising anticlinal fold underneath the Monterey Formation, northeast of the main Lost Hills field, reached the depth of 17,000 feet (5,200 m) and hit a previously untapped reservoir of gas under intense pressure. Natural gas and petroleum condensate burst from the well, immediately exploding into flame, knocking over the massive drilling rig, destroying the trailer, and melting the nearby drilling equipment. This enormous pillar of fire, which rose to 340 feet (100 m) into the sky, could be seen more than 40 miles (64 km) away, and the quantity of oil release was estimated at 2,000 barrels (320 m^{3}) of oil per day and gas bursting from the well has been estimated at 80 million cubic feet (2.3 million cubic metres) per day at standard conditions. It burned for fourteen days, and continued spewing even after the fire was out; only a secondary well bore, drilled at a slant to intercept the main well, was able to plug the opening and snuff the blowout at last.
