= Lost Hills =

Mountain range in Kern County, California

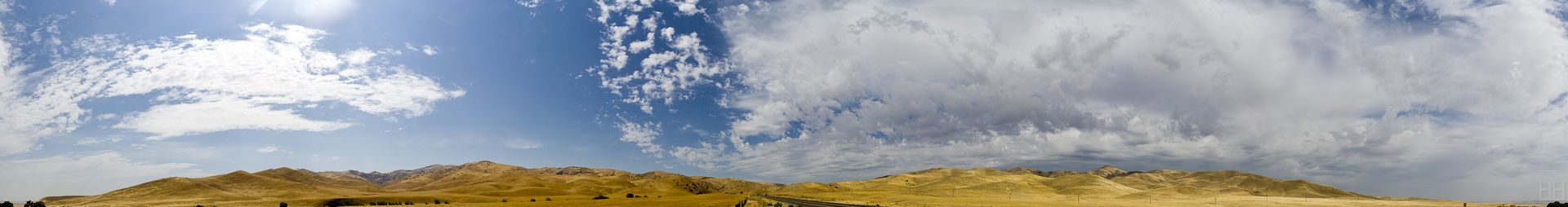
- Lost Hills Panorama

Highest point
- Elevation: 129 m (423 ft)

Geography
- Location within California Location within the United States
- Country: United States
- State: California
- District: Kern County
- Range coordinates: 35°38′04″N 119°44′49″W
- Topo map: USGS Lost Hills NW

The Lost Hills are a low mountain range in the Southern Inner Coast Ranges, near Lost Hills, California and Interstate 5 in western Kern County, California.

They contain the Lost Hills Oil Field, the largest oil field in Kern County, and are located in the southwestern San Joaquin Valley.
