= Lindsay Sproul =

American writer, editor, and educator

- Education: Columbia University
- Occupations: Writer; editor; professor
- Writing career
- Genres: Young Adult; Queer Studies; Short stories

Lindsay Sproul is an American writer, editor, and educator. She is the current editor-in-chief of the New Orleans Review and an assistant professor of creative writing at Loyola University New Orleans. Her debut young adult novel, We Were Promised Spotlights, was published in 2020.

== Education ==
Sproul received her bachelor of arts degree from Beloit College, her master of fine arts degree from Columbia University and her doctor of philosophy degree from Florida State University.

== Career ==
Sproul is an assistant professor of creative writing at Loyola University New Orleans, where she specializes in young adult fiction, queer literature and theory, gender studies and creative nonfiction.

Sproul has edited for the New Orleans Review since 2017, and became the magazine's editor-in-chief in late 2019.

Her short fiction has been published in Epoch, Glimmer Train, Witness, Porchlight, Massachusetts Review, Beloit Fiction Journal, and The Los Angeles Review. Sproul has received fellowships from Virginia Center for the Creative Arts in 2019 and the MacDowell Colony in 2017 and 2020.

We Were Promised Spotlights, a queer coming-of-age young adult novel, was published on March 24, 2020, by Penguin Random House. It earned positive reviews in Kirkus, The Massachusetts Review, School Library Journal, and Booklist.
