= 1962 TANFL season =

Australian rules football season

- Teams: Clarence Kangaroos; Glenorchy Magpies; Hobart Tigers; New Norfolk Eagles; North Hobart Robins; Sandy Bay Seagulls
- Premiers: Nth Hobart
- Minor premiers: Nth Hobart

Attendance
- Matches played: 64
- Total attendance: 232,826 (3,638 per match)

The 1962 Tasmanian Australian National Football League (TANFL) premiership season was an Australian Rules football competition staged in Hobart, Tasmania over twenty (20) roster rounds and four (4) finals series matches between 7 April and 22 September 1962.

== Participating Clubs ==
- Clarence District Football Club
- Glenorchy District Football Club
- Hobart Football Club
- New Norfolk District Football Club
- North Hobart Football Club
- Sandy Bay Football Club

=== 1962 TANFL Club Coaches ===
- Stuart Spencer (Clarence)
- John Chick (Glenorchy)
- Mal Pascoe (Hobart)
- Lyn Harris (New Norfolk)
- Darrell Eaton (North Hobart)
- Stan Booth (Sandy Bay)

=== TANFL Reserves Grand Final ===
(Saturday, 22 September 1962)

- Clarence 12.8 (80) v Sandy Bay 11.14 (80) – North Hobart Oval

=== TANFL Reserves Grand Final (Replay) ===
(Saturday, 29 September 1962)

- Clarence 9.15 (69) v Sandy Bay 7.10 (52) – North Hobart Oval

=== TANFL Under-19's Grand Final ===
State Schools Old Boys Football Association (SSOBFA)

- Lindisfarne 7.11 (53) v Clarence 4.9 (33) – New Town Oval

=== State Preliminary Final ===
(Saturday, 22 September 1962)

- Burnie Tigers 12.13 (85) v City-South 10.11 (71) – Att: 5,746 at York Park

=== State Grand Final ===
(Saturday, 29 September 1962)

- Nth Hobart: 2.0 (12) | 5.4 (34) | 7.8 (50) | 11.10 (76)
- Burnie Tigers: 2.4 (16) | 6.7 (43) | 9.9 (63) | 9.10 (64)
- Attendance: 7,640 at North Hobart Oval

=== Intrastate Matches ===
Jubilee Shield (Saturday, 26 May 1962)

- NWFU 14.16 (100) v TANFL 13.18 (96) – Att: 12,860 at North Hobart Oval

Jubilee Shield (Saturday, 9 June 1962)

- TANFL 19.22 (136) v NTFA 8.11 (59) – Att: 6,375 at York Park

=== Interstate Matches ===
Interstate Match (Monday, 4 June 1962)

- Victorian FA 12.15 (87) v Tasmania 12.9 (81) – Att: 13,000 at Devonport Oval

Interstate Match (Saturday, 16 June 1962)

- Victoria 11.19 (85) v Tasmania 5.13 (43) – Att: 15,310 at North Hobart Oval

=== Leading Goalkickers: TANFL ===
- David Collins (Nth Hobart) – 77
- Stuart Palfreyman (Sandy Bay) – 55
- Burnie Payne (Hobart) – 52
- R.Bailey (Nth Hobart) – 50
- Russell Newell (Clarence) – 41

=== Medal Winners ===
- Roger Browning (New Norfolk) – William Leitch Medal
- Bruce Felmingham (Nth Hobart) – George Watt Medal (Reserves)
- K.Weeding (Lindisfarne) – V.A Geard Medal (Under-19's)
- Denis Powell (Hobart) – Weller Arnold Medal (Best player in Intrastate matches)

== 1962 TANFL Ladder ==
Pos	Team	Pld	W	L	D	PF	PA	PP	Pts
1	North Hobart	20	15	5	0	1718	1291	133.1	60
2	Clarence	20	12	8	0	1561	1462	106.8	48
3	Hobart	20	11	8	1	1566	1601	97.8	46
4	Sandy Bay	20	10	9	1	1602	1360	117.8	42
5	Glenorchy	20	10	10	0	1372	1474	93.1	40
6	New Norfolk	20	1	19	0	1066	1688	63.2	14

=== Round 1 ===
(Saturday, 7 April 1962)

- Nth Hobart 16.18 (114) v Hobart 16.9 (105) – Att: 4,093 at North Hobart Oval
- Sandy Bay 13.16 (94) v Glenorchy 5.11 (41) – Att: 3,202 at Queenborough Oval
- Clarence 14.15 (99) v New Norfolk 5.17 (47) – Att: 3,337 at Bellerive Oval

=== Round 2 ===
(Saturday, 14 April 1962)

- Sandy Bay 14.11 (95) v New Norfolk 6.11 (47) – Att: 2,054 at North Hobart Oval
- Nth Hobart 17.11 (113) v Glenorchy 10.10 (70) – Att: 3,774 at KGV Park
- Clarence 13.12 (90) v Hobart 11.10 (76) – Att: 3,431 at TCA Ground

=== Round 3 ===
(Saturday, 21 April 1962)

- Clarence 15.17 (107) v Nth Hobart 7.8 (50) – Att: 7,681 at North Hobart Oval
- Hobart 12.11 (83) v Sandy Bay 10.22 (82) – Att: 1,876 at TCA Ground
- Glenorchy 9.13 (67) v New Norfolk 5.11 (41) – Att: 1,970 at Boyer Oval

=== Round 4 ===
(Monday, 23 April 1962)

- Nth Hobart 10.18 (78) v New Norfolk 7.13 (55) – Att: 2,129 at North Hobart Oval
- Sandy Bay 13.12 (90) v Clarence 9.11 (65) – Att: 4,011 at Queenborough Oval
- Glenorchy 11.18 (84) v Hobart 5.6 (36) – Att: 2,595 at KGV Park

=== Round 5 ===
(Saturday, 28 April 1962)

- Hobart 12.10 (82) v New Norfolk 9.11 (65) – Att: 1,415 at North Hobart Oval
- Nth Hobart 5.14 (44) v Sandy Bay 3.10 (28) – Att: 1,414 at Queenborough Oval
- Clarence 7.9 (51) v Glenorchy 6.4 (40) – Att: 1,619 at Bellerive Oval

=== Round 6 ===
(Saturday, 5 May 1962)

- Sandy Bay 17.14 (116) v Glenorchy 9.14 (68) – Att: 3,758 at North Hobart Oval
- Hobart 14.12 (96) v Nth Hobart 8.15 (63) – Att: 3,047 at TCA Ground
- Clarence 10.11 (71) v New Norfolk 5.11 (41) – Att: 2,041 at Boyer Oval

=== Round 7 ===
(Saturday, 12 May 1962)

- Glenorchy 12.11 (83) v Nth Hobart 11.14 (80) – Att: 2,556 at North Hobart Oval
- Sandy Bay 17.21 (123) v New Norfolk 9.5 (59) – Att: 2,999 at Queenborough Oval
- Clarence 13.10 (88) v Hobart 10.8 (68) – Att: 4,292 at TCA Ground

=== Round 8 ===
(Saturday, 19 May 1962)

- Hobart 13.13 (91) v Sandy Bay 13.13 (91) – Att: 3,235 at North Hobart Oval
- Glenorchy 12.10 (82) v New Norfolk 9.15 (69) – Att: 2,124 at KGV Park
- Nth Hobart 15.21 (111) v Clarence 7.7 (49) – Att: 3,222 at Bellerive Oval

=== Round 9 ===
(Saturday, 2 June & Monday, 4 June 1962)

- Clarence 13.16 (94) v Sandy Bay 11.12 (78) – Att: 5,456 at North Hobart Oval
- Nth Hobart 7.15 (57) v New Norfolk 5.4 (34) – Att: 1,555 at Boyer Oval
- Hobart 9.7 (61) v Glenorchy 3.16 (34) – Att: 4,539 at North Hobart Oval (Monday)

=== Round 10 ===
(Saturday, 9 June 1962)

- Nth Hobart 14.7 (91) v Sandy Bay 7.13 (55) – Att: 3,322 at North Hobart Oval
- Hobart 11.10 (76) v New Norfolk 10.9 (69) – Att: 1,338 at TCA Ground
- Clarence 11.9 (75) v Glenorchy 6.10 (46) – Att: 2,753 at KGV Park

=== Round 11 ===
(Saturday, 23 June 1962)

- Nth Hobart 23.11 (149) v Hobart 5.9 (39) – Att: 4,063 at North Hobart Oval
- Glenorchy 10.5 (65) v Sandy Bay 6.14 (50) – Att: 2,085 at Queenborough Oval
- Clarence 14.13 (97) v New Norfolk 2.11 (23) – Att: 2,036 at Bellerive Oval

=== Round 12 ===
(Saturday, 30 June 1962)

- Hobart 18.12 (120) v Clarence 17.8 (110) – Att: 4,085 at North Hobart Oval
- Nth Hobart 5.13 (43) v Glenorchy 4.13 (37) – Att: 3,072 at KGV Park
- Sandy Bay 13.6 (84) v New Norfolk 5.7 (37) – Att: 1,306 at Boyer Oval

=== Round 13 ===
(Saturday, 7 July 1962)

- Clarence 9.9 (63) v Nth Hobart 6.8 (44) – Att: 5,348 at North Hobart Oval
- Hobart 13.8 (86) v Sandy Bay 11.12 (78) – Att: 2,745 at TCA Ground
- Glenorchy 14.12 (96) v New Norfolk 7.11 (53) – Att: 1,721 at KGV Park

=== Round 14 ===
(Saturday, 14 July 1962)

- Nth Hobart 12.16 (88) v New Norfolk 12.9 (81) – Att: 1,670 at North Hobart Oval
- Glenorchy 11.11 (77) v Hobart 10.9 (69) – Att: 2,604 at TCA Ground
- Sandy Bay 10.10 (70) v Clarence 9.7 (61) – Att: 3,535 at Bellerive Oval

=== Round 15 ===
(Saturday, 21 July 1962)

- Glenorchy 17.19 (121) v Clarence 11.14 (80) – Att: 4,987 at North Hobart Oval
- Nth Hobart 8.11 (59) v Sandy Bay 7.13 (55) – Att: 2,966 at Queenborough Oval
- Hobart 7.22 (64) v New Norfolk 5.6 (36) – Att: 1,283 at Boyer Oval

=== Round 16 ===
(Saturday, 28 July 1962)

- Clarence 10.11 (71) v New Norfolk 10.5 (65) – Att: 2,181 at North Hobart Oval
- Hobart 14.8 (92) v Nth Hobart 11.11 (77) – Att: 2,872 at TCA Ground
- Sandy Bay 16.13 (109) v Glenorchy 7.14 (56) – Att: 3,916 at KGV Park

=== Round 17 ===
(Saturday, 4 August 1962)

- Nth Hobart 12.14 (86) v Glenorchy 7.13 (55) – Att: 4,695 at North Hobart Oval
- Hobart 14.10 (94) v Clarence 9.19 (73) – Att: 2,966 at Bellerive Oval
- Sandy Bay 11.7 (73) v New Norfolk 10.4 (64) – Att: 1,412 at Boyer Oval

=== Round 18 ===
(Saturday, 11 August 1962)

- Glenorchy 11.16 (82) v New Norfolk 9.7 (61) – Att: 2,144 at North Hobart Oval
- Hobart 12.11 (83) v Sandy Bay 12.7 (79) – Att: 3,328 at Queenborough Oval
- Nth Hobart 17.9 (111) v Clarence 9.7 (61) – Att: 3,351 at Bellerive Oval

=== Round 19 ===
(Saturday, 18 August 1962)

- Glenorchy 13.16 (94) v Hobart 13.12 (90) – Att: 4,204 at North Hobart Oval
- Sandy Bay 12.15 (87) v Clarence 8.11 (59) – Att: 3,880 at Queenborough Oval
- Nth Hobart 23.15 (153) v New Norfolk 9.7 (61) – Att: 1,192 at Boyer Oval

=== Round 20 ===
(Saturday, 25 August 1962)

- Nth Hobart 16.11 (107) v Sandy Bay 9.11 (65) – Att: 5,195 at North Hobart Oval
- Clarence 14.13 (97) v Glenorchy 10.14 (74) – Att: 4,007 at KGV Park
- New Norfolk 9.4 (58) v Hobart 7.8 (50) – Att: 1,008 at Boyer Oval

=== First Semi Final ===
(Saturday, 1 September 1962)

- Sandy Bay: 2.1 (13) | 6.2 (38) | 8.2 (50) | 10.5 (65)
- Hobart: 3.1 (19) | 4.4 (28) | 6.10 (46) | 8.13 (61)
- Attendance: 9,233 at North Hobart Oval

=== Second Semi Final ===
(Saturday, 8 September 1962)

- Nth Hobart: 2.4 (16) | 3.6 (24) | 5.8 (38) | 7.10 (52)
- Clarence: 1.1 (7) | 2.4 (16) | 6.6 (42) | 6.8 (44)
- Attendance: 10,177 at North Hobart Oval

=== Preliminary Final ===
(Saturday, 15 September 1962)

- Clarence: 2.2 (14) | 5.4 (34) | 6.9 (45) | 10.14 (74)
- Sandy Bay: 1.1 (7) | 5.5 (35) | 7.6 (48) | 8.7 (55)
- Attendance: 13,410 at North Hobart Oval

=== Grand Final ===
(Saturday, 22 September 1962)

- Nth Hobart: 2.2 (14) | 7.5 (47) | 8.8 (56) | 10.12 (72)
- Clarence: 2.2 (14) | 3.7 (25) | 5.11 (41) | 7.15 (57)
- Attendance: 19,311 at North Hobart Oval

Source: All scores and statistics courtesy of the Hobart Mercury and Saturday Evening Mercury (SEM) publications.
