= Robert Auchmuty Sproule =

Canadian artist (died 1845)

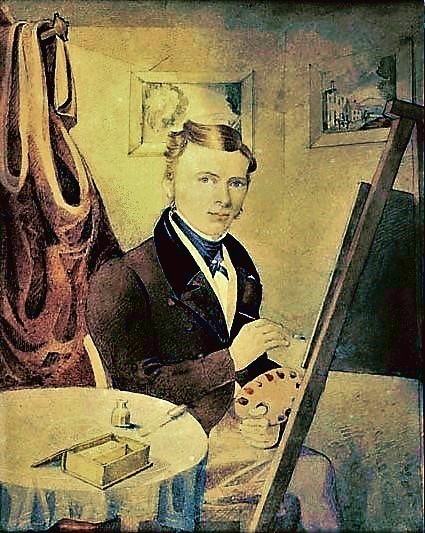
- Born: Athlone, Ireland
- Died: 1845; March Township, Upper Canada
- Known for: artist in watercolours which, made into lithographs, established lithography in the colony of Canada
- Spouse: Jane Hopper (m. 1831)

Robert Auchmuty Sproule was an early artist in Canada, known through prints made from his watercolours. His prints were the beginning of lithography in the colony.

== Biography ==
Sproule was born in Athlone, Ireland, second son of Commander Thomas Sproule RN and his wife Marianne (nee Ardesoif). He emigrated to Lower Canada in 1826 and established himself as an artist who made miniatures in Montreal, advertising that he had studied art in London and Dublin.

In 1830, his six views of Montreal were published, engraved on copperplate from his watercolours. Curators consider them the "most handsome series published in Canada" and that they "demonstrate the maturity achieved in pictorial printmaking during the first half of the 19th century".

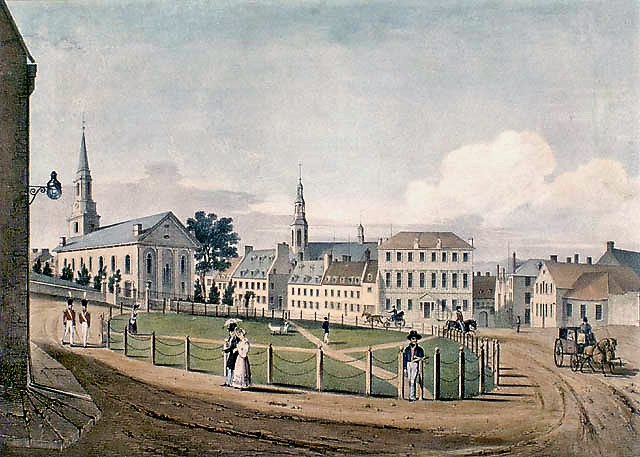
Vue de la Place d Armes de Quebec en 1832

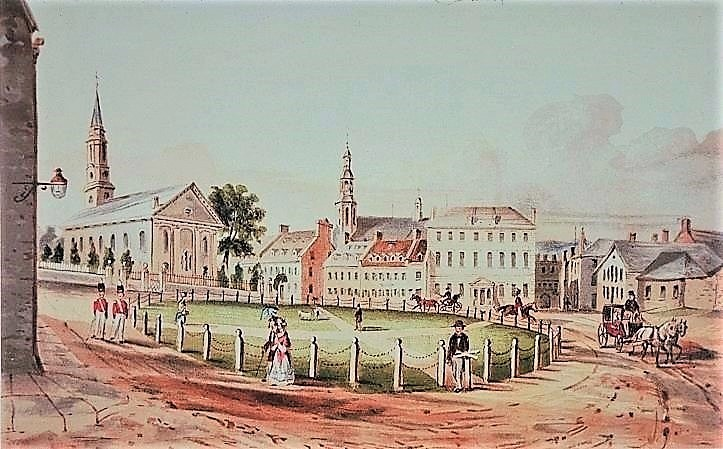
Place d Armes Quebec 1832

Sproule continued creating watercolours (such as this view in Library and Archives Canada) to be made into prints (McCord Museum) and even publishing lithographs himself for the next four years. It marked the beginning of lithography in the colony as his publisher, Adolphus Bourne, bought a lithography press in London, England and brought it back to Montreal to print Sproule's work.

Sproule also taught drawing in Montreal. He and his family made several moves, all in Upper Canada: to Cornwall (around 1836), Williamstown (around 1838), and finally the Bytown (Ottawa) region. In 1839, he lived in Huntley, then March Township (1840). In 1844, he advertised himself as a miniaturist and drawing-master in Bytown. When he died in 1845, he was reported to have been still living in March Township.

In Canada, his work is in the collections of the McCord Museum, the National Gallery of Canada, Library and Archives Canada, the Royal Ontario Museum, the Musée national des beaux-arts du Québec, the Bibliothèque et Archives nationales du Québec, and in England, the National Trust Collections, and elsewhere.
