= John Mosier =

American academic

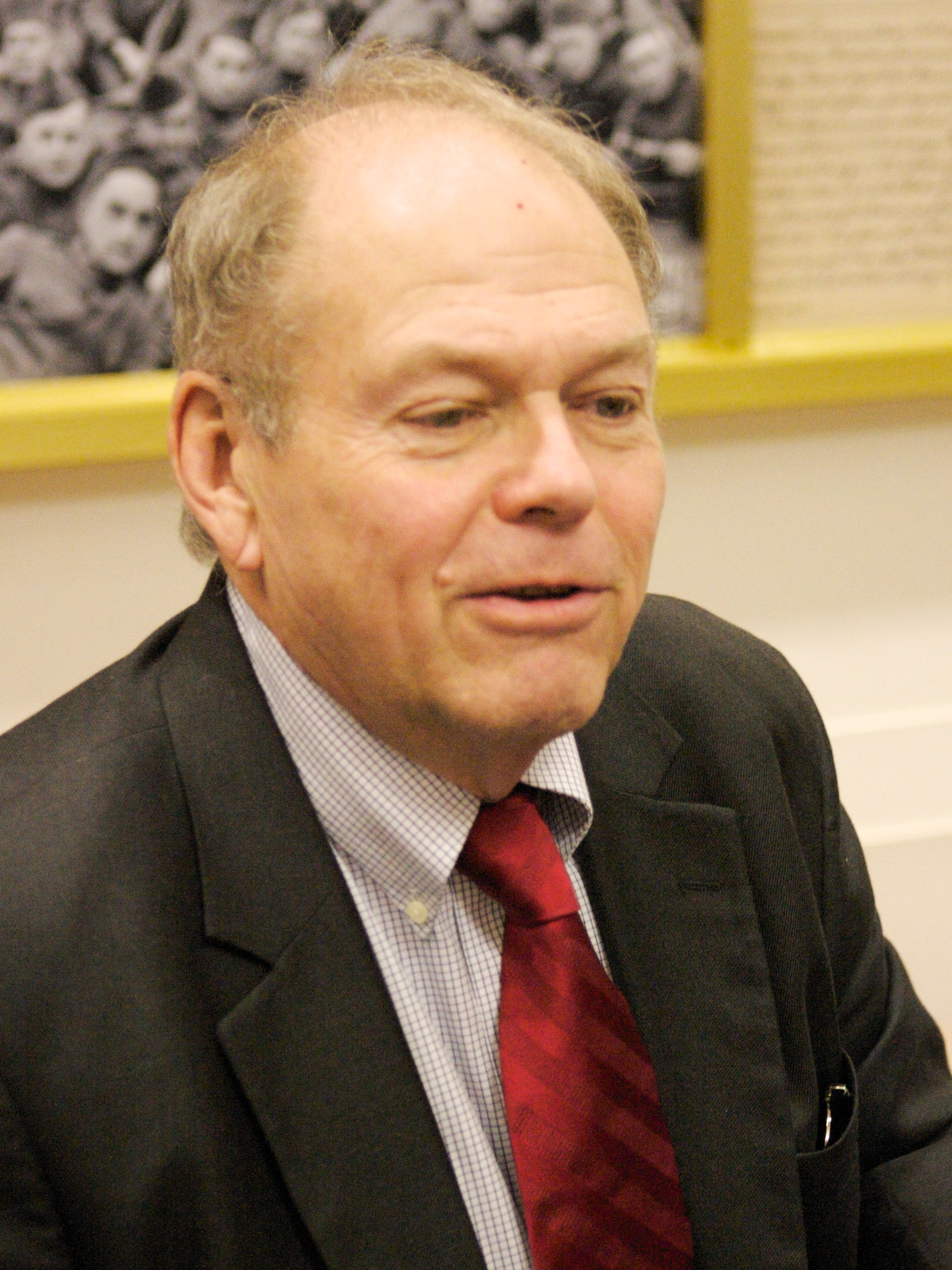
Mosier in 2010

John Mosier is an American academic known for his work in English, film, and history. Mosier was formerly a professor of English at Loyola University New Orleans.

Mosier received his Ph.D. in 1968, from Tulane University. He completed his dissertation on the links between poetry and historiography.

Mosier is probably best known for his revisionist military history books. These books The Myth of the Great War: A New Military History of World War I and The Blitzkrieg Myth: How Hitler and the Allies Misread the Strategic Realities of World War II. In each of these books, Mosier challenges the current views held in regard to these conflicts. In The Myth of the Great War, Mosier argues that Germany was winning World War I, and only the arrival of the United States spared the Allies from military defeat and a negotiated peace with the Germans. In The Blitzkrieg Myth, Mosier argues that the supposedly revolutionary concept of blitzkrieg has been overrated and that most of the victories on both sides were the result of conventional military tactics. Both of these books and their theses remain controversial. In his 2010 book Deathride: Hitler vs. Stalin - The Eastern Front, 1941-1945, he posits that the Germans would surely have defeated the Soviets if not for the Allies, and that one of the Russians' problems is that they were "pathological liars".

He also published a military biography of Ulysses S. Grant. The book was revisionist in method; however, his thesis focused on the more traditional view that Grant was a genius. This deviates from Mosier's previous revisionist tendencies.

In addition to his books on military history, Mosier is a former film critic and serves on Cannes Film Festival committees. He also works as writer and editor for publications such as the journal of the Organization of American States.

== Bibliography ==
- The Myth of the Great War: A New Military History of World War I, Harper Perennial, 2002, paperback, 381 pages, ISBN 0-06-008433-2
- The Blitzkrieg Myth: How Hitler and the Allies Misread the Strategic Realities of World War II HarperCollins, 2003, hardcover, 400 pages, ISBN 0-06-000976-4
- Cross of Iron: The Rise And Fall of the German War Machine, 1918-1945, Henry Holt & Co, 2006, hardcover, 336 pages, ISBN 0-8050-7577-1
- Grant, Palgrave Macmillan, 2006, hardcover, 193 pages, ISBN 1-4039-7136-6
- Deathride: Hitler vs. Stalin - The Eastern Front, 1941-1945, Simon & Schuster, 2010, hardcover, 480 pages, ISBN 978-1-4165-7350-0
- Verdun: The Lost History of the Most Important Battle of World War One, 1914-1918, Dutton Caliber, 2014, ISBN 9780451414632

== Criticism ==
Mosier has come under criticism, with some scholars calling his work "deeply flawed" and "dreadful". The Myth of the Great War: A New Military History of World War I has been said to have a "contempt for history," and overlooks huge parts of history that debunk the narrative being created. He has been criticized for drawing too heavily on secondary sources and his list of sources has similarly been referred to as "limited". Mitchell Yockelson has this to say:

Even though historians on both sides of the Atlantic have proven this study unreliable, including a reviewer in this journal, Mosier believes Winter's claim that "the American archives, like the British, were rifled." It is hard to take such a statement seriously when no evidence exists that Mosier conducted any research in the primary AEF and BEF records. He defends his lack of primary research by suggesting: "Historians operate under the conviction that archival research is the be all and end all of their profession."

Yockelson does still acknowledge that Mosier's work does help fuel scholarly debate, even though there are inaccuracies. Spencer C. Tucker similarly acknowledges that though The Myth of the Great War: A New Military History of World War I has its errors, it is nonetheless thought-provoking.
