= John Biguenet =

American dramatist

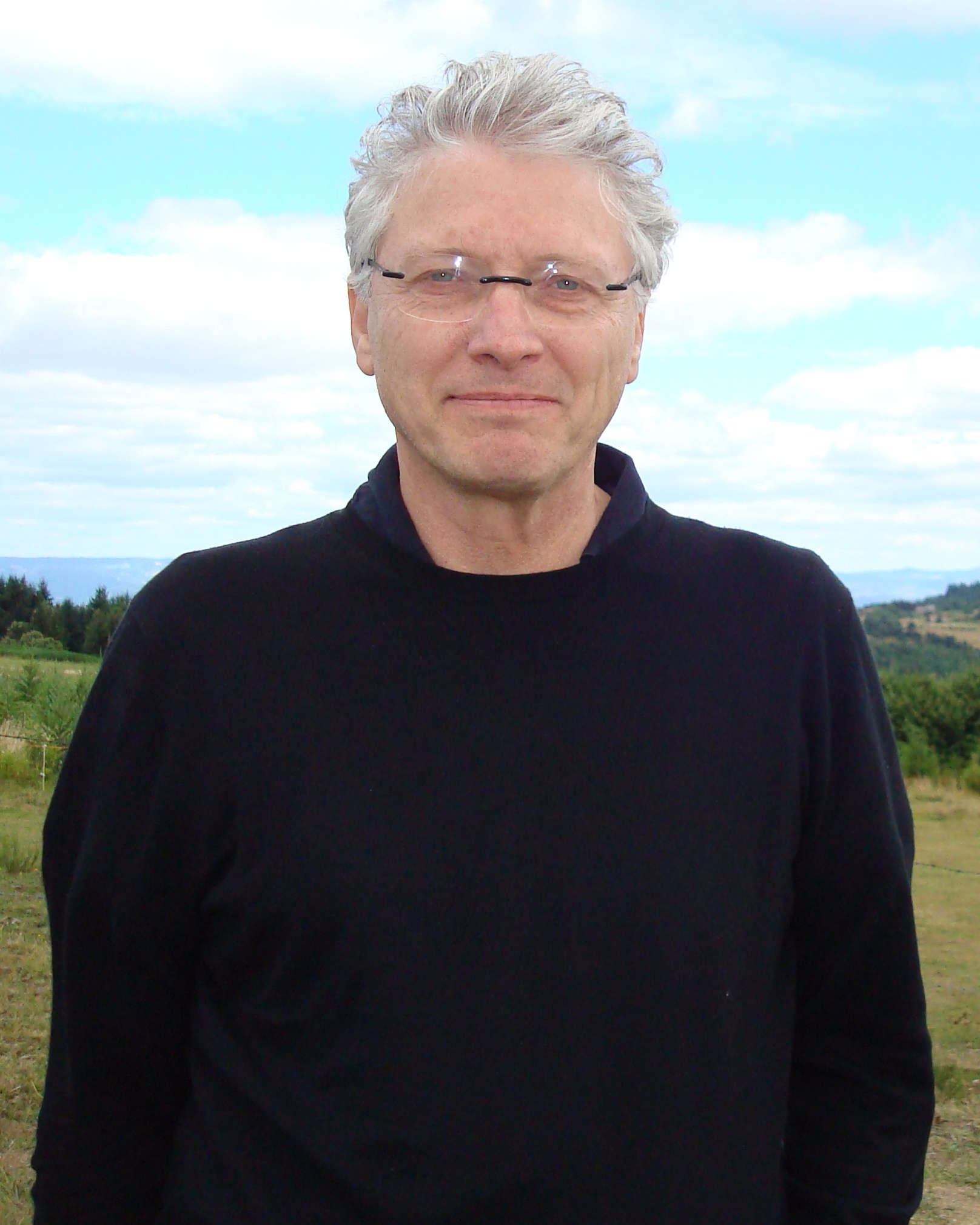
John Biguenet

John Biguenet is an American author. He has published seven books, including Oyster and The Torturer's Apprentice Stories, released in the United States by Ecco/HarperCollins and widely translated, as well as six plays. His work has received an O. Henry Award for short fiction and his poems, stories, plays and essays have been reprinted or cited in The Best American Mystery Stories, Prize Stories: The O. Henry Awards, The Best American Short Stories, Best Music Writing, Contemporary Poetry in America, Katrina on Stage and various other anthologies. His work has appeared in such magazines as Granta, Esquire, North American Review, Oxford American, Playboy (Rome), Story, and Zoetrope. As a guest columnist and blogger for The New York Times, Biguenet wrote about his return to New Orleans after its catastrophic flooding during Hurricane Katrina and the city's efforts.

== Works ==
Biguenet’s radio play Wundmale, which premiered on Westdeutscher Rundfunk, Germany's largest radio network, was rebroadcast by Österreichischer Rundfunk, the Austrian national radio and television network. Two of his stories have been featured in Selected Shorts at Symphony Space on Broadway, Long Wharf Theatre, and elsewhere. The Vulgar Soul won the 2004 Southern New Plays Festival and was a featured production in 2005 at Southern Rep Theatre; he and the play were profiled in American Theatre magazine. Rising Water was the winner of the 2006 National New Play Network Commission Award, a 2006 National Showcase of New Plays selection and a 2007 recipient of an Access to Artistic Excellence development and production grant from the National Endowment for the Arts as well as the 2007 Big Easy Theatre Award for Best Original Play, it has had numerous productions around the country.

Shotgun, the second play in his Rising Water cycle, premiered in 2009 at Southern Rep Theatre, with subsequent productions at the Orlando Shakespeare Theater and Florida Studio Theatre, both in 2010; it won a 2009 National New Play Network Continued Life of New Plays Fund Award and was a 2009 recipient of an Access to Artistic Excellence development and production grant from the National Endowment for the Arts. Mold, the final play in the trilogy, premiered in 2013 at Southern Rep Theatre. This trilogy of plays about the flooding of New Orleans has been the subject of articles in American Theatre, The American Scholar, and elsewhere.

He was awarded a Marquette Fellowship for the writing of Night Train, which he developed on a Studio Attachment at the National Theatre in London and which premiered at New Jersey Rep Theatre in 2011. After performances at five new-play festivals and reading series, his play Broomstick won a National New Play Network Continued Life of New Plays Fund Award, premiering in an extended run at New Jersey Repertory Company in 2013 and afterwards produced at Montana Repertory Theatre, Southern Rep Theatre, Fountain Theatre (Los Angeles), and Playwrights Theatre of New Jersey in 2014. Broomstick will be produced by Artists Repertory Theatre in October 2015.

In 2008, Biguenet was named Theatre Person of the Year at the Big Easy Theatre Awards, the region’s major professional theater awards. He received the Louisiana Writer Award in 2012.

Having served twice as president of the American Literary Translators Association and as writer-in-residence at various universities, he is currently the Robert Hunter Distinguished University Professor at Loyola University in New Orleans.

== Books ==
- Oyster (Trade PB, ISBN 0-06-019836-2)
- The Torturer's Apprentice (Trade PB, ISBN 0-06-000745-1); (HC ISBN 0-06-019835-4)
- Shotgun (Trade PB, ISBN 978-0-8222-2500-3)
- Silence (Bloomsbury, Object Lessons series, ISBN 9781628921465)
