= List of editorial cartoonists =

This is a list of editorial cartoonists of the past and present sorted by nationality. An editorial cartoonist is an artist, a cartoonist who draws editorial cartoons that contain some level of political or social commentary. The list is incomplete; it lists only those editorial cartoonists for whom a Wikipedia article already exists.

== International ==
- Patrick Chappatte, International New York Times
- Kal, The Economist

== Algeria ==
- Ali Dilem

== Argentina ==
- Miguel Brascó

== Australia ==
- Dean Alston
- Patrick Cook
- Stan Cross
- John Ditchburn
- William Ellis Green
- Arthur Horner
- Geoff "Jeff" Hook
- Mark Knight
- Bill Leak
- Michael Leunig
- Stewart McCrae
- Malcolm McGookin
- Alan Moir
- George Molnar
- Peter Nicholson
- Pat Oliphant
- Ward O'Neill
- Bruce Petty
- Larry Pickering
- Geoff Pryor
- Paul Rigby, News Corporation
- David Rowe The Australian Financial Review
- Dan Russell
- Jim Russell
- John Spooner
- Cathy Wilcox
- Paul Zanetti

== Bangladesh ==
- Arifur Rahman, Toons Mag
- Khalil Rahman, The Daily Jugantor

== Belgium ==
- Didier Dubucq
- Gal
- Philippe Geluck
- Kamagurka
- Karl Meersman
- Jef Nys
- Félicien Rops
- Marc Sleen

== Brazil ==
- Carlos Latuff
- Manuel de Araújo Porto-Alegre (19th century)

== Canada ==
- Aislin (Terry Mosher), The Montreal Gazette
- Bado (Guy Badeaux)
- Sid Barron
- Al Beaton, Toronto Telegram
- John Wilson Bengough
- Blaine (Blaine MacDonald)
- Stewart Cameron
- Roy Carless
- Bob Chambers
- Serge Chapleau
- Fred Curatolo
- Michael de Adder, Halifax Daily News
- Andy Donato, Toronto Sun
- Brian Gable
- Graeme MacKay, Mackay Cartoons
- Bruce MacKinnon
- Duncan Macpherson
- Len Norris
- Roy Peterson
- André Pijet
- Adrian Raeside
- Vic Roschkov, Sr.
- Wyatt Tremblay
- Kerry Waghorn
- Avrom Yanovsky

== China ==
- Wuheqilin (Fu Yu 付昱)

== Colombia ==
- Vladdo (Vladimir Flórez)

== Denmark ==
- Roald Als

== Egypt ==
- Mustafa Hussein
- Ahmed Toughan

== France ==
- Diego Aranega
- Jean-François Batellier
- Cabu
- Honoré Daumier
- André Gill
- Robert Lassalvy
- Étienne Lécroart
- Luz
- Chantal Montellier
- Amédée de Noé, aka Cham
- René Pétillon
- Françoise Pichard
- Plantu
- Jean-Marc Reiser
- Riss
- Siné
- Charles-Joseph Traviès de Villers (born in Switzerland)

== Finland ==
- Kari Suomalainen, Helsingin Sanomat

== Greece ==
- Chrysanthos Mentis Bostantzoglou (also known as Bost; Greek: Μποστ)

== India ==
- Sudhir Dar
- Shekhar Gurera
- Kutty
- R. K. Laxman
- Manjul
- Shankar Pamarthy
- Vasant Sarwate
- Sudhir Tailang
- Bal Thackeray
- Tulal
- E. P. Unni
- Mir Suhail Qadri

== Iran ==
- Bozorgmehr Hosseinpour
- Nikahang Kowsar
- Mana Neyestani
- Maziar Bijani

== Ireland ==
- Arthur Booth
- Gordon Brewster
- W. H. Conn
- John Doyle ("H.B.")
- Thomas Fitzpatrick
- Rowel Friers
- Harry Furniss
- Grace Gifford
- Charles E. Kelly
- Ian Knox
- J. D. Reigh
- Martyn Turner

== Israel ==
- Gideon Amichay
- "Dosh" (Kariel Gardosh)
- Dudu Geva
- Avi Katz
- Michel Kichka
- Ranan Lurie
- Ze'ev

== Japan ==
- Susumu Matsushita

== Jordan ==
- Khaldoon Gharaibeh

== Lebanon ==
- Mahmoud Kahil, Asharq Al-Awsat, Al Majalla, Courrier International

== Malaysia ==
- Lat

== Mexico ==
- Paco Calderón
- Antonio Helguera

== Morocco ==
- Abdellah Derkaoui

== Nepal ==
- Rabi Mishra

== Netherlands ==
- Johan Braakensiek
- Bastiaan Geleijnse
- Albert Hahn
- Gregorius Nekschot
- Louis Raemaekers
- John Reid
- Peter van Straaten
- Jean-Marc van Tol
- Willem

== New Zealand ==
- Jeff Bell, The Dominion Post, Waikato Times, Stuff, Stuff Jeff Bell Cartoons
- William Blomfield
- Guy Body, The NZ Herald, Guy Body’s Website
- Bob Brockie, National Business Review
- Peter Bromhead, Marlborough Express
- Anthony Ellison
- Malcolm Evans
- Allan Hawkey, Waikato Times
- Eric Heath
- Trace Hodgson, Listener , NZ Truth, New Zealand herald, Trace Hodgson’s Cartoons
- Jim Hubbard, The Dominion Post, Waikato Times, Jim Hubbard’s Cartoons
- John Kent - (Varoomshka)
- Paul McDonald, The Hawkes Bay Herald Tribune, politicalcartoons.nz, "scoop nz"
- Sharon Murdoch, Sunday Star Times, The Press, Dominion Post
- Gordon Minhinnick, New Zealand Herald
- Sid Scales, Otago Daily Times
- Tom Scott, The Dominion Post
- Chris Slane, Chris Slane’s Cartoons
- Garrick Tremain

== Norway ==
- Morten Mørland, The Times
- Arifur Rahman

== Pakistan ==
- Yusuf Lodhi

== Palestine ==
- Naji al-Ali
- Mohammad Saba'aneh
- Emad Hajjaj

== Poland ==
- Zbigniew Lengren

== Portugal ==
- Bordalo Pinheiro, Rafael, Zé Povinho

== Romania ==
- Gogu Neagoe

== Russia ==
- Boris Efimov

== Saudi Arabia ==
- Hana Hajjar, Arab News

== Serbia ==
- Dušan Petričić
- Predrag Koraksić Corax

== Singapore ==
- Heng Kim Song

== South Africa ==
- Jeremy Nell
- Zapiro

== South Korea ==
- Kim Sung Whan

== Spain ==
- Kap, La Vanguardia, El Mundo Deportivo
- Antonio Lara de Gavilán
- Mingote, ABC

== Switzerland ==
- Patrick Chappatte

== Tunisia ==
- Z

== Thailand ==
- Kai Maew
- Mor, Bangkok Post and Krungthep Thurakij
- Chai Rachawat, Thairath

== Turkey ==
- Cem Kızıltuğ, Zaman
- Salih Memecan, Sabah
- Emre Ozdemir, Zaman

== United Kingdom ==
- Ewen Bain, Daily Record, Scots Independent
- Steve Bell, The Guardian
- Rupert Besley, Isle of Wight County Press
- Peter Brookes, The Times
- Peter Clark, The Guardian
- Charles Exeter Devereux Crombie
- Michael Cummings, Daily Express
- Stanley Arthur Franklin, Daily Mirror and The Sun
- Nicholas Garland, Daily Telegraph
- Les Gibbard
- Carl Giles
- William Hogarth, 18th century
- Richard Horne
- Jak, Evening Standard
- Mahmoud Kahil, Asharq Al-Awsat, Al Majalla, Courrier International
- David Low
- Malcolm McGookin
- William Papas, The Guardian
- Jonathan Pugh, The Times and The Daily Mail
- Chris Riddell, The Observer
- John Tenniel
- Edward Tennyson Reed, Punch (19th and 20th Century)
- Martin Rowson, The Guardian
- Gerald Scarfe, The Sunday Times and The New Yorker
- Peter Schrank
- Clive Uptton
- Victor Vicky Weisz
- Dyke White, Daily Record and The Scottish Daily Express
- Philip Zec, Daily Mirror

== United States ==
- Lalo Alcaraz, LA Weekly
- F.O. Alexander, Philadelphia Bulletin
- Nick Anderson, Houston Chronicle
- Bob Artley
- Chuck Asay, Creators Syndicate
- Tony Auth, Philadelphia Inquirer
- Pat Bagley, Salt Lake Tribune
- Clifford H. Baldowski
- Cornelia Barns
- Darrin Bell
- Khalil Bendib
- Clay Bennett, Chattanooga Times Free Press
- Steve Benson, Arizona Republic
- Oscar Berger
- Randy Bish, Pittsburgh Tribune-Review
- Chip Bok, Akron Beacon Journal
- Ruben Bolling, Tom the Dancing Bug
- Jim Borgman, Cincinnati Enquirer
- Matt Bors, United Media, United Features Syndicate
- Luther D. Bradley, Chicago Daily News
- Steve Breen, San Diego Union-Tribune
- Steve Brodner
- Jacob Burck, Chicago Sun-Times
- Daryl Cagle, Cagle Cartoons
- Stuart Carlson, Milwaukee Journal Sentinel
- William Charles (1776–1820)
- Earle D. Chesney
- Ron Cobb, Los Angeles Free Press
- Paul Conrad, Tribune Media Services
- Bill Crawford, United Media, NEA
- Stacy Curtis
- Jeff Danziger, Los Angeles Times Syndicate
- Jay Norwood Darling, Des Moines Register
- Bill Day, Cagle Cartoons
- Sean Delonas, New York Post
- Liza Donnelly, The New Yorker Magazine
- Robert W. Edgren, The Evening World
- Bob Englehart, The Hartford Courant
- Charles Evenden
- Jules Feiffer
- Charles Fincher, LawComix
- Mark Fiore
- Daniel R. Fitzpatrick, St. Louis Post Dispatch (two-time Pulitzer prize)
- Mike Flugennock
- Joe Fournier, Chicago Tribune
- Michael Fry, Houston Post
- Ben Garrison
- Thomas F. Gibson
- John "DOK" Hager, Seattle Times
- Walt Handelsman, New Orleans Advocate & Tribune Content Agency
- Harold R. Heaton
- Joe Heller, Green Bay Press-Gazette
- Herblock, The Washington Post
- Dick Hodgins, Jr.
- Jerry Holbert, Boston Herald
- Ed Holland, Chicago Tribune
- David Horsey, Tribune Content Agency
- Karl Hubenthal, Los Angeles Hearst newspapers
- Etta Hulme, Fort Worth Star-Telegram
- Barry Hunau, J. The Jewish News of Northern California
- Frank Interlandi, Des Moines Register, Los Angeles Times
- Cecil Jensen
- Kerry G. Johnson
- Clay Jones, The Free Lance-Star
- Kevin Kallaugher, The Economist, Baltimore Sun
- Steve Kelley, Times-Picayune
- Kelly, The Onion
- Warren King
- Keith Knight, The K Chronicles, (Th)ink
- Jeff Koterba, Omaha World Herald
- Lyle Lahey
- Mike Lester, Rome News-Tribune
- Mike Luckovich, Atlanta Journal-Constitution
- Ranan Lurie
- Miel Prudencio Ma
- Craig MacIntosh
- Jeff MacNelly, Chicago Tribune
- Reg Manning, Arizona Republic
- Jimmy Margulies, The Record (Bergen County)
- Doug Marlette, Tulsa World
- Marguerite Martyn, St. Louis Post-Dispatch
- Bill Mauldin, St. Louis Post-Dispatch
- Glenn McCoy, Belleville News-Democrat
- John Tinney McCutcheon, Chicago Tribune
- Shaw McCutcheon, Spokesman-Review
- Wiley Miller
- Jim Morin, Miami Herald
- Thomas Nast
- Neal Obermeyer, San Diego Reader, Lincoln Journal Star, The Reader
- Jack Ohman, The Sacramento Bee
- Pat Oliphant, Universal Press Syndicate
- Carey Orr, Chicago Tribune
- Ray Osrin, The Plain Dealer
- Paul Palnik
- Jeff Parker, Florida Today
- Walt Partymiller
- Mike Peters, Dayton Daily News
- Joel Pett, Lexington Herald-Leader & Tribune Content Agency
- John Pierotti
- Ted Rall, Universal Press Syndicate
- Michael Ramirez, Investor's Business Daily
- Mikhaela Reid
- Steve Sack, Minneapolis Star Tribune
- Ben Sargent, Austin American-Statesman
- Bill Schorr, United Media, United Features Syndicate
- Dr. Seuss (Theodor Seuss Geisel)
- Drew Sheneman, Tribune Content Agency
- Jen Sorensen
- Lee W. Stanley
- Scott Stantis, Chicago Tribune & Tribune Content Agency
- Wayne Stayskal, Tampa Tribune
- Ed Stein, Rocky Mountain News
- Ed Subitzky, New York Times
- Dana Summers, Tribune Content Agency
- Ann Telnaes, NYTS/CWS
- Tom Toles, Washington Post
- Tom Tomorrow (Dan Perkins), This Modern World
- Rob Tornoe
- J. P. Trostle, Herald-Sun (Durham, North Carolina)
- Unit (Cristian Fleming), The Brooklyn Paper
- Edmund S. Valtman, The Hartford Times
- Gary Varvel, Indianapolis Star
- Pete Wagner, (Minneapolis) City Pages, Minnesota Daily, Madison Press Connection, Hustler Magazine
- Dan Wasserman, Boston Globe & Tribune Content Agency
- Emil Weiss
- Shan Wells, Huffington Post, Artizans, Cartoon Movement, Durango Telegraph
- Charles Werner, Indianapolis Star
- Signe Wilkinson, Philadelphia Daily News
- Clint C. Wilson, Sr.
- Monte Wolverton, Cagle Cartoons
- Don Wright, Palm Beach Post
- Larry Wright, Detroit News
- Matt Wuerker, Politico
- Adam Zyglis, Buffalo News

== See also ==
- Editorial cartoon
- Editorial cartoonist
- List of caricaturists
- List of cartoonists
