= Schrunk =

Schrunk is a surname of German origin, possibly a variant of the surname Schrank, a topographic surname for someone who lived by a gate or fence. Notable people with the surname include:

- Mike Schrunk (born 1942), American district attorney
- Terry Schrunk (1913-1975), American politician

== See also ==
- Schrunk Township, Burleigh County, North Dakota, a township in North Dakota
- Terry Schrunk Plaza, a park in Portland, Oregon
- Schrank
