= Khaldoon =

Khaldoon, Khaldoun, or Khaldun (Arabic: خلدون) is an Arabic masculine given name and surname. Notable people with the name include:

== Given name ==
- Khal Asfour, Australian politician and mayor
- Khaldoon Majid Abdullah (born 1963), Iraqi-Australian Mandaean priest
- Khaldoon Gharaibeh (born 1968), Jordanian cartoonist
- Khaldoon Al Mubarak (born 1976), Emirati businessman
- Khaldoon Sabra (born 2004), Jordanian footballer
- Khaldoun Baghdadi (born 1973), Palestinian-American attorney
- Khaldoun Ibrahim (born 1987), Iraqi footballer
- Khaldoun Al-Khashti (born 1970), Kuwaiti handball player
- Khaldoun Al-Khawaldeh (born 1991), Jordanian footballer
- Khaldoun Al-Khuzami (born 1990), Jordanian footballer
- Khaldoun Moussa (born 1999), Qatari footballer
- Khaldoun Al Tabari (born 1950), Jordanian businessman
- Khaldoun Talhouni, Jordanian diplomat

== Surname ==
- Ibn Khaldun (1332–1406), Tunisian historian and philosopher
