= Norkin =

Norkin (Russian: Норкин) is a Russian and Jewish masculine surname, its feminine counterpart is Norkina. The surname may refer to the following notable people:

- Amikam Norkin (born 1966), commander of the Israeli Air Force
- Sam Norkin (1917–2011), American cartoonist
