= Stewart McCrae =

Stewart McCrae may refer to:

- Stewart McCrae (cartoonist)
- Stewart McCrae (politician)
