= The Gefilte Manifesto =

2016 cookbook by Jeffrey Yoskowitz and Liz Alpern

The Gefilte Manifesto: New Recipes for Old World Jewish Foods.
- Author: Jeffrey Yoskowitz and Liz Alpern
- Language: English
- Genre: cookbook, Jewish cuisine
- Published: 2016
- Publisher: Flatiron Books
- Publication place: United States
- ISBN: 978-1-250-07138-5

The Gefilte Manifesto: New Recipes for Old World Jewish Foods is a "narrative cookbook" written by Jeffrey Yoskowitz and Liz Alpern, and published by Flatiron Books in 2016. It is primarily a cookbook which attempts to modernize Ashkenazic Jewish cuisine. The book contains 98 recipes.

== Background ==
The Gefilte Manifesto draws its namesake from the mission statement of The Gefilteria, the business owned and operated by the authors. The word 'gefilte' is Yiddish for 'stuffed', and references gefilte fish, an Ashkenazi delicacy which is unpopular among American Jews.

The book, and the recipes and discussions it contains, are expressly a rejection of mass-produced Jewish food, and the stigma which has come with it. Yoskowitz, who wrote his college thesis on the kosher food industry, has even called the kosher aisle at grocery stores "the place where Jewish food goes to die", and in The Gefilte Manifesto, he and Alpern attempt to make Jewish Cuisine accessible to home cooks without sacrificing convenience.

The publishing of The Gefilte Manifesto coincides and contributes to what The New York Times called a "Golden Age" of American Jewish food, and in an interview with Joel Rose on National Public Radio, Yoskowitz stated that his and Alpern's mission was to "revitalize [Ashkenazi Jewish] cuisine".

== Reception ==
The Gefilte Manifesto has been featured in numerous publications and media outlets, including The New Yorker, The Atlantic, National Public Radio, Forward, and +972. USA Today named The Gefilte Manifesto one of the top 16 food and beverage books of 2016. The Jewish Book Council named it a finalist for the National Jewish Book Award in Contemporary Jewish Life and Practice.

Reviews have been positive. In J. The Jewish News of Northern California, Howard Freedman said of the book: "The emphasis is not on reproducing the foods of the shtetl. Rather, the thrust is on developing an appreciation of the foods and of the spirit of those who cooked them". Paula Forbes wrote in Epicurious: "There are... modern updates on classic flavors... So whether you're looking to preserve your own Jewish traditions or are simply a fan of borscht, this is the book for you". Bari Weiss, of The Wall Street Journal, said on NY1's The Book Reader: "Alpern and Yoskowitz recover and reinvent Eastern European Jewish classics and add a bunch of recipes that likely would have baffled their great-grandparents". Publishers Weekly, however, writes: "Some readers will be disappointed that Alpern and Yoskowitz, purveyors of a pop-up dining service called the Gefilteria, provide exactly three gefilte fish recipes", though it goes on to say: "The authors have actually dug deeper than the title implies, providing a comprehensive and joyful survey of Eastern European Jewish cuisine".
