= Haldun =

- Pronunciation: Turkish: [haɫˈdun]
- Gender: Male
- Language: Turkish

Origin
- Meaning: Immortal

Other names
- Alternative spelling: Chaldun
- Variant form: Khaldoon (Arabic)

Haldun is a masculine given name of Turkish origin. Notable people with the name include:

== Given name ==
- Haldun Alagaş (born 1970), Turkish world and European champion karateka
- Haldun Boysan (1958–2020), Turkish actor
- Haldun Dormen (1928–2026), Turkish actor
- Haldun Efemgil (born 1966), Turkish judoka
- Haldun Ozaktas, Turkish electrical engineer
- Haldun Taner (1915–1986), Turkish playwright

== See also ==
- Khaldoon, Arabic spelling of the name
