= Ken Fallin =

American cartoonist (born 1948)

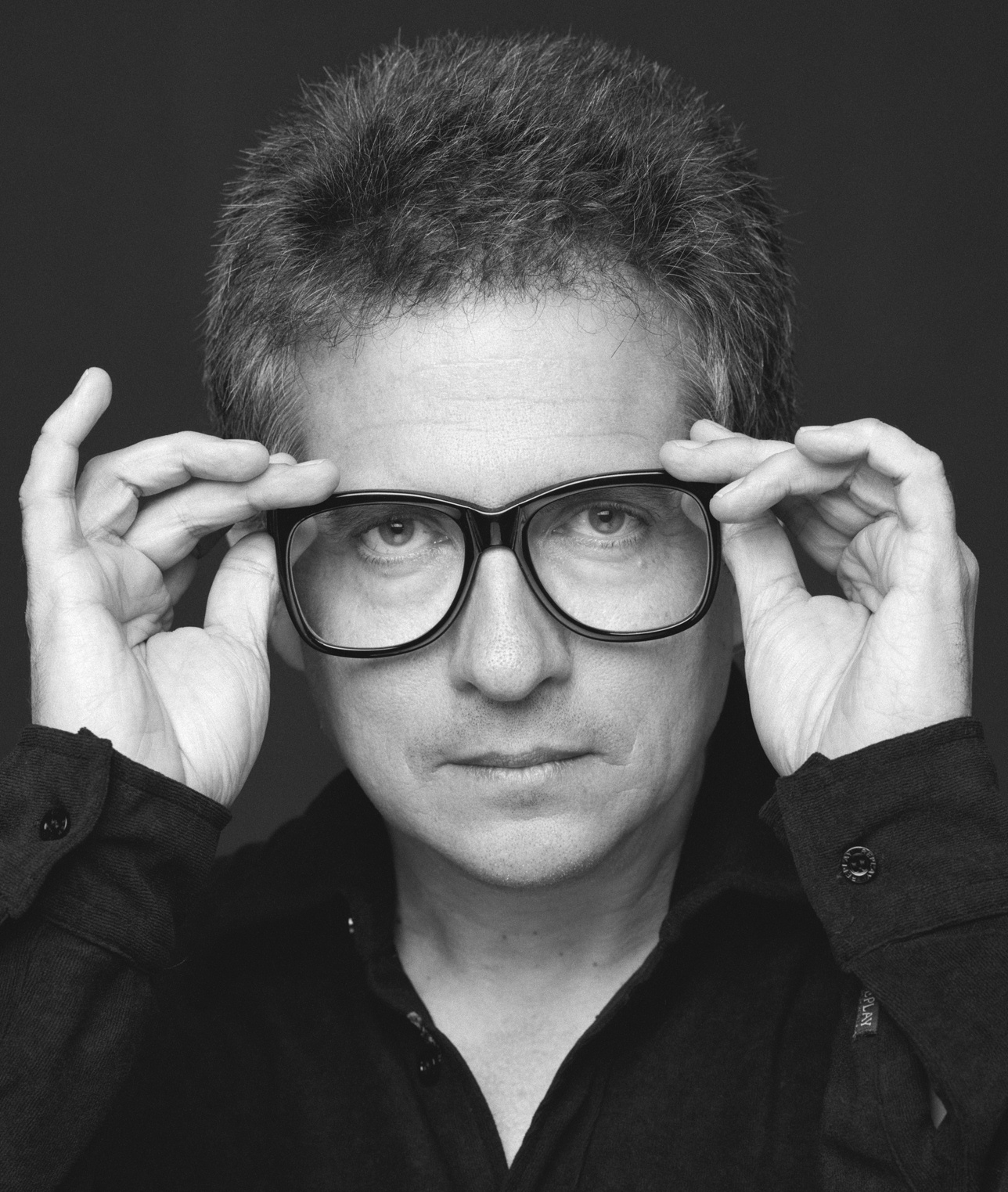
- Ken Fallin
- Born: Kenneth Aubrey Fallin; November 11, 1948; Jacksonville, Florida, US
- Education: Art Institute of Boston, Parsons School of Design
- Known for: Illustrator, caricaturist

Ken Fallin (born November 11, 1948, in Jacksonville, Florida) is an American illustrator and caricaturist. His first big break was in 1983 doing the posters and advertising for the popular satirical revue Forbidden Broadway. In 1987, he was commissioned by the Boston Herald to do a celebrity caricature every week in the Sunday arts and entertainment section.

Fallin has illustrated roughly 500 notable people for the Wall Street Journal, including President Barack Obama, Paul Newman and Tim Russert for Peggy Noonan's memorial of the newsman in the paper.

His Forbidden Broadway posters promoted the show in London, Tokyo and Sydney. Outside of entertainment, Fallin developed relationships with corporate clientele, particularly American Express, which engaged him on several national media campaigns as well as private work. Belvedere Vodka hired him to turn famous icons like the Playboy Bunny and Quentin Tarantino into bottles of the alcohol. Other clients have included HBO, Showtime and Walt Disney Productions.

== Background ==
On November 11, 1948, Kenneth Aubrey Fallin was born to Velma and Aubrey Fallin. His mother taught elementary school and worked with special needs students. His father Aubrey enlisted as a Marine in World War II and fought on Iwo Jima; his later career was in veterinary medicine.

Fallin attended Robert E. Lee High School in Jacksonville and graduated from Emerson College in Boston, Massachusetts, in 1974.

Wanting to become an actor, Fallin moved to New York City, where he approached the writer of Forbidden Broadway about ideas for the show. From that initial meeting, Fallin's involvement with the show and the design of its poster art would last over twenty years.

He attended the Art Institute of Boston and Parsons School of Design, and studied drawing under famed cartoonist Mort Gerberg. He currently lives in New York City.

== Career ==
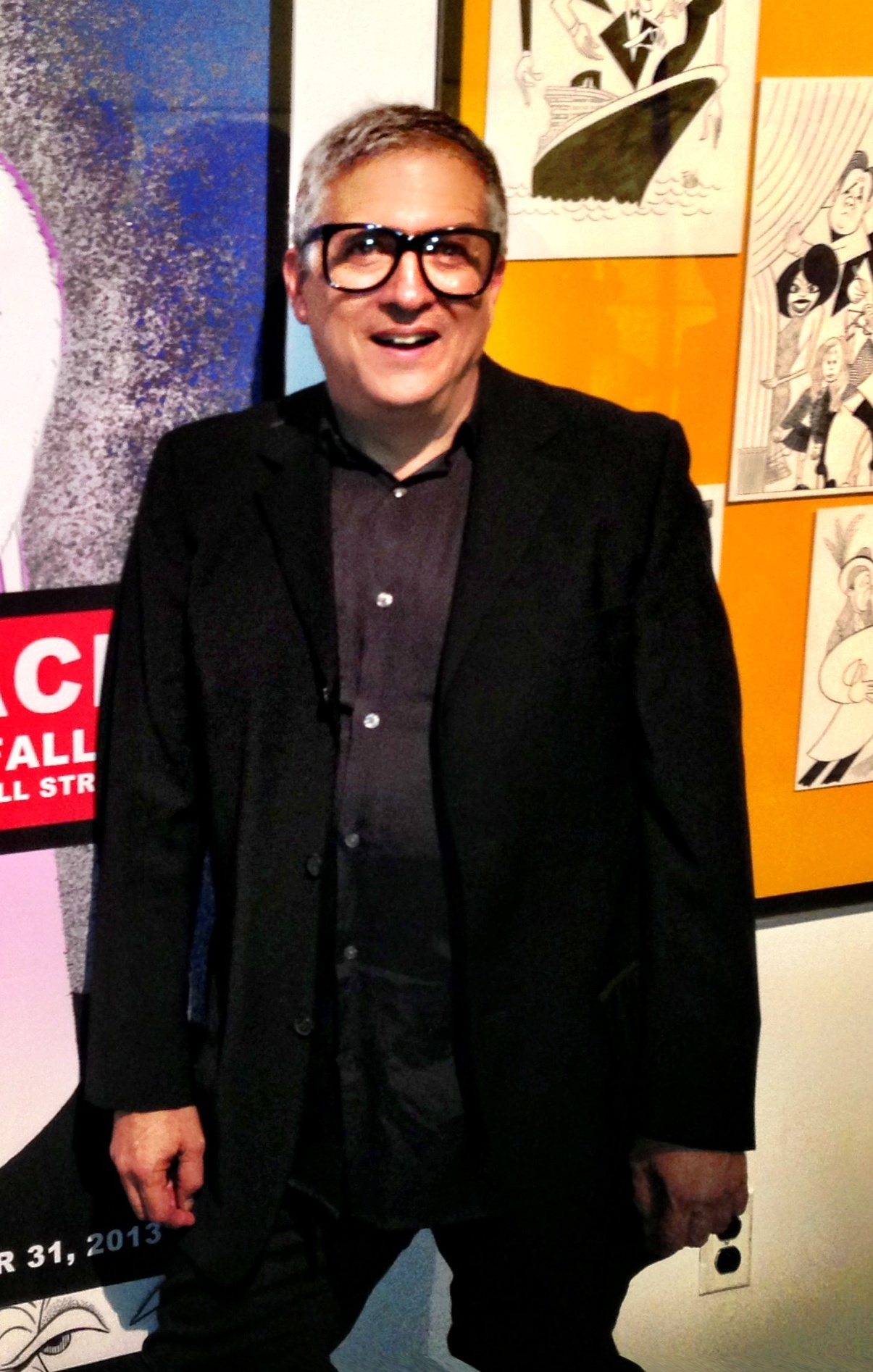
Fallin at the 2013 reception for the opening of his exhibition That Face at New World Stages Gallery

Fallin's career has spanned work in advertising, Broadway theatre, network television and, most notably, in print for publications such as InStyle, the Boston Herald, and the Wall Street Journal. He considers legendary caricaturist Al Hirschfeld as a major influence, and mimicked his style early in his career for the Forbidden Broadway work. Other influences include the German "degenerate" portrait artists of the 1920s, Aubrey Beardsley, Frank Gehry, Eero Saarinen, Richard Avedon, Irving Penn, and Dame Edna Everage.

=== Broadway ===
Forbidden Broadway is a show that satirizes musical theatre, and caricaturist Al Hirschfeld’s work defined that genre early on. The producers of the show wanted Fallin's posters to resemble Hirschfeld's style to spoof his famous pen and ink drawings.

The show's success meant Fallin's work was shown in London, Los Angeles, Tokyo, and Sydney. In 2009, Fallin completed work on the third London revival of "Forbidden Broadway", as well as illustrations for a new book on the lyrics from the show.

In 2006, Fallin presented Tony Award–winning costume designer Alvin Colt with a portrait on his 90th birthday.

Broadwayworld.com announced in September 2009 that Fallin would contribute to the site a sketch of a musical theater star each week.

As of 2014, Fallin had contributed the artwork for eight of the twelve Forbidden Broadway compact disc covers.

=== Print ===
From 1987 to the mid 1990s, Fallin illustrated the cover of the Boston Herald's Sunday arts section, creating clever caricatures of the leading movie, TV, theater, and pop music stars on the day. In 1994, he began doing illustrations of sports figures for the Wall Street Journal, which led to him doing the 1994 Winter Olympics for the paper. He was subsequently asked to submit caricatures for the lifestyle and business sections. After he submitted an unsolicited portrait of the recently deceased Douglas Fairbanks, Jr., he began work drawing famous citizens for their obituaries.

=== Television ===
Fallin has done caricatures for Showtime and CNBC.

=== Corporate ===
Fallin was first hired by American Express to sketch all of the company's vice presidents, which were to be projected behind them at a corporate banquet. The relationship with the credit card company continued when in 1990 they commissioned Fallin for several nationwide print ad campaigns in the United States. One included Amex's salute to famous restaurants and chefs, whom he illustrated. For another corporate client, he turned the Playboy bunny, Quentin Tarantino, and the U.S. World Poker Tour champions into bottles of Belvedere Vodka. Other corporate work has included Hong Kong Disneyland and BMG Records.

== See also ==
- List of caricaturists
