= Gogu =

Gogu is a Romanian given name and a Telugu surname. Notable people with this name include:

== Given name ==
- Gogu Constantinescu (1881–1965), a Romanian scientist, engineer, and inventor
- Gogu Neagoe, a Romanian cartoonist
- Gogu Rădulescu (1914–1991), a Romanian communist politician and economist
- Gogu Tonca (1947–2010), a Romanian football player

== Surname ==
- Gogu Shyamala (born 1969), an Indian writer
