= Oscar Berger =

Oscar Berger may refer to:

- Óscar Berger (born 1946), President of Guatemala
- Oscar Berger (cartoonist) (1901–1977), caricaturist and cartoonist born in Czechoslovakia
- Oscar Berger-Levrault (1826–1903), French inventor
