= Jonathan Pugh =

English cartoonist

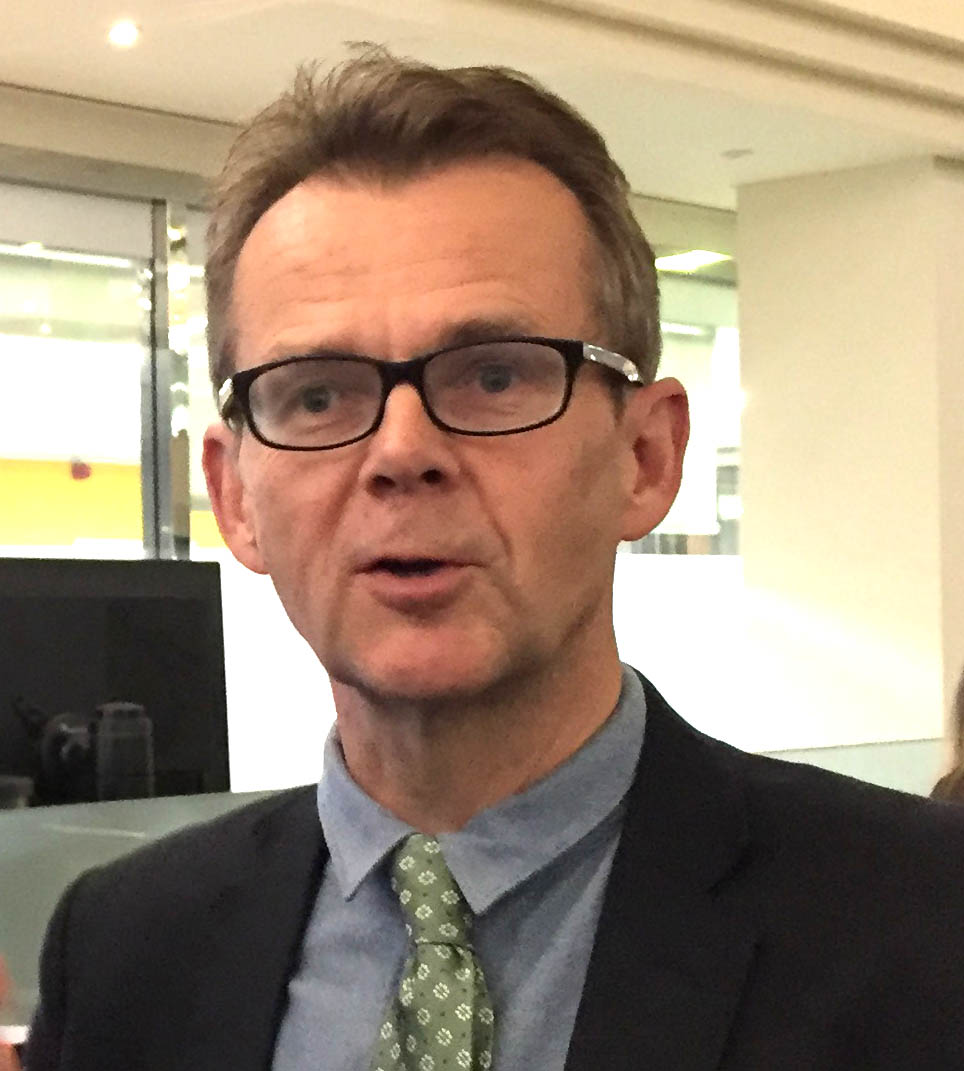
Jonathan Pugh, British cartoonist

Jonathan Pugh (born 1962) is an English cartoonist who has contributed to many United Kingdom national newspapers and magazines.

== Early life ==
Pugh was born in Worcester, England. He was educated at Whitford Hall in Bromsgrove (Worcestershire), the Dragon School in Oxford, and Downside School near Bath (Somerset). He studied law at Oxford Polytechnic (now Oxford Brookes University).

== Work ==
Pugh has been the pocket cartoonist for The Times. He has also worked for The Guardian, The Independent, The Observer, Punch, Private Eye, The Spectator, Country Life, and The Tablet. His work covers editorial and topical subject matter, including political and social comment. His cartoons include gag cartoons and comic strips. He has also undertaken book illustration and advertising work. In January 2010, Pugh became the pocket cartoonist for the Daily Mail.

== Books ==
- Howard, Philip, and Pugh, Jonathan, The Times Quotes of the Week. HarperCollins UK, 2002. ISBN 978-0-00-712750-4.
- Pugh, Jonathan, Best of Pugh. Virgin Paperbacks, 2007. ISBN 978-0-7535-1371-2.

== See also ==
- List of editorial cartoonists
