= George Wachsteter =

American cartoonist

- Born: George Wachsteter; 1911
- Died: 2004 (aged 92–93)
- Known for: Painting, Drawing

George Wachsteter (1911–2004) was an American illustrator and caricaturist. He drew extensively from 1937 to 1967 for the New York Times, the New York Herald, the New York Journal American, the New York World-Telegram, and for the NBC, ABC, and CBS radio and television networks. A gradual loss of his vision ended his drawing career prematurely in the late 1960s. He died in 2004. Next to Al Hirschfeld, he was one of the most visible American theatrical caricaturists working during the 1940s and 1950s.

== See also ==
- List of caricaturists
