= Robert Lassalvy =

French cartoonist, caricaturist and painter

- Born: Robert Lassalvy; 22 April 1932 Cournonterral, France
- Died: March 31, 2001 (aged 68) Montpellier, France
- Areas: Cartoonist, Writer, Penciller, Artist, Inker, Publisher, Letterer
- Notable works: Les meilleurs dessins de Lui

Robert Lassalvy (1932-2001) was a French editorial cartoonist, caricaturist and painter born in Cournonterral (Hérault).

Known for his saucy humor and ultra sexy pin-ups, his caricatures are mainly related to human sexuality.

From "Ici Paris" to "Playboy", from "Lui" to "La Vie Catholique", his cartoons have been published in the French and international press for over 50 years.

As of 1997, he also made many paintings from cubism genre.

Considered as one of the great cartoonists of his generation, he was appointed knight of Arts and Letters on January 1, 2000.

In January 2020, a covered market bearing his name is inaugurated in his native village, Cournonterral.
