= Glynis Sweeny =

American illustrator and caricaturist (born 1962)

Ms. Caveman, by Sweeny

Glynis Sweeny (born 1962) is an American illustrator and caricaturist who is known for lampooning political and business figures in newspapers, newsweeklies, and consumer magazines.

Sweeny graduated with a degree in graphic design from Rochester Institute of Technology. She later honed her illustrating skills under the direction of the iconic Alan E. Cober at University at Buffalo, The State University of New York.

Soon after, Sweeny became a staff designer and illustrator for The Detroit News, working alongside other notable illustrators like Don Asmussen. During this time, Sweeny developed as a caricaturist, and received national recognition; an original illustration of musician Paul Simon is now part of a Library of Congress collection. While at the News, Sweeny began to attract a long roster of clients, including Rolling Stone, GQ and Entertainment Weekly.

In 1995, Sweeny left the paper and moved to New York City to focus on her publishing clients in the area. Her client roster also includes Time magazine, The Wall Street Journal, Business Week, The Village Voice, The New York Times, TV Guide, Comedy Central, The Atlantic, Fortune, the Los Angeles Times, and The Boston Globe. She also illustrated the cover for the book, "The Hammer Comes Down," a biography of Tom DeLay.

Wax-based colored pencil is Sweeny's medium of choice and she uses a unique burnishing technique for her illustrations to create color depth. Increasingly her works contain a mixture of pencil illustration and computer-based illustration. Sweeny's more recent work is notably less commercial and more introspective, esoteric and sublime. She has two recurrent themes that now dominate their work: windows into her subjects' torso that can reveal various types of hardware, and complex doodles, called "Brain Clouds," that reveal patchworks of seemingly random thoughts and images hovering above human busts.

Sweeny has appeared in the Society of Illustrators, RSVP, American Illustration, and Communication Arts juried annuals and has won illustration awards from the Society of Newspaper Design and the Society of Professional Journalists. In 2008, she appeared in a group gallery show at the Rockland Center for the Arts called "Seven: Out of This World." In 2011, Sweeny was among several artists chosen to reinterpret the art of Edward Hopper for a gallery show at the Edward Hopper House Art Center in celebration of the museum's 40th anniversary. Her illustration, entitled Blue, recast the famous Parisian bistro scene in Hopper's Soir Bleu.

Sweeny resides in Nyack, NY.
