= Schrank =

The surname Schrank is an occupational surname of Germanic descent (old high German: scranc). The name origins from the word "Schranke", which old meaning is "fence". The word Schrank loosely translates to "cabinet" (e.g. Kühlschrank, compound word meaning "cold-cabinet", i.e. refrigerator) or "closet" (e.g. Wäscheschrank or linen-closet). Schränk also translates to "saw". The name "Schrank" may refer to

- Franz von Paula Schrank (1747–1835), German botanist and entomologist
- John Schrank (1876–1943), failed American assassin
- Max-Günther Schrank (1898-1960), German lieutenant general
- Peter Schrank (born 1952), cartoonist
