= Steiber Township, North Dakota =

- Township
- Location within North Dakota
- Coordinates: 47°17′50″N 100°33′32″W
- Country: United States
- State: North Dakota
- County: Burleigh
- Consolidated: April 20, 2022

Area
  - Total: 34.37 sq mi (89.02 km^{2})
  - Land: 34.27 sq mi (88.75 km^{2})
  - Water: 0.10 sq mi (0.27 km^{2})
- Elevation: 1,896 ft (578 m)

Population (2020)
  - Total: 9
  - Density: 0.26/sq mi (0.10/km^{2})
- Time zone: UTC-6 (Central (CST))
  - Summer (DST): UTC-5 (CDT)
- ZIP code: 58477 (Regan)
- Area code: 701
- FIPS code: 38-75820
- GNIS feature ID: 1037141

Steiber Township was a township in Burleigh County, North Dakota, United States. The population was 9 at the 2020 census.

On April 20, 2022, Schrunk Township was merged with Schrunk Township to form Schrunk-Steiber Township.

== Geography ==
Steiber Township has a total area of 34.370 square miles (89.02 km^{2}), of which 34.267 square miles (88.75 km^{2}) is land and 0.103 square miles (0.27 km^{2}) is water.
