= Cournonterral =

- Commune
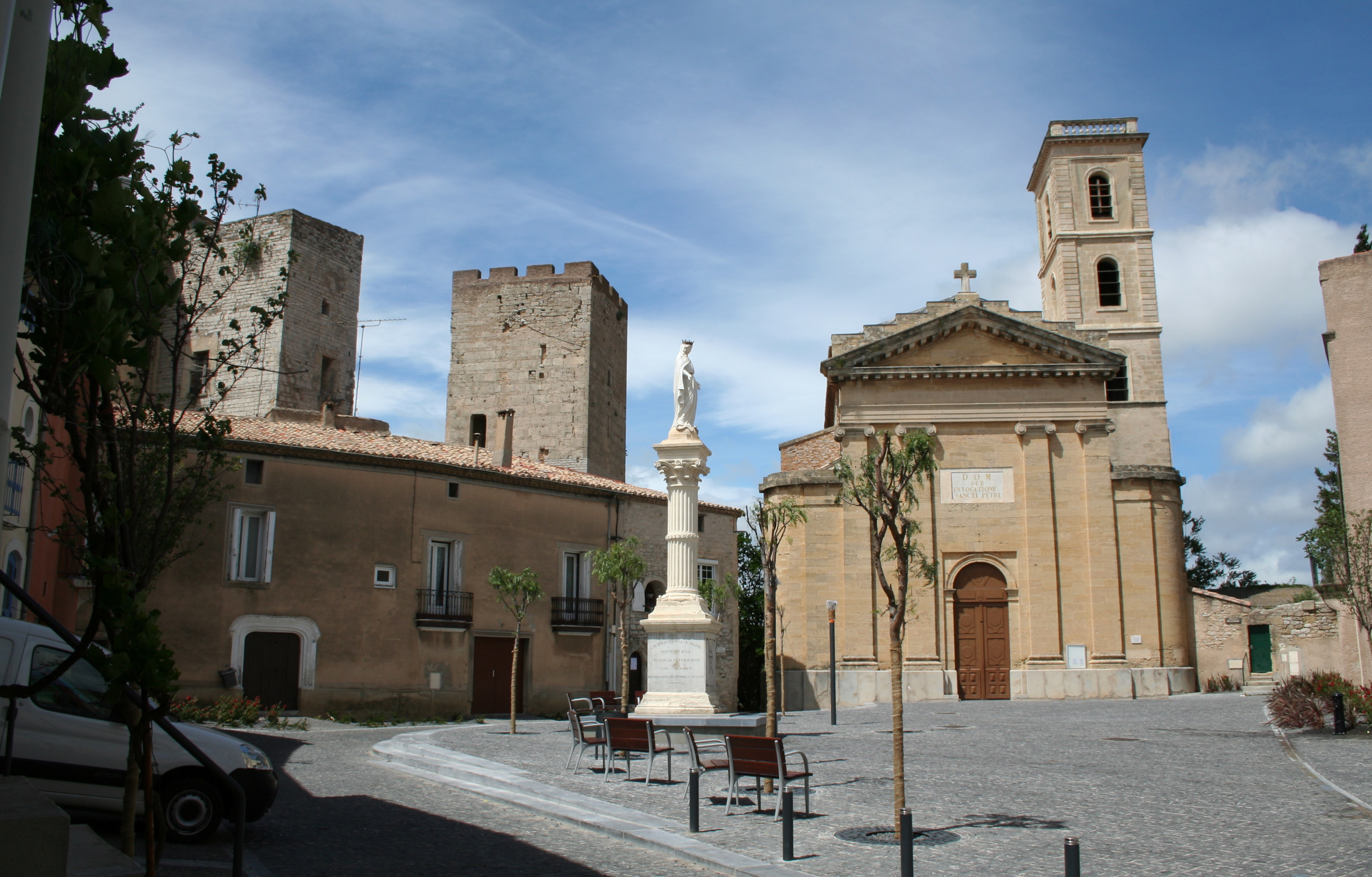
- Tower and Sainte-Croix church

- Coat of arms
- Location of Cournonterral
- Location within France Location within Occitanie
- Coordinates: 43°33′32″N 3°43′12″E
- Country: France
- Region: Occitania
- Department: Hérault
- Arrondissement: Montpellier
- Canton: Pignan
- Intercommunality: Montpellier Méditerranée Métropole

Government
  - Mayor (2020–2026): William Ars
- Area^{1}: 28.62 km^{2} (11.05 sq mi)
- Highest elevation: 320 m (1,050 ft)
- Lowest elevation: 29 m (95 ft)
- Population (2023): 7,359
  - Density: 257.1/km^{2} (666.0/sq mi)
- Demonym: Cournonterralais
- Time zone: UTC+01:00 (CET)
  - Summer (DST): UTC+02:00 (CEST)
- INSEE/Postal code: 34088 /34660
- ^{1} French Land Register data, which excludes lakes, ponds, glaciers > 1 km^{2} (0.386 sq mi or 247 acres) and river estuaries.

Cournonterral (French pronunciation: [kuʁnɔ̃tɛʁal]; Occitan: Cornonterralh) is a commune in the Hérault department in southern France.

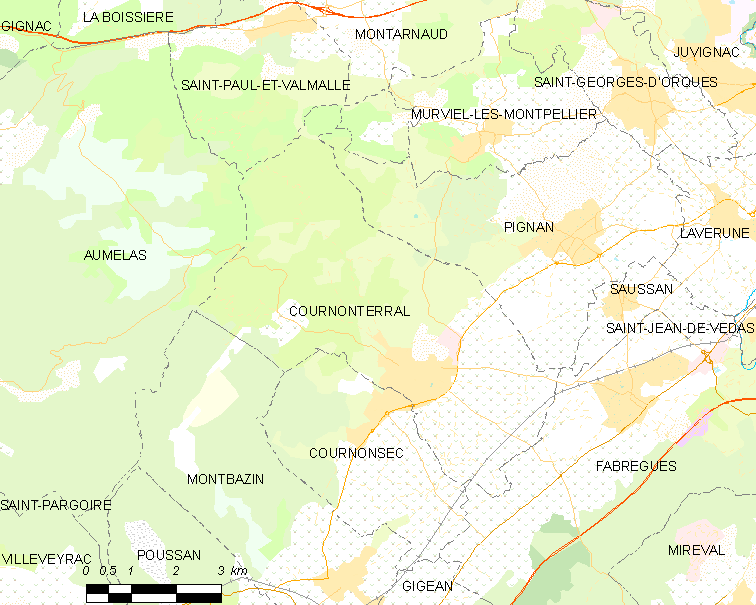
Map

== Population ==
Residents are known as Cournonterralais in French.

Historical population
Year	Pop.	±% p.a.
1968	2,088	—
1975	2,460	+2.37%
1982	3,062	+3.18%
1990	4,095	+3.70%
1999	5,069	+2.40%
2007	5,586	+1.22%
2012	5,859	+0.96%
2017	6,110	+0.84%
2023	7,359	+3.15%
Source: INSEE

== Festival ==
The town is known for an annual festival known as Pailhasses. The festival has taken place in Cournonterral every Ash Wednesday since 1346. In that year, residents held off rivals from their neighbouring village of Aumelas, thus putting an end to a long dispute over gathering firewood. Since that time, Cournonterral residents have relived the event every year. The Paillasses (people in straw-stuffed tops) chase the "white men" through the streets of the town with old rags and tissue soaked in wine sediment.

A fictionalized version of the Pailhasses is presented in Agnès Varda's film "Vagabond".

== Notable people from Cournonterral ==
- Robert Lassalvy, editorial cartoonist
- Cédric Cambon, professional footballer

== See also ==
- Communes of the Hérault department
