= Barry Hunau =

American cartoonist

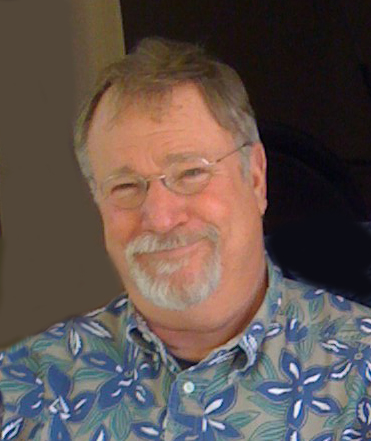
- Area: Cartoonist

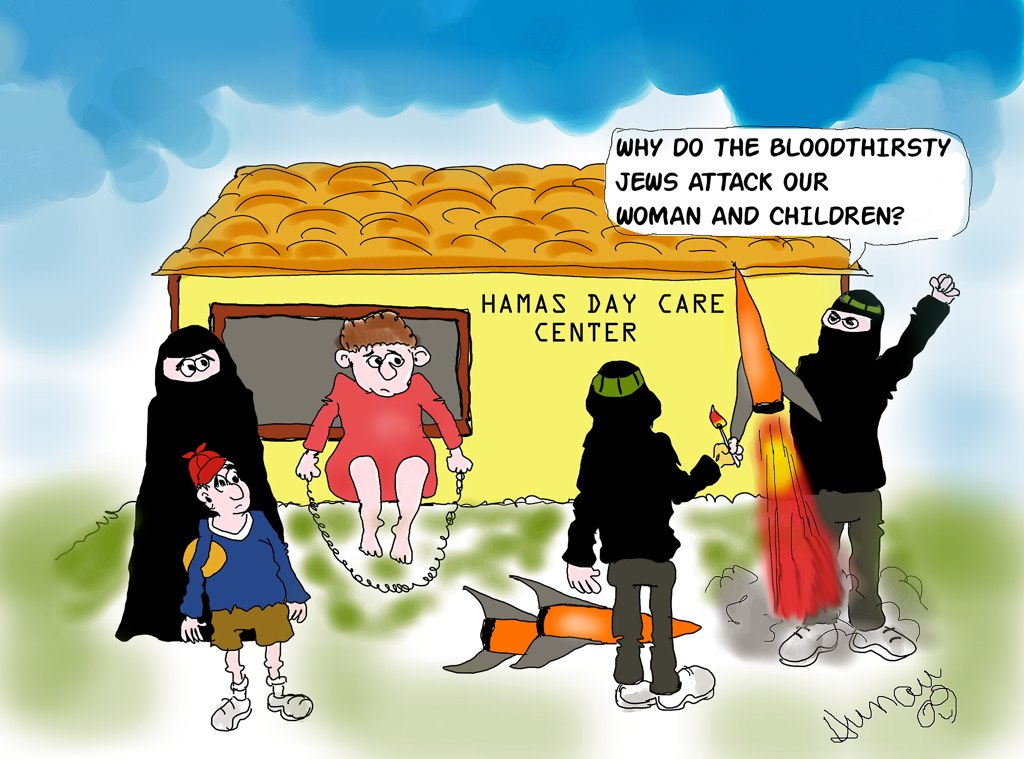
A cartoon by Hunau titled Hamas Day Care Center

Barry Hunau is an American cartoonist whose cartoons appear weekly in J. The Jewish News of Northern California, and several times a week in The Jerusalem Post. His work has also been published in the San Francisco Chronicle, The Berkeley Daily Planet, the Algemeiner Journal and others. His cartoons have been chosen three times for inclusion in Pelican Press's "Best Editorial Cartoons of The Year". They have also appeared in "The Best Editorial Cartoons of Campaign 2008".

His cartoons were published in Best Editorial Cartoons of the Year: 2010 Edition By Charles Brooks

In 2009, his cartoons were used to illustrate the OnStage Pleasant Hill Theatre show "Above the Violet". Hunau contributes work for Sunshine Week, a national initiative by the American Society of News Editors intended to educate the public about the importance of open government and the dangers of excessive and unnecessary secrecy.

Hunau provided illustrations for "Treat Your Spouse Like a Dog", a book on relationships by psychologist Margie Ryerson.

He is a member of Association of American Editorial Cartoonists. He tries to avoid anger and ad hominem attacks in his cartoons.

== Personal life ==
Hunau is a retired dentist. He is married, has two children and has lived in Lafayette, California since 1971.
