= Seyran Caferli =

Azerbaijani cartoonist

- Seyran Caferli at Ayyacc International Summit, China
- Born: Seyran Nasirov; 1966 (age 59–60); Imishli
- Known for: Painting, Drawing

Seyran Caferli (Russian: Сейран Джаферли; March 8, 1966) is an Azerbaijani cartoonist. Over 700 of his cartoons have been printed in many albums and displayed at international exhibitions and competitions.

== Early life ==
Caferli was born in Imishli on March 8, 1966, as Seyran Nasirov. While he lived a hard life, he moved to Baku and began to express his emotions through caricatures.

== Career ==
In 2002, the first "Cartoonists Union of Azerbaijan" was established, and till 2006, he worked as president of this organization. His first cartoon was printed in the comic magazine KIRPI in 1982. He graduated from the Journalistic Art Institute in 1992. He was the organizer of the international cartoonist competition "Molla Nasreddin" which was the first competition in Azerbaijan history and continued for four years. Caferli also organized the "Smiling Cat" International Cartoon Competitions. Now he is the director of the First International Cartoon News Center "CNC" website and is the chief editor of the international cartoon magazine Humor.

He is also the Azerbaijan editor of the WITTY WORLD international cartoon magazine, published in the United States. He is a member of the board of FICWS (Federation of International Cartoon Web Sites) and vice-president of FICA (Federation of International Cartoon & Animation). He is a board member of the International Cartoon Committee. Caferli was part of the juries for more than 20 international cartoon competitions. Two of his cartoons were included in the permanent exhibits of Italian and Austria cartoon museums. He opened individual exhibitions in Iran (2003), in Turkey (2011), and in France (2012).

He is the head of Azerbaijan's representation in the World Cartoonists union.

Two of his cartoons were selected for a permanent exhibit in the Mercedes Benz headquarters. One of his works was selected at the 'Biennale Internazionale dell'Umorismo nell'arte' cartoon contest and kept in a museum in Tolentino, Italy.

A book of his cartoons was published in Kruishoutem, Belgium, by ECC (European Cartoon Center).

== Family ==
Seyran Caferli married and had one son, Ibrahim Nasirli, a DJ and record producer known as Austin Blake (Part of BakuBoy & Austin Blake).

== See also ==
- List of caricaturists
