= Schrunk-Steiber Township, North Dakota =

- Township
- Location within North Dakota
- Coordinates: 47°17′15″N 100°29′41″W
- Country: United States
- State: North Dakota
- County: Burleigh

Area
  - Total: 68.79 sq mi (178.17 km^{2})
  - Land: 66.97 sq mi (173.44 km^{2})
  - Water: 1.83 sq mi (4.73 km^{2})
- Elevation: 1,896 ft (578 m)
- Time zone: UTC-6 (Central (CST))
  - Summer (DST): UTC-5 (CDT)
- Area code: 701
- FIPS code: 38-71223
- GNIS feature ID: 2831300

Schrunk-Steiber Township is a township in Burleigh County, North Dakota, United States.

It was created from a merger of Schrunk and Steiber townships in 2022.

== Geography ==
Schrunk-Steiber Township has a total area of 68.790 square miles (178.17 km^{2}), of which 66.964 square miles (173.44 km^{2}) is land and 1.826 square miles (4.73 km^{2}) is water.
