= Wolo =

American artist and puppeteer

- Artist Wolo with puppet
- Born: Baron Wolf Erhardt Anton Georg Trutzschler; July 4, 1902; Berlin, Germany
- Died: May 8, 1989 (aged 86); San Francisco, California
- Known for: Art: caricatures, murals, puppet shows, children's books
- Notable work: Five children's books: Amanda; The Secret Of The Ancient Oak; Tweedles Be Brave; Sir Archibald; Friendship Valley

Wolo (1902–1989) was an artist, caricaturist, muralist, puppeteer, and children's book author. He emigrated from Europe to the United States after World War I, and after six years doing odd jobs, pursued a career in art over the next sixty years. He began exhibiting his art in Chicago, Los Angeles, and then in San Francisco, where he drew a daily caricature column, "I Saw You", for the San Francisco Chronicle. He painted murals at hospital wards and at restaurants, wrote five children's books, and was a puppeteer for children's parties as well as on television station KPIX 5.

== Early life and education ==
Ehrhardt Anton Wolff Georg Trützschler Von Falkenstein was born July 4, 1902, in Berlin, Germany. His parents, of the noble class, were Baron Ludwig Ullrich Martin Fritz Trützschler Von Falkenstein, and Caroline Margarethe Charlotte Ida Anna (née Von Nettelbladt) Trützschler Von Falkenstein. His name "Wolo" came from his younger sister Anneliese, who as a two-year-old was not able to pronounce "Wolff", and when he became an artist, Wolo was the name he chose to use.

Wolo's father was a Lieutenant in the Alexander Grenadier Guards. When his parents divorced, his mother married a diplomat attached to the embassy at Berne, Switzerland, where Wolo lived until the age of 12. Under German law, his father took custody then, and enrolled his son in the Royal Military Academy in Germany. Following World War I, Wolo was sent first to a business college, then to "a famous Swiss Agricultural College" where he graduated as an "agricultural engineer".

On a 1922 student exchange in the United States at the University of Wisconsin, Wolo worked on a model farm near Beloit, tending dairy cattle. His wages were $10 per month, and he wrote, "I had never really wanted to be a farmer— I wanted to be an artist!" There followed a time he called, "the long, dark tunnel... This heart-breaking fight to become an artist—this terrific struggle". In his autobiographical statement in 1934, he listed six years of odd jobs: "grocery clerk—private secretary and switchboard operator... salesman... real estate... stock boy at Marshall Field's... linoleum cutter... pot washer, soda jerker... bus boy... handyman fence-fixer... Flapjack Juggler and Pantryman... worker in a candy factory... sign painter... and finally I became a janitor..."

Wolo's daughter wrote:

He was always interested in finding out things he didn't already know. Some subjects he adored were music, history, art of any kind of course, current events, clothing design, cuisine, ethnic cultures and travel, cars, and motorcycles, royalty, biographies of all kinds, ideologies and counter-cultures, religions of all kinds, medicine and anatomy, photography, nature, geography, biology... I think this gives you a good idea of what kind of man Papa appeared on the surface to be. Underneath he was a depressed very insecure frustrated child, he told me this himself. He covered these weaknesses well, but had powerful emotions and opinions underneath he revealed in his letters to me, and to his mother and sisters also. I never saw him come close to losing his temper or even saying anything unkind to or about anyone; although he came close in telling the truth about his first marriage. He tried suicide twice.

— Jean von Trutzschler

== Career ==
Wolo began his career as an artist in Chicago by sketching people in cabarets, then sold sketches to magazines and newspapers, before finally opening his own studio on Olvera Street in Los Angeles in 1927. In that studio, ventriloquist Edgar Bergen paid him $5 to sketch "a stupid-looking hayseed", a drawing used to create Bergen's famous dummy, Mortimer Snerd.

=== Caricatures ===
In 1932 Wolo found work as a caricaturist-columnist at the San Francisco Chronicle. By 1933, he had exhibited "caricatures and character portraits" at Courvoisier galleries. Portraits on display included, "General Johnson, Ramsey McDonald, Mr. William Randolph Hearst and Isadore Gomez". Critic Ada Haifin wrote, "Wolo's so-called caricatures of famous on exhibition at Courvoisier's might better be called 'exaggerated portraits.' There is a significant force and a penetrating quality, frequently soul-deep, in much of his work that bespeaks a future for this man if he should take up portrait as his special vocation."

In November 1933, Wolo began to sketch for "I Saw You", his daily caricature column at the San Francisco Chronicle, in which Wolo observed and sketched a person on the streets of San Francisco, without the "victim's knowledge". If a victim or his friends recognized him in Wolo's column, he could claim $1 at the Chronicle, after being identified by Wolo.

=== Drawings ===
Demonstrating he was more than a caricaturist, Wolo exhibited drawings in 1937 at the Gelber-Lilienthal Gallery, featuring sketches for murals he had created for children's rooms. Commenting on his murals, a critic wrote, "He is adroit; he has an affectionate sense of fun. His fanciful youngsters and animals are delightful."

Wolo also created sketches on the site of events such as the Open Air Art Show in San Francisco's Union Square.

=== Murals ===
In 1932, Wolo contributed to the Olvera Street mural, América Tropical.

Wolo's 80 animals in murals at the Stanford Convalescent Home for Children in Palo were described in 1938: "Merry animal murals... a picturesque new aid to the welfare of bay region youngsters".

Wolo's large murals were also on display at the Hippo Burger, New Pisa and Vesuvio restaurants, the Children's Hospital's Little Jim ward, and children's wards in Salinas and San Pablo.

=== Books ===
By 1940, Wolo's sketches and murals had come to the attention of the New York publishers at William Morrow and Company, who signed him to produce children's books. The characters were based on bedtime stories Wolo told his children, with an emphasis on fantasy.

- Amanda, New York: William Morrow and Company, 1941. "Amanda is a kind-hearted polka dot snake, who befriends all the jungle folk and was particularly beloved by Sir Archibald, the monkey. This is the story of their adventures in search of the blue lake where breadfruit grew buttered. Nonsense tale, with tropically gay splashy illustrations -- on every page. Jacket blurb in verse." —Kirkus Review
- The Secret Of The Ancient Oak, William Morrow and Company, New York, 1942. "The old oak had many tenants, an owl, squirrels, orioles, woodpeckers, raccoons, bees, and Ilgamoot, the ground-hog. A wicked black beaver lived nearby and decided that he would gnaw down the old tree and claim it for his own fell purposes. He came at night to accomplish his threat, but at first the occupants paid little attention. Then each group tried to keep him off, but it wasn't until they all learned to pull together that the old devil was thwarted." —Kirkus Review
- Tweedles Be Brave, Collins, London, 1943. "Tweedles is a daring small monkey with a white cockatoo playmate. What one doesn't see or do the other does. And they flout the spoiled, cantankerous king of the monkeys, and go far afield -- and find out a few things for themselves. Eventually, they save the monkey king and his subjects, and all live happily ever after. In story with lots of pictures."—Kirkus Review
- Sir Archibald, William Morrow and Company, New York, 1944. "Sir Archibald is the boastful monkey of previous books -- and this time he sets out to recover the king's crown from the dreaded Grizzlegrimm. The Meanies make it hard for him, but he has learned to use a charm which shows up fears as nothing -- and he comes through unscathed, only to find that Grizzlegrimm is a scarecrow! -- And the crown is home -- under the throne -- all the time. Typical Wolo pictures -- and lots of them."—Kirkus Review
- Friendship Valley, William Morrow & Company, New York, 1946. "This story has its own bit of social significance, dedicated as it is to the amity of nations. It is a story of the dispossessed, as a group of animals are burned out of their forest home and combine to find a new place to live. Fear and distrust are overcome and the animals find the path not too rugged after all. They settle down in a valley and learn to live together. Illustrated profusely in characteristic black and white and color." —Kirkus Review

Wolo also illustrated:

- Hippo Cook Book, by Jack Falvey. Nitty Gritty Productions, 1969.
- A Children's Music Box, Lyrics by Paul Francis Webster; Music by Frank E Churchill. William Morrow & Co, 1945.

=== Puppeteer ===
According to the San Francisco Bay Area Puppeteers Guild, where Wolo was a charter member in 1961, "KPIX 5 was a huge sponsor of puppetry. For Red Goose Shoes, Wolo Von Trutzler performed with his puppet friend Aloysius, and then went on to be featured with a spot on KPIX's Morning Show. Wolo...painted murals and acted as consultant for the construction of the Storybook Puppet Theater – Fairyland... Wolo won the Westinghouse Coast Network's competition and went to Hollywood to appear on the Panorama Pacific."

The digital library collection at the University of Southern California includes two images of "Wolo of the talking Hands," with this 1949 description of Wolo:

Famed puppeteer returns to Hollywood following a 10-month tour of Europe on which puppets were used on behalf of propaganda for the Allies and against their use by the Soviets. In Hollywood he is working at MGM on the new film Lili, starring Leslie Caron, Mel Ferrer, Jean Pierre Aumont and Zsa Zsa Gabor. The Technicolor romance is set against the background of a French carnival. Together with George Latshaw, Michael O'Rourke, Paul Walton, Wolo puts on a puppet show which forms the basis of the plot.

Wolo created puppets for the 1980 production of the musical Carnival! at the Mountain Play in Marin County California.

Wolo created all elements of his puppet shows:

The very essence of Wolo was his puppet shows! He himself created each of the puppets and stages he used... Wolo's puppet shows were a unique cross between a ventriloquist act and a puppet show. He'd quickly set up his colorful portable stage and stand to one side as a small puppet on his left hand appeared from behind the curtains. Of course, only Wolo was able to hear the little puppet's soft whisper and he'd translate the dialog to the audience... unscripted, every performance... was simple, colorful and woven with a happy spin of fantasy. With Wolo, what you saw is what you got!

— Erhardt G. von Trutzschler

== End of life ==
Wolo's career as an artist spanned 60 years. He died at age 86 in Laguna Honda Hospital in San Francisco.
