= Vyvyan Donner =

American caricaturist (1895–1965)

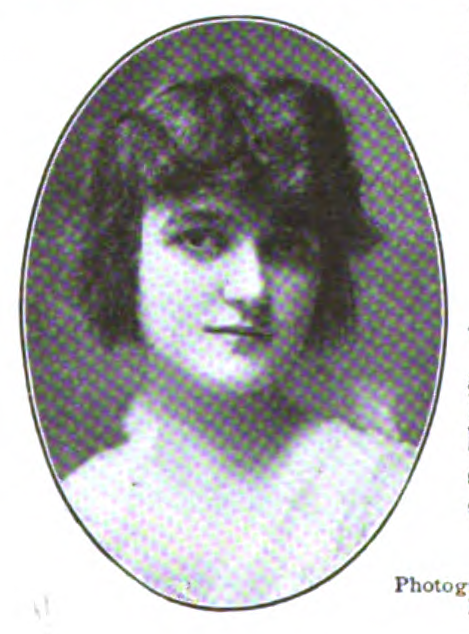
- Donner in 1916
- Born: Vyvyan Enid Donner; December 26, 1895; New York City, New York, U.S.
- Died: June 27, 1965 (aged 69); New York City, New York, U.S.
- Education: Cooper Union; Art Students' League

Vyvyan Enid Donner (December 26, 1895 – June 27, 1965) was an American fashion editor, film director, screenwriter, theatrical costume designer and caricaturist, perhaps best remembered for narrating numerous Movietone newsreels.

== Early life and career ==
On December 26, 1895, Vyvyan Enid Donner was born in New York City, the only child of Herman Montague and Emma Adelaide Donner (née Wilkins). Raised in Brooklyn, Donner attended St. Catherine's Hall and later Adelphi Academy before studying briefly with Ethel Traphagen at Cooper Union and George Bridgman at the Art Students' League. She staged the Movietone newsreel women's fashion sequences for many years.

== Partial filmography ==
- Silk for Summer Nights (1935)
- Fashion Forecast: For Play Hours (December 1939)
- Fashion Forecast: For Outdoors (April 1940)
- Fashion Forecast: For Country Life (July 1940)
- Behind the Footlights (April 1946)
- From Morn 'Til Dawn (April 1946)
- Talented Beauties (May 1949)

== Death ==
On June 27, 1965, Donner died of natural causes in her home at 205 West 57th Street in Manhattan.

== See also ==
- List of caricaturists
