= Paul McDonald =

Paul McDonald or Paul MacDonald may refer to:

- Paul McDonald (American football) (born 1958), American football player
- Paul McDonald (Australian footballer) (born 1956), Australian rules footballer
- Paul McDonald (Scottish footballer) (born 1968), Scottish footballer
- Paul McDonald (Gaelic footballer), Gaelic football player
- Paul M. McDonald (1955/1956–2025), Guamanian politician
- Paul McDonald (writer) (born 1961), English writer
- Paul McDonald (musician) (born 1984), American musician and finalist in season 10 of American Idol
- Paul MacDonald (canoeist) (born 1960), New Zealand canoeist
- Paul A. MacDonald (1912–2006), American politician and lawyer from Maine
- Paul K. MacDonald, American political scientist
