= Amnon David Ar =

Israeli painter

Amnon David Ar אמנון דוד ער
- Born: 12 December 1973; Tel Aviv
- Known for: Painting
- Awards: 2008 Winner of the first "Haim Shiff" competition, Tel Aviv Museum of Art

Amnon David Ar (Hebrew: אמנון דוד ער; born 12 December 1973 in Herzliyah, Israel) is an Israeli painter. Today, Ar teaches painting and drawing, with the intention of passing on to the next generation of artists, his experience, and with it his understanding of the artistic skills of the past. In 2014 Ar moved to Berlin, where he has his studio and teaches.

== Early career ==
He studied at the Arts and Crafts Municipal High School of Tel Aviv until the age of eighteen. After completing his compulsory military service, he studied anatomy with Oswald Adler. He then spent one year at the Bezalel Academy of Arts and Design in Jerusalem, before leaving, because he felt that both the training and the curriculum didn't provide the skills and knowledge he was looking for. For this reason, Ar decided to organize his own studies, and spent a further year learning painting and drawing with Abraham Bykov. By studying with older artists, Ar has traditionally trained himself, and can, at least in part, be considered an autodidact. During his studies, Ar worked as a chief illustrator and caricaturist at Maariv and also at Yedioth Tikshoret.

== Artistic style ==
Ar paints and draws his surroundings – both the people and the everyday objects he finds in Tel Aviv. He does this with a realist technique, often preferring to paint objects that are worn, rather than pristine. Robert Fishko, director of the Forum Gallery New York City says: "Ar loves the rich variety of forms in visual reality. Instead of hiding or improving its imperfections, he focuses on them with enthusiasm."

Dr. Bob Van Den Boogert, Curator of the Rembrandt House Museum in Amsterdam, states: "Ar loves the rich variety of forms in visual reality and instead of hiding or improving its imperfections he focuses on them with an eagerness that recalls Rembrandt's predilection for 'picturesque' subjects ... The rendering of the human body still is an artistic speciality which – especially nowadays – only a few painters really master. Ar is definitely one of them: his female nudes are modelled so delicately, and the texture of their skin is rendered in such a convincing way, that they really come to life on the canvas."

Van Den Boogert continues: "Ar is one of the great draughtsmen of our time. He excels in rapid sketches, but also in extremely detailed studies, done in graphite and charcoal, or in white pencil on black paper. The expressive power and the plasticity of his drawings have such graphic qualities, that one wonders why he has not tried his skills on graphic art yet. But that may be one of his future projects: perhaps the best is yet to come."

== Exhibitions and awards ==
=== Solo exhibitions ===
2020 Kunstverein Worms, Germany.

2020 Luftgeshäft, Kunstverein Schwezingen, Germany.

2018 Keep going, MZ Project room and Gallery, Berlin, Germany.

2018 Art Schöneberg, Berlin, Germany.

2017 Wie lange hält das Licht, MZ Project room and Gallery, Berlin, Germany.

2011 Body & Light, Mika Gallery, Tel Aviv, Israel.

2009 Tel Aviv Museum of Art, Tel Aviv, Israel.

2009 The Association of Painters and Sculptors – Jerusalem Artists House, Israel.

2007 Galerie Vieleers, Amsterdam, the Netherlands.

2005 Drawing & Several Paintings, Bernard Gallery, Tel Aviv Israel.

2004 Amnon David Ar – Painting, The Museum of Israeli Art, Ramat Gan, Israel.

=== Group exhibitions ===
2021 Dream, Kunstverein Rozig

2020 SCOPE immersive, Miami, USA.

2020 Art fair Parallel Vienna, Austria.

2020 Salon Hakubia, Jerusalem, Israel.

2019 The Shiff prize winners, The Tel Aviv Museum of art.

2018 NordArt, Büdelsdorf, Germany.

2018 Shopping- Haifa Museum, Israel.

2018 VII. INT. Malerei Biennale Hamburg, Germany.

2013 Face to Face Artists' self-portraits from the collection of Jackye and Curtis Finch Jr., Arkansas Art Center, USA.

2012 Fresh Paint art fair, Tel Aviv, Israel.

2012 People & Places, Medici Gallery, London, England.

2012 The Summer Exhibition, Medici Gallery, London, England.

2012 Art Any Way: Exploring The Wheel, Tel Aviv Museum of Art, Israel.

2011 A Road To Nowhere, Ashdod Museum of Fine Arts, Israel.

2011 Fresh Paint Art fair, Tel Aviv, Israel.

2011 True Colors, The Soho Gallery, London, the Cube Gallery, Manchester, England.

2010 Collections, Haifa Museum, Israel.

2010 Art Monaco fair, Monaco.

2008 Time Tunnel, Givataim Municipal Gallery, Israel.

2007 The Fine Art of Drawing – Modern & Contemporary Works on Paper, Forum Gallery, New York, USA.

2006 New Faces, Forum Gallery, New York, USA.

2006 The Armoury Show art fair, New York, USA.

2006 Realisme Amsterdam Fair, The Netherlands.

2006 Arkansas Art Center, collectors show, USA.

2005 The Museum of Israeli Art, Ramat Gan, Israel.

2005 The Jerusalem Center for the Performing Arts, Israel.

2002 Portraits, Tel Aviv Museum of Art, Israel.

2000 Observation Time, exhibition & catalog, Janco Dada Museum, Ein Hod, Israel

1999 Bezalel, Academy of Arts & Design, Jerusalem, Israel.

1998 Bat Yam Art Museum, Israel.

=== Awards ===
2020 Grand prize winner of SeeMee in Transition International competition NY, USA.

2011 Participant at the "Cité des Arts" residency project, Paris France.

2008 Winner of the first "Haim Shiff" competition, Tel Aviv Museum of Art, Israel.
