= Luigi Borgomainerio =

Italian engraver and caricaturist (1836–1876)

Luigi Borgomainerio (1836 – 1876) was an Italian engraver and caricaturist, who was active in the late 19th century.

Born at Como, Austrian Empire in 1836, Borgomainerio was one of the cleverest caricaturists in the Spirito Folletto, and the founder of the Mefistofele. Subsequently, he went to Brazil to engage in similar work for a comic paper, but died at Rio Janeiro in 1876, soon after his arrival.
