= Karl Meersman =

Belgian editorial cartoonist (born 1961)

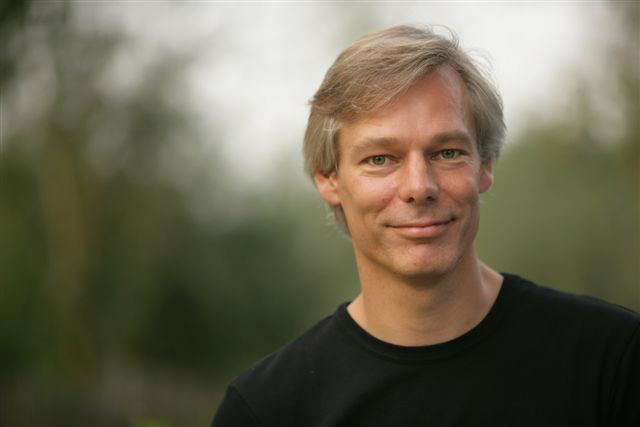
- 2005
- Born: 14 September 1961 (age 64); Temse, Belgium
- Education: Art history, graphic design, printmaking, publicity, figure drawing
- Occupation: Artist
- Known for: caricature, editorial cartoon, illustrator

Karl Meersman (born 14 September 1961) is a Belgian editorial cartoonist, living in Sint-Niklaas.

He is known for his weekly caricatures in the magazines Trends and Knack. Meersman is married to former VRT-television journalist and presenter Lies Martens.

Meersman's art has been widely lauded in the press, in the art world, and in politics. He gained international attention when his work was displayed in the Belgian consulate in New York City, in 2006–2007.

== Biography ==
=== Early life ===
Meersman comes from an artistic family. His grandfather was a painter, and both his mother and father were professional artists. When he was a young boy, his parents took him to the art school in Temse, where they worked as teachers. At age thirteen, he entered a drawing contest for children, but was disqualified because the jury did not believe his entry was drawn by a child.

After deciding he wanted to follow in the footsteps of his parents, he dropped out of high school and attended different art night schools instead. He was awarded degrees in publicity, printmaking, and figure drawing. In the meantime, his father sent him to a photogravure company, where Meersman held a day job. When his father's drawing workshop became too big to be run by a single person, he became permanently involved there. In 1991, together with two of his siblings, Meersman took over his father's drawing studio, Meersman I.D., to manage the ever-growing work load.

=== Career ===
Initially, Meersman was mainly occupied with work in the publicity sector. He was hired as a caricaturist by Trends, a business and finance magazine, in 1987 after he was noticed drawing visitors in a furniture shop; he has been drawing political cartoons for the magazine weekly ever since. Trends calls the cartoonist its "jester of the socio-economic society".

In 2002, he became the permanent illustrator for Focus Knack (a supplement to Knack news magazine), for which he draws caricatures of show-business people most of the time.

== Artwork ==
The artwork for magazines is done using traditional techniques: watercolor and pencil on paper. His interest in contemporary politics and news led him to political caricature as a living, and as he says: "I like to stand with both feet in the present, my work is a mirror of today."

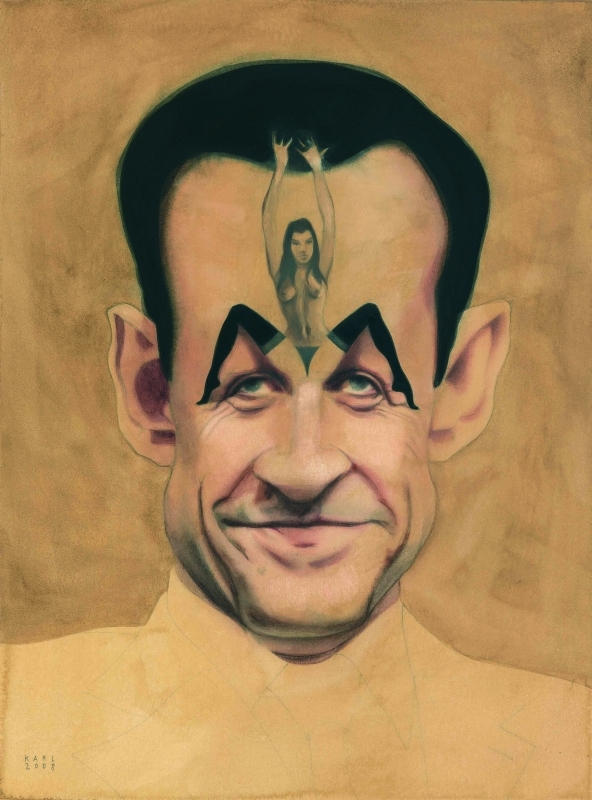
caricature of Nicolas Sarkozy and Carla Bruni (2008)

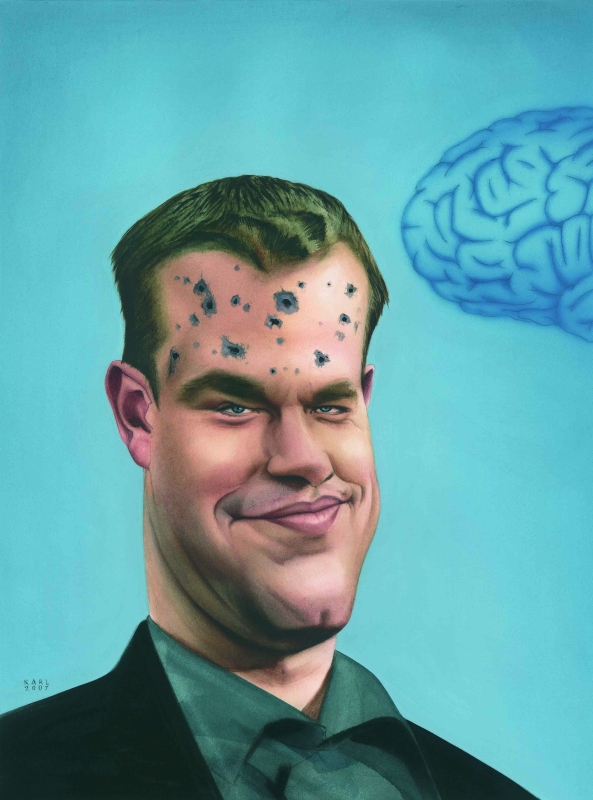
caricature of Matt Damon (2007)

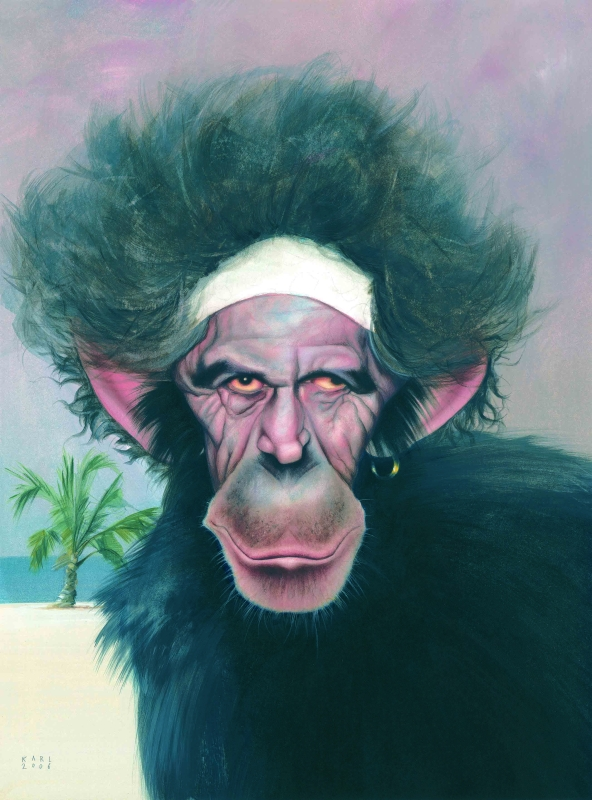
caricature of Keith Richards (2006)

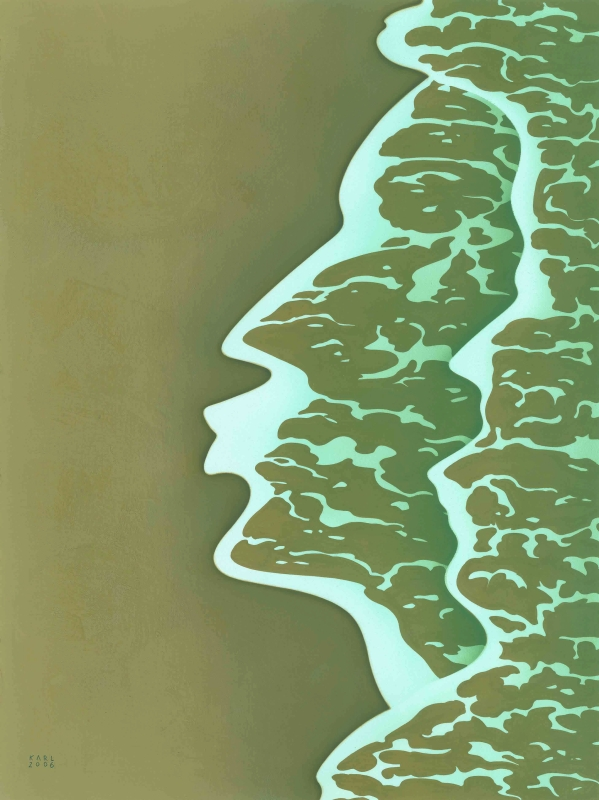
illustration De Kust (Dutch for The Coast and a word play on the word kust which can mean both coast and kiss) (2006)

As his biggest influences, he names Egon Schiele and the satirical prints in the tradition of Félicien Rops, Toulouse-Lautrec, and Honoré Daumier. His style is described as realism with a strong eye for detail.

Besides caricatures and editorial cartoons, Meersman also produces posters, stamps, paintings, and interior designs. In the past, he also produced book illustrations and children's books.

== Bibliography ==
=== Editorial cartoon ===
- Meersman; Karl (2010). VIPS TOO : very important paintings too. Roularta Books. ISBN 978-90-8679-358-7
- Meersman, Karl (2007). VIPS : very important paintings. Roularta. ISBN 978-90-5466-512-0
- Vandamme, Hugo and Cambien, Karel (2007). Illustrated by Meersman, Karl. Wat baten kaars en bril : management in spreekwoorden : wat je op school niet leert. Roularta. ISBN 978-90-5466-995-1
- Trends (2000). Illustrated by Meersman, Karl. België : tekenend en getekend 1990–2000 : Karl Meersman tekent tien jaar België / La Belgique traits pour traits 1990–2000 : Karl Meersman croque dix belges années. Roularta. ISBN 90-5466-478-9
- Seghers, Hendrik (1997). Illustrated by Meersman, Karl. De nieuwe collaboratie : een ondernemer in het verzet. Davidsfonds. ISBN 90-6152-655-8
- Trends (1993). Illustrated by Meersman, Karl. België in 30 hoofdstukken : over economie en politiek in de jaren '90. Roularta. ISBN 90-5466-073-2
- Uytterhoeven, Mark (1988). Illustrated by Meersman, Karl. Wat een jaar, beste spotliefhebber! : de hoogtepunten van het sportjaar 1988. Roularta. ISBN 90-72411-12-9

=== Child and young adult literature ===
- Meersman, Karl (2002). Een melkje wolk. Afijn. ISBN 90-5933-017-X
- Kolet, Janssen (2000). Illustrated by Meersman, Karl. Wisselkind : roman. Davidsfonds. ISBN 90-6565-935-8
- Linders, Jac (1999). Illustrated by Meersman, Karl. De derde kans. Davidsfonds. ISBN 90-6565-922-6
- De Maeyer, Gregie (1998). Illustrated by Meersman, Karl. De koningste koning. Davidsfonds. ISBN 90-6565-878-5
- Langenus, Ron (1997). Illustrated by Meersman, Karl. Onder de zwarte heuvel. Davidsfonds. ISBN 90-6565-777-0
- Linders, Jac (1997). Illustrated by Meersman, Karl. Complot tegen Jesse. Davidsfonds. ISBN 90-6565-820-3
- De Maeyer, Gregie (1996). Illustrated by Meersman, Karl. Ach. Davidsfonds. ISBN 90-6565-745-2
- Langenus, Ron (1996). Illustrated by Meersman, Karl. Het geheim van de Zwarte Dame. Davidsfonds. ISBN 90-6565-735-5

== See also ==
- List of caricaturists
- List of editorial cartoonists
