= Yusuf Lodhi =

- Born: 1938
- Died: 1996 (aged 57–58)
- Occupations: Cartoonist, Editor, Journalist, Graphic Designer, Author
- Known for: Political cartoons, Editorial work
- Notable work: Bhutto My Master, Sag Aza, Vai Ell on Faiz

Yusuf Lodhi (1938–1996) also known by his pen name Vai Ell, was a Pakistani editor, journalist, cartoonist and author. He was known for his political cartoons that criticized authoritarian regimes in Pakistan.

== Career ==
He began his editorial career working as an assistant editor for the Peshawar Times in 1969.

He later served in several well-known Pakistani newspapers, including The Daily Star, the Frontier Post, and "Herald" magazine of Dawn media group, before his death.

== Notable works ==
Lodhi’s published works include:

- Bhutto My Master – a collection of cartoons critical of Zulfikar Ali Bhutto's government. It was banned in the then-North-West Frontier Province (NWFP)
- Sag Aza
- Dushman Asman Apna
- There Was a Little Girl
- Vai Ell on Faiz – illustrations based on the verses of Faiz Ahmad Faiz.
