= Earle D. Chesney =

American cartoonist

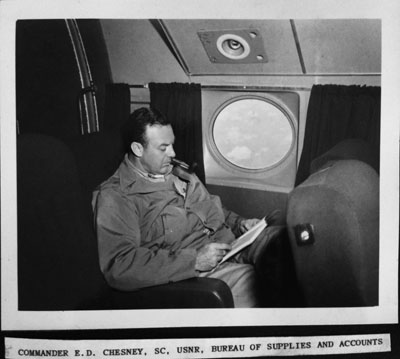
- Born: June 6, 1900; Swanton, Nebraska
- Died: April 29, 1966 (aged 65)
- Education: George Washington University (LL.B.)

Earle D. Chesney (June 6, 1900, Swanton, Nebraska – April 29, 1966) served with the Veterans Administration before joining the Eisenhower White House staff on March 4, 1954. Prior to his service with the VA, he served as Assistant Usher in the Hoover White House. During World War II and the Korean War he served with the Navy, reaching the rank of captain. During his naval service he became rather famous as the cartoonist who invented the naval character, “Eggburt of the Navy,” who, like the Army's “Sad Sack,” entertained service men and women around the world.

In his service as Assistant to the Deputy Assistant to the President, Chesney specialized in veterans' affairs, although he also dealt with such issues as disaster and drought legislation, public works, the economy, and the People to People International.

== Military service ==
Chesney served in the US Army as a Field Clerk from March, 1920, to June, 1921. He was commissioned Second Lieutenant, US Army Reserves, January 8, 1924, and served a 5-year period. Later, he was commissioned a Lieutenant Commander in the Navy Supply Corps during World War II (July, 1942) and served three-and-a-half years, the last as a Commander. He served in both the European and Pacific Theaters. Chesney returned to active duty during the Korean War with the rank of Captain and served until December, 1953.

== Government service ==
In 1924, Chesney was assigned to the US Capitol as the first Congressional liaison representative to assist Congress in its dealings with the Veterans Administration. He was detailed to the White House during the Hoover Administration as Assistant Usher and served during the first two years of that administration before returning to his liaison assignment.

He was appointed to President Eisenhower's staff in January, 1954. He was a government career man with 42 years of service, including three wars, when he left the White House in January, 1961. After leaving the White House, Chesney served as co-chairman for the Ceremonies and Re-enactment of the One Hundredth Anniversary of the First Inauguration of Abraham Lincoln.

== Personal ==
Chesney was a well-known artist specializing in caricatures. He worked his way through the George Washington University to an LL.B. degree by freelancing political cartoons. He was also on the staff of the student humor magazine, The Ghost.

He was the creator of the Eggburt Cartoon for the Navy Supply Corps; a book of World War II cartoons, Eggburt and Other Navy Cartoons was published by Anderson House in 1945. In addition to his cartoons, he has done thousands of portraits, with many members of Congress and high-ranking officers of the Armed Forces among his subjects. The originals of many of his White House cartoons are on collection at the Eisenhower Presidential Library in Abilene, Kansas.

Chesney was married to Louise Bockstahler on June 2, 1932. Chesney died on April 29, 1966, and was buried with full military honors in Arlington National Cemetery.
