= Khaldoun Talhouni =

Jordanian diplomat

Dr. Khaldoun Talhouni is a Jordanian diplomat, who, from 2006 to 2008, served as secretary general of Jordan’s foreign ministry.

On October 9, 2008, Talhouni presented his credentials to the Director-General of the OPCW (Organization for the Prohibition of Chemical Weapons) as the Permanent Representative of Hashemite Kingdom of Jordan. He concurrently served as Jordan's Ambassador to the Netherlands.

His other positions included serving as Ambassador to Estonia, First Secretary of the Embassy of Jordan in Washington D.C (1975 – 1979), Ambassador and Counsellor to Australia (1999 – 2004), Casablanca, Morocco (1987 – 1989) and Paris, France (1981 – 1986); Chargé d'Affaires of the Jordanian Embassy in Berne between 1995 and 1997 and also worked for the Jordanian Permanent Mission in Geneva as the Deputy Head from 1992 to 1995.

Ambassador Talhouni has a PhD degree in Political Science from the Sorbonne University, Paris (1984), a Masters in International Relations from the American University in Washington, DC (1978) and a bachelor's degree in Political Science and Public Administration from the University of Jordan (1972).
