= Unit (Cristian Fleming) =

- Born: Cristian R. Fleming; October 30, 1974 (age 51)
- Origin: Redwood City, California, U.S.
- Genres: IDM
- Occupations: Musician, Graphic Designer, Artist, Editorial cartoonist (Brooklyn Paper Weekly)
- Instruments: Sequencer, Keyboard (primary instruments); Computer; Sampler
- Years active: 1999 - 2008,
- Labels: Force Tracks, Inc.; Bohnerwachs Tontraeger; Resist Music; Caipirinha Foundation
- Website: http://www.cristianfleming.org

Unit is an electronic musician based in New York City. Unit began releasing electronic music officially at the age of 25, although he had musical involvement for many years prior, playing bass guitar at 17, and began working on electronic music at the age of 18. Unit has toured at various venues in Europe.

== Discography ==
- Hello ... My Name Is (CD, Maxi), Caipirinha Productions 1999
- The Narcoleptic Symphony (CD), Caipirinha Productions 1999
- Most Of Me Just Thinks It's Because You're Heartless (CDr), Co.Ad.Audio 2001
- FT037. Imp. - Music To Fix My Boat By [12"] (11/2001)
- I Came Here To Tell You How It's Going To Begin (CD), Co.Ad.Audio 2004
- I Came Here To Tell You How It's Going To Begin (CD), Modulo 2004
- Hello ... My Name Is (12"), Bohnerwachs Tontraeger 2005
- The Narcoleptic Symphony (2xLP), Bohnerwachs Tontraeger 2005
- The Narcoleptic Symphony / Hello... My Name Is (3x12"), Bohnerwachs Tontraeger 2005

Music Also Appears On:

- Trax Sampler 025 (CD, Smplr) Ring Worm Trax Sampler (1999)
- Across The Cell Wall (CD) Untitled Kodama (2000)
- The Wire Tapper 4 (CD) Ring*worm Wire Magazine (2000)
- It Sounds Different - Sweet Electro (CD) Static Beef Different (2002)
- Crash Redevelopment (CD) Medicine is Using (Mag... Co.Ad.Audio (2003)
- WIDE Presents... (LP) Boloni Wider (2005)
- At The Controls (2xCD) Your Arrival Is Our Ar... Resist Music (2007)

== Aliases ==
- Unit
- Mr. S. Pants
- Dotman
- Imp

== Other activities ==
Fleming is also a professional freelance graphic designer for various New York design firms and is an avid editorial cartoonist for The Brooklyn Paper.
