= Tulal =

Indian cartoonist

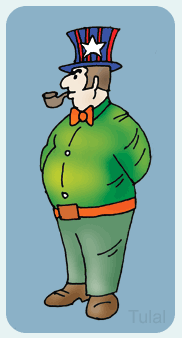
A cartoon by Tulal

Tulal is a cartoonist from India. His daily sketched cartoons have been published in the daily newspaper Rashtriya Sahara since January 2001.

Tulal has been interested in cartoons for about thirty years. His website was launched c. 1998. His work has appeared in a range of places such as ThinkIndia.com (merged into Rediff.com), Jaal, Funtoosh, Avadh Online (an ISP in Lucknow), and Indianradiologist.com. His cartoons have also appeared in the Norwegian publication "World Magazine X" and a leading magazine of Dubai, "International Indian".
