= Mir Suhail Qadri =

Indian cartoonist and fashion designer

Mir Suhail
- Born: 25 June 1989 (age 37); Srinagar, Jammu and Kashmir, India
- Occupation: Cartoonist Fashion Designer

Mir Suhail (born 25 June 1989) is a political cartoonist from Jammu and Kashmir.

== Education and career ==
During April 2015 Nepal earthquake Qadri's cartoon on biased media coverage of Indian media went viral on social networking sites after Nepal social media users criticized mainstream Indian media for insensitive coverage and started a trend on Twitter and Facebook #GoHomeIndianMedia

== Achievements ==
Airports Authority of India selected his sketches for their calendar and New Year greeting cards after he won a national competition in the year (2012).
