= List of caricaturists =

A caricaturist is an artist who specializes in drawing caricatures.

== List of caricaturists ==
- Abed Abdi (born 1942)
- Abril Lamarque (1904–1999)
- Al Hirschfeld (1903–2003)
- Alex Gard (1900–1948)
- Alexander Saroukhan (1898–1977)
- Alfred Frueh (1880–1968)
- Alfred Grévin (1827–1892)
- Alfred Schmidt (1858–1938)
- Amédée de Noé, also known as Cham (1818–1879)
- Amnon David Ar (born 1973)
- Andre Gill (1840–1885)
- Angelo Torres (born 1932)
- Arifur Rahman (born 1984)
- Arthur Good (1853–1928)
- Aurelius Battaglia (1910–1984)
- Lluís Bagaria (1882–1940)
- Balasaheb Thackeray (1926–2012)
- Bill Plympton (born 1946)
- Bob Staake (born 1957)
- Boris Yefimov (1899–2008)
- Bruce Stark (1933–2012)
- Cabu (1938–2015)
- Cal Bailey (1909–1988)
- Carlo Pellegrini (1839–1889)
- Cem Kiziltug (born 1974)
- Charles Williams (1798–1830)
- Conrado Walter Massaguer (1889–1965)
- Dan Dunn (born 1957)
- Daniel Stieglitz (born 1980)
- David Levine (1926–2009)
- Sir David Low (1891–1963)
- Don Barclay (1892–1975)
- Donald Bevan (1920–2013)
- Drew Friedman
- Dušan Petričić (born 1946)
- Edmund S. Valtman (1914–2005)
- Emad Hajjaj (born 1967)
- Émile Cohl (1857–1938)
- Emilio Coia (1911–1997)
- GAL (born 1940)
- Gaspard-Félix Tournachon, also known as Nadar (1820–1910)
- George Bahgoury (born 1932)
- George Bickham the Younger (c. 1706–1771)
- George Cruikshank (1792–1880)
- George Moutard Woodward (c. 1760–1809)
- George Wachsteter (1911–2004)
- Georges Goursat (1863–1934)
- Gerald Scarfe (born 1936)
- Gerhard Haderer (born 1951)
- Glen Hanson
- Glynis Sweeny (born 1962)
- György Rózsahegyi (1940–2010)
- Henri de Toulouse-Lautrec (1864–1901)
- H. M. Bateman (1887–1970)
- Henry Bunbury (1750–1811)
- Henry Wigstead (died 1800)
- Hermann Mejia (born 1973)
- Honoré Daumier (1808–1879)
- Isa Macnie (1869–1958)
- Isaac Cruikshank (1786–1856)
- Jack Davis (1924–2016)
- Jacques Callot (1592–1635)
- James Gillray (1756–1815)
- James Sayers (caricaturist) (1748–1825)
- Jaume Capdevila, "Kap" (born 1974)
- Javad Alizadeh (born 1953)
- J.J. Grandville (1803–1847)
- Jean-Pierre Dantan (1800–1869)
- Jeff Hook (1928–2018)
- Jim McDermott (born 1960)
- Joe Grant (1908–2005)
- Joseph Barbera (1911–2006)
- John Collier (1708–1786)
- John Doyle (1797–1868)
- John Kay (1742–1826)
- John Leech (1817–1864)
- John Tenniel (1820–1914)
- Jovan Prokopljević (born 1940)
- Karl Meersman (born 1961)
- Kate Carew (1869–1961)
- Ken Fallin (born 1948)
- Kenny Meadows (1790–1874)
- Kerry G. Johnson (born 1966)
- Kerry Waghorn (born 1947)
- Louis Hirshman (1905–1986)
- Luigi Borgomainerio (1836–1876)
- Malky McCormick (1943–2019)
- Marc Sleen (1922–2016)
- Marjorie Organ (1886–1930)
- Massoud Mehrabi (1954–2020)
- Max Beerbohm (1872–1956)
- Melchiorre Delfico (1825–1895)
- Mort Drucker (1929–2020)
- Morten Morland (born 1979)
- Murray Webb (born 1947)
- Nikolai Stepanov (1807–1877)
- Oğuz Aral (1936–2004)
- Osama Hajjaj (born 1973)
- Oscar Berger (1901–1997)
- Omaya Joha (born 1972)
- Patrick Oliphant (born 1935)
- Paul Gavarni (1804–1866)
- Pedro X. Molina
- Peggy Bacon (1895–1987)
- Peter Fluck (born 1941)
- Philip Burke (born 1956)
- Pier Leone Ghezzi (1674–1755)
- Prakash Shetty (born 1960)
- Predrag Koraksić Corax (born 1933)
- Rafael Bordalo Pinheiro (1846–1905)
- Ralph Steadman (born 1936)
- Ranan Lurie (1932–2022)
- Raoul Hunter (1926–2018)
- Richard Newton (1777–1798)
- Robert Grossman (1940–2018)
- Robert Risko (born 1956)
- Roger Law (born 1941)
- Ronald Searle (1920–2011)
- S. Jithesh (born 1974)
- Sam Berman (1906–1995)
- Sam Norkin (1917–2011)
- Sam Viviano (born 1953)
- Sebastian Krüger (born 1963)
- Seyran Caferli (born 1966)
- Shawn McManus (born 1958)
- Shekhar Gurera, India (born 1965)
- Stephen Rotluanga (born 1952)
- Steve Bell (born 1951)
- Steve Brodner (born 1954)
- Thomas Nast (1840–1902)
- Thomas Rowlandson (1757–1827)
- Tom Bachtell (born 1957)
- Tom Richmond (born 1966)
- Vitaliy Peskov (1944–2002) (Russian: Виталий Песков)
- Vyvyan Donner (1895–1965)
- William Auerbach-Levy (1889–1964)
- William Austin (1721–1820)
- William Heath (1794–1840)
- William Hogarth (1697–1764)
- William Makepeace Thackeray (1811–1863)
- Wolo (1902–1989)
- Wyncie King (1884–1961)
- Xavier Cugat (1900–1990)

== See also ==
- List of cartoonists
- List of editorial cartoonists
- List of graphic designers
- List of science fiction visual artists
