= Chai Rachawat =

Thai cartoonist

Chai Rachawat (Thai: ชัย ราชวัตร) is the pen name of Thai cartoonist Somchai Katanyutanant (สมชัย กตัญญุตานันท์, born 2 June 1941). One of the most popular and influential cartoonists in Thailand, his best known work is the political cartoon Phuyai Ma kap Thung Ma Moen (ผู้ใหญ่มากับทุ่งหมาเมิน), which appears in the daily Thai Rath newspaper.

== Biography ==
Somchai Katanyutanant was born to an ethnic Chinese family in Ubon Ratchathani Province on 19 June 1941. He graduated from Benchama Maharat School and studied at the Bangkok Business College because he wanted to work at the bank. After graduation, he worked at the Bank of Ayudhya. Not so long after he worked at the bank, he then resign from the work due to tiresomeness. Chai had an unusual path that led him to political cartoons. As a boy, he seemed like a perfect prospect to become a political cartoonist, because he had an interest in both politics and drawing cartoons.

== Printing industry ==
Chai Ratchawat begins his career in art department for Sport magazine name "The game" and start writing about political after the event on October 6, 1976. For the magazine he works for is Thongchai and (Thai: หนังสือมหาราษฎร์. His first comic about political was (Thai: ใครจะเอากระพรวนไปแขวนคอแมว). And because of this Chai has to move to Los Angeles and America for 2 years and back to Thailand and keep drawing and also write a story name (Thai: "ผู้ใหญ่มากับทุ่งหมาเมิน"in the Daily News and Thai Rath.

== Political Role ==
That was a report that PDRC support Chai to become a committee of for people foundation or (Thai: มูลนิธิมวลมหาประชาชน) and the objective of this foundation is to help people who is a victim in the (Thai: การชุมนุมทางการเมือง) and for collecting money to reform the country.

== Award ==
- Sriburapha Award in A.D. 2000
- ศ.บำรุงสุข สีหอำไพ Award From Communication Arts, Chulalongkorn University in 2008
- Thai news report society Award
- Award from Rangsit University
- Award from Thai cultural committee
- ม.ร.ว.อายุมงคล Award from Mahasarakham University in 2003

== Work ==
- Caricature cartoon (Thai: ผู้ใหญ่มากับทุ่งหมาเมิน"), published daily in Thairath Newspaper
- The Story of Mahajanaka in cartoon edition
- The Story of Tongdaeng in cartoon edition
- ไทยถลอก(ปอกเปิก) ISBN 9786163878397 published by Preaw
- สังคมสังคัง ISBN 9789744752055 published by Preaw
- เด็กชายแตงโม ISBN 9789742471491 published by Preaw
- ตามประสาการ์ตูนนิสต์ ISBN 9747520389 published by Amarin pocket book
- หนังสือสื่อสนุกปลุกจินตนาการ by SCG Foundation in 2014
