= Sam Norkin =

American cartoonist (1917–2011)

Samuel Norkin (January 10, 1917 – July 30, 2011) was a Brooklyn, New York-born cartoonist who specialized in theater caricatures for more than seven decades. His drawings of theater, opera, ballet and film celebrities appeared in Variety, Backstage, The Philadelphia Inquirer, The Washington Post, Los Angeles Times, The Boston Globe and many other publications.

Norkin learned composition and anatomy from the muralist Mordi Gassner. He received a scholarship to the Metropolitan Art School after his high school graduation, and he later attended Cooper Union, the Brooklyn Museum Art School and the School of Fine and Industrial Art. During the 1940s, newspaper editors wanted to devote more space to new theatrical productions, but photo opportunities usually did not happen until a show opened. Norkin took advantage of the situation and gained access to rehearsals, performers, costume sketches, fittings and scenic designs, providing editors with illustrations prior to an opening.

From 1940 to 1956, his theatrical illustrations were a regular feature in the New York Herald Tribune. Then for the next 26 years, he covered the performing arts for the Daily News. Since 1940, Norkin has had more than 4000 drawings published.

When he began doing theatrical caricature, he supplied his own captions, which eventually prompted him to write articles and reviews. He was an art critic for the Carnegie Hall house program and a cultural reporter for the Daily News.

== Books ==
Norkin's theater reminiscences and 266 drawings came together in the book Sam Norkin, Drawings, Stories (Heinemann, 1994), which was reviewed by David Barbour:

A Norkin caricature is often densely packed with detail and may feature a great deal of solid black space. He also is more daring in his drafting; many of his pieces, in particular one from the Broadway production of The Phantom of the Opera, feature steeply raked lines which plunge vertiginously from top to bottom, to highly dramatic effect. On the other hand, many of Norkin's effects border on the surreal. His version of Michael Jeter and Jane Krakowski in Grand Hotel depicts the pair as a series of interrlated curves; Jeter, in particular, looks like a machine that you crank up and let loose on stage. His version of Constance Cummings as a stroke victim in Wings, uses cruelly sharp angles to create a Cubist deconstruction of the actress's face and limbs, which mirrors the disintegration of the character's mental functions. Norkin offers a wide-ranging collection of his works... He also showscases actors at different points in their careers (as in a trio of portraits of John Gielgud and Ralph Richardson) and different takes on different productions (he gives us a number of Salomes from the Metropolitan and New York City Operas).

== Exhibitions ==
Artwork by Norkin has been exhibited in the Lincoln Center Library and Museum of the Performing Arts, the Museum of the City of New York, the Metropolitan Opera House, the Hudson River Museum in (Yonkers, New York) and various galleries.

== Awards ==
In 1942, Sam Norkin drew Joan Roberts, who was then starring on Broadway in Oklahoma!.

Various awards received over the years by Norkin include an award for "Outstanding Theater Art" from the League of American Theatres and Producers. (1980) and an award for “Lifetime Body of Work” (1995) from the Drama Desk, the association of drama critics, drama editors and drama reporters. He received two awards from the National Cartoonists Society, the Special Features Award (1980) and the Silver T-Square Award (1984).

== See also ==
- Al Hirschfeld
- Kin Platt
- List of caricaturists
