= Mike Flugennock =

American cartoonist

Mike Flugennock (born Michael Swartzbeck; March 1957) is a political cartoonist from Washington, D.C.

Since the early 1990s, Flugennock's political posters have been pasted across Washington D.C. His work is known for its universal criticism of politicians and other government figures of both main parties. During the Clinton era, most of his posters were critical of President Bill Clinton's military actions, and policies such as the North American Free Trade Agreement (NAFTA), the Communications Decency Act, and the Defense of Marriage Act and later President George W. Bush for his domestic and foreign policies. Of the Democratic Party, he believes it is unable to provide a true, progressive alternative to the Republican party. Since the 2006 mid-term elections, he has been more critical of the Democrats, particularly Barack Obama, Hillary Clinton and Bernie Sanders.

His cover art for the October 2002 edition of The Progressive magazine was his first for a national magazine. Flugennock was a member of the editorial board of DC Indymedia through April 2009.

In addition to national politics, Flugennock is often critical of D.C. politicians, and he has made several posters criticizing Mayor Anthony Williams, whom he depicts as a rat. Flugennock is the subject of a 2016 documentary titled Flugennock by Ron Douglas.

Flugennock submitted a cartoon as an entry in the International Holocaust Cartoon Competition. In an email to the Associated Press, he stated: "It specifically addresses policies of the Israeli state with regard to its behavior in Palestine, and their similarities to the strategies employed by the Nazi regime in Warsaw and elsewhere." He rejected claims the cartoon was antisemitic.
