= Mahmoud Kahil =

Lebanese-born British cartoonist

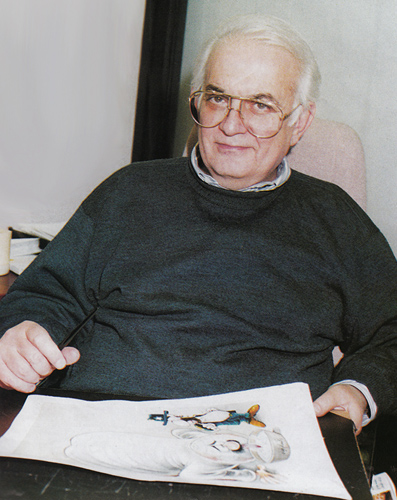
Portrait of Mahmoud Kahil

Mahmoud Kahil محمود كحيل (Arabic: محمود كحيل; 1936 - February 11, 2003) was a Lebanese-born British editorial cartoonist.

== Life and career ==
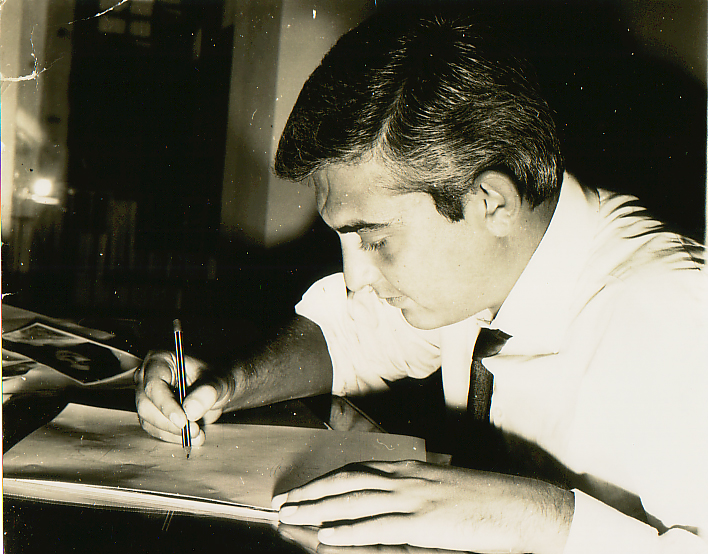
Mahmoud Kahil in the 1960s

Mahmoud Kahil was born in Tripoli, North Lebanon in 1936.

He enrolled at the American University of Beirut, but dropped out in his sophomore year to work as a graphic designer at an advertising agency in Beirut and pursue cartooning.

Kahil joined the weekly magazine Al Usbu Al-Arabi as a layout designer from 1961 to 1963. While working as an art director for various publications, he also began drawing professional cartoons. From 1963 to 1965 he drew the cartoon strip Busat Al Rih in the children's magazine Shahrazade. In 1965, he moved to the Lissan Al Hal newspaper and started publishing his first political cartoons editorially, remaining with the paper until 1966. Kahil drew cartoons for Mu'assassat Al Hayat from 1966 to 1968 before moving to Dar Annahar from 1968-1971 to work as art director of Al Hasna' Magazine. From 1971 to 1973, he was art director for Al-Usbu' Alarabi while also publishing cartoons in the English-language Daily Star newspaper and Monday Morning magazine.

In 1967, Kahil, along with Farid Salman and Roro Breidi, began producing the newsreel series Actualitees Libanaises exclusively for cinemas in Hamra, Beirut. The artists would film the audience entering the cinemas, develop the footage and then screen the clips back to the audience before the film began.

Kahil had a daughter, Dana, and a son, Nazmi. Nazmi was born on the 13th of April 1975, the day the Lebanese Civil War broke out.

== Death ==
Mahmoud Kahil died at the age of 66 from complications during a heart surgery in London on 11 February 2003.

== Mahmoud Kahil Award ==
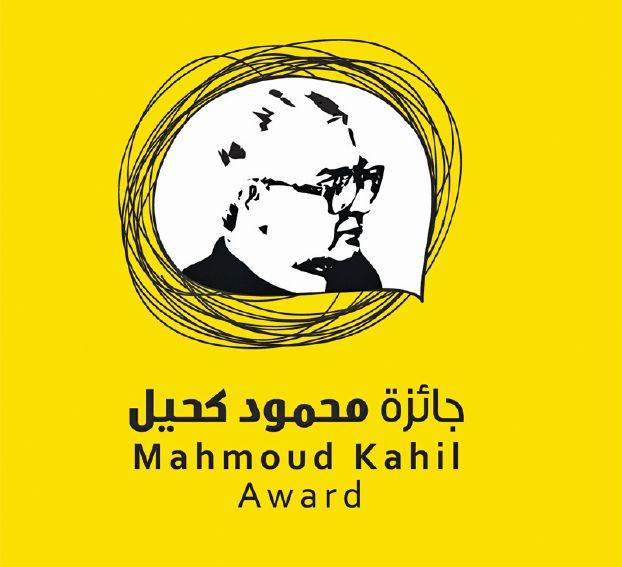
جائزة محمود كحيل Mahmoud Kahil Award logo

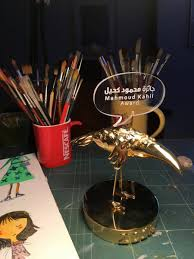
The Lifetime Achievement Hall of fame - Lujaina Assil, recipient, Year 1

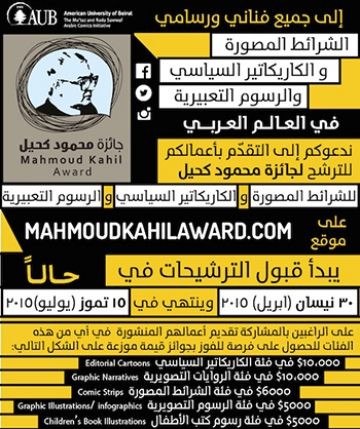
جائزة محمود كحيل Mahmoud Kahil Award categories

On 29 April 2015 an initiative by Mutazz and Rada Sawwaf was launched at the American University of Beirut to create a new comics award for all talent in the Arab world in the field of cartoons, illustrations and graphic design, to be named "The Mahmoud Kahil Award".

The awards categories are:

- Editorial Cartoons ($10,000)
- Graphic Novels ($10,000)
- Comic Strips ($6,000)
- Graphic Illustrations ($5,000)
- Children's Book Illustrations ($5,000)

Additionally, two honorary awards are made:

- The Lifetime Achievement Hall of fame, recognizing an outstanding dedication and service for a minimum of 25 years in the fields of graphic arts and cartoons
- The Comics Guardian Award, recognizing those who have extensively supported comics and cartoons in the Arab world through preserving, collecting, promoting, publishing, teaching or exhibiting this art, and thereby contributing to the cultural heritage of the region.

== Mahmoud Kahil stamp ==
LibanPost has released the Mahmoud Kahil Award stamp as recognition to the artist's legacy. The stamp was presented to Mr & Mrs Sawwaf and Kahil's family by Aouni Kaaki.

== Awards ==
1984 - Best Arab Cartoonist of the year by the Mustapha & Ali Amin journalism award

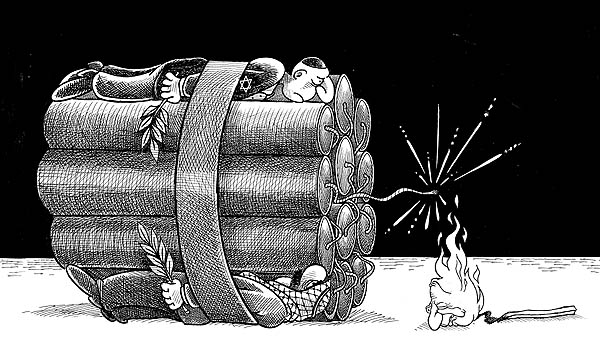
Arabo - Israelie Bloody Conflict by Mahmoud Kahil

== Media ==
- Only known recording of Kahil, 1992 on YouTube
- Mahmoud Kahil Youtube Channel
- My Father - blog/films By Dana Mahmoud Kahil
- Book published in October 2014 by Nazda Ltd: According to Kahil
