= Paul McDonald (Gaelic footballer) =

Irish Gaelic footballer

Personal information
- Native name: Pól MacDónaill (Irish)
- Nickname: Gilly
- Born: County Laois, Ireland

Sport
- Sport: Gaelic football
- Position: -Wing Back
Club
- Years: Club
- ? -?: Arles–Killeen
Inter-county
- Years: County
- ?- ?: Laois
Inter-county titles
- Leinster titles: 1

Paul McDonald is a Laois footballer who won an All-Ireland Minor Football Championship medal in 1997 and a Leinster Senior Football Championship medal in 2003.

McDonald plays for the Arles–Killeen club with whom he has won 3 Laois Intermediate Football Championship medals and in 2006 he was part of the team that reached the Laois Senior Football Championship final where they were beaten by Ballyroan Gaels.

McDonald was a pupil of Presentation College, Askea, Carlow from 1992 to 1997 & was a member of the school Gaelic football teams.
