= Tiwwat Pattarakulvanich =

Thai cartoonist

- Born: Bangkok, Thailand

Tiwwat Pattarakulvanich or Tiwat Patarakulwanij (Thai: ทิววัฒน์ ภัทรกุลวณิชย์), known under the pen name Mor, is a Thai cartoonist. He is considered as one of "today's prominent political cartoonists" in Thailand. He works mainly for the newspapers Krungthep Turakij (Thai: กรุงเทพธุรกิจ) and Bangkok Post. His work has been distributed internationally. He was awarded an Aydin Dogan Foundation's Cartoon Competition Award 2007.

== Education ==
Pattarakulvanich was born in Bangkok on June 9, and he practices Buddhism. After he graduated from Saint Gabriel School, he attended Changsin College (Thai: วิทยาลัยช่างศิลป์) and then attended Silpakorn University, where he graduated with bachelor's and master's degrees.

== Teaching ==
He was a lecturer at Rangsit University, Thammasat University (1990-1992), instructor at Silpakorn University (1990-1992), and instructor at Bangkok University (since 2008). Since 2009, he has been Special Lecturer at Master of fine arts program in computer arts at Thammasat University.

== Writing and cartooning ==
Pattarakulvanich was persuaded by Chai Rachawat (Thai: ชัย ราชวัตร) to submit a cartoon in a competition for a weekly newspaper. At that time, he then became a full-time professional cartoonist for the Siam Post, Siam Rath weekly, and other newspapers. He worked with an illustrator team of Thongdaeng. His work is primarily humorous caricatures.

He wrote a novel, which was published in 1996. He worked with the Siamrath weekly newspapers from 1993 to 2005. He worked with the Bangkok Post starting in 2003. He worked on Amarin Book works.(Thai: เริ่มจากเรา)

For Bangkokbiznews, he wrote 3 columns, which are (Thai: คอลัมน์เก็บไว้ด้วยปลายพู่กัน) during 2008-2010, (Thai: คอลัมน์เด็กหลังห้อง) during 2005-2006, and (Thai: คอลัมน์ที่ชอบ) during 2008-2009. He draws a satirical political cartoon for A Day magazine, which use an international comic character method, to satirize the political situation in Thailand.

== Awards ==
- The ESCAP 50th Anniversary Cartoon Exhibition, Third Prize in 1997 in occasion of 50th anniversary of ESCAP
- The Aydin Dogan Foundation's Cartoon Competition Award 2007, "Success Award", in Turkey.
