= Khaldoun Al Tabari =

Jordanian businessman (born 1950)

Khaldoun Tabari
- خلدون الطبري
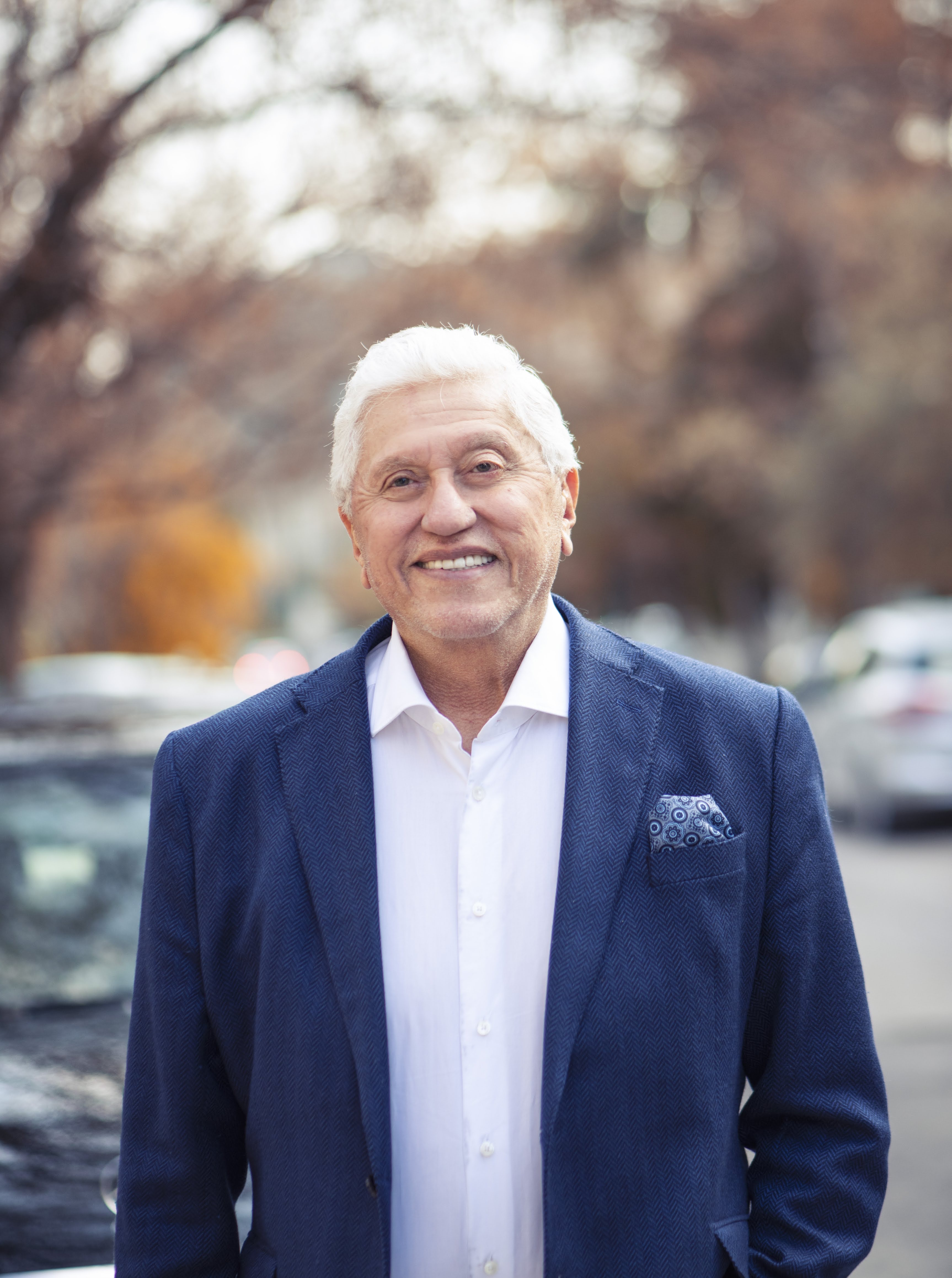
- Tabari in 2015
- Born: Khaldoun Rashid Tabari; January 1, 1950 (age 76); Jerusalem
- Education: University of Colorado
- Occupation: Businessman
- Title: Chief executive of Drake & Scull International
- Term: 1998–2016
- Successor: Wael Allan
- Spouse: Rola Tabari
- Children: 4

Khaldoun Rashid Tabari (born 1950) is a Jordanian businessman who led Drake & Scull International (DSI), a Dubai-based mechanical, electrical and plumbing (MEP) and construction contractor, from 1998 to 2016. After his departure, he was charged of financial violations in the United Arab Emirates in 2025 and court ordered him to pay the company about AED 152 million (US$41.3 million) in damages.

== Early life and education ==
Tabari was born in the Palestinian territories in 1950 and grew up there. His mother died when he was two, and after his father died of cancer when he was 13, he was raised by his eldest brother. He attended the Friends Boys' School, a Quaker school in Ramallah, and then studied at the University of Colorado in Boulder, where he earned a bachelor of science degree in management.

== Career ==
=== Early career ===
After graduating, Tabari went to work in the United Arab Emirates with his two brothers, who ran Ranya Trading & Contracting and served as its director and the general manager. He later spent two years in London importing and exporting materials such as cables, lighting and heavy machinery. In 1982, he moved to Saudi Arabia and joined Drake & Scull, a company of British origin, where he worked on a project to install radar stations and underground command centres in Saudi Arabia.

=== Drake & Scull International ===
In 1998, Tabari bought a majority stake in Drake & Scull International, the former overseas arm of a British company, which then had annual revenue of less than AED 100 million. By 2013, it had grown from an MEP contractor into a multi-disciplinary company with business units in water and power, oil and gas, civil contracting and rail.

In July 2008, DSI sold 55 percent of its shares in an initial public offering and raised about AED 1.2 billion. DSI then expanded through acquisitions and acquired Passavant-Roediger, a German wastewater treatment company, in November 2009, and the Riyadh-based contractor International Center for Contracting in April 2011.

DSI reported losses of AED 826.6 million in 2015 and AED 732.9 million in 2016. Tabari submitted his resignation as chief executive to the board in August 2016, and in October he was succeeded by the company's chief operating officer, Wael Allan. Tabari, who then held 8.24 per cent of the shares, remained vice chairman, a non-executive board member and a member of the executive committee. In February 2017, as DSI underwent a recapitalisation and financial restructuring, he resigned from the board and agreed to sell his shares to Tabarak Investment.

=== Other business interests ===
Tabari previously operated franchises of Mrs. Fields cookies and Thrifty Car Rental. He was also chairman of the global operations of EFS Facilities Services, a facilities management company that had operations in 19 countries. EFS had been part of DSI until 2006, when it was separated ahead of DSI's own listing and a stake was sold to Emcor Facilities and a small group of shareholders, who bought out Emcor in 2009. In May 2013, he was appointed to the board of the interiors contractor Depa. He was also a board member of Cedar Mills, EMCOR Facilities Services Group (Middle East), Energy Central, First Qatar Real Estate, Jordan Fleet Leasing Company, and Walltech.

== Legal proceedings ==
In June 2018, UAE authorities froze Tabari's bank accounts in the country and issued a travel ban against him. By July 2018, an internal investigation by DSI had found that Tabari and his daughter Zeina owed the company as much as AED 1 billion (US$272.3 million). Tabari denied that he or his daughter owed DSI any money. DSI filed 15 complaints against him with the public prosecutor in Abu Dhabi in 2018.

In January 2020, Tabari was arrested at Queen Alia International Airport in Amman as he was about to fly to the United Kingdom, under an Interpol red notice, after UAE authorities had issued an international warrant against him. He was released on bail and his passport was retained. DSI then filed further complaints with the Abu Dhabi Public Funds Prosecution against his daughter and other former executives after the prosecution had charged Tabari with offences including misappropriation, fraud, embezzlement and forgery, and sought his extradition to the UAE. Tabari denied any criminal activity.

In January 2021, the public prosecutor in Amman indicted Tabari, his daughter and a former DSI employee, Saleh Mustafa Muradweij, before the Criminal Court of Amman on felony charges of fraud in buying, selling or managing state or public funds. Tabari and his daughter also faced a misdemeanour charge of fraud and breach of trust. The charges, which had a total value of AED 14 million (US$3.8 million), concerned DSI's One at Palm Jumeirah joint venture and two projects in Saudi Arabia. In December 2021, the Amman Criminal Court acquitted Tabari and his daughter of all charges. At that time, 15 other criminal cases against Tabari, his daughter and other former officials remained registered with the UAE Federal Public Prosecutor, along with civil cases in UAE courts, and that his assets in the UAE remained frozen.

In February 2022, Jordanian court convicted Tabari in a separate case, sentencing him to one year in prison and ordering him to pay AED 60 million, and that he had not been in Jordan when the ruling was issued.

In July 2024, the Dubai Court of Appeal ruled that Tabari and Saleh Muradweij, a former executive director at DSI Construction, were liable to pay DSI AED 151.97 million. In January 2025, the Dubai Court of Cassation issued a final ruling ordering the two to pay DSI about AED 152 million (US$41.3 million) as compensation for material and moral damages, with interest at 5 percent from the date the judgment became final. The Public Funds Prosecution in Abu Dhabi had also imposed attachments on Tabari's funds and assets.

== Personal life ==
Tabari and his wife, Rola, have three daughters and a son.
