= Oscar Berger (cartoonist) =

American cartoonist

- Born: May 12, 1901; Prešov, Kingdom of Hungary, Austria-Hungary
- Died: May 15, 1997 (aged 96)
- Occupations: Caricaturist; Cartoonist
- Notable work: World leaders; Numerous celebrities

Oscar Berger (May 12, 1901 – May 15, 1997) was a Slovak-born American caricaturist and cartoonist. His work appeared in numerous newspapers and magazines, and he authored and illustrated seven books. Some of the notable people who have sat for him to be drawn include: Winston Churchill, Pope Pius XII, Robert Frost, Charles de Gaulle, Marcel Marceau, Pablo Casals, Gina Lollobrigida, Christopher Morley, Bernard Shaw, Charlie Chaplin, Maria Tallchief, Ralph Richardson, Andrei Gromyko, Carlos P. Romulo, Valeska Gert, John Foster Dulles, and eight U.S. presidents.

== Biography and career ==
Oscar Berger was born on May 12, 1901 in Prešov, Austria-Hungary (now in Slovakia). He started drawing at the age of three, and at the age of seven, he published his first book entitled "My Life", on a miniature printing press. While growing up, he traveled with his parents to Budapest, Vienna and Paris. After graduating from high school in Levoča, he left for Prague where he continued his self-education in art; drawing the landscape and architecture of the city, and sometimes informal sketches of people passing by. One of these attracted the attention of the editors of a Berlin newspaper, resulting in an invitation to become its chief staff artist, and his work started to appear regularly in European newspapers. He was present at the Munich trials of 1923 where his drawings pilloried Hitler and the other defendants on trial; his drawings once causing so much laughter among the foreign journalists, that the whole group was cleared out of the court room. In 1928, he made his first trip to the United States, where a collection of his drawings were exhibited at the Advertising Club in New York City. It was during this visit that New York Governor Al Smith introduced him to Franklin Roosevelt. Berger recalls that when he asked him to sit for a drawing, Roosevelt quipped: "Yes, I'll be glad to, but don't you think it a waste of your time?" When he became president five years later, Berger sketched him again.

When Hitler rose to power in 1932, Berger was faced with a difficult decision, since many of his drawings of Hitler ridiculed him. He decided that leaving Germany would be his best option before any repercussions could occur. He then returned to Prague, and also lived in Budapest, Vienna, Paris, London, depending on where his work took him. In 1940, he was living in London during The Blitz, and he had the opportunity to sketch Winston Churchill as he was talking with cabinet members in a corridor of the House of Commons. Berger later recalled: "The raid was heavy; hundreds of bombers came over in waves. As the ancient buildings shook under the impact of bursting bombs, I saw Churchill's heavy jowl set with determination. I trembled as I sketched. Churchill never winced, but seemed to gather new strength as he spoke". Berger remained in England throughout the war years working for The Evening News, the Sunday Dispatch and The Daily Telegraph. After the war ended, he came to San Francisco in 1945 to cover the League of Nations conference for The New York Times. He drew multiple world leaders in attendance at the conference, including Andrei Gromyko and Carlos P. Romulo. By 1945, he had moved to New York City, and in 1955, he officially became a U.S. citizen. In 1985, he observed how publications were always writing about Gromyko's "dour" smile, Berger said when he first met him in San Francisco at the conference, "he had a full smile ... maybe his life, his adventures in 40 years of political storms, have changed that".

== Subjects ==
Berger was known for taking a minimalist approach when drawing his subjects, just bringing a sketch block and a few pencils. Numerous world leaders and important figures sat for him, including: Winston Churchill, Pope Pius XII, George II of Greece, Victor Emmanuel III, Edvard Beneš, Clement Attlee, Charles de Gaulle, Haile Selassie, Paul von Hindenburg, Andrei Gromyko, Carlos P. Romulo, John Foster Dulles, Luci Johnson, Queen Elizabeth II, Vyacheslav Molotov and Queen Wilhelmina.

External image via The Press of Atlantic City
- Caricatures of Dwight Eisenhower and Richard Nixon (Note: Nixon was Vice-President at the time in 1959)
- Dwight Eisenhower and Richard Nixon

The U.S. presidents who sat for him are: Calvin Coolidge, Herbert Hoover, Franklin D. Roosevelt, Harry Truman, Dwight D. Eisenhower, John F. Kennedy, Lyndon Johnson and Richard Nixon. In a conversation with American Art Magazine, Berger was asked to give his thoughts on the presidents he had drawn, and his remarks pertained to a common characteristic amongst them, their innate sense of humor: "FDR's was instant and bubbling; Coolidge took some time to warm up; Truman's was dry and to the point; Eisenhower's was precise and measured; Hoover's was hidden but evident; and Kennedy's natural, immediate, sharp, but good-natured". His portraits of all the presidents from Washington to Nixon are part of the permanent collection at the New Britain Museum of American Art. Each is made with one continuous line.

Berger also had 10 U.S. Supreme Court justices sit for him, which he donated to the Smithsonian Institution National Portrait Gallery. Those he sketched include: Felix Frankfurter, Abe Fortas, Potter Stewart, Earl Warren, Thurgood Marshall, John Marshall Harlan, Byron White, William J. Brennan Jr., William O. Douglas and Hugo Black.

Berger sketched many notable individuals from the fields of literature, poetry, acting and sports, including: Christopher Morley, Ralph Richardson, Robert Frost, Marcel Marceau, Gina Lollobrigida, Bernard Shaw, Charlie Chaplin, Maria Tallchief, Valeska Gert, Pablo Casals, Joe DiMaggio, Tallulah Bankhead, T. S. Eliot, Arturo Toscanini, Anna Pavlova, Helen Hayes, Marlene Dietrich, Jimmy Durante, Jane Russell, Clark Gable, Bette Davis, Vivien Leigh, Danny Kaye, Judy Garland and Bob Hope.

== Selected works ==
"Tip and Tap" (The Two Scotsmen}, 1933

His work appeared in Life Magazine, Look Magazine, The Saturday Review, The New York Times, the New York Herald Tribune, This Week, The Nation, The Illustrated London News and Le Figaro, among numerous other publications. He also produced posters and advertising for Shell, London Transport and the Post Office. A partial list of caricatures he contributed to The New York Times include: "Recipes for Notables (Add a Grain of Salt)", "Hitler and Chaplin at 54", "Hollywood Sketch Book", and "A Short History of Arturo Toscanini".

In 1933, he authored and illustrated his first book titled "Tip and Tap" (The Two Scotsmen}, published by Rudolf Mosse Buchverlag. Other books he authored and illustrated include: Aesop's Foibles, À la Carte: The Gourmet's Phantasmagoria in Fifty Cartoons, Famous Faces: Caricaturist's Scrapbook, My Victims: How to Caricature, I Love You, and The Presidents, From George Washington to the Present.

== Personal life ==
Berger married Aran (Anne) Varga, from Kispest, Hungary. They resided in Central Park South in Manhattan.

== See also ==
- List of caricaturists
- List of cartoonists
- List of editorial cartoonists
