= Joe Heller =

American cartoonist

Joe Heller (born August 17, 1954, in Oshkosh, Wisconsin) is an editorial cartoonist who distributes his cartoons to more than 300 newspapers through Heller Syndication. He cartooned for the Green Bay Press-Gazette from 1985 to 2013, when he was cut as part of a large round of layoffs by Gannett, owner of the Press-Gazette. Before he worked at the Press-Gazette, Heller was the cartoonist for the West Bend Daily News.

== Education ==
Heller graduated from the University of Wisconsin–Milwaukee in 1979 with a Bachelor of Fine Arts degree.

== Works ==
His work is regularly reprinted in USA Today, The New York Times, The Washington Post, Newsweek, and the Los Angeles Times. Heller placed his editorial cartoons into a collection in which he titled "Give 'em Heller". He has also taken part in drawing for exhibits in museums, numerous comic books, and children's books.

== Awards ==
- 8 Best of Gannett Awards
- 6 Milwaukee Press Clubs Awards
- 3 John Fischetti Editorial Cartoon Awards

== Organizations ==
- Heller is a member of the Association of American Editorial Cartoonists. He claims to have personally met both Garfield and Snoopy and calls them "class acts all the way."

== Family ==
Heller is married and has two daughters. Together they live in Green Bay, Wisconsin.
