= John Dooley Reigh =

John Dooley Reigh (c. 1851 – 25 February 1914) was an Irish cartoonist whose work generally supported Irish nationalism. He first emerged as an artist in his native Dublin. His cartoons were usually signed J.D. Reigh.

Reigh's work coincided with and celebrated the success of the Irish Parliamentary Party under Charles Stewart Parnell. Reigh's drawings were published in weekly magazines such as Zoz, United Ireland and The Nation, and were also sold individually as prints.

His own success rested on his ability to render news in a simple format to a receptive public. Using chromolithography allowed colour to be added, making his works more attractive and seen by buyers as modern products. Many of his works, particularly about the 1798 rebellion, are still reprinted as if they were drawn contemporaneously with the subject matter. Some of these are his versions of older paintings.

Many of Reigh's prints can be seen at the National Library of Ireland.

He moved to England, living in London and Manchester. He died in Manchester in 1914.

== Sources ==
- Lawrence W. McBride; "Nationalist Constructions of the 1798 Rebellion: The Political Illustrations of J. D. Reigh" (Éire-Ireland Vol. 34, No. 2)
