= Schrunk Township, North Dakota =

- Township
- Location within the state of North Dakota
- Coordinates: 47°17′53″N 100°25′55″W
- Country: United States
- State: North Dakota
- County: Dickey
- Consolidated: April 20, 2022

Area
  - Total: 34.38 sq mi (89.0 km^{2})
  - Land: 32.66 sq mi (84.6 km^{2})
  - Water: 1.72 sq mi (4.5 km^{2})
- Elevation: 1,939 ft (591 m)

Population (2020)
  - Total: 11
  - Density: 0.34/sq mi (0.13/km^{2})
- Time zone: UTC-6 (Central (CST))
  - Summer (DST): UTC-5 (CDT)
- ZIP codes: 58477 (Regan); 58494 (Wing)
- Area code: 701
- FIPS code: 38-71220
- GNIS feature ID: 1759345

Schrunk Township was a township in Burleigh County in the U.S. state of North Dakota. As of the 2000 census, its population was 26, but had increased to an estimated 71 by 2009.

== History ==
Schrunk Township was first listed as a school township during the 1910 Census, with a population of 120. It was named after brothers Charlie and George Schrunk, early settlers from Iowa who moved to the area in 1893. The first school was built in 1903. A second schoolhouse was constructed in 1908, and operated until 1957 when the school district was consolidated with nearby Wing.

It was later organized as a civil township under the name Summit, and reported a 1920 population of 131. By the time of the 1908 Census, the township had been renamed Schrunk.

On April 20, 2022, Schrunk Township was merged with Steiber Township to form Schrunk-Steiber Township.
