= Kai Maew =

A four-panel strip from Kai Maew, satirizing the government's amendment to the Computer Crime Act in December 2016.

Kai Maew (Thai: ไข่แมว, also spelled Khai Maew, RTGS: Khai Maeo, meaning 'cat egg' or 'cat balls' (as in the slang for 'testicles')) is a Thai satirical webcomic, published from 2016 to 2018 on its Facebook page, which used the alias cartooneggcat. The cartoon satirized Thai politics and current events, especially the military government that came to power in the 2014 Thai coup d'état. Launched in April 2016, it gained 330,000 "likes" over its first year, and had over 450,000 likes and followers when it was abruptly taken down on 18 January 2018.

Kai Maew was one of a handful of outlets producing humour content critical of the junta amidst an atmosphere of political repression. In 2017, Reuters described the page as being at the forefront of the trend, and it was named "Facebook page of the year" in an online vote organized by the political news site Prachatai.

Kai Maew's cartoons are wordless, using a number of distinctive caricatures to poke fun at various political personalities. These include regularly appearing figures such as junta leader/prime minister General Prayut Chan-o-cha and former prime minister Thaksin Shinawatra, as well as rotating figures from the news such as student-activist Netiwit Chotiphatphaisal and fugitive Red Bull heir Vorayuth Yoovidhya. One of its long-running gags was Jack Maew (the name given to Thaksin's caricature, a play on his political nickname and resemblance to Jack Ma) being the one pulling the strings behind everything.

The comic's creator, who worked anonymously, has said in interviews that he took inspiration from the work of Spanish cartoonist Joan Cornellà. Despite the nature of his work, he admitted to self-censorship on some topics due to fears of prosecution, and noted that Facebook has deleted some of his posts in response to user reports, despite them not violating any rules.

On 18 January 2018, Kai Maew's Facebook page abruptly became unavailable. It was unclear what the cause of the disappearance was. The comics later resumed on 16 February at a different Facebook page, Kai Maew X (alias cartooneggcatx).
