= Arts and Entertainment =

Arts and Entertainment may refer to:

- The arts and entertainment
- Arts and Entertainment (album), a 2009 album by Masta Ace and Ed O.G.
- A&E (TV network), an American television network
- Arts & Entertainment District, a neighborhood in Downtown Miami, Florida

== See also ==
- The Entertainment and Arts, a 1998 EP by Lifter Puller
