= Stewart McCrae (cartoonist) =

Australian cartoonist

Stewart McCrae (1919 – 5 June 2008) was an Australian cartoonist who contributed to the Brisbane Courier Mail newspaper and bulletin. For the Argus (Melbourne) he published the cartoon Nicky & Graham.
