= Khaldoon Gharaibeh =

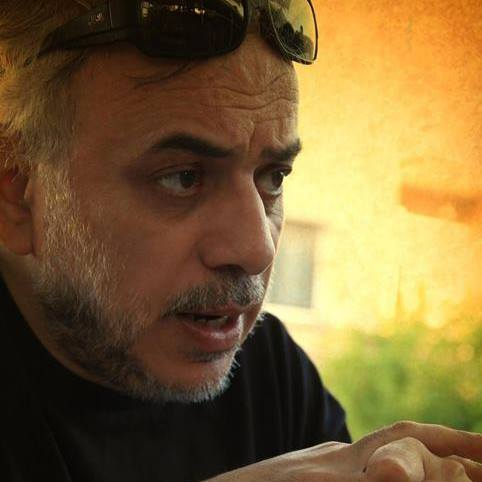
- Al Rai Newspaper
- Born: 17 October 1968 (age 57); Irbid, Amman, Jordan
- Occupations: Political cartoonist, artist

Khaldoon Fuad Gharaibeh (Arabic: خلدون غرايبة) (17 October 1968– in Amman, Jordan) is a Jordanian cartoonist and a caricature artist, .

== Memberships ==
- Consultancy Commission of the Arab Cartoon Encyclopedia, Damascus, Syria
- Judges panel of the Young Artist Competition (Jordanian Press Establishment), Amman, Jordan
- Judges panel of Hatem children's magazine, Amman, Jordan
- Judges panel of Naji Al Ali competition, Damascus, Syria

== Work ==
- Al Ra'i, Amman, Jordan, 2000–2005 and from 2006-Now
- Kuwaiti “Al Jareeda” Newspaper, Al Kuwait, Kuwait, 2007–2010
- “Al Rai Al Akhar” Lebanese Magazine, Beirut, Lebanon, 2006–2009
- Al Bayan, Dubai, UAE. 2005–2006
- Al-Arab al Yoam Daily, Amman, Jordan, 1997–2000
- Al Mashreq Al-Elami, of the Arabian International Journalism Studies Centre, Amman, Jordan, 1997–2002 (discontinued)
- Al-Muharrer weekly (Arabic and French editions, Paris, France, 1994-until the magazine stopped
- Shihan weekly, Amman, Jordan, 1993–2000
- Al Majd, Amman, Jordan, 1992–1994
- Akher Khabar, Amman, Jordan, 1992–1994
- Al Ufuq, Amman, Jordan, 1991 until the magazine stopped
- In addition to other Jordanian weeklies, including: Al Bilad, Al Mustakbal, Al Diar, Al Ahali, Al Jamaheer, Nida Al Watan, As well as other newspapers and magazines, such as, Lebanese Assafir and Al Nahar, Iranian Al Subh, and several websites such as: irancartoon, fotosay, cartoonbank, St-Just, Al Rai Daily Newspaper and official TV interviews

== Technical Manager ==
- Al-Mithaq Newspaper, Jordan, 1997–1998
- Al Muqatabas Al Eilami, 2000–2002

== Correspondent ==
- Correspondent for the Lebanese daily As-Safir, 1995–1997

== Published works ==
- Draw Human Rights for Me, a collection of cartoons of 58 international cartoonists, published in Switzerland by the UNESCO in 1998, on the occasion of the 50th anniversary of the Universal Declaration of Human Rights
- The Media and Freedom of Press, a collection of cartoons published by the Arab and World Center for Press Studies Amman, in cooperation with ARTICLE 19 Journalists Rights Group
- The Arab Encyclopedia of Cartoons, First Edition, Damascus 1999
- The Arab Encyclopedia of Cartoons, Second Edition, Damascus 2000
- Under Print Books
- Ramadi Ala Rasasi
- Iza ba'ad fe Majal
- Al Wuqof fe Al Haraka

== Other works ==
- Caricature works were used in a graduation research in Tunisia, University of Manuba, Institute of Journalism and News Sciences, supervised by Dr. Sabah Al Mahmoudi, 2003
- Participation with cartoons in children's movie "Maharim-Maharim" directed by Mohammad Malas and produced by Al Jazeera channel 2008.

== Personal exhibitions ==
- Yarmouk University, Irbid, 1994, 1995, 1996
- Unions & Professional Associations Centre, Amman & Irbid, 1996, 1998 and 1999
- Irbid National University, Irbid, 1997
- Press Club, Dubai, UAE 2005
- Istanbul, Turkey 2009
- Bari, Italy 2010

== Joint exhibitions ==
- Fuhais Festival 1996, with other Jordanian artists
- The Arab Cartoonist Exhibition Amman 1996, with Ali Farzat, Bahgouri, Hijazi, Bahgat Othman, Yousef Abdelky, Mustafa Hussain, Jalal Al Rifai, Abdul Hadi Al Shammaa and Abdulla Al Muharraki
- "No to Normalization" Exhibition, Sanna, Yemen 1996, with Yousef Abdelky, Khudair Al Humairi, Amro Saleem, Hijazi, Jumaa and Bahgat Othman
- Draw Human Rights For me, exhibition – Geneva, 1998 with 58 world artists
- The First International Forum For Caricature, Dubai, UAE 2000
- Saloon International Exhibition, Saint Just Le Martel, France 2001, 2002 and 2004
- Cartoon Exhibition, Tokyo, Japan 2003
- Holocaust Exhibition, Tehran Iran 2006
- Syrian Exhibition Fair, Damascus, Syria 2007
- From Port to Ports Exhibition, Bari, Italy 2010

== Awards ==
- Special Prize, Syrian Exhibition Fair, Competition entitled (The Play), Damascus, Syria 2007
- Special Prize, Syrian Exhibition Fair, Competition entitled (The Pens), Damascus, Syria 2008
- Bari Fair Prize, Bari, Italy 2010

== Design ==
- Company logos
- Book covers and posters
- Advertisement designs

== Personal Websites ==
gharaibehweb.com

Al Rai Newspaper

https://www.facebook.com/gharaibehweb/

Interview Jordan TV

Official Youtube Channel
