= Peter Schrank =

Political cartoonist

Peter Schrank (born 23 September 1952) is a political cartoonist whose work has appeared in the British, Irish and Swiss press. He was born in St Gallen, Switzerland.

Schrank's cartoons have featured in the UK's Independent on Sunday newspaper, The Economist magazine, Switzerland's Basler Zeitung, and Ireland's Sunday Business Post. More recently, Peter Schank's work regularly appears on The Economist and The Guardian, also The Times and The Sunday Times.

He attended the Basel Art School from 1973 to 1977 before moving to London in 1981. His first cartoon was published in October 1981 by Time Out magazine.
