= Gogu Neagoe =

Romanian cartoonist

Gogu Neagoe is a Romanian cartoonist and a member of the Romanian Association of Professional Caricature since 2006, and since 2008 has been a member of the International Association of Fine Arts in Germany UNESCO. He has participated in national and international painting and caricature festivals, and his works are in private collections in Romania and abroad.

The artist's cartoons are exhibited in art museums in Australia, USA, Los Angeles, Iran, France, Italy, Germany, China, Japan, Bulgaria, Belgium, Greece.

In 2013, the cartoonist donated 4 painted works, worth 15,000 euros, to a charity event for children with health problems and the poor.

In 2004, Neagoe entered the Guinness World Records for the first time by doing 131 caricatures through the phone, without seeing the subject.
