= J. The Jewish News of Northern California =

Weekly newspaper in Northern California, US

- Type: Biweekly newspaper
- Format: website, newsletters, print
- Owner: 501c3 nonprofit
- Founder(s): Rabbi Jacob Voorsanger; Abraham W. Voorsanger
- Publisher: Jo Ellen Green Kaiser
- Editor: Chanan Tigay
- Managing editor: Sue Barnett
- News editor: Gabe Stutman
- Founded: November 1895
- Language: English
- Headquarters: San Francisco, California, United States
- Circulation: 15,000 (as of 2025)
- ISSN: 2574-5549
- OCLC number: 55488896
- Website: jweekly.com
- Free online archives: cdnc.ucr.edu (1895-2024)

J. The Jewish News of Northern California, is the only news outlet serving the Jewish population of Northern California. It is owned and operated by a 501c3 nonprofit, San Francisco Jewish Community Publications Inc. It is based in San Francisco, California. J. publishes six days per week on jweekly.com, produces daily and weekly email newsletters, runs social media including Instagram, and publishes a biweekly print tabloid.

The J. "covers the full range of what it means to be Jewish today – from the arts to religion, food, lifecycle events and news of our local, national and global communities."

== History ==
On November 22, 1895, Rabbi Jacob Voorsanger published the first edition of The Emanu-El, which was named after Congregation Emanu-El. Voorsanger started the paper after leaving the Jewish Progress and intended his publication to be for all Jews on the West Coast of the United States. He served as editor, writing editorials and book reviews, and published the paper until his death in 1908. His brother and fellow co-founder Abraham W. Voorsanger published the paper until his death in 1930.

Attorney Sol Silverman then took over as editor a year later. In 1932, Silverman acquired rival paper Jewish Journal from Raymond Dannenbaum who wanted to retire and absorbed it into Emanu-El. The combined paper then moved to a larger space at Mills Tower. In 1945, of group of local investors acquired the paper and hired San Francisco Call Bulletin editor Eugene B. Block to manage it. On Jan 1. 1946, the paper was named to the Jewish Community Bulletin.

In 1969, the paper was redesigned and renamed to the San Francisco Jewish Bulletin. At that time Block retired, and was succeeded by Geoffrey Fisher. In 1982, the Bulletin merged with the Jewish Observer of Oakland, and the combined total circulation was 22,000. Marc S. Klein became publisher two years later. The paper was later called the Northern California Jewish Bulletin followed by the Jewish Bulletin of Northern California. In 2003, the paper was turned into a magazine and renamed to j. the Jewish News Weekly of Northern California. In 2011, Klein retired, and the word "weekly" was dropped from the title in 2017.

== See also ==
- List of Jewish newspapers in the United States
