= Indian Institute of Cartoonists =

Indian professional organizations

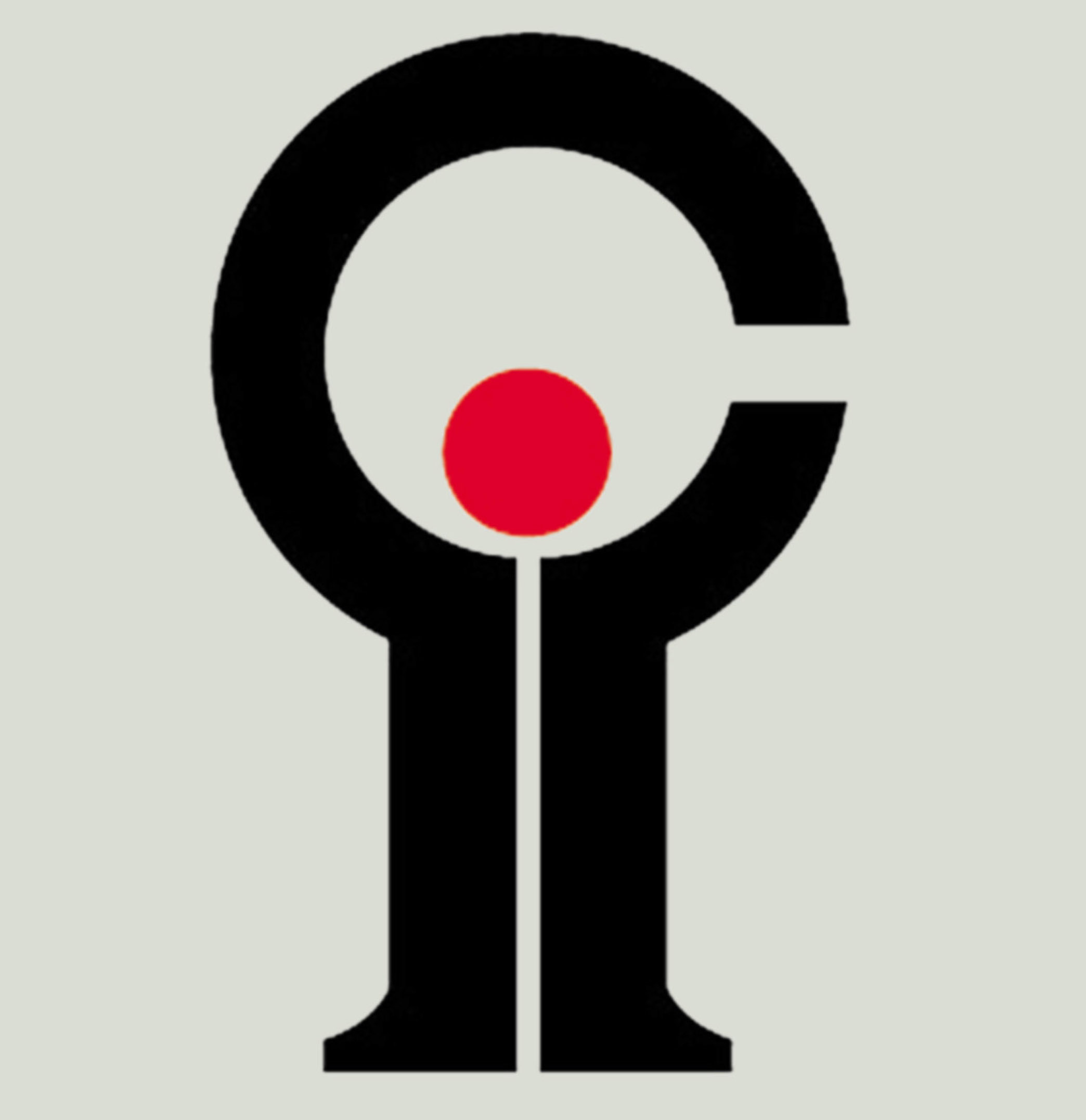
- Abbreviation: IIC
- Founded: 8 June 2001 (25 years ago)
- Founder: V. G. Narendra
- Type: Not for Profit - Registered Trust
- Purpose: Promoting the art of cartooning in India
- Headquarters: 1, Midford Garden, Off M G Road, Bengaluru 560001
- Location(s): Bengaluru, India; 12°58'18.9"N 77°37'05.1"E
- Method: Cartoon workshop, annual publication, library and every month new cartoon exhibitions at IIC's Indian Cartoon Gallery
- Key people: Ashok Kheny (Chairman)
- Publication: CartoonistsIndia Annual Editor: Bibek Sengupta
- Website: www.cartoonistsindia.org

The Indian Institute of Cartoonists (IIC) is an organisation based in Bangalore that serves to promote and preserve cartooning and cartoonists in India. Founded in 2001, the institute hosts the Indian Cartoon Gallery with rotating exhibits focusing on different artists. It has organised more than one hundred exhibitions of cartoons.

== Founders and Brief History ==
IIC was registered as a non profitable organization under Trust act in 2001 to promote the art of cartooning in India with B. V. Ramamurthy as the Chair person, V. G. Narendra as the Managing Trustee and B.G. Gujjarappa as a member Trustee. The chief patron as Mario Miranda. Then Governor of Karnataka, V. S. Ramadevi inaugurated the IIC at Bangalore on 8 June 2001. Seven leading cartoonists were felicitated with Lifetime Achievement Award. Mario Miranda, Pran, S.D. Padnis, Bapu, Gopulu, Yesudasan and S. K. Nadig. More than 100 cartoonists from across the country had participated in the function. R. K. Laxman was felicitated with Lifetime achievement Award in February 2002 in another function.

=== The Board of Trustees ===
(IIC as in May 2017)

| Honorary Chairman | Ashok Kheny |
| Advisor | Manjunath Nayaker |
| Managing Trustee | V. G. Narendra |
| Financial Advisor | B. G. Gujjarappa |
| Member Trustees | G. S. Naganath and G. S. Krishnan |
| National Adviser Committee | Unny, Shekhar Gurera, Suresh Sawant, Syam Mohan, Keshav, Venkataraghavan, Mohana Chandran, E P Peter and Bibek Sengupta |
| Doner Members | Family of Late Ranga, Family of Late Maya (Amarnath Kamath) and Melvin Mathew |

=== Indian Cartoon Gallery ===
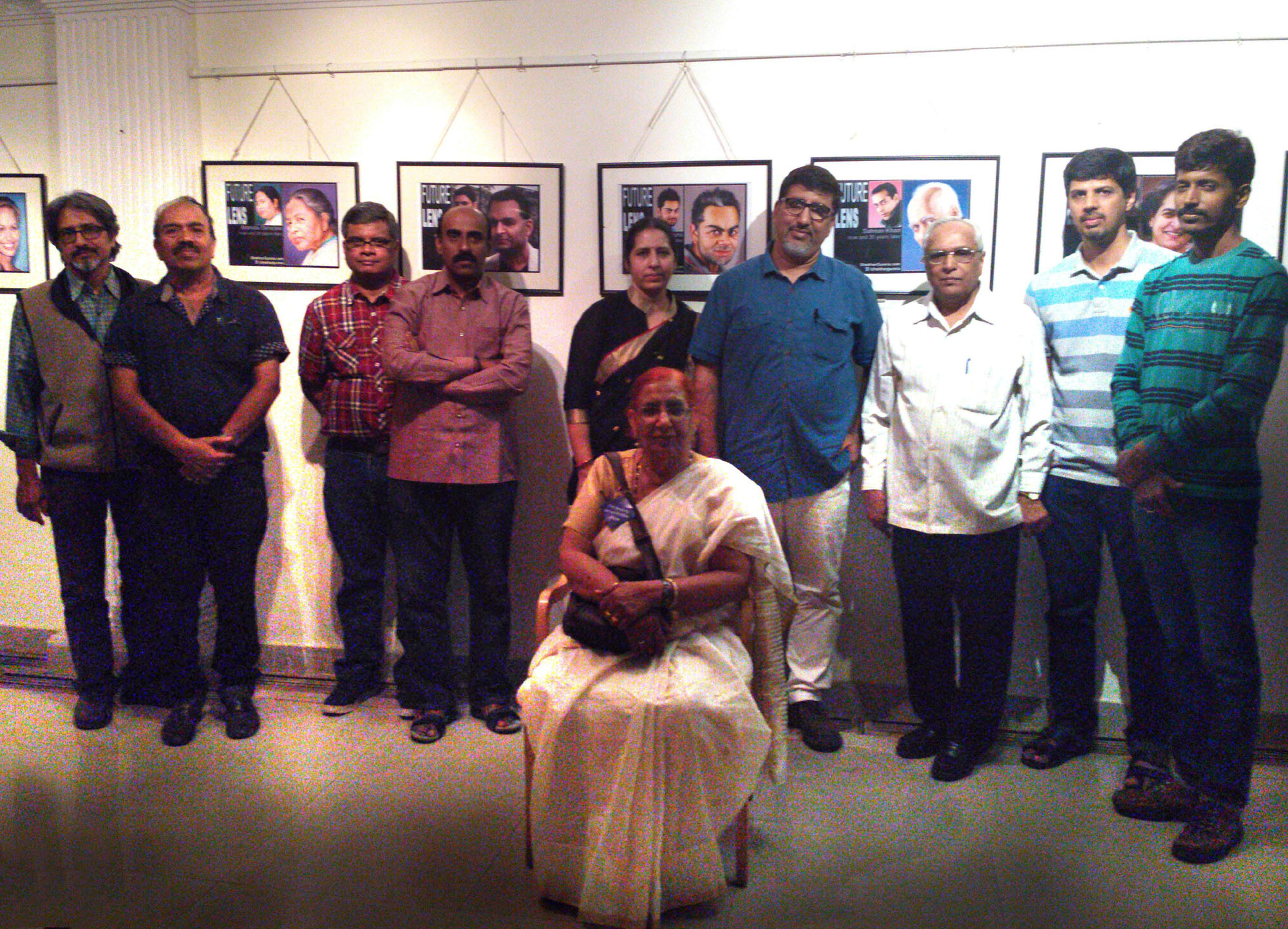
Bangalore Cartoonists from various media houses at the Cartoon Exhibition (7–28 January 2017) by Shekhar Gurera.

After the death of IIC Chairman B. V. Ramamurthy, Ashok Kheny (M.D. Nandi Infrastructure Corridor Enterprise) stepped forward as the Honorary Chairman of the institute. He allocated 5000 square feet of space in the heart of Bangalore for the establishment of the Indian Cartoon Gallery, the first of its kind in India. The premises include a 2,000 sq. ft. gallery, a conference hall and a space for a library. Since then, the gallery has hosted monthly exhibitions featuring both professional and amateur cartoonists. Later on, the gallery was awarded by the Limca Book of Records.

== Exhibitions held at the Indian Cartoon Gallery ==
=== Exhibitions : 2007 ===
| Date | Cartoonist/s | Inaugurated by |
|---|---|---|
| 16 Aug 2007 | B. V. Ramamurthy, V. G. Narendra and B.G. Gujjarappa | T. N. Chaturvedi |
| 18 Oct 2007 | S.K. Nadig | V.N. Subbarao (Chairman, Karnataka Media Academy) |

=== Exhibitions : 2008 ===
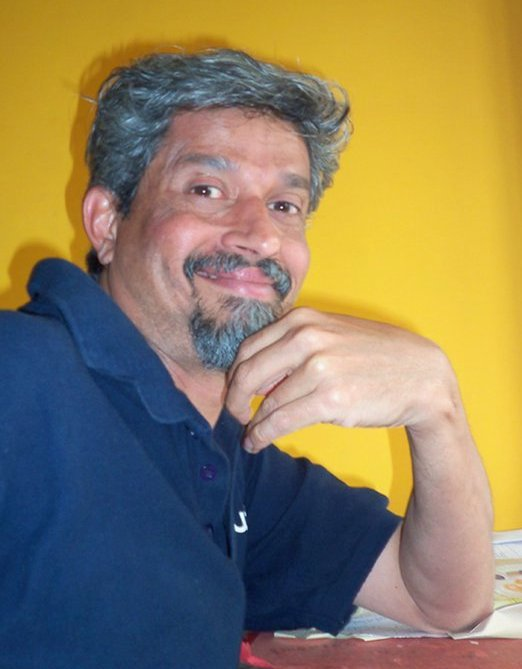
Prakash Shetty, 5 Sept 2008

| Date | Cartoonist/s | Inaugurated by |
|---|---|---|
| 23 Jan 2008 | Vikas Gupta | G.R. Gopinath |
| 6 Feb 2008 | Ranjan Somaiah | M.N. Venkatachalaiah |
| 7 Mar 2008 | Ranga (Ranganath) | R.K. Misra (Winner of Lead India Contest) |
| 4 Apr 2008 | Shridhar Hunch | G. Narayana, chairman, Karnataka Janapada Academy |
| 25 Apr 2008 | Alok Nirantar | T. Prabhakar, President, Karnataka Chitrakala Parishat. |
| 19 May 2008 | Maya Kamath | Girish Karnad |
| 14 Jun 2008 | B.V. Panduranga Rao | Jagadish Shettar |
| 7 Jul 2008 | V. Gopal | M.S. Narasimha Murthy (Humour Writer) |
| 24 Jul 2008 | S. D. Phadnis | U. R. Ananthamurthy |
| 11 Aug 2008 | Group show of 12 Cartoonists | Mahesh Joshi, Sr. Director, Doordarshan, Bangalore. |
| 5 Sept 2008 | Prakash Shetty | S.G. Vasudev, Eminent Artist |
| 13 Oct 2008 | Prabhakar Rao Bail | H.S. Venkatesh Murthy (Noted Poet) |
| 4 Nov 2008 | Rajesh Pujar | Nagathihalli Chandrashekhar |
| 4 Dec 2008 | S.K. Nadig | Babu Krishnamurthy, (Editor, Karmaveera) |
| 22 Dec 2008 | G.Y. Hublikar | D.P. Parameshwar, Chairman, Karnataka Media Academy |

=== Exhibitions : 2009 ===
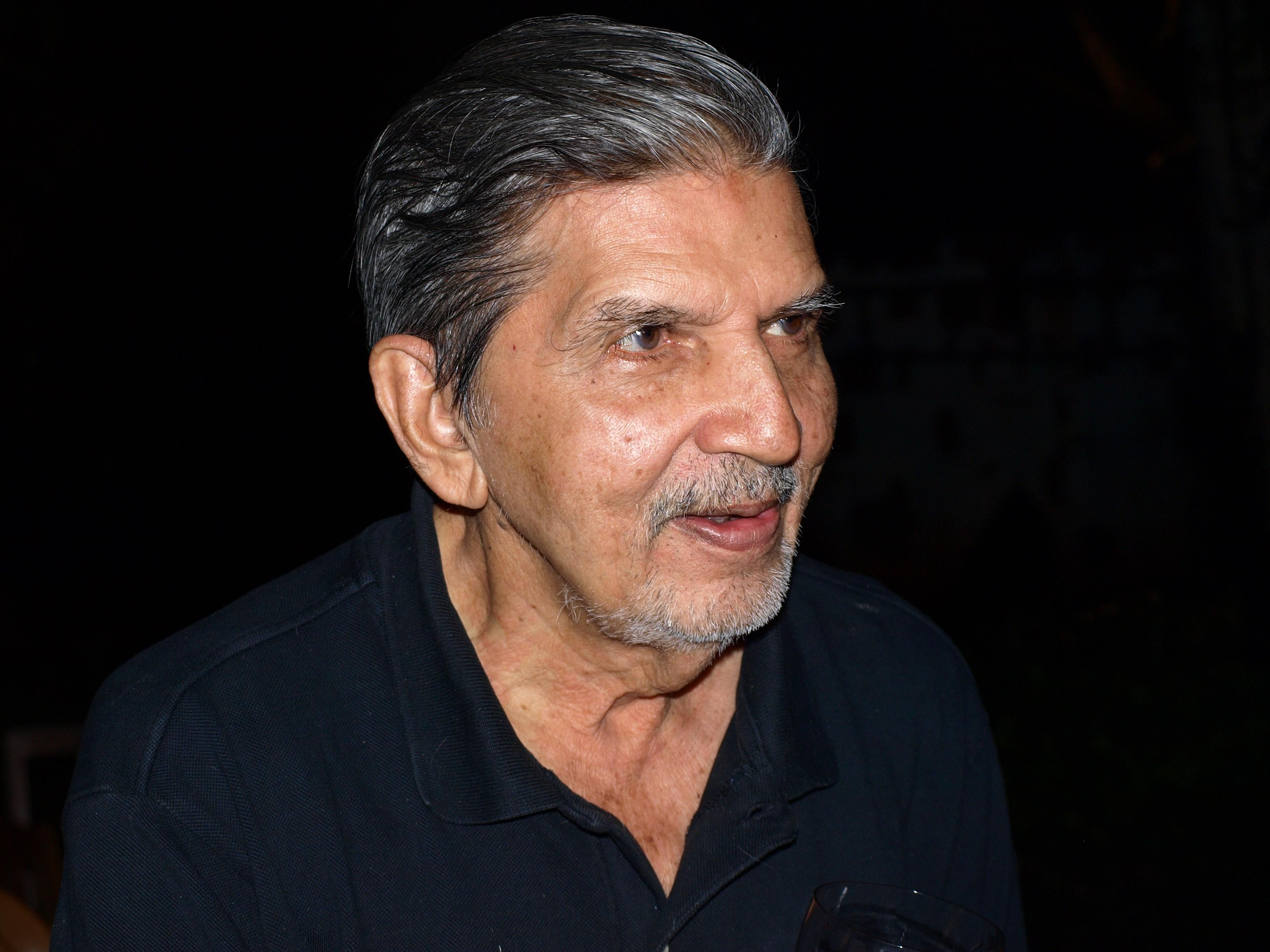
Mario Miranda, 3 Oct 2009

| Date | Cartoonist/s | Inaugurated by |
|---|---|---|
| 7 Jan 2009 | David Low | Chris Gibson, Director, British Council, Chennai |
| 6 Feb 2009 | R. K. Laxman | Jayaramaraje Urs |
| 11 Mar 2009 | K.R. Swamy | Girish Kasaravalli |
| 6 Apr 2009 | G.S. Naganath | V. Manohar |
| 25 Apr 2009 | Gireesh Vengara | Balan Nambiar |
| 20 Jun 2009 | Subhani | M.B. Jayaram |
| 8 Jul 2009 | MKMA - 2008 | Girish Karnad |
| 1 Aug 2009 | Shankar | Sharad V. Dravid & Pushpa Dravid |
| 5 Sept 2009 | Keshav | Justice N. Santosh Hegde |
| 3 Oct 2009 | Mario Miranda | Xerxes Desai |
| 31 Oct 2009 | K.N. Balraj | Arjun Sajnani |
| 19 Nov 2009 | V.R.C. Shekar | Dr. Jaimala |
| 2 Dec 2009 | Yathish and Yogish Shettigar | Anant Nag |
| 26 Dec 2009 | Janardhana Swamy | Shivamurthy Swamiji |

=== Exhibitions : 2010 ===
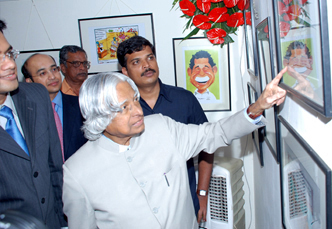
Dr Kalam visited the Indian Cartoon Gallery to inaugurate the exhibition of the cartoons by Shreyas Navare on January 10, 2010

| Date | Cartoonist/s | Inaugurated by |
|---|---|---|
| 10 Jan 2010 | Shreyas Navare | Dr. A. P. J. Abdul Kalam |
| 15 Feb 2010 | M.R. Rajamaran | R.H. Kulkarni. |
| 5 Mar 2010 | Cartoons for Climate (by British Council) | Krishna Palemar (Government of Karnataka) |
| 20 Mar 2010 | Sringeri Brothers | Jayanth Kaikini |
| 10 Apr 2010 | Nirmish Thaker | Girish Karnad |
| 6 May 2010 | Satish Acharya | Arundhati Nag |
| 27 May 2010 | Sumanta Baruah | U.R. Rao |
| 18 Jun 2010 | MKMA-2009 | C.R. Simha |
| 10 Jul 2010 | Tadao Kagaya | Masayuki Tsuchikawa |
| 29 Jul 2010 | Bharat Jagatap | M.B. Patil |
| 14 Aug 2010 | Vijay Narain Seth (Vins) | Dilip Thakore |
| 4 Sept 2010 | Jayarama Udupa | Dr. Nalluru Prasad |
| 27 Sept 2010 | Shyam Mohan | Dr. Radha Krishna Raju |
| 18 Oct 2010 | Prabhakar Wairkar | Dr. M.S. Thimmappa |
| 8 Nov 2010 | Satish Yellapur and M.C. Chethan | Mukhyamanthri Chandru |
| 29 Nov 2010 | Prabhakar Bhatlekar | D.K. Chowta |
| 18 Dec 2010 | Shankar Pamarthy | Chiranjeev Singh |

=== Exhibitions : 2011 ===
| Date | Cartoonist/s | Inaugurated by |
|---|---|---|
| 17 Jan 2011 | Golden Jubilee Exhibition | Janardhana Swamy |
| 16 Feb 2011 | John Chandran | V. Manohar |
| 26 Feb 2011 | Abu Abraham | Prof. N.S. Ramaswamy |
| 19 Mar 2011 | Surendra | G.M. Belagali |
| 16 April 2011 | Shijo Varghese | Sudhakar Rao |
| 30 April 2011 | B.G. Gujjarappa | B.S. Raghuram |
| 11 June 2011 | MKMA – 2010 | S.G. Vasudev |
| 9 July 2011 | Melvin Mathew | B.S. Kumar |
| 6 Aug 2011 | Rasheed Kappan | Sister Jean Bangalore's Mother Teresa |
| 26 Nov 2011 | Shekar Kambalapally | Sobha Nambisan |
| 17 Dec 2011 | Aswini Kumar Rath and Abani Kumar Rath | Harish J. Padmanabha |

=== Exhibitions : 2012 ===
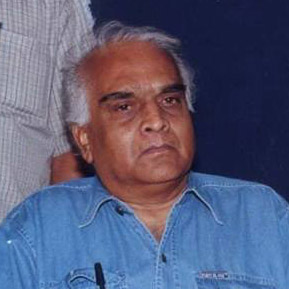
B. V. Ramamurthy, June 30-July 20, 2012

| Date | Cartoonist/s | Inaugurated by |
|---|---|---|
| 7 Jan 2012 | Narsim | G.K. Sathya |
| 30 Jan 2012 | T.F. Hadimani | Chandrashekar Kambar |
| 8 Feb 2012 | R. K. Laxman's Unpublished Doodles | M.N. Venkatachalaiah, Girish Karnad |
| 17 Mar 2012 | Jagadish Kunte | Chiranjeev Singh |
| 9 April 2012 | Best of Ranga | ... |
| 28 April 2012 | Rebecca Taylor | M.P. Ganesh |
| 19 May 2012 | Shijo Varghese | Sarath |
| 9 June 2012 | MAYA JAAL : by Maya Kamath | Shangon Das Gupta |
| 30 June 2012 | World of Ramamurthy | K.N. Harikumar |
| 21 July 2012 | Balraj K.N. | Prem Koshy |
| 13 Aug 2012 | Smiling Line : Mega Cartoon Exhibition | H. R. Bhardwaj |
| 8 Sept 2012 | Manohar Acharya | Chandranath Acharya |
| 1 Oct 2012 | Laugh with Phadnis | ... |
| 20 Oct 2012 | Cabodils of Lines : Biswajit Balasubramanian | S.G. Vasudev |
| 17 Nov 2012 | Kushal Bhattacharya | H.N. Suresh |
| 4 Dec 2012 | MAAC-2012 | Madhuri Upadhyay |
| 24 Dec 2012 | Shankar's Cartoons | ... |

=== Exhibitions : 2013 ===
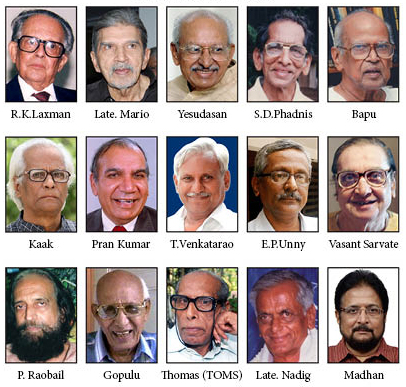
Apart from the exhibition Famous Fifteen, IIC also felicitated these 15 leading cartoonists with Lifetime Achievement Awards for the excellency in cartooning.

| Date | Cartoonist/s | Inaugurated by |
|---|---|---|
| 19 Jan 2013 | Mario's Karnataka | Basavaraj |
| 16 Feb 2013 | Suresh Sawant | R. Sreedhar |
| 9 Mar 2013 | B.V. Satyamurty | B.R. Chavali |
| 6 Apr 2013 | Parjaya Sau | Paul Fernandes |
| 8 May 2013 | Uday Vitla | V. Manohar |
| 8 Jun 2013 | MKMA-2012 | Girish Karnad |
| 6 Jul 2013 | Between the Lines by Prashant Kulkarni | Prabhakar Raobail |
| 27 Jul 2013 | Rama Baana : Ramadhyani | H.N. Ananda |
| 17 Aug 2013 | Famous Fifteen | Tadao Kagaya (Japanese Cartoonist) |
| 7 Sept 2013 | MAAC- 2013 | Praveen Kumar |
| 21 Oct 2013 | Best of R. K. Laxman | ... |
| 12 Oct 2013 | The Political Pickle : Shreyas Navare | Ajitha G.S. |
| 9 Nov 2013 | Suraj ESKAY Sriram | Athmaram N. Gangaram |
| 7 Dec 2013 | Music Sketches by Keshav | M.R.V.Prasad |
| 28 Dec 2013 | Sai Swaroop | Appajayya |

=== Exhibitions : 2014 ===
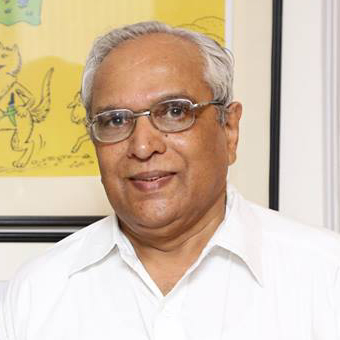
V. G. Narendra, 1 Mar 2014

| Date | Cartoonist/s | Inaugurated by |
|---|---|---|
| 18 Jan 2014 | Hemant Morparia | Sudha Pillai, Editor, Bangalore Mirror |
| 8 Feb 2014 | Comics by Pran | ... |
| 1 Mar 2014 | V. G. Narendra | ... |
| 22 Mar 2014 | Swinging in the 1970s : Paul Fernandes | Ponnappa Subbaiah |
| 12 Apr 2014 | Run up to the Election-2014 : Ranjan Somaiah | Chiranjeev Singh |
| 3 May 2014 | International Cartoons | Dr. R.H. Kulkarni |
| 24 May 2014 | Break the Taboo about Toilets and Sanitation | ... |
| 14 Jun 2014 | 100th Cartoon Exhibition | H.S. Balram, Director, Asianet |
| 13th Sept 2014 | Wild Life the Toony Way : Rohan Chakravarthy | ... |
| 6 Oct 2014 | Remembering Vins, Pran & Bapu | ... |
| 27 Oct 2014 | Faces : R. K. Laxman's Caricatures | ... |
| 17 Nov 2014 | Alok Nirantar | Ramachandra Guha |
| 6 Dec 2014 | Edua Szucs (Hungarian lady cartoonist) | Chiranjeev Singh |
| 27 Dec 2014 | Frederick Joss, London | S.G. Vasudev |

=== Exhibitions : 2015 ===
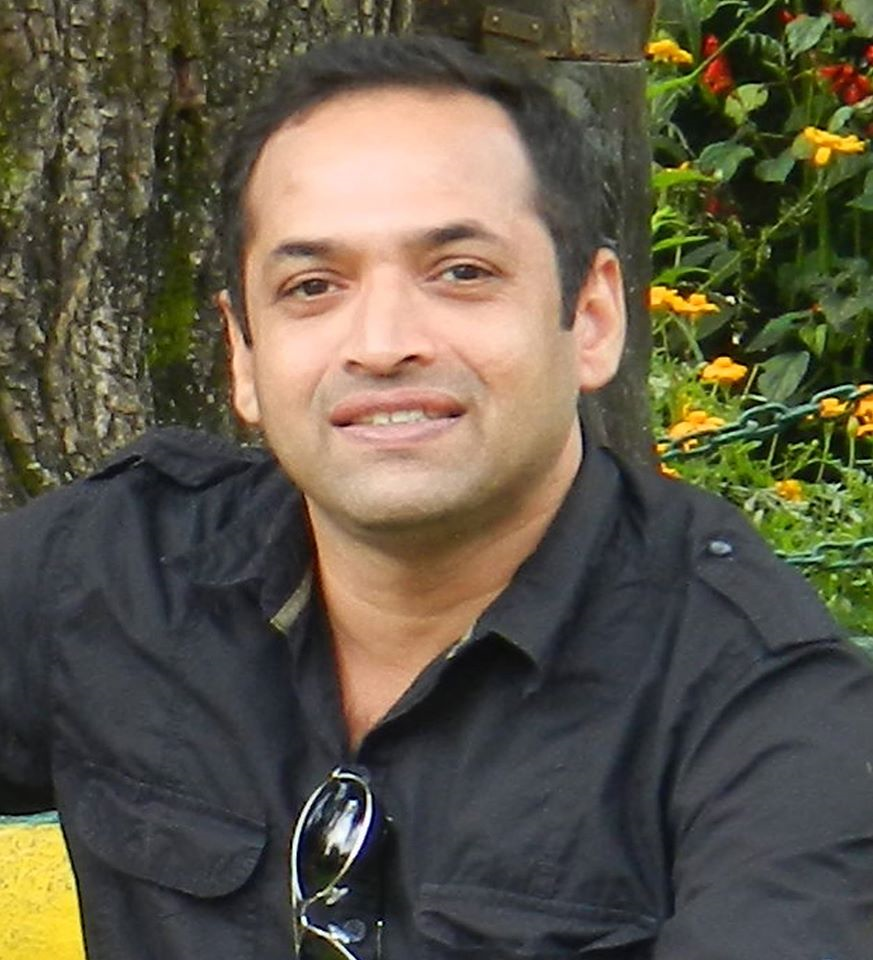
Satish Acharya, 31 Jan 2015

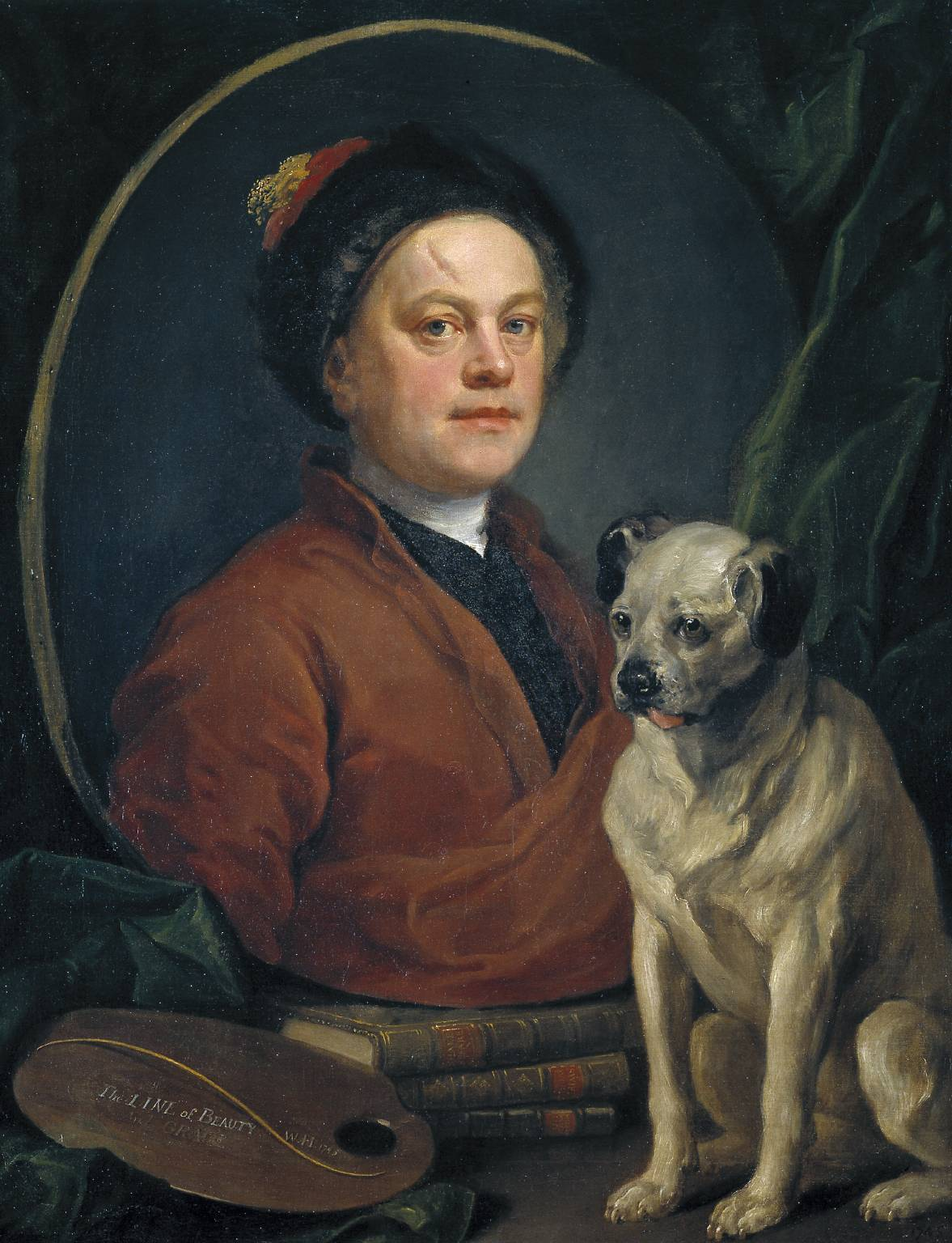
William Hogarth, 1 July 2015

| Date | Cartoonist/s | Inaugurated by |
|---|---|---|
| 31 Jan 2015 | Satish Acharya | Raobail |
| 22 Feb 2015 | Pickels & Lota by Goda Anirudh Raghvan | M N Venkatachaliah, N. Murali |
| 14 Mar 2015 | Sanket Gurudatta | M.A. Ponnappa, Chairman Karnataka Media Academy |
| 6 Apr 2015 | Your Autograph Please : Caricatures by Ranga | ... |
| 25 Apr 2015 | Smile with Melvin Mathew (India born US Cartoonist) | ... |
| 16 May 2015 | MKMA-2014 (Foreign Cartoons) | Prof. S Settar |
| 3 June 2015 | MKMA-2014 (Indian Cartoons) | Dr. H N Suresh, Director, Bharatiya Vidya Bhavana |
| 1 July 2015 | London-250 Years Ago : William Hogarth | ... |
| 5 Aug 2015 | Pocket cartoons of Mario Miranda | ... |
| 5 Sep 2015 | Selected works of S.D. Phadnis | ... |
| 31 Oct 2015 | Cartoons Karnataka 2015 | M. Shivakumar, Editor, Aparanji |
| 21 Nov 2015 | Caricatures India (Selected work) | ... |
| 10 Dec 2015 | Funtoons : Vldimir Kazanevski, Ukraine | ... |

=== Exhibitions : 2016 ===
| Date | Cartoonist/s | Inaugurated by |
|---|---|---|
| 2 Jan 2016 | Vakra Kirana by Kantesh M. Badiger | P. Rajendra |
| 23 Jan 2016 | START-UP R. K. Laxman from Koravanji | Usha Srinivas Laxman, M. Shivakumar, Beluru Ramamurthy |
| 13 Feb 2016 | Sukumar & Mohanachandran | Vasant Kulkarni |
| 5 Mar 2016 | WOMAN'S RIGHTS International Cartoon Contest by Toons Mag, Norway | Aruna C. Newton |
| 26 Mar 2016 | REFUGEES cartoon exhibition Organisor: Kimse Yak Mu, Turkey | Chiranjeev Singh, Vedat Oruc |
| 24 Apr 2016 | S.V. Padmanabha | Sugata Srinivasaraju |
| 4 Jun 2016 | 9th Anniversary of IIC : 125th cartoon exhibition | U.V. Vasantha Rao, Ritu Gairola Khanduri |
| 9 July 2016 | Sir David Low | ... |
| 6 Aug 2016 | Karnataka as seen by Mario | ... |
| 3 Sept 2016 | Nirmish Thaker (Jnanapith Awardee) | Chandrashekhar Kambara (Jnanapith Awardee) |
| 15 Oct 2016 | Unpublished R.K. Laxman | ... |
| 12 Nov 2016 | Smile with Nadig | ... |
| 10 Dec 2016 | World of Raobail | ... |

=== Exhibitions : 2017 ===
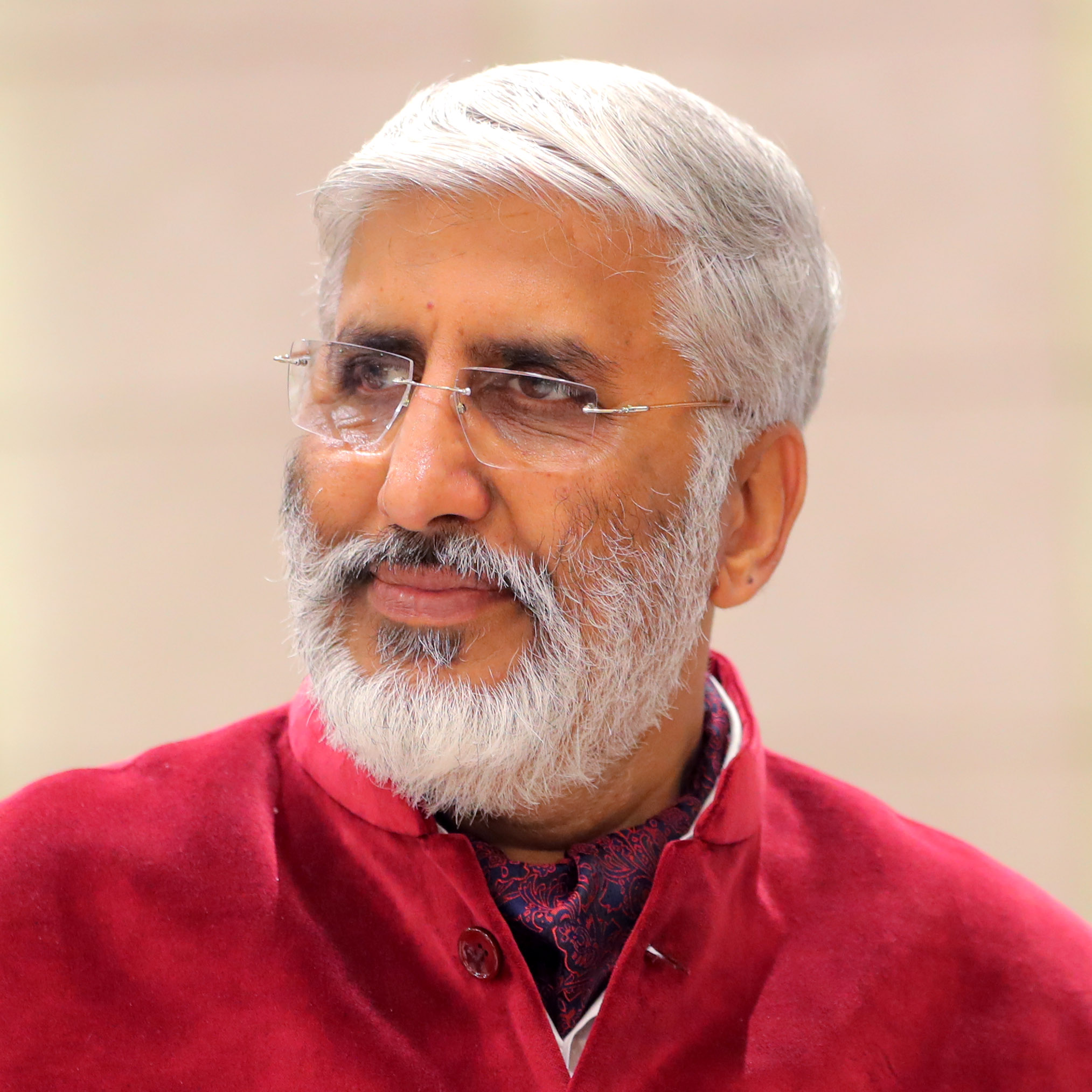
Shekhar Gurera, 7-28 Jan 2017

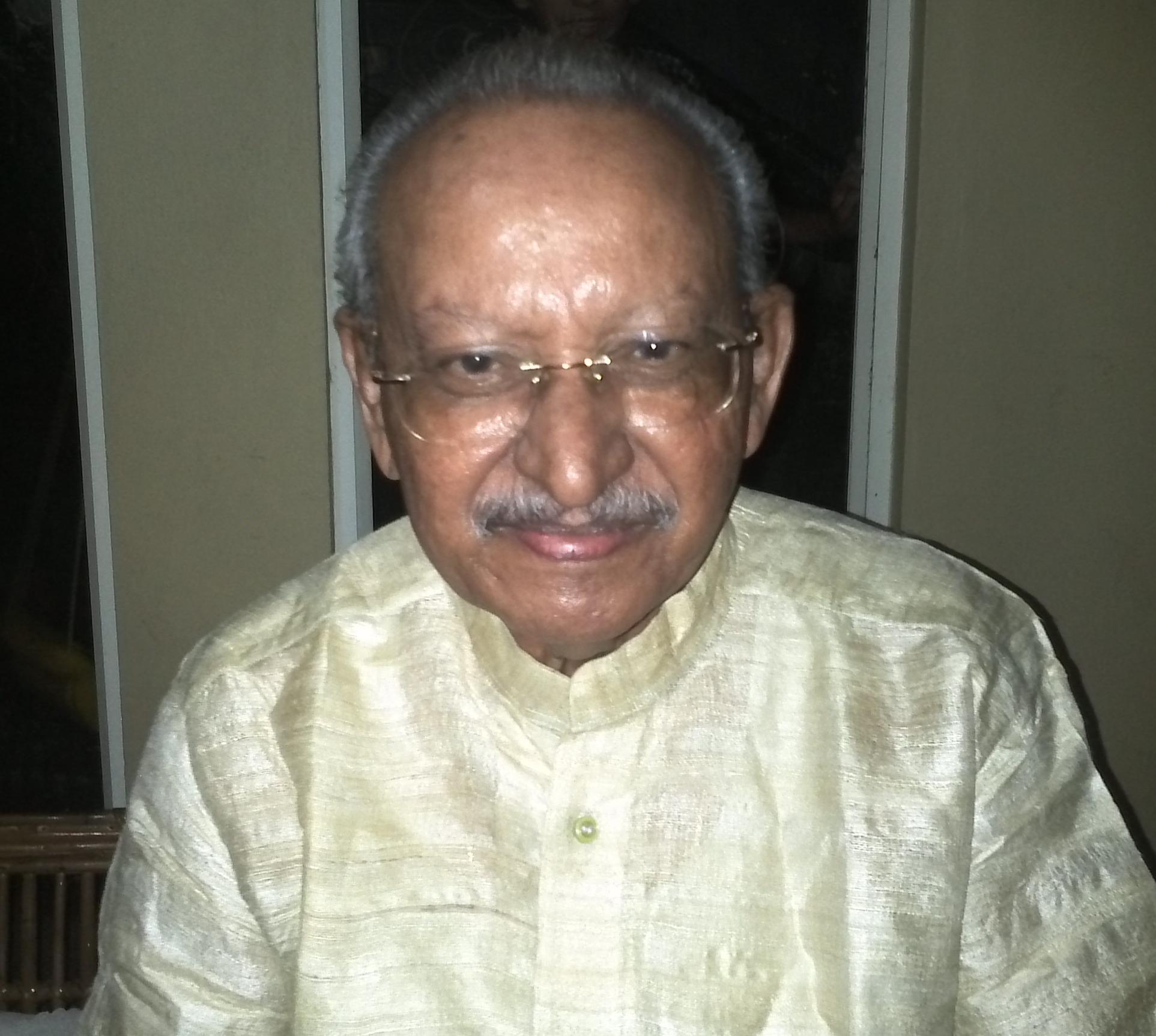
Yesudasan, Apr 8-22, 2017

| Duration Date | Cartoonist/s | Inaugurated by |
|---|---|---|
| 07-28 Jan 2017 | Cartoons and Future Lens by Shekhar Gurera | Parvati Gurera |
| 4-25 Feb 2017 | World of B. V. Ramamurthy | ... |
| Mar 11 - Apr 1, 2017 | James Vaz | Shivaram |
| Apr 8-22, 2017 | Yesudasan | ... |
| Apr 29 - May 20, 2017 | Freedom of Expression: International Cartoons by Toons Mag | Dr Satyabhama Badhreenath |
| May 27 - Jun 10, 2017 | Smitha Bhandare Kamat | Dr Deepti Navaratna |
| Jun 14 - Jul 15, 2017 | 10th Anniversary of IIC; MKMA-2016 (Indian and Foreign) | A Kheny, G Karnad, S G Vasudev, A Kamath, Keshav |
| Sept 9-30, 2017 | Tuktuk's World by Shreyas Navare | ... |
| 28 Oct- Nov 18, 2017 | Telugu Cartoonotsavam by Heartoonists (Telugu Cartoonists) | Dr Satyabhama Badhreenath, Dr Jayadev Babu |

=== Exhibitions : 2018 ===
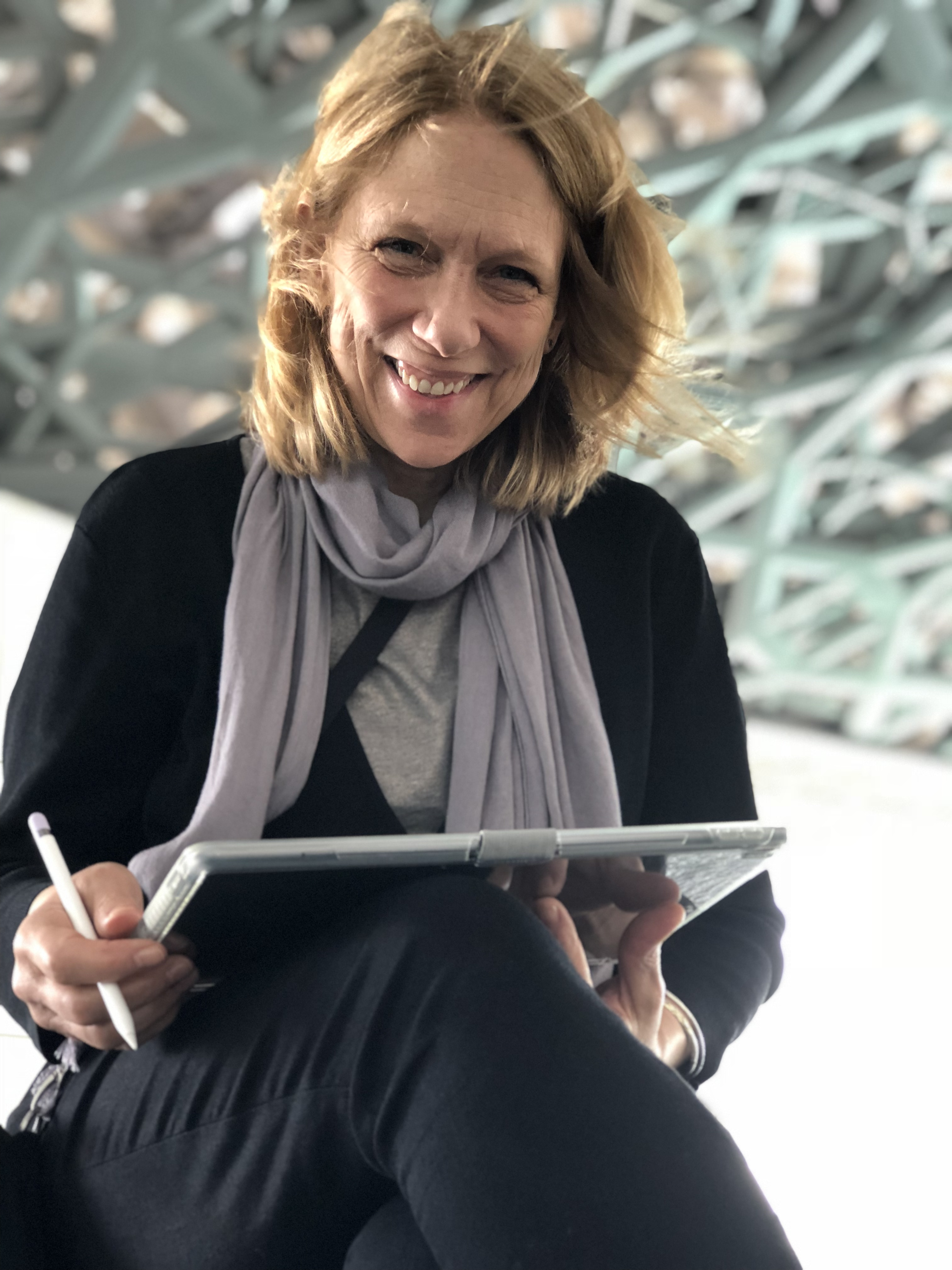
Liza Donnelly, Apr 7-28, 2018

| Duration Date | Cartoonist/s | Inaugurated by |
|---|---|---|
| 6-27 Jan 2018 | Liu Quiang (Chinese Cartoonist) | ... |
| 9 Mar 2018 | My Times My View (A collection of cartoons by V G Narendra, Published in Shankar's Weekly) | Ravi Hegde (Chief Editor: Kannada Prabha) |
| 9-30 Mar 2018 | Late Kanneppadi Ramakrishna (Raghu) (Apr 29, 1925-Jul 23, 2000) | ... |
| 7-28 Apr 2018 | Liza Donnelly (American Cartoonist) | ... |
| 5–26 May 2018 | Foreign Cartoons (MKMA-2017) | Balan Nambiar, Amarnath Kamath |
| 2-30 Jun 2018 | 150th Exhibition : Indian Cartoons (MKMA-2017) | Tahir Bagasrawala |
| 7-28 Jul 2018 | Hazards of Plastic | Cartoon Watch |
| 22 Aug-1 Sep 2018 | Exhibition of Cartoons | Karnataka Cartoonists Association |
| 8-22 Sep 2018 | Cartoons and Caricaures by Mrityunjay Chiluveru | ... |
| 6-20 Oct 2018 | Pulitzer Prize winner, Signe Wilkinson | Dr. V A Sastry |
| 3-23 Nov 2018 | 'Bankartoons' exhibition by H. S. Vishwanath | Harish J Padmanabha |
| 1-15 Dec 2018 | Cartoons by H S Vishwanath | ... |

=== Exhibitions : 2019 ===
| Duration Date | Cartoonist/s | Inaugurated by |
|---|---|---|
| 5-25 Jan 2019 | Exhibition of caricatures by Sparsh Dhaharwal | ... |
| 5-23 Mar 2019 | PANDUTOONS by B V Panduranga Rao | K R Swamy |
| 7-20 Apr 2019 | As It Is by Bibek Sengupta | Chiranjeev Singh |
| 4–18 May 2019 | Paresh Nath (Cartoonist : Khaleej Times) | Ramakrishna Upadhya |
| 1-22 Jun 2019 | Foreign Cartoons (MKMA 2018) | P D Shenoy |
| 6-26 Jul 2019 | Indian Cartoons (MKMA 2018) | Sudhakar Rao, IAS (Retd.) |
| 3-23 Aug 2019 | ECOTISM by Ashvini Menon | Dr A N Yellappa Reddy |
| 24 Aug -20 Sep 2019 | "Safe Drive Save Life" (International Cartoons) | In association with Fahad Mir Foundation, Buntoon Club and Toons Mag |
| 14-28 Sep 2019 | S D Phadnis | ... |
| 12-24 Oct 2019 | Luc Descheemaeker (O-SEKOER) | ... |
| 9-24 Nov 2019 | Y S Nanjunda Swamy | B G Gujjarappa |
| 14-28 Dec 2019 | Kutty PKS | Cheepuru Kiran Kumar |

=== Exhibitions : 2020 ===
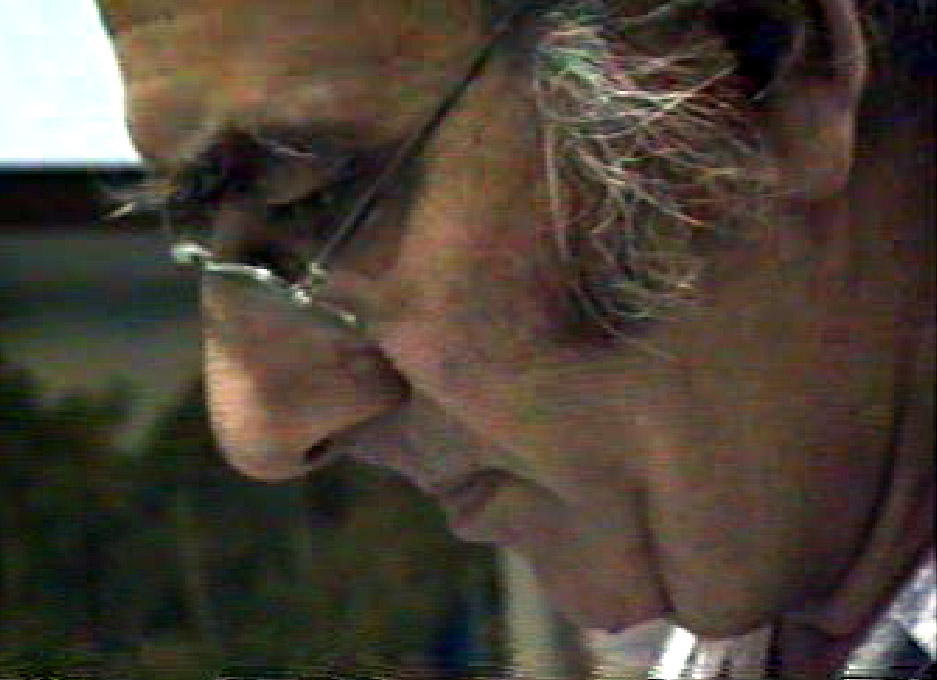
Sudhir Dar, 11-25 Jan 2020

| Duration Date | Cartoonist/s | Inaugurated by |
|---|---|---|
| 11-25 Jan 2020 | Exhibition of cartoons by Sudhir Dar | ... |
| 8-22 Feb 2020 | Exhibition of the work by Shaunak Samvatsar | Bharat M Mehta |
| 14-21 Mar 2020 | Exhibition of the Cartoons by Megaravalli Subramanya | S N Sethuram |
| 12-24 Oct 2020 | Online Exhibition of cartoons by R. K. Laxman on his 100th Birth Anniversary | ... |

=== Exhibitions : 2021 ===
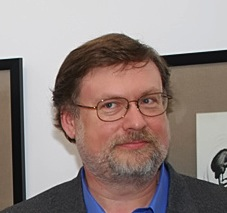
Daryl Cagle, 6-27 Mar 2021

| Duration Date | Cartoonist/s | Inaugurated by |
|---|---|---|
| 6-27 Feb 2021 | Exhibition of the work by Izabela Kowalska Wieczorek (Poland) | ... |
| 6-27 Mar 2021 | Exhibition of the Cartoons by Daryl Cagle (US) | ... |
| 21 Aug-11 Sep 2021 | Foreign Cartoons (MKMA 2019–2020) | ... |
| 25 Sep-16 Oct 2021 | Indian Cartoons (MKMA 2019–2020) | ... |
| 23 Oct-13 Nov 2021 | Laxman@100 (Commemorates the birth centenary of the legendary Cartoonist R. K. Laxman) | ... |
| 20 Nov-04 Dec 2021 | Exhibition of the Cartoons by Coffee Shankar | ... |
| 11-25 Dec 2021 | Witty World by Klaus Pitter | ... |

=== Exhibitions : 2022 ===
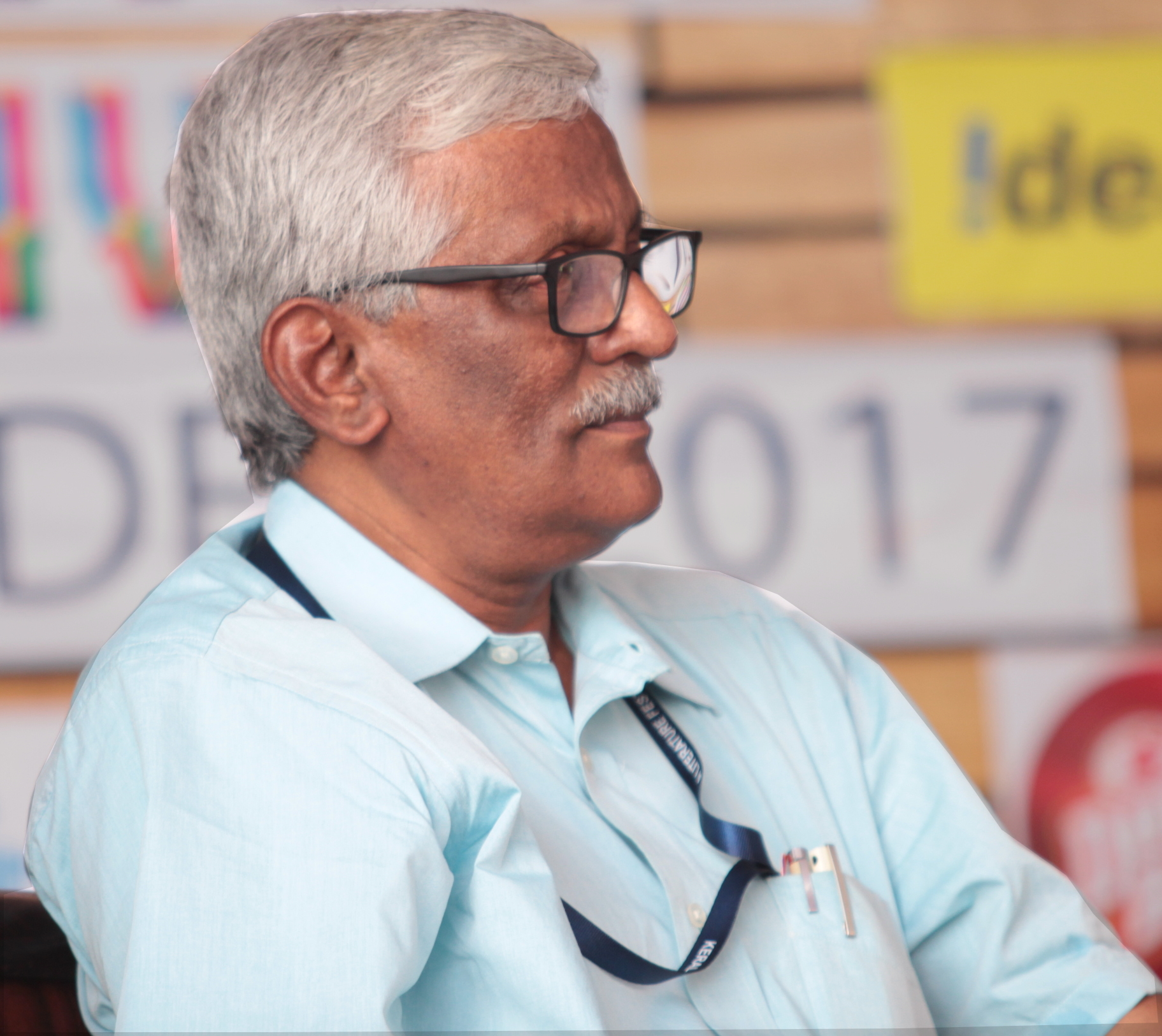
E. P. Unny, 04-21 Jun 2022

| Duration Date | Cartoonist/s | Inaugurated by |
|---|---|---|
| 1-21 Jan 2022 | Big Caricatures by 21 Karnataka Cartoonists | ... |
| 31 Jan -12 Feb 2022 | America in Cartoons by Shreyas Navare | ... |
| 05-26 Mar 2022 | "Just Like That" by Sudheendra Koushik | ... |
| 02-23 Apr 2022 | Bangla Cartoon 150 (1872-2022) curated by Bibek Sengupta | ... |
| 07-24 May 2022 | The World of Anirban Bora (A Tribute Exhibition towards the departed soul) | ... |
| 04-21 Jun 2022 | Cartoon & Sketches by E. P. Unny | ... |
| 02-23 July 2022 | Foreign Cartoons (MKMA 2021) | ... |
| 06-23 Aug 2022 | Indian Cartoons (MKMA 2021) & Cartoons by Ajit Ninan (1955-2023) | ... |
| 03-14 Sept 2022 | Cartoons by Marco De Angelis (Italian Cartoonist) | ... |
| 24 Dec. 2022 - 07 Jan. 2023 | Cartoons & Caricatures by Irfan Khan | ... |

=== Exhibitions : 2023 ===
| Duration Date | Cartoonist/s | Inaugurated by |
|---|---|---|
| 04-18 Feb. 2023 | Caricatures by Nedumaran | ... |
| 03-17 Jun. 2023 | Cartoons by Malatesh Garadimani | B. G. Gujjarappa |
| 22 Jul. 2023 - 05 Aug. 2023 | Cartoons & Illustrations by Enver Ahmed (1909–1992) | ... |
| 26 Aug. 2023 - 23 Sep. 2023 | Cartoons by Jayanto Banerjee | ... |
| 07-21 Oct. 2023 | Cartoons by Chiluveru Mrityunjay | ... |
| 04-18 Nov. 2023 | Cartoons by Soumyadip Sinha | ... |
| 11-23 Dec. 2023 | Cartoons by Silvano Mello | ... |

=== Exhibitions : 2024 ===
| Duration Date | Cartoonist/s | Inaugurated by |
|---|---|---|
| 06-31 Jan. 2024 | CartoonistsIndia 2023 | ... |
| 01-15 Jun. 2024 | Dave Brown (British Cartoonist) | ... |
| 06-20 Jul. 2024 | Keshav Venkataraghavan | ... |

=== Exhibitions : 2025 ===
| Duration Date | Cartoonist/s | Inaugurated by |
|---|---|---|
| 13 Feb.-01 Mar. 2025 | Angel Boligan (Cuban Cartoonist) | ... |
| 19 Apr.-05 May 2025 | Cartoons Karnataka 2025 | ... |
| 07-28 Jun. 2025 | R K Laxman | ... |
| 05-26 Jul. 2025 | Cartoons by Aswath | ... |
| 02-23 Aug. 2025 | Cartoons by Surendra | ... |
| 06-16 Sep. 2025 | Cartoons by S. D. Phadnis | ... |
| 04-31 Oct. 2025 | Gandhi Caricatures "As International Exhibition" | ... |
| 15-30 Nov. 2025 | Cartoons by Ravikant Nandula | ... |
| 06-27 Dec. 2025 | Cartoonist India 2025 (Annual Magazine & Exhibition | ... |

=== Exhibitions : 2026 ===
| Duration Date | Cartoonist/s | Inaugurated by |
|---|---|---|
| 2-23 May. 2026 | Mario @ 100 | ... |

== BARTONS lifetime Achievement Award ==
| Date | Awarded to | . |
|---|---|---|
| 06 Aug 2022 | Ajit Ninan | India Today, The Times of India |
| 26 Aug 2023 | Jayanto Banerjee | India Today, Hindustan Times |
| 06 Jul 2024 | Keshav Venkataraghavan | The Hindu |
| 26 Jul 2025 | Surendra | The Hindu |
| 26 Jul 2026 | Subhani | Deccan Chronicle |

== Maya Kamath Memorial Award ==
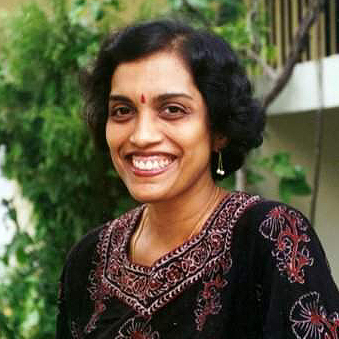
Maya Kamath (1951 - 2001)

The Maya Kamath Memorial Awards(MKMA : 2008-2021) Competition for excellence in political cartoons and Best Budding Cartoonists award was started in 2008. IIC is also organising MKMA competition. These awards have been instituted by the family of late cartoonist Maya Kamath(1951-2001). The jury for selecting best cartoons for the awards includes Girish Karnad, S. G. Vasudev, B. G. Gujjarappa and Satish Acharya.

=== Awardees of MKMA ===
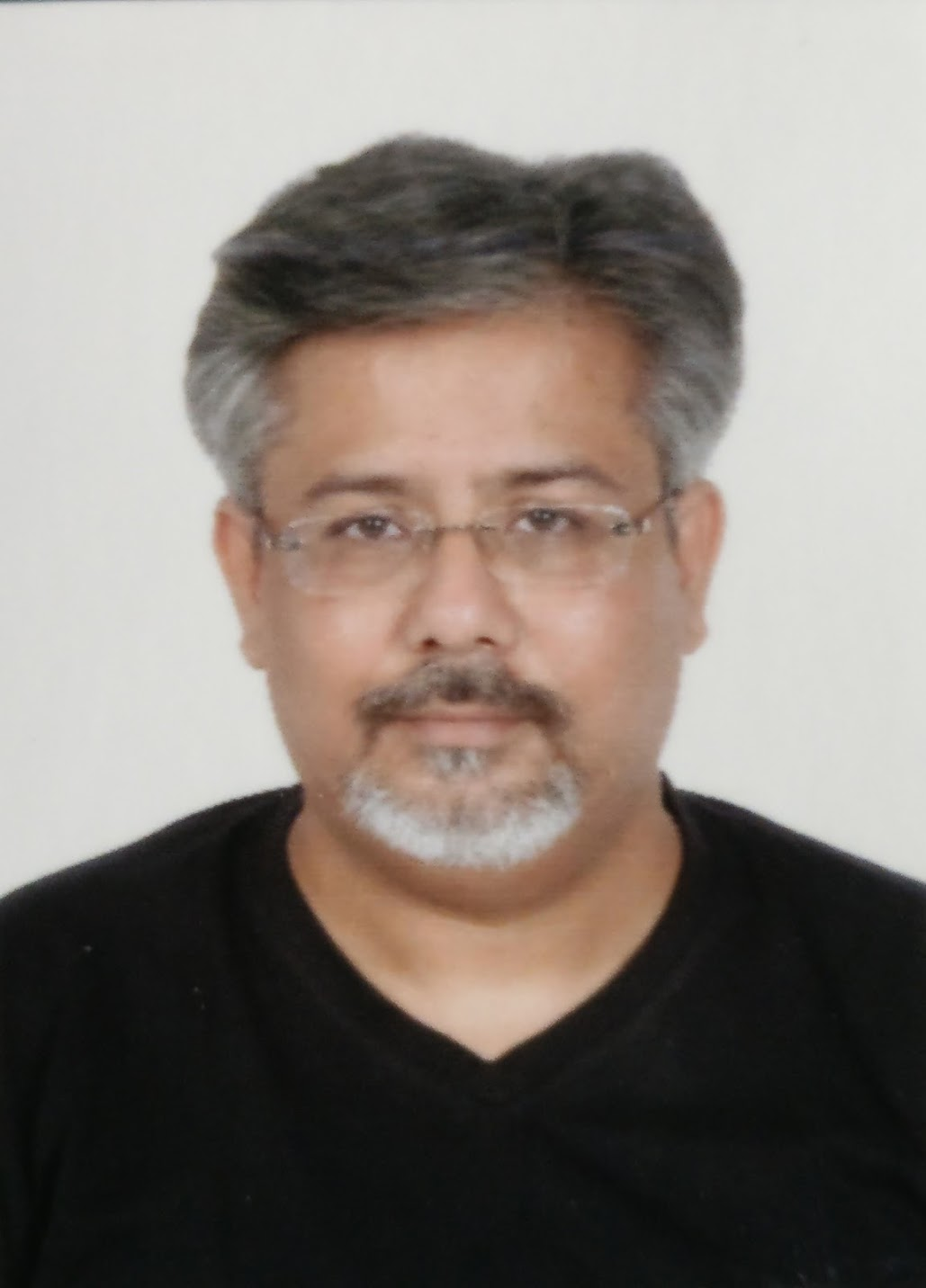
Manjul Kishore, May 18, 2010

| Award | 1st Prize | 2nd Prize | 3rd Prize | Special Jury Appreciation | Best Budding Cartoonist | Best Foreign Cartoonist |
|---|---|---|---|---|---|---|
| MKMA:2008 | Sandeep Adhwaryu | Ramadhyani, Shimoga | Shankar Pamarthy | . | Mujib Patla | |
| MKMA:2009 | Manjul Kishore | Mohd. Zahoor | Prashant Kulkarni | . | Rebecca Taylor | |
| MKMA:2010 | Vivek Thakker | Shyamal Das | Satish Acharya | . | Margaret Samte, Siyang Borang | |
| MKMA:2011 | Mohd. Zahoor | K. N. Balraj | Sajith Kumar | . | Siddharth Achaya, Kapil Gholap | |
| MKMA:2012 | Dwijith | Uday Vitla | Ramadhyani | . | Kapil Gholap, Ahan Tulshn | Pena Pai (Romania) |
| MKMA:2013 | Tanmay Tyagi | Manoj Chopra | Alok Nirantar | . | Rohit Padma | Valentin Georgeiv (Bulgaria) |
| MKMA:2014 | Satish Acharya | Kantesh Badiger | Rohan Chakravarthy | . | Leeza John | Paolo Dalponte (Italy), Behzad Ghafari (Canada) |
| MKMA:2015 | Alok Nirantar | V. R. Ragesh | Gokul Gopalakrishnan | . | M.K. Kishan | Yaser Delfan (Iran), Makhmudjon Eshonkulov (Uzbekistan) |
| MKMA:2016 | T.K. Sujith | Prasannan Anickad | Dhananjay Ekbote | . | Debashish Singh | Amir Soheili (Iran), Cornel Cheorean (Romania), Saeed Sadegahi (Iran) |
| MKMA:2017 | Sasi Kumar | Mruthyunjay | Ranjith M S | . | Ali Haidar | Makhmudjon Eshonkulov (Uzbekistan), Jitet Kustana (Indonesia) |
| MKMA:2018 | Prashant Kulkarni | Malatesh Garadimani | Vikram Nayak | . | Suprabho Roy, Atharva Vanakundre | Darko Drljevic (Montenegro), Liu Quiang (China) |
| MKMA:2019 | Uday Deb | Debashish Singh | Sujith T.K. | Alok Nirantar, Mika Aziz, Rituparno Basu | Atharva Vanakundre | Sunshen Yi (China), Saeed Sadeghi (Iran) |
| MKMA:2020 | Vikram Nayak | Santosh Bhise | Shiva K.M. | Malatesh Garadimani, Mrityunjay, Sankar Ghosh | Vishal Shenoy | Ali Shafei (Iran), Hamid Soufi (Iran) |
| MKMA:2021 | Sumanta Baruah | Kallol Majumdar | Najunda Swamy | Jairaj TG, Panduranga Rao, Ragesh VR | Abhishek Nayak | Jitet Kustana (Indonesia), Marco De Angelis (Italy), Mansoure Dehgahani (Iran) |
