= B. M. Gafoor =

Indian cartoonist (1942–2003)

- Born: 4 May 1942; Tellicherry, Madras Presidency, British India
- Died: 13 November 2003 (aged 61); Calicut, Kerala, India
- Occupation: Cartoonist
- Years active: 1980–2003
- Spouse: Suhara Gaffoor
- Children: 4 (Tazneem, Thanveer, Thanzeela, Thajmal)
- Parent(s): Vaidyarakath Mohammed Kutty Haji & B.M. Mariyumma Hajjumma
- Relatives: B. M. Suhara (sister)

B. M. Gafoor (4 May 1942 – 13 November 2003) was an Indian cartoonist and comic artist. He was one of the most prominent cartoonists from Kerala and was one of the founders of Kerala Cartoon Academy. Within a career of more than three decades, he created some of the most popular comics including the social satire Kunjamman.

== Early life ==
A native of Tellicherry, Gafoor was a student at St. Joseph's High School, Calicut when M.V. Devan began teaching him painting. He was exposed to another prominent painter, K. C. S. Paniker when he attended the Madras School of Arts and Crafts, where Paniker served as principal.

== Career ==
Gafoor served as a cartoonist for many publications, including the Chandrika, Shankar's Weekly, Deshabhimani and Cut Cut, before settling down for the remainder of his career at Mathrubhumi. He remained at Mathrubhumi from 1980 until his death in 2003. He also had his own magazine for a time, Niramala, which he had started during the Emergency.

In 2000, during his tenure at Mathrubhumi, Gafoor became Creative Animation Director with the Nest company in Ernakulam, remaining for a year. He is also the founder of BMG Group, an animation company based in Kozhikode. He played a major role in establishing the Kerala Cartoon Academy and served as its founder secretary. He was also a key figure in establishing Calicut Art Gallery.

Gafoor died of a heart attack on 13 November 2003. He was aged 61. In his honor, Kerala Government has established an annual award named "Gafoor Smaraka Puraskaram".

== Major works ==
=== Kunjamman ===
Kunjamman (Uncle Kunj) is a popular satirical cartoon published in Mathrubhumi from 1980 onwards. It was conceptualised and illustrated by Gafoor. The central character Kunjamman depicts an ordinary man who raises his voice against corruption and malpractices. Kunjamman had major social and political impacts in contemporary Kerala. BMG Animations created an animated version of the cartoon, "B.M. Gafoor's Kunjamman", which was telecast on Kairali TV and on Indiavision. Kunjamman has completed 2000 episodes.

=== Tintumon ===
The equivalent of Little Johnny for Malayalees, Tintumon, was originally created by Gafoor. Though it was not popular in print, it reached the peak of popularity during the year 2009 through mobile SMS and e-mails. There were issues of copyright regarding its publication between Gafoor's BMG Group and another animation company, which led to a legal war in 2010. Later, its copyright was retained by the BMG Group, who in 2010, released an animated version of Tintumon. The animated version is also telecasted in Jeevan TV.
