= Kutty =

Kutty may refer to:

- Kutty (surname), in India
- Kutty (cartoonist) an Indian cartoonist

== Films ==
- Kutty (2001 film), 2001 Indian film by Janaki Vishwanathan
- Kutty (2010 film), 2010 Indian film by Mithran Jawahar
- Kutty Story, 2021 Indian anthology film
