= Ramamurthy =

Surname

Ramamurthy is a surname. Notable people with the surname include:

- B. Ramamurthy, Indian director
- B. V. Ramamurthy, Indian cartoonist
- Gidugu Ramamurthy, also known as Gidugu Venkata Ramamoorty
- Kathadi Ramamurthy, Indian actor, director and script writer
- Kodi Ramamurthy Naidu, Indian bodybuilder
- Nara Ramamurthy Naidu, Indian politician
- R. Ramamurthy, Indian politician, incumbent Member of the Tamil Nadu Legislative Assembly from the Vikravandi constituency
- Sendhil Ramamurthy, American actor
- S. V. Ramamurthy, Indian civil servant
- T K Ramamurthy, also known as T. K. Ramamoorthy, a South Indian Tamil music composer and violinist
- Vazhappady K. Ramamurthy, Indian politician from Tamil Nadu
- Vittal Ramamurthy, violinist in the Carnatic music tradition of South India
- V. S. Ramamurthy, Indian nuclear physicist

== See also ==
- Ram Murty
- Raumurthy
