= The Riot Peddlers =

Indian hardcore punk band

- Origin: Mumbai, India
- Genres: Hardcore punk; Punk rock
- Years active: 2010–present
- Members: Animesh Dass; Dhruv Sarkar; Anum Singh Ravi; Ashish Dharkar
- Past members: Ashwin Dutt

Logo

The Riot Peddlers are a hardcore punk band formed by Ashwin Dutt and Arun Singh Ravi in early 2010 in Mumbai, India. They are India’s first hardcore punk act, and an early member of the 'Bombay hardcore' scene alongside hardcore and post-hardcore bands such as Pacifist, Death by Fungi, and False Flag. The band have played at festivals and shows across the country as well as abroad in Singapore and Malaysia.

The band is openly political, and many of their lyrics touch on contemporary social and political issues in India, such as police corruption, casteism, wealth inequality, and sectarianism. Prominent political cartoonist Manjul designed the cover art for the EP High Horse, focusing on the band's "rebellious energy and spirit".

== Band members ==
Current Members

- Animesh Dass – bass (2010–2013, 2020–present)
- Dhruv Sarkar – drums (2019–present)
- Arun Singh Ravi – guitar (2010–present)
- Ashish Dharkar – guitar (2023–present)

Former and temporary members

- Ashwin Dutt – drums (2010–2019)
- Apurv Agrawal – guitarist (2020, on Strength in Dumbers only)
- Frank Pewar – bass, on-and-off instead of Animesh Dass. Appears on the seventh track of Sarkarsm (2010–2013)

== Discography ==
=== Albums and EPs ===
- Sarkarsm (2012)
- Strength in Dumbers (2020)
- High Horse (2023)

=== Singles ===
- Chai Paani (2023)
- Inconvenience Regretted (2023)
