= Kevy =

Indian cartoonist

Kerala Varma (1923 or 1924 – 23 July 2010), popularly known as Kevy, was an Indian political cartoonist.

Kevy began his career by publishing cartoons in Shankar's Weekly. He later became a staff cartoonist at Eastern Economist. During the Emergency, Kevy was jailed, ostensibly for drawing caricatures critical of the prime minister, Indira Gandhi. Kevy drew his last cartoons for The New Indian Express in 2008 and 2009.

Kevy believed in the distinction of cartoons from art, and chose to regard a cartoon as a message – the merit of which only depends on how effectively the message is conveyed. His style changed considerably over the course of his career.

He died on 23 July 2010 in Kochi, aged 86.
