= Enver Ahmed =

Indian cartoonist

Enver Ahmed (1909–1992), pen name Ahmed, was an Indian cartoonist and creator of Chandu, the turbanned, paunchy central character of a popular cartoon strip in the Hindustan Times.

== Life and career ==
Ahmed was born in Rawalpindi (then in India) in 1909 and graduated in science from the Government College in Lahore. He worked in a sugar mill before joining the advertising section of The Pioneer in Lucknow. His talent was spotted by editor Desmond Young, who made Ahmed the paper's cartoonist. Since the Pioneer was a pro-British paper, Ahmed ultimately decided to move on to The Dawn. There, however, he was uncomfortable with the paper's political support of the Muslim League.

In 1946, Ahmed moved to the Hindustan Times, where he succeeded the cartoonist Shankar. According to cartoonist Kamal Sarkar, the years between 1946 and 1950 saw Ahmed at his peak, a period when he drew with gusto, and his cartoons served a political purpose. In 1947, Ahmed's criticism of the Muslim League in his cartoons led to threats from Islamic fundamentalist groups. According to his obituary in The Independent, none other than Mahatma Gandhi advised Ahmed to leave India immediately. Accordingly, Ahmed went to England where he continued to contribute to his paper. He returned in 1948 and remained the paper's lead cartoonist till his retirement in 1961, after which he continued his association through his comic strip 'Chandu'. This earthy character, dressed in a loincloth and modelled after a friend of Ahmed's, was the 'first popular social comic' by an Indian cartoonist, according to cartoonist E. P. Unny.

== Books by Ahmed ==
Ahmed (1951). Ahmed's Political Pot-pourri: A Collection of Cartoons and Strips. Foreword by C. Rajagopalachari. Hindustan Times, 1951
