= Krishna Prasad Dar =

Indian printer, publisher and writer

- Born: 30 January 1893; Kolkata, West Bengal, India
- Died: 1977 (aged 83–84); India
- Occupations: Printer, writer
- Spouse: Daya Shuri
- Children: Sudhir Dar Asoka Dar
- Parent(s): Har Prasad Dar; Pranpati
- Awards: Padma Shri

Krishna Prasad Dar (1893-1977) was an Indian printer, publisher and writer, known for his book, Kashmiri Cooking, a book detailing Kashmiri cuisine. Born in Kolkata, in the Indian state of West Bengal on 30 January 1893 to Har Prasad Dar and Pranpati as one of their five children, he completed his college studies at the St. Xavier's College, Calcutta. Later, he set up a printing press, Allahabad Law Journal Press, which grew to become one of the leading printers and publishers of the region. It was at this press that some of the books of Jawaharlal Nehru such as Letters from a Father to His Daughter and Glimpses of World History were published.

Dar is the author of Kashmiri Cooking, a book on Kashmiri cuisine, which was later published by Penguin India Books with illustrations by his son, Sudhir Dar, noted Indian cartoonist. Before bringing out Kashmiri Cooking, he published two books, Copy and Proof, and Adhunik Chapayi (Modern Printing), both considered by many as manuals on printing and publishing. The Government of India awarded him the fourth highest Indian civilian award of Padma Shri in 1975.

Krishna Prasad Dar was married to Daya Shuri, and they had four children. He died in 1977 at the age of 83. One of his sons, Sudhir Dar, was a known cartoonist, and died in 2019.

== See also ==
- Sudhir Dar
