= Sudhir Dar =

Indian cartoonist (1932–2019)

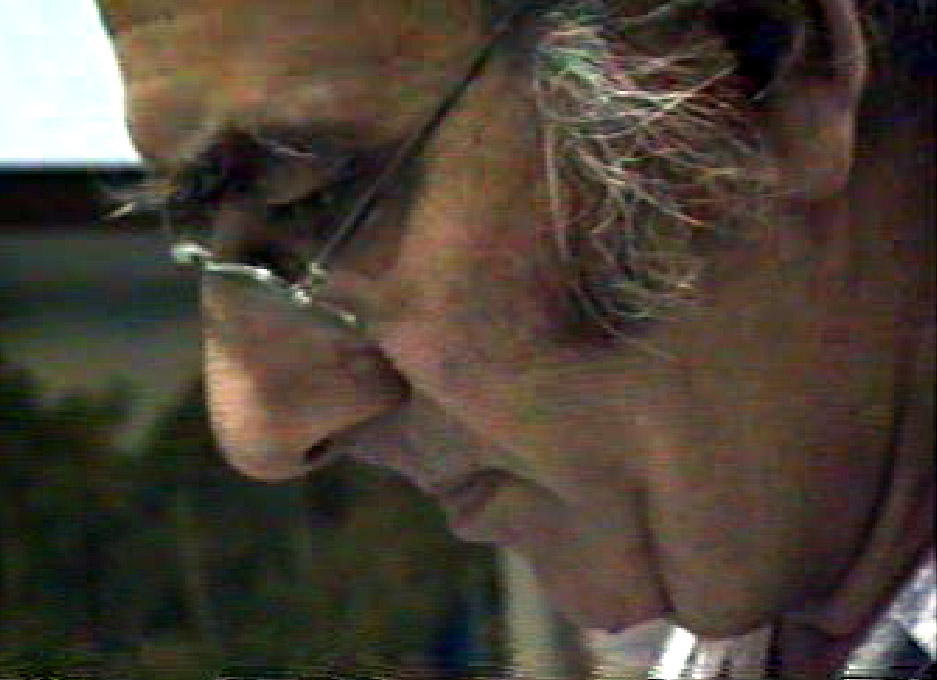
- Born: 14 May 1932; Allahabad, British India
- Died: 26 November 2019 (aged 87); Noida, Uttar Pradesh, India
- Occupations: Cartoonist, illustrator
- Years active: 1961–2019
- Spouse: Rummy Dar
- Children: 2
- Parent(s): Krishna Prasad Dar and Daya Shuri

Sudhir Dar (14 May 1932 – 26 November 2019) was an Indian cartoonist and illustrator. Starting with The Statesman in 1961, he went on to work as a political cartoonist for the Hindustan Times from 1967 for over two decades. Subsequently, he joined The Pioneer and in 2000 started working as a freelancer.

== Early life ==
Sudhir Dar, who was of Kashmiri descent, was born in 1932 in Allahabad (present-day Prayagraj) to Krishna Prasad Dar. He earned a master's degree in geography from the University of Allahabad.

== Career ==
Dar started his career with All India Radio, working as an announcer in the 1950s. A sketch he drew of the news editor of The Statesman during a talk radio show led to an offer to work at the paper. So, with no formal training, he joined The Statesman under editor Evan Charlton in 1961 and continued until 1967 doing front-page pocket cartoons without captions titled Out of My Mind.

In 1967, Dar joined the largest-selling newspaper in North India, The Hindustan Times, where he was the political staff cartoonist for over two decades. Dar's pocket cartoon This is It appeared regularly on the front page. According to Maurice Horn in The World Encyclopedia of Cartoons, Dar's time at the Hindustan Times was marked by acts of resistance against attempts to curtail his freedom, until he resigned in anger in 1989.

For a few years, Dar worked at The Independent in Bombay. Later, he also worked for The Pioneer from 1991 to 1998, and Delhi Times (a supplement of The Times of India). Dar retired in 2000, but continued working as a freelancer. His cartoons had also appeared in other publications like The New York Times, Saturday Review, Washington Post and Mad.

After retirement, he worked as an illustrator on assignments for the World Bank, Microsoft and various government departments including the Ministries of Tourism, External Affairs, and Jammu and Kashmir. He illustrated his father Krishna Prasad Dar's Kashmiri Cooking. He also illustrated physicist Jayant Narlikar's Journey Through the Universe.

His originals are reportedly in possession of the Queen of the United Kingdom, Richard Attenborough, Yehudi Menuhin and many other leading politicians and celebrities.

He lived in Gurgaon, a suburb of Delhi. He died on 26 November 2019 in Noida following cardiac arrest.

== Reception ==
According to the Indo-Asian News Service, although Sudhir Dar worked as a political cartoonist, he largely refrained from satirising specific politicians and events, instead taking digs at more general subjects such as corruption and bureaucracy.

According to cartoonist Rajinder Puri, "Dar was never by inclination a political cartoonist. He is not a political animal. His attitude to politics is somewhat akin to what I imagine would have been the attitude of Bertie Wooster. Dar's forte was humour. Pure humour of the zany kind."

== Bibliography ==
=== As author and illustrator ===
- Out of My Mind. The Statesman, 1966.
- This Is It!. Vikas Pub. House, 1976.
- Out of My Mind Again!. Vikas Pub. House, 1977.
- The Best of This Is It!. Rupa & Co., 1988.
- The Best of Sudhir Dar. Penguin Books, 2000. ISBN 0141002468.
- Sudhir Dar Classics. Penguin Books, 2004. ISBN 0143031112.
- The Mad, Mad World of Elections. Penguin Books, 2004. ISBN 0143032038.
- The Mad, Mad World of Cricket. Penguin Books, 2007. ISBN 0143101846.

=== As illustrator ===
- Kashmiri Cooking by Krishna Prasad Dar. Penguin Books, 1995. ISBN 0140255656.
- Journey Through the Universe by Jayant Narlikar. National Book Trust, 1989
