= Swaminathan Aiyar =

Indian economist and journalist (born 1938)

- Born: Swaminathan Shankar Anklesaria Aiyar; 12 October 1942 (age 83); Akola, Bombay Presidency, British India (present day Maharashtra, India)
- Education: St. Stephen's College, Delhi; Magdalen College, Oxford
- Occupations: Journalist, writer, columnist
- Notable credit: Swaminomics
- Children: 3, including Pallavi Aiyar

Swaminathan S. Anklesaria Aiyar (born 12 October 1942) is an Indian economist, journalist, and columnist. He is consulting editor for the Economic Times and writes regularly for the Economic Times and The Times of India. He is also a Research Fellow at the Cato Institute. He is the elder brother of Mani Shankar Aiyar, who is a senior Congress leader.

== Early life ==
Aiyar was born to Vaidyanatha Shankar Aiyar, a chartered accountant, and Bhagyalakshmi Shankar. He is the younger brother of Mani Shankar Aiyar, a politician who has served as Minister for Panchayati Raj in the Indian government. After the loss of their father in an air crash, Aiyar's mother had to negotiate with Doon to allow her sons to continue their studies with reduced fees and in return she taught at the school.

An alumnus of Welham Boys' School, The Doon School, and St Stephen's College, University of Delhi, he earned a master's degree in economics from Magdalen College, Oxford.

== Career ==
He is a research fellow at the Cato Institute, a libertarian think tank in Washington D.C., and an occasional consultant to the World Bank.

He previously served as editor of The Economic Times (1992–94), The Financial Express (1988–90) and Eastern Economist (1980–82).

Aiyar writes a weekly column titled "Swaminomics" in the Times of India, where he discusses economic and political issues pertaining to India and the world. Aiyar has prepared several reports and papers for the World Bank. In 1976–85 and 1990–98, he was also the India correspondent of The Economist.

He has written two books: Towards Globalisation (1992) and Swaminomics: Escape from the Benevolent Zookeepers (2008).

He is currently consulting editor of The Economic Times, India's leading financial daily that is part of Bennett, Coleman & Co, the same company that owns The Times of India.

== Personal life ==
Aiyar has three children: Pallavi Aiyar and Shekhar Aiyar from his newsreader ex-wife Gitanjali Aiyar (née Ambegaonkar), and Rustam Aiyar from his second marriage with Shahnaz Anklesaria. He is an atheist.

== Bibliography ==
- Towards Globalisation (1992)
- Swaminomics: Escape from the Benevolent Zookeepers (2008)
