= Gitanjali Aiyar =

Indian television journalist (1952 – 2023)

- Born: 29 January 1947
- Died: 7 June 2023 (aged 76)
- Education: Loreto College (B.A.)
- Occupation: News Anchor
- Years active: (1971–2023)
- Television: Khandaan (1985)
- Spouse: Swaminathan Aiyar
- Children: 2
- Awards: Indira Gandhi Priyadarshini Award (1989)

Gitanjali Aiyar (née Ambegaonkar, 29 January 1947 – 7 June 2023) was India's female news presenter on Doordarshan. She collapsed and died after a morning walk in New Delhi due to brain haemorrhage. She was suffering from Parkinson's disease and was 76.

== Early life and education ==
Aiyar attended Loreto College in Kolkata. She also studied for a diploma at the National School of Drama. She featured in many advertisements and also acted in Khandaan, a popular tele-serial on DD in the mid-1980s. She had a daughter, journalist Pallavi Aiyar and a son, Shekhar Aiyar from her ex-husband Swaminathan Aiyar.

== Career ==
Aiyar joined All India Radio after her graduation and then Doordarshan in 1976 and soon became a popular voice in the country. For more than a decade she was regular at the 9pm prime time DD news bulletin. She worked at DD for over 30 years. She was a contemporary of Neethi Ravindran, Shammi Narang and Rini Simon. She hosted 'A Date With You', a popular show taking request for English songs on All India Radio on Friday nights. After leaving DD, she worked in the corporate communication department of Confederation of Indian Industry (CII) before joining the non-profit World Wildlife Fund for Nature.

== Awards ==
Aiyar won the Best Anchor award four times. She also won the Indira Gandhi Priyadarshini Award for Outstanding Woman in 1989.
