= Raobail =

Cartoonist and illustrator (1937-2018)

Prabhakar Rao
- Born: Raobail; 17 November 1937; Kasargod, India
- Died: 4 April 2018 (aged 80); Bangalore, India
- Occupations: Artist, Cartoonist
- Known for: "Uncommon Man"
- Spouse: Kumudini Rao
- Children: Ujwala, Sharmila

Prabhakar Rao, aka Prabhakar Raobail, or Raobail (17 November 1937 – 4 April 2018), was an Indian artist and cartoonist.

Raobail was born in 1937 in Kasargod. He studied science in Bangalore and later, studied for a diploma in Applied Arts from the JJ Institute of Applied Art in Mumbai. He joined the Art Department of the Life Insurance Corporation of India as an illustrator and designer, working there for over 31 years. He retired from here and settled down in Dharwad in 1989.

Raobail has contributed cartoons and illustrations to a host of newspapers and magazines. He adopted his professional name 'Raobail', because he thought his original surname 'Rao' was far too common. Under this name, he published in publications such as the Indian Express, the Times of India, Reader’s Digest, The Illustrated Weekly of India, Eve’s Weekly, Imprint, Debonair, Blitz, Sun, Inside Outside, and the Taj Magazine, besides regional publications. His cartoons have featured in the Penguin Book of Indian Cartoons edited by Abu Abraham.

Raobail has designed and illustrated children’s books for UNICEF, such titles as Chakramadhye, Saban, and Railgaadi. He has done greeting cards for CRY and Concern India. He also created collage art using stamps and envelopes.

He has held one-man exhibitions in India and abroad. A selection of his work over 25 years was shown in 2008. In 2009, he was selected by Indian Institute of Cartoonists for their Lifetime Achievement Award.

After a heart attack he died on April 4, 2018, at the age of 80.
