= Pallavi Aiyar =

Indian journalist and author

Pallavi Aiyar is an Indian journalist and author currently based in Beijing. Previously, she was the Indonesia correspondent for The Hindu, Europe correspondent for the Business Standard and China bureau chief for The Hindu.

== Biography ==
Aiyar is the daughter of Indian journalist Swaminathan Aiyar from his newsreader ex-wife Gitanjali Aiyar (née Ambegaonkar). She obtained a B.A in philosophy from St. Stephen's College, Delhi University, an M.A in modern history from St Edmund Hall, Oxford, and an MSc in global media and communications from the London School of Economics. In 1999, she became a journalist for Star News and eventually became the China bureau chief of The Hindu in 2006. In 2007, she was awarded the Prem Bhatia Memorial Prize for Excellence in Reporting. Also in 2007, she was a fellow at the Reuters Institute for the Study of Journalism at the University of Oxford.

In September 2008, she gave birth to her first son.

In July 2008, she published her first book, Smoke and Mirrors, (HarperCollins) on her experiences in China. The book won the Vodafone-Crossword Readers Choice Award for 2008. She is the also the author of the 2016 parenting memoir, Babies and Bylines, and 2011 novel, Chinese Whiskers. She was lead author of a new edition of the Lonely Planet, Discover China, guide tailored specifically for the Indian market. She has also published Punjabi Parmesan: Dispatches from a Europe in Crisis with Penguin India and New Old World: An Indian Journalist Discovers the Changing Face of Europe with St. Martin's Press.

She is a 2014 Young Global Leader of the World Economic Forum.
