= Yesudasan =

Indian cartoonist (1938–2021)

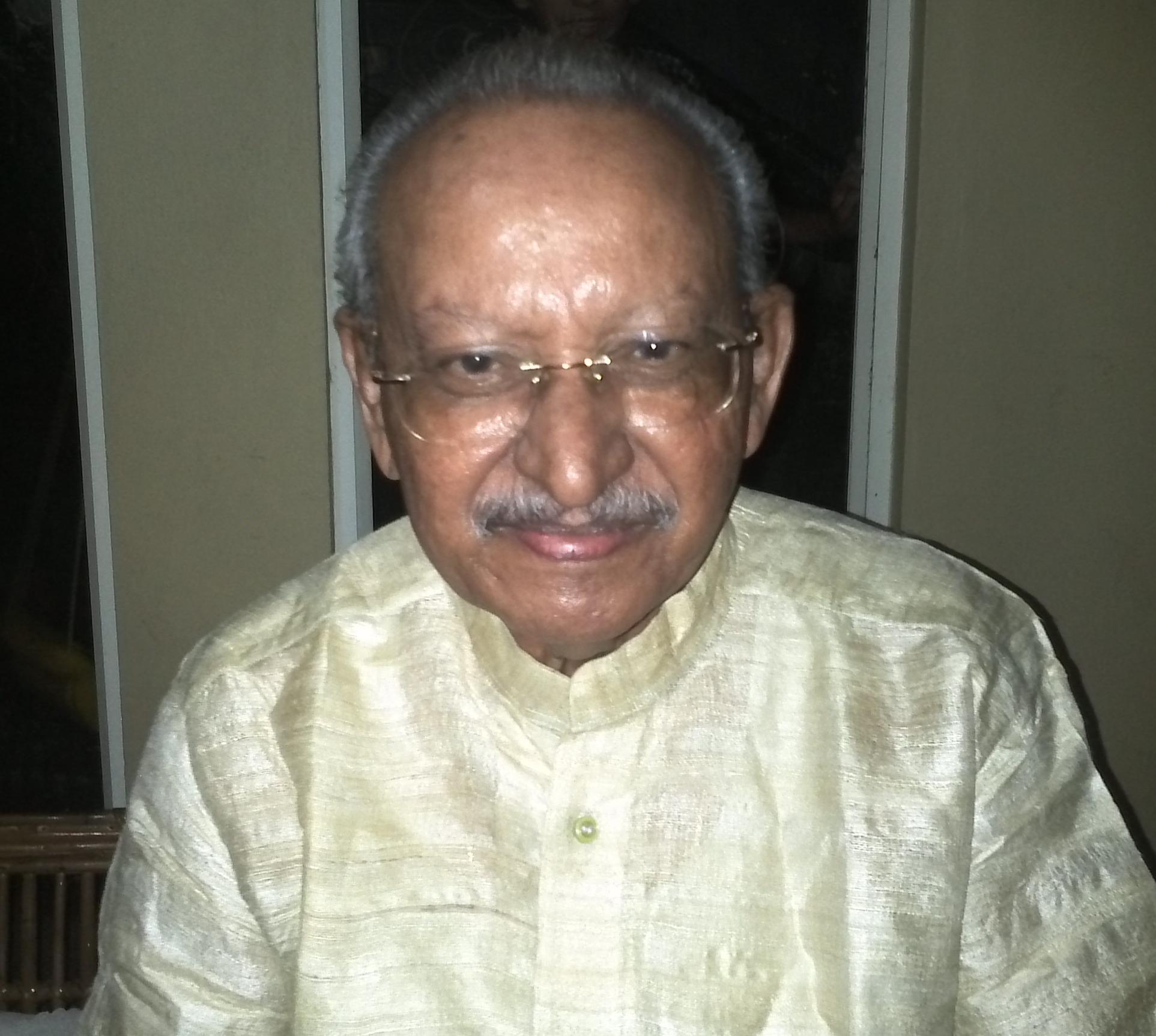
- Cartoonist Yesudasan in 2013
- Born: 12 June 1938; Bharanikkavu, kayamkulam, British India
- Died: 6 October 2021 (aged 83); Kochi, Kerala, India
- Citizenship: Indian
- Occupations: Cartoonist, Columnist, Script-writer
- Known for: Various cartoon characters in newspapers like Malayala Manorama and magazines.
- Spouse: Mercy Yesudasan
- Children: Sanu Yesudasan, Sethu Das, Suku Das
- Website: yesudasan.info

Chackalethu John Yesudasan (12 June 1938 – 6 October 2021), also known as Yesudasan, was an Indian political cartoonist from Kerala. He was the founding chairman of the Kerala Cartoon Academy and chairman of the Kerala Lalithakala Akademi.

== Early life ==
Yesudasan was born on 12 June 1938 in Bharanikkavu near kayamkulam in the Alappuzha district of modern day Kerala to Chakalethu John Mathai and Mariamma John. He completed his education in Bharanikkavu, Edappally, and Mavelikkara. He obtained his bachelor's degree from the Catholicate Faculty in Pathanamthitta.

== Career ==
Yesudasan published his first cartoon in 1955 in a magazine called Asoka published from Kottayam. He entered the world of political cartoons in 1960, drawing for Janayugom, the Malayalam daily of the Communist Party of India. He worked there for three years, drawing a pocket cartoon with the character Kittumman, after which he joined Shankar's Weekly in Delhi. From 1969, he was the editor of Balayugam, a children's magazine in Malayalam and edited Asadha, Cut-Cut and Tuk-Tuk, popular satirical magazines on politics and cinema. He joined the Malayala Manorama group in 1985 as staff cartoonist, running cartoon columns in the paper and The Week magazine. He worked with the group until his retirement in 2010. Some of the recurring characters that he created included Mrs Nair, Vanitha, and Ponnamma Superintendent. His cartoons served as a commentary on contemporary political events and were noted to be bold and added a fearless criticism of the political developments of the day.

He was the founding chairman of Kerala Cartoon Academy and had also served as the president and chairman of the Kerala Lalithakala Akademi.

Yesudasan authored four books—Aniyara, Pradhama Dhrusti, Post Mortem, and Varayile Nayanar. He also wrote the dialogues for the Malayalam political satire film Panchavadi Palam by director K. G. George.

== Awards ==
Yesudasan received the Lifetime Achievement Award by the Indian Institute of Cartoonists in 2001. In 2021, he won the Swadeshabimani-Kesari award, the highest honour given by the Government of Kerala for media persons, for his contributions to the cartoon and media sector. He was also the cartoonist of the year award winner of the Thiruvananthapuram Press Club in 1990 and 1992.

== Personal life ==
Yesudasan was married to Mercy. The couple had three sons and lived in Kochi.

Yesudasan died in Kochi on 6 October 2021 at the age of 83 from a heart attack caused by COVID-19 during the COVID-19 pandemic in India.

He is a member of the Malankara Orthodox Syrian Church and his funeral took place at St. Mary Chapel in Chittoor.
