= E. P. Unny =

Indian cartoonist

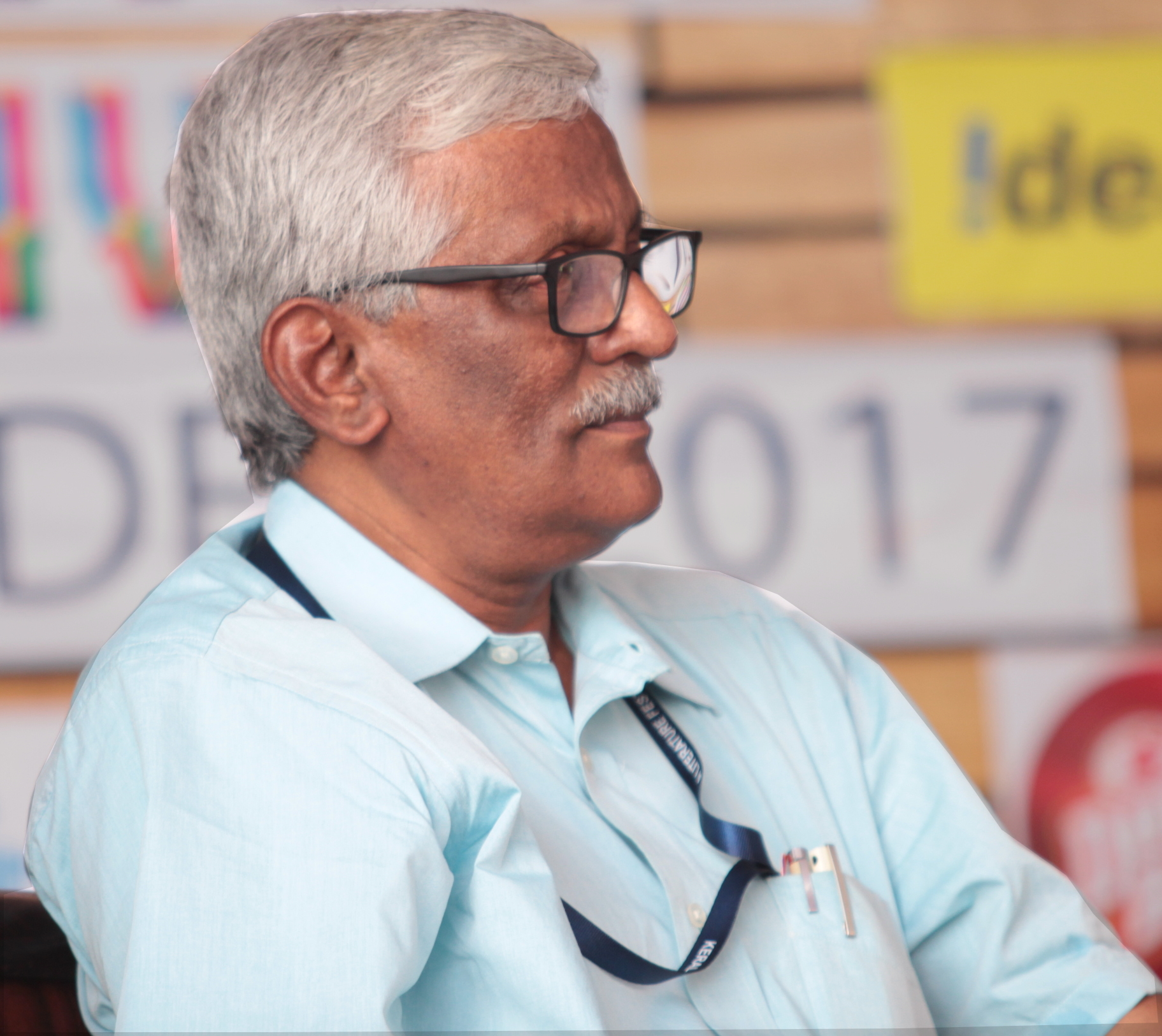
E P Unny in Kerala literature festival, Kozhikode (2017)

Ekanath Padmanabhan Unny is an Indian political cartoonist.

He was born in Palakkad, Kerala. He studied physics at a university in Kerala.

His first cartoon was published in Shankar's Weekly in 1973. Upon sending some cartoons to The Hindu, the editor Gopalan Kasturi offered him to join full-time. Unny left his job as a bank official to start his career as a professional cartoonist with The Hindu in 1977, where he spent 12 years learning about journalism from Kasturi. After leaving The Hindu in 1989, he moved to Delhi and worked with the Sunday Mail where he experimented with different forms of cartooning – pocket and editorial, as well as started working as a graphic editor.

Subsequently, he moved to The Economic Times. He is currently the Chief Political Cartoonist with The Indian Express, in which his editorial strip, Business as Usual, appears daily.

He has drawn and written graphic novels in Malayalam and a travel book on Kerala, Spices & Souls: A Doodler's Journey Through Kerala. He is said to have been doing graphic shorts in Malayalam literary journals as early as the 1990s. He has also written Santa and the Scribes: The Making of Fort Kochi, which was published in 2014.

A recurring character who features in his cartoons is a bespectacled young boy who makes statements too mature for his years. This character was developed during his time at Sunday Mail and resumed when he moved to The Indian Express. Unny avoids drawing cartoons about religion, claiming to have no knowledge about the subject. Cartoonists who had an influence on him include R. K. Laxman, K. Shankar Pillai, O. V. Vijayan, Abu Abraham and Rajinder Puri.

== Books ==
- Spices and Souls
- Business as Usual
- Santa and the Scribes: The Making of Fort Kochi
- RK Laxman: Back with a Punch
