= B. V. Ramamurthy =

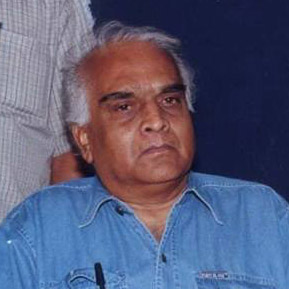
- Born: 14 October 1933; Bangalore, Kingdom of Mysore
- Died: 23 March 2004 (aged 70); New Delhi, India
- Occupations: Cartoonist, illustrator
- Known for: Mr. Citizen (cartoon column)
- Spouse: Rathna Murthy
- Relatives: 3

B. V. Ramamurthy (14 October 1933 – 23 March 2004) was an Indian cartoonist from Bangalore. His cartoons were published in Karnataka-based dailies and magazines such as the Deccan Herald, Prajavani, Mayura and Sudha. His cartoon column titled Mr. Citizen on Deccan Herald became popular among readers.

== Biography ==
Ramamurthy was a graduate in science from the St. Joseph's College in Bangalore. He began his career as a cartoonist in Kidi, a Kannada-language newspaper known for its satirical writings, run by his friend Seshappa, who is credited with the discovery of his talent. Ramamurthy received further encouragement by cartoonists Philip Spratt and Pothan Joseph.

Ramamurthy joined Deccan Herald in 1955 and invented the Mysore peta- and dhoti-clad "Mr. Citizen", a representative of the Indian middle-class man. He began the first column in 1958 titled As You Like It, which featured the character, Mr. Citizen. It was a depiction of a common man's agony and problems besides portraying political developments everyday. The character became widely popular, and when he was portrayed without a peta for a while, angry letters were sent by the readers leading to Ramamurthy reverting to the previous version. Speaking of the character's impact, former editor of Deccan Herald K. N. Harikumar recalled that readers identified with Mr. Citizen's "running commentary on life, its hypocrisies and the associated problems." He added that "[Ramamurthy] had a very personal vision of life. His cartoons were very specific. He moulded public perception." Ramamurthy retired from Deccan Herald in 1991 as an assistant editor but continued to be a contributor.

Ramamurthy attracted international attention for his drawings in the early 1980s for "Grin of the Year". His criticism of the former US President, Jimmy Carter, became popular among cartoonists. Recognizing his contribution to journalism as a cartoonist, he was given the Sandesha Award by the government of Karnataka in 1998. Ramamurthy died from cardiac arrest on 23 March 2004 in New Delhi.

=== Indian Institute of Cartoonists ===
Ramamurthy was the first chairperson of the Indian Institute of Cartoonists, a position he served until his death in 2004.

Exhibitions of Ramamurthy's cartoons organised by Indian Institute of Cartoonists at Indian Cartoon Gallery.
Date	Exhibition	Inaugurated by
16 August 2007	B. V. Ramamurthy, V. G. Narendra and B. G. Gujjarappa	T. N. Chaturvedi
30 June 2012	World of Ramamurthy	K. N. Harikumar
February 2017	World of Ramamurthy	
