= Kutty (cartoonist) =

Cartoonist

- Born: 4 September 1921; Ottapalam, Kerala, India
- Died: 22 October 2011 (aged 90); Madison, Wisconsin, U.S.
- Occupation: Cartoonist
- Spouse: Gouri
- Children: Narayanan, Maya
- Writing career
- Genre: Political

Puthukkody Kottuthody Sankaran Kutty Nair (4 September 1921 – 22 October 2011), better known as Kutty, was an Indian political cartoonist.

== Biography ==
Kutty was born at Ottapalam, Kerala in 1921 to Kayarat Narayana Menon and Kottuthodi Lakshmi Amma. Kutty was educated at Ottapalam and Malabar Christian College, Kozhikode. Kutty's talent was discovered by the famous Malayalam satirist, Professor M. R. Nair (better known by his pen name "Sanjayan"). His first cartoon appeared in the Malayalam humor magazine Viswaroopam (edited by Sanjayan) in 1940.

Rao Sahib V. P. Menon, a relative of Kutty's father and a senior official in the British Imperial Secretariat (New Delhi) introduced him to the famous Indian cartoonist Shankar. Shankar used to sketch cartoons for Hindustan Times and was looking for a trainee. V. P. Menon requested Shankar to train Kutty, who reached New Delhi on 3 January 1941. In those days, Jawaharlal Nehru (later India's first Prime Minister), a great admirer of Shankar's cartoons, was looking for a cartoonist for his newly started English Daily, National Herald, published from Lucknow. Shankar trained Kutty for 6 months and recommended him for Nehru's newspaper. Kutty became staff cartoonist of National Herald (Lucknow). His first cartoon to appear in a daily newspaper was published in the National Herald 15 January 1941.

National Herald was shut down in 1942 due to repressive policies of the British India Government, following the start of Quit India Movement. Kutty then relocated to Madras (now Chennai), where he worked for Madras War Review from 1943 to 1945. From 1945 to 1946, he worked The Free Press Journal a Mumbai) daily newspaper. In 1946, Kutty relocated to New Delhi at behest of Shankar, who wanted him to work as a cartoonist for his planned evening newspaper. From 1946 to 1997, Kutty lived in New Delhi and worked for various publications. In 1947-48, he worked for National Call and Amar Bharat. Kutty also contributed to Shankar's Weekly, a humor magazine launched in 1948. Here he worked with other notable Indian cartoonists including Abu Abraham and O. V. Vijayan. From 1948 to 1951, he was associated with the Indian News Chronicle.

In 1951, Kutty joined the Ananda Bazar Group of Calcutta (now Kolkata). His cartoons appeared in many of the group's publications such as the English daily Hindustan Standard (New Delhi, 1951–1986), the Bengali language daily Ananda Bazar Patrika (1975–1986) and Desh (Bengali literary weekly). Kutty’s work was also syndicated for publication in various newspapers such as Hindustan Times (1961–1962) and The Indian Express (1962–1969). From 1987 to 1997, Kutty worked for another Bengali daily, Aaj Kaal. He was also associated with the Bengali publication Parivarthan (Calcutta) in 1986-1987.

Kutty didn't know the Bengali language, but he spent the most productive part of his career with Bengali publications. This was due to his direct and simple visual expression with which he cut across language barriers. His used to caption his cartoons in English, which were translated into Bengali. Kutty's cartoons have also appeared in many Malayalam language periodicals (Malayalam was his mother tongue).

Kutty officially retired in 1997. He then moved to Madison, Wisconsin. In May 2005, rumors of Kutty's death started circulating in Kolkata. In response to this, Kutty's former colleagues at Aaj Kaal published the denial of the rumor with a new cartoon drawn by Kutty. This led to requests for more cartoons from his admirers. Kutty complied and sketched few more cartoons that were published in Aaj Kaal. However, he could not continue due to his deteriorating eyesight. Kutty wrote an English-language memoir, Years Of Laughter: Reminiscences Of A Cartoonist, released in 2009. He died on 22 October 2011 in the Madison, Wisconsin.
