= Satish Acharya =

Indian cartoonist

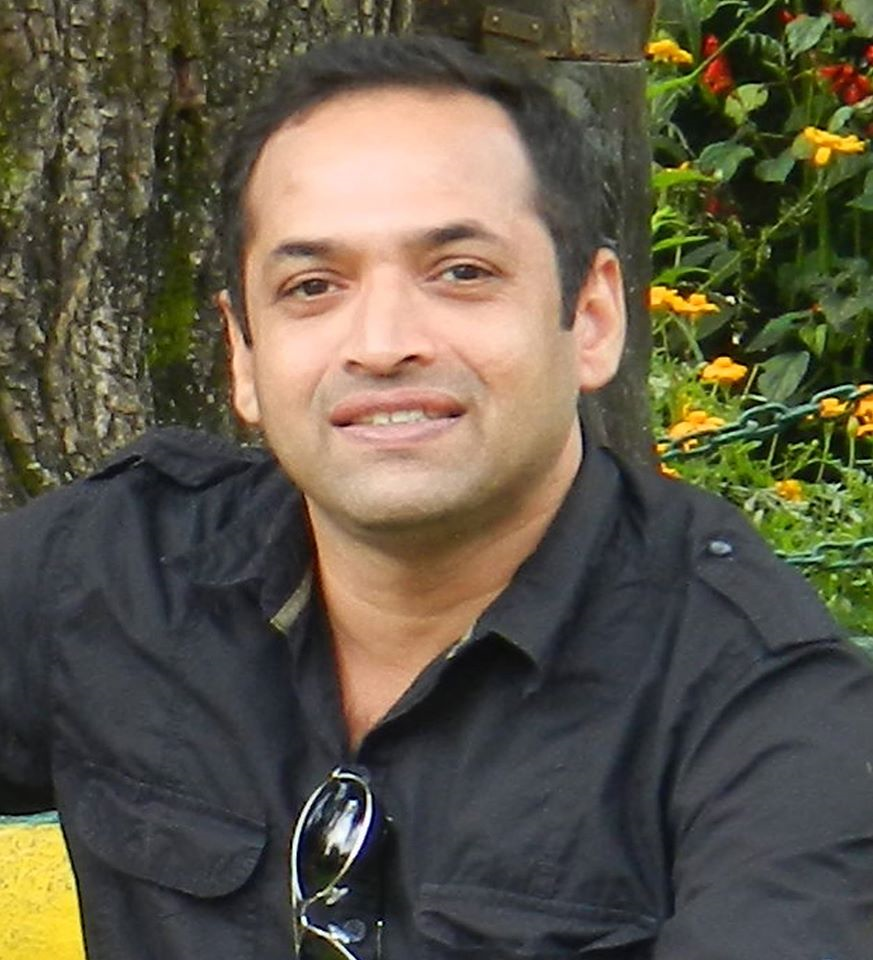
- Born: 24 March 1971 (age 55); Kundapura, Dakshina Kannada district, Mysore State (now Udupi district, Karnataka), India
- Education: Mangalore University
- Occupation: Cartoonist
- Spouse: Dr. Amitha
- Children: 2
- Parent(s): Padmanabha (father); Prema (mother)
- Website: http://www.cartoonistsatish.com/

Satish Acharya (Kannada: ಸತೀಶ್ ಆಚಾರ್ಯ) is an Indian cartoonist from Kundapura, Karnataka. In 2015, Acharya was featured on "United Sketches" as a professional cartoon from India. Acharya was also included in the list of "24 Intellectuals" by Forbes India, in 2015.

== Early life and education ==
Acharya is a self-taught cartoonist without any formal training in art. As a student, he earned pocket-money by contributing cartoons to Kannada publications like Taranga, Sudha and Tushara. He studied MBA in finance from Mangalore University after doing BCom from Bhandarkar’s College, Kundapura.

== Career ==
After completing MBA, Acharya moved to Mumbai and started in an advertising agency as an account executive, but quit to pursue cartooning. He got his first break as a political cartoonist with Mumbai-based English tabloid Midday. He started working with Midday as a staff cartoonist in 2003 and contributed to daily cartoon column for nine years. He also draws cartoons for Gulf News.

Mail Today rejected Acharya's cartoon showing PM Modi under China’s grip and dropped the cartoonist. Satish Acharya alleged censorship by Mail Today, but Mail Today editor Dwaipayan Bose called Acharya's allegations baseless.

Acharya's cartoon on the Charlie Hebdo Massacre was regarded as one of the most powerful cartoons on the tragedy by the foreign media and the cartoon was published in newspapers including The Wall Street Journal, The Times and The Guardian.

== Books ==
Acharya has released five cartoon books, of which are Mein, Hum and AAP in English, Cartoonishta in Kannada and Negipuggi in Kundapra Kannada. His cricket-cartoon book Non-Striker was officially released on 31 January 2015 in Bengaluru.

His latest cartoon book, ‘Go Corona Go’ was released in 2021 and became one of the first cartoon books with the pandemic as a theme.
