= B. M. Suhara =

Indian writer

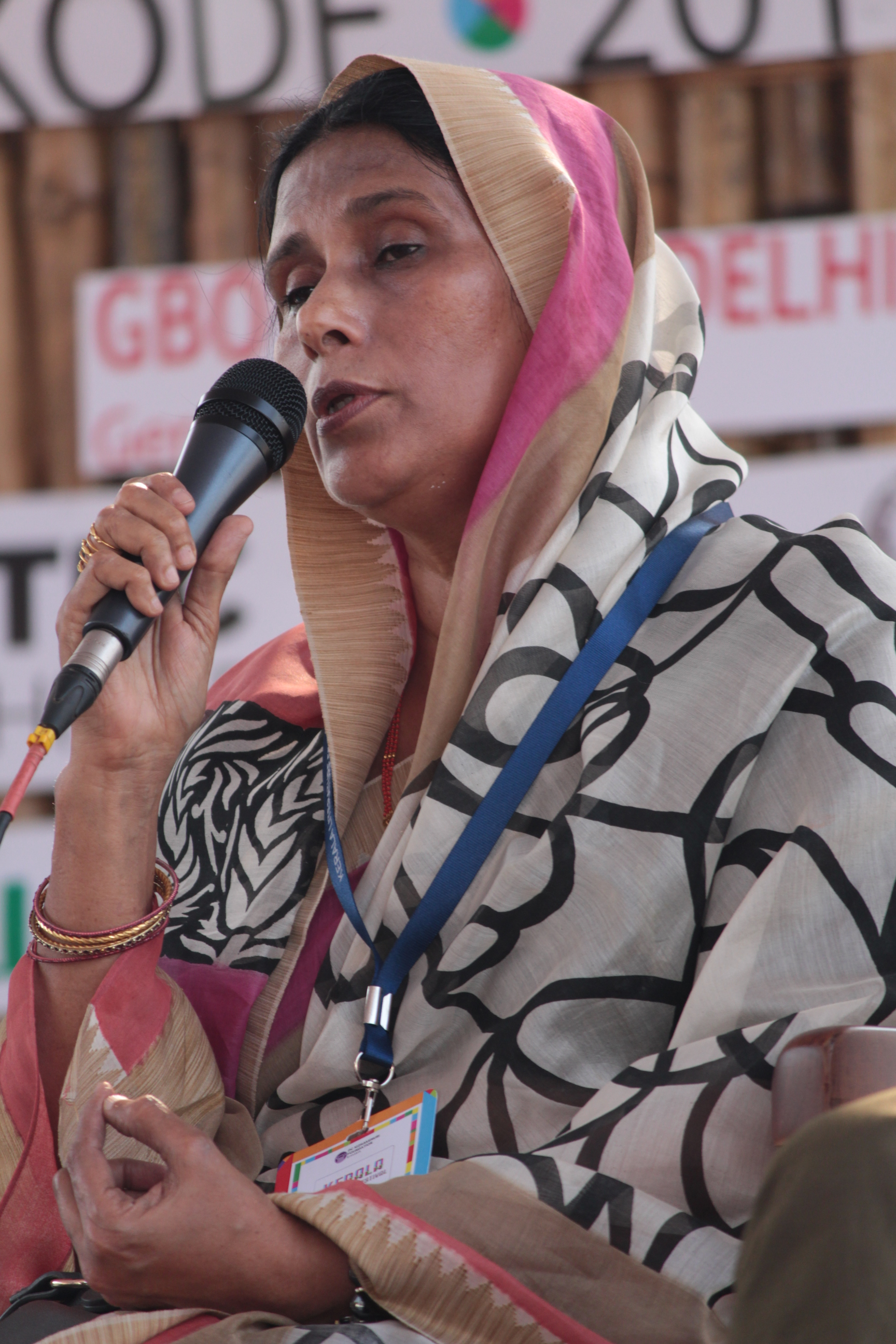
- Born: 11 October 1952 (age 73); Thikkodi, Malabar District, Madras State
- Occupation: Fiction writer
- Writing career
- Genres: Short story and novel
- Notable awards: Kerala Sahitya Akademi Award for lifetime achievement

B. M. Suhara is a Malayalam writer from Kerala, India. She was born in Thikkodi near Calicut.

== Awards ==
- 1992 – Lalithambika Antharjanam Memorial Special Award for outstanding creative talent in the field of Malayalam fiction and short story.
- 2004 – K. Balakrishanan Smaraka Award for total contribution to Malayalam Literature
- 2006 – Unnimoy Memorial Award for total contribution to Malayalam Literature
- 2008 – Kerala Sahitya Akademi Lifetime Achievement Award

== Published works ==
Year	Title	Publisher
1990	Kinavu	P.K. Brothers, Calicut
1991	Mozhi	Current Books, Thrissur
1994	Iruttu	D.C. Books, Kottayam
1997	Nilaavu	D.C. Books, Kottayam
1999	Nizhal	Sahithya Pravarthaka Co-Operative Society, Kottayam
2007	Aakaasa Bhoomikaludey Thaakkol	D.C. Books, Kottayam
