= Eastern Economist =

Defunct Indian economic magazine

Eastern Economist was an Indian business weekly. At one time, it was one of the prominent economic and business publications in India, along with others such as Commerce. It closed down in 1982 after having published for 40 years. The proprietor of the weekly at the time was Madhav Prasad Birla. The official reason given for closure were finances. It had a circulation of 3,600 readers at the time of its closure. It had four writers in its Delhi headquarters. The chief editor was Swaminathan S. Aiyar.
