= Kutty (surname) =

Kutty is a word in Tamil which means 'child' or 'baby'. In Tamil, the word is often used as a suffix, and not used as a surname. The word is also used as a pet name to show endearment to young kids or a woman. In Malayalam, the word is a common surname. Notable people bearing the surname include:

- Ahmad Kutty, North American Islamic scholar
- Asha Kelunni Kutty (born 1966), or Revathi, Indian actress and film director
- B. M. Kutty (1930–2019), Pakistani journalist
- Faisal Kutty, Canadian lawyer, writer and human rights activist
- Lola Kutty, or Anuradha Menon, Indian television actress and theatre artist
- Muhammad Kutty (born 1951), or Mammootty, Indian film actor and producer
- Paloli Mohammed Kutty (born 1931), Indian politician
- Rosa Kutty (born 1964), former Indian woman athlete
- V. K. Madhavan Kutty (1934–2005), Indian journalist
- Veloor Krishnan Kutty (1936–2003), Indian satirist
