= Shankar Pamarthy =

Indian caricaturist, cartoonist (born 1968)

Shankar Pamarthy (born 1968) is an Indian caricaturist and cartoonist from Hyderabad.

== Career ==
As of 2010, he was the chief cartoonist for Sakshi, a daily newspaper in Hyderabad published in Telugu.

He has won several national and international prizes in cartoon and caricature contents, both nationally and internationally, including the 2014 Grand Prix World Press Cartoon Award in Portugal.

Pamarthy is the first person in Asia to receive such a prestigious award. He is the only person in India who has received many international awards in cartoon and caricature contests. He has also been invited to serve as jury for several international and national competitions.

His caricatures and cartoons emphasize prominent physical features through exaggeration and charm rather than satire or critique. This style has gained wide acclaim and established his prominence in the field.

Pamarthy has frequent exhibitions nationally and internationally.

=== Books and publications ===
Mahatma Illustrated, a collection of pen-and-ink drawings and caricatures depicting Mahatma Gandhi, was authored by Shankar Pamarthy and published by HYDART, a hybrid gallery, in December 2025. The book was unveiled at hyd.art 2025 in Hyderabad. Tripura Star News reported that the book presents Gandhi's life and legacy through hand-drawn illustrations and explores themes including hope, humour, pain, happiness and peace. Art writer Sushma Sabnis, in a 2026 review for Artehelka, discussed the book as an exploration of the continuing presence and visual representation of Gandhi in public memory.

=== Awards and prizes ===
- Third prize in the Hindustan Times caricature art contest 2000 – India
- First prize in the Tabriz International Cartoon Contest 2005 – Iran
- First prize in the Brazil International Caricature Art Contest 2008 – Brazil
- Best Political Cartoonist Award, Government of Andhra Pradesh 2007 – India
- Third prize in the Mayakamath Memorial Awards for Excellence in Political Cartooning 2008 – India
- First Prize in the Oommen Chandy Caricature Contest 2012 – Kerala, India
- First Prize in the Brazil International Caricature Contest 2013 – Brazil
- Silver Medal in the China Portraiture Contest 2013 – China
- Elected as special jury member for Iran International Caricature Contest 2014 – Iran
- World Press Cartoon Grand Prix Award 2014 – Portugal
- Silver medal in the second International Caricature Art Competition 2015 – China
- First prize in third International Art Festival of Resistance 2015 - Iran
- First prize in the Festival of Humour (Festival Veredas de Humor) – Brazil
- Winner of the Chamber of Municipality of de Humor de Piracicaba 2016 - Brazil
- State award – Government of Telangana State 2016 – India
- Third winner of the Second International Holocaust Caricature Art Contest 2017 – Iran
- Special prize in Trumpism Cartoon & Caricature Contest 2017 – Iran
- Honorable mention in world press cartoon 2017 – Portugal
- Honorable mention in Porto Cartoon 2017 – Portugal
- Special jury member for 11th Tehran International Biennial Cartoon Contest 2017 – Iran
- Honorable mention in Porto cartoon 2018 - Portugal
- Excellent Award in the first International Caricature Portrait Festival 2018 – Beijing, China
- Second prize in The End of Terrorism Cartoon & Caricature Contest 2018 – Iran
- Excellent Award in the first International Portrait Caricature Exhibition 2018 – China

=== Exhibitions ===
- 2005 – Shankar's Making Faces, solo exhibition at Lakshana Art Gallery, Hyderabad
- 2007 – Hyderabad Artists, two-man exhibition at Amaravathi Kalakendra, Hyderabad
- 2009 – Shankar's Caricatures, solo exhibition at Alankritha Art Gallery, Hyderabad
- 2011 – Faces Unmasked, solo exhibition at ICC Gallery, Bangalore
- 2014 – Art@Telangana, group exhibition at Muse Art Gallery, Hyderabad
- 2014 – Art@Telangana, group exhibition at Salarjung Museum, Hyderabad
- 2015 – Art for Cause, group exhibition organized by Gallery Space, Hyderabad
- 2015 – Art Fete 2015, platinum-jubilee celebrations by the Hyderabad Art Society, Muse Art Gallery, Hyderabad
- 2016 – Hyderabad Art Festival, 75 years, platinum celebrations organized by the Hyderabad Art Society, Hyderabad
- 2016 – Art for Impact by Dr. Reddy's Foundation in association with Gallery Space at the Avasa Hotel, Hyderabad
- 2019 – The Inked-Image, exhibition of cartoons and caricatures at Ravindra Bharathi, Kala Bhavan, Hyderabad

=== Collections ===
- Abdul Kalam, former president of India
- Google India, Hyderabad
- K. Chandrashekar Rao (KCR), former Chief Minister of Telangana
- Padmashri Jagdish Mittal, art collector
- Chiranjeevi, film actor and politician
- Private collections in India and abroad
