= Sumanta Baruah =

Indian cartoonist

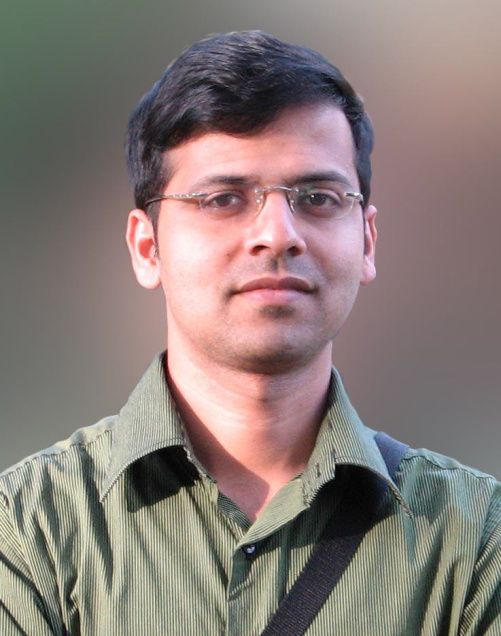
Sumanta baruah

Sumanta Baruah is a cartoonist from India. His cartoons have been published in Current Science, Science Reporter, Resonance, Vigyan Jeuti, Drishti, Satsori, Journal of Assam Science Society, Prantik, Gonit Sora, Enajori and xahitya.org. His cartoons have been exhibited in two International Cartoon Festivals: 3rd Rhodes International Cartoon Exhibition, Greece (2006) and International Cartoon Festival, Iran (2006).

== Creations ==
Sumanta draws cartoons on various topics of science, environment, mathematics, politics and society.
