= Kerala Cartoon Academy =

Organization of cartoonists in Kerala, India

The Kerala Cartoon Academy is an organization of cartoonists in Kerala, India. It includes free-lancers recognized by the Kerala State Government. The Academy has a membership of more than 100 professional cartoonists. Since its inception in 1982, the Academy has been holding camps/workshops, exhibitions, seminars, study tours, festivals and competitions. More than 600 such camps/workshops have been organized so far.

Kerala has had cartooning for nearly 90 years and is known for exporting considerable cartooning manpower to the national capital. However, it took a long while for local cartoonists to find a forum to get together. The first effort to organize Kerala's cartoonists happened in 1967. Kutty, Manthri, Shivaram, Thomas, and Artist Raghavan Nair formed an association for cartoonists. Though it took off with a great vision, it was short-lived. But the spirit of the movement survived, and in 1981 a platform for cartoonists came into existence under the leadership of Shivaram, Thomas, Yesudasan, Toms, Gafoor, Seeri, and Nathan among others. That was the Kerala Cartoon Academy. Over the years, it has grown to voice the concerns of cartooning nationwide though its activities are largely confined to Kerala.

The Academy is not just an organization by cartoonists for cartoonists. It reaches out to the public through cartoon shows and interactive programmes. In the evolving democracy that India is, the Academy feels that the probing satirical medium has a special place in the public mind.
