= Manjul =

Indian cartoonist (born 1971)

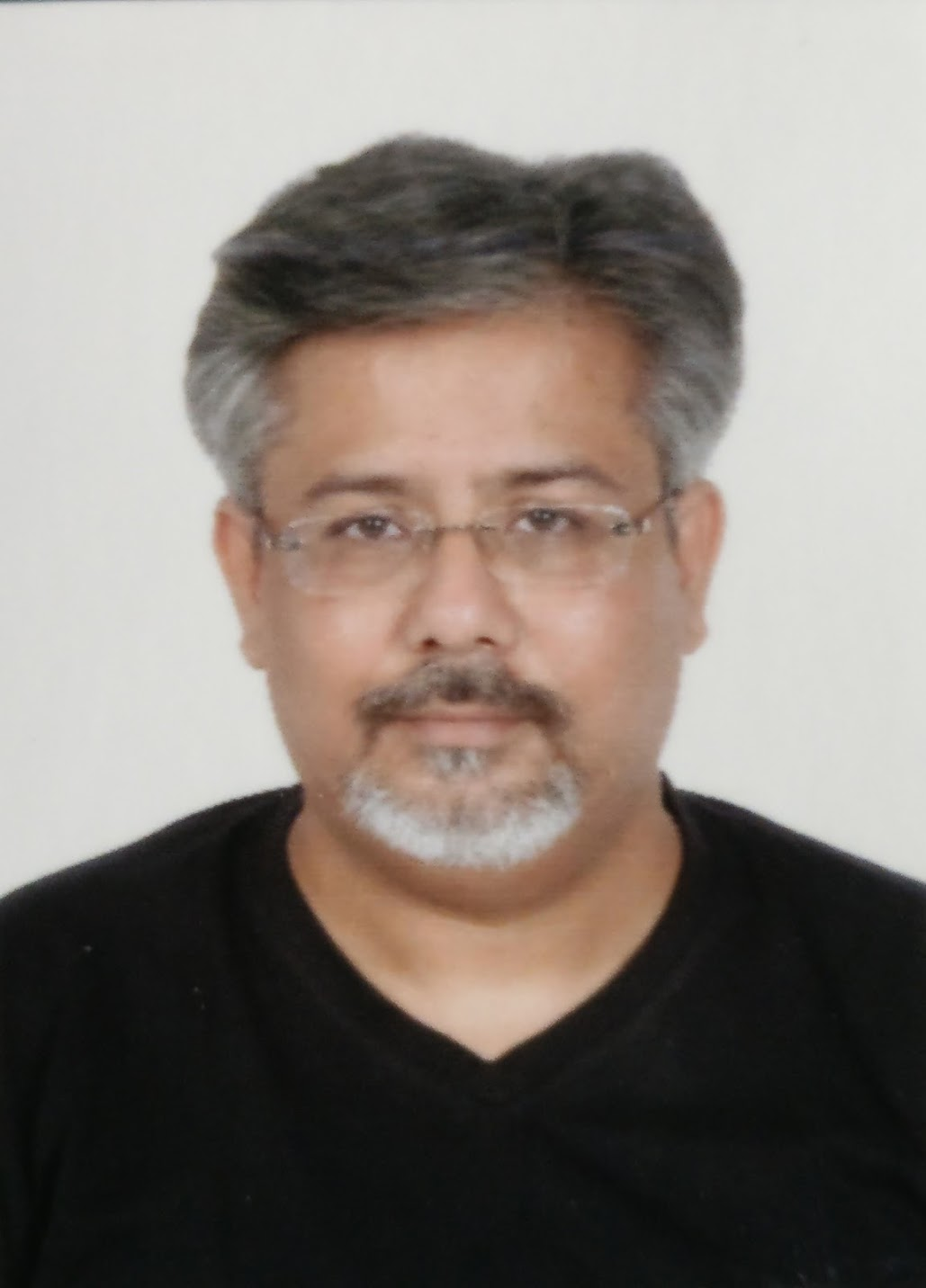
- Cartoonist Manjul
- Born: 1971 (age 54–55)
- Occupation: Cartoonist
- Writing career
- Pen name: MANJUL
- Genre: Political cartoons
- Website: www.manjul.com

Manjul (born 1971) is an Indian political cartoonist. After working with major Indian publications like Dainik jagran, Rashtriya Sahara, Financial Express, India Today, The Economic Times and Daily News and Analysis currently he is contributing for various Indian publications & websites. He is also a winner of Maya Kamath Memorial Awards for Excellence in Cartooning 2009.

Manjul awarded Newsmakers Achievers Awards in 2022.

== Work ==
=== Cartoons ===
- Irregular, Daily pocket cartoon column about political & social events appears in Daily News and Analysis
- Nobody's Business, Daily pocket cartoon column about office humour appears in DNA Money, Daily News and Analysis
- Toon In, Twice a week editorial cartoon column appears in Daily News and Analysis
- Like That Only, Once a week comic strip appears in Daily News and Analysis, Saturday edition
- Politickle, Once a week display cartoon appears in Daily News and Analysis, Sunday edition
- First Cut, Daily editorial cartoon in FirstPost.
- Mumbai Meri Jaan, Daily cartoon in Mid-Day.
- Syndicated cartoons in various newspapers.

=== Books ===
- Ajit Ninan; Sudeep Chakravarti, eds. (2000). The India today book of cartoons. India Today Group. ISBN 0-670-88271-2.
