= Maya Kamath =

Indian cartoonist (1951–2001)

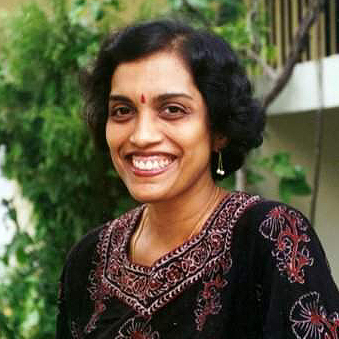
- Born: 12 March 1951; Bombay, India
- Died: 26 October 2001 (aged 50)
- Occupations: Cartoonist, illustrator
- Known for: MKMA
- Spouse: Amarnath Kamath

Maya Kamath (1951-2001) was an Indian cartoonist.

Born in Bombay, India, Kamath spent her formative years in Delhi, and acquired an MA in English literature. Drawing was a childhood hobby and she became an illustrator with Macmillan publishers and a drawing teacher at Sophia's School. It was the sight of sketches in a book titled For Better or for Worse, by Lynn Johnston, that inspired her to draw cartoons.

Kamath's career as a cartoonist began in 1985 with The Evening Herald a publication of the Deccan Herald group. She later worked for Indian newspapers such as The Indian Express, The Asian Age and The Times of India. She also contributed environmental cartoons in a German collection called Third World. In October 1998, the Karnataka Cartoonists' Association presented her with an award at their 7th Cartoonists' Conference.

Her collection is currently with SPARROW link below and has been published as The World of MAYA.

At the time of her death Kamath was India's only female political cartoonist.

== Maya Kamath Memorial Award ==
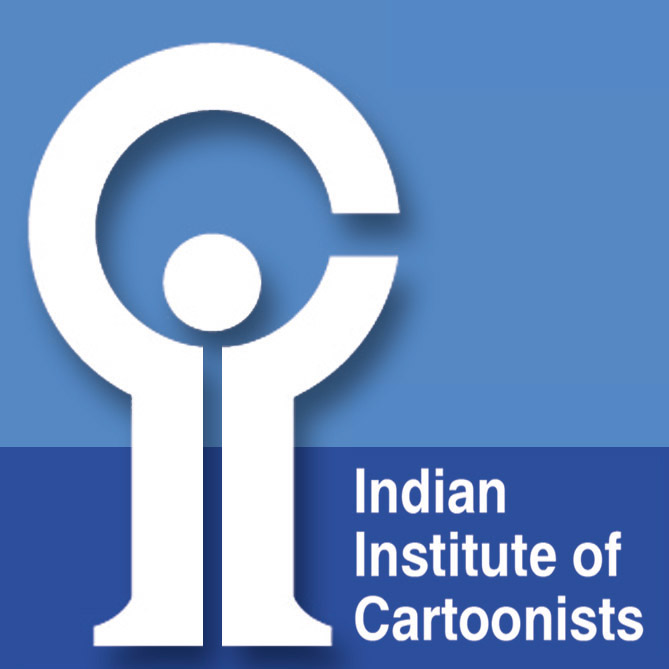
Logo of MKMA: IIC.

Kamath died at the age of 50. Her husband, Amarnath Kamath, instituted the annual Maya Kamath Memorial Award (MKMA : 2008-2021) in 2008 under the aegis of the Indian Institute of Cartoonists. The award lasts till 2021. It recognises excellence in cartooning and is followed by an exhibition of the cartoons at the Indian Cartoon Gallery.
