= Shankar's Weekly =

Indian satirical magazine (1948–75)

- Cover art of the last issue of Shankar's Weekly
- Editor: Keshav Shankar Pillai
- Frequency: Weekly
- Founder: Keshav Shankar Pillai
- Founded: 1948; 77 years ago
- Final issue: 31 August 1975; 49 years ago
- Country: India
- Based in: New Delhi
- Language: English
- OCLC: 1774460

Shankar's Weekly was an Indian satirical magazine published between 1948 and 1975. It was founded and run by Keshav Shankar Pillai, a pioneering political cartoonist. The magazine has been compared to the UK's Punch.

The weekly printed its first issue in 1948 after Pillai left the Hindustan Times following pressure from Times editor Devdas Gandhi to stop publishing cartoons critical of C. Rajagopalachari, a prominent Congress leader. The magazine was launched by Indian Prime Minister Jawaharlal Nehru, with whom Pillai shared a close friendship, even though Pillai described the magazine as "fundamentally anti-establishment".

Shankar's Weekly became a platform for aspiring cartoonists across the country. Prominent cartoonists who published in the weekly include R K Laxman, Rajinder Puri, Kevy, Kutty, Bal Thackeray and Yesudasan. The magazine invited contributions from readers in a designated space. Many cartoonists, such as E. P. Unny, published through the readers' column. According to Unny, Shankar's Weekly was the "homing ground for the second generation of Indian political cartoons". Shankar allowed a variety of styles to function together despite himself being a very powerful leader with certainty for the craft. There was no common house style; a variety of personal styles were created by the cartoonists. In 1975, two weeks into The Emergency, the magazine shut down after having run for 27 years. According to the founder, the Emergency was not the cause of the closure. Prime Minister Indira Gandhi wrote a letter to Pillai on hearing of the closure, stating she will "miss the journal".
