= Abu Abraham =

Indian cartoonist and author

- Born: Attupurathu Mathew Abraham; 11 June 1924 Mavelikara, Travancore, British India
- Died: 1 December 2002 (aged 78)
- Area: Cartoonist
- Pseudonym: Abu

Attupurathu Mathew Abraham (11 June 1924 – 1 December 2002), better known by his pen name Abu, was an Indian cartoonist, journalist, and author. In a career spanning more than four decades, he worked for various publications in India and Britain, including The Bombay Chronicle, Shankar's Weekly, Blitz, Tribune, The Observer (1956–1966), The Guardian (1966–1969), and The Indian Express (1969–1981).

He was a lifelong atheist and rationalist.

== Early years ==
Born in Mavelikara, Kerala as the son of A.M. Mathew and Kantamma, Abu started drawing cartoons at the age of 3. After studying French, Mathematics, and English at University College, Thiruvananthapuram (Trivandrum) and being the tennis champion, he graduated in 1945.

== Work in London ==
In 1953, he met Fred Joss of the London Star, who encouraged him to move to London. At 32, Abu arrived in London in the summer of 1953 and immediately sold cartoons to Punch magazine and the Daily Sketch and started to contribute material to Everybodys' London Opinion and Eastern World using the pen name 'Abraham'. In 1956, after two cartoons were published in Tribune, he was sent a personal letter by David Astor, the editor of The Observer, the world's oldest Sunday newspaper, offering him a permanent job as its first ever political cartoonist. Astor asked Abu to change his pen name as 'Abraham' would imply a false slant on his cartoons, and so he settled on 'Abu', a schoolboy nickname of his.

He was described in The Guardian as "the conscience of the Left and the pea under the princess's mattress". He also produced reportage drawings from around the world. In 1962 in Cuba he drew Che Guevara and spent three hours in a nightclub with Fidel Castro.

== Return to India ==
He returned to India with his first wife (Sarojini, from Tamil Nadu, who he later divorced) and two daughters, Ayisha and Janaki, in 1969 to work as the political cartoonist on the Indian Express until 1981. In 1970 he was given a special award by the British Film Institute for a short film based on Noah's Ark called No Arks. From 1972 until 1978, he was nominated a member of the Rajya Sabha, the upper house of the Indian Parliament.

In 1975 Indian Emergency was declared and the freedom of the press was suspended, and Abu fell out of favour with Indira Gandhi. The direct result of this was the publication of the book Games of the Emergency in 1977, which contained the political articles and cartoons that he could not print during the Emergency. As well as illustrating other books, other collections of his cartoons were Abu on Bangladesh (1972), Private View (1974), and Arrivals and Departures (1983). He also edited the Penguin Book of Indian Cartoons (1988).

From 1981, Abu worked as a freelancer, syndicating his work to several newspapers and commencing a new strip cartoon, Salt and Pepper. The crow and the elephant in this philosophical strip begin to take over from the political cartoons, according to his daughter Ayisha Abraham. In 1988 Abu moved back to Kerala. He died on 1 December 2002 and was survived by his British-born wife Psyche. His death was marked by a two-minute silence in the Rajya Sabha and he was cremated with full state honours.
