= Rajinder Puri =

Indian cartoonist (1934–2015)

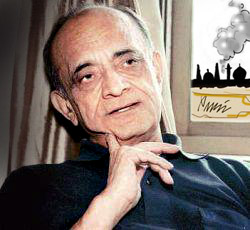

Founder General Secretary of the Janata Party
- In office 1977–1988

Personal details
- Born: 20 September 1934 Karachi (now in Pakistan)
- Died: 16 February 2015 (aged 80) Delhi, India
- Profession: Journalist cartoonist political activist
- Website: http://rajinderpuri.com/

Rajinder Puri (1934–2015), was an Indian cartoonist, veteran columnist and political activist. He was on the staff of The Hindustan Times and The Statesman as a cartoonist and writer. Later, his column appeared in Outlook.

Puri was born on 20 September 1934 in Karachi, now in Pakistan. His family settled in Delhi after the partition. He drew cartoons for The Statesman in 1956–57, after which he went to London, where he drew cartoons briefly for The Manchester Guardian and The Glasgow Herald (1958–59). He returned to India to become cartoonist for the Hindustan Times from 1959 to 1967. He started working as a columnist and freelancer after this stint. From 1972 to 1977, he was the editor and proprietor of Stir Weekly.

An early critic of the Congress and a fierce opponent of Indira Gandhi, Puri moved into politics in 1977, becoming the founding General Secretary of the Janata Party. He was later associated with some of the parties that splintered from the Janata Party: the Lok Dal and the BJP, but was not attached to any political party after 1988.

Puri died in his sleep on 16 February 2015 at the age of 80.

== Bibliography ==
- India 1969: a crisis of conscience (1971)
- India, the wasted years: 1969–1975 (Chetana Publications, 1975)
- Government that works-- and how! (Scan Publishers, 1989)
- Recovery of India (Har-Anand Publications, 1992)
- Bull's Eye (Hope India Publications, 2004)
- A tale of two countries: chronicles of a columnist, 2004–2008 (Har-Anand Publications, 2008)
