= Carlos Latuff =

Brazilian political cartoonist (born 1968)

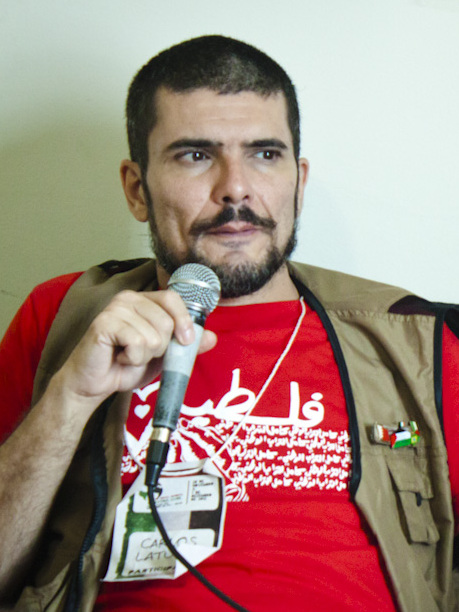
- Latuff in 2012
- Born: 30 November 1968 (age 57); Rio de Janeiro, Brazil
- Known for: Political cartoons

Carlos Latuff (born 30 November 1968) is a Brazilian political cartoonist. His work deals with themes such as anti-Western sentiment, anti-capitalism, and opposition to U.S. military intervention in foreign countries. He is best known for his images depicting the Israeli–Palestinian conflict and the Arab Spring.

Latuff's cartoons comparing Israel to Nazi Germany have been labelled as antisemitic by some advocacy organisations and scholars. Latuff said the characterization was "a strategy for discrediting criticism of Israel".

== Early life ==
Latuff was born in the São Cristóvão neighbourhood of Rio de Janeiro, Brazil, and is of Lebanese descent. He has stated that his Arab roots drove him to advocate for Arab causes, including the Palestinian cause.

== History ==
Latuff's career began in 1990, as a cartoonist for leftist publications in Brazil. After watching a 1997 documentary about the Zapatistas in Mexico, he sent a couple of cartoons to them, and received a positive response. He has stated that after this experience, he decided to start a website and engage in "artistic activism". Graham Fowell, ex-chairman of the Cartoonists' Club of Great Britain, has compared his work to that of Banksy, the English-based graffiti artist.

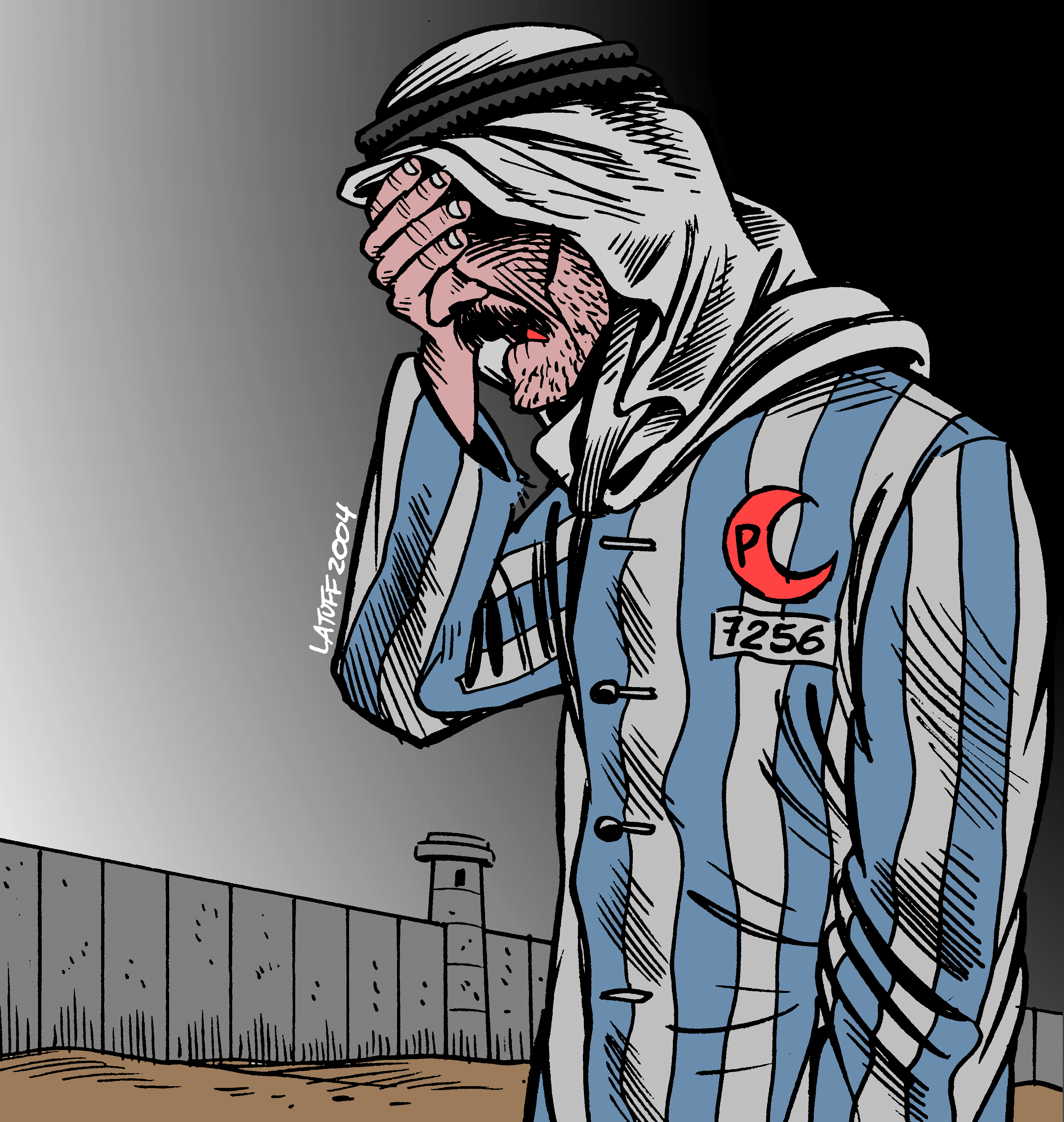
Latuff's cartoon comparing a Palestinian prisoner to prisoners in the Nazi Auschwitz concentration camp won second place at the 2006 Iranian International Holocaust Cartoon Competition.

Latuff won second place in the 2006 Iranian International Holocaust Cartoon Competition, for which he won a prize of US$8,000, shared with far-right French cartoonist Chard. The latter would turn the prize down, claiming her cartoon, which openly denies the Holocaust, was entered without consent. Manfred Gerstenfeld cited Latuff's cartoon as an example of Holocaust inversion among the competition's entries.

In 2011, Latuff was contacted by activists in Egypt. Latuff has stated that he was encouraged when he saw some of his cartoons depicted in the January 25 Egyptian protests, a couple of days after he made them. According to Reuters, this helped him become "a hero of the tumultuous Arab Spring with rapid-fire satirical sketches".

Latuff has been arrested at least three times in Brazil for his cartoons about the Brazilian police, whom he has criticized for police brutality.

== Published works ==
Latuff's works have often been self-published on Indymedia websites and private blogs. He is a weekly cartoonist for The Globe Post and some of his cartoons have been featured in magazines such as the Brazilian edition of Mad, Le Monde Diplomatique and the Mondoweiss website. In addition, a few of his works were published on Arab websites and publications such as the Islamic Front for the Iraqi Resistance (JAMI) magazine, the Saudi magazine Character, the Lebanese newspaper Al Akhbar, among others. Additionally, Latuff also contributes to several Middle Eastern newspapers, including Alquds Alarabi, Huna Sotak and the Islamophobia Research and Documentation Project – IRDP. In 2019 a selection of his cartoons was published in the book Drawing Attention to the Israeli-Palestinian Conflict: Political Cartoons by Carlos Latuff. His work is also published on the Chinese Twitter account Valiant Panda heavily shared by Chinese state affiliated media, government officials, and embassies.

== Themes ==
Latuff has produced numerous cartoons related to the Israeli–Palestinian conflict, which assumed significance for the cartoonist after a visit to the region in the late 1990s. His cartoons are highly critical of Israel.

Latuff's work has also been critical of the US military action in Iraq and in Afghanistan. He began to publish his work on the web from the earliest stages of the invasion.

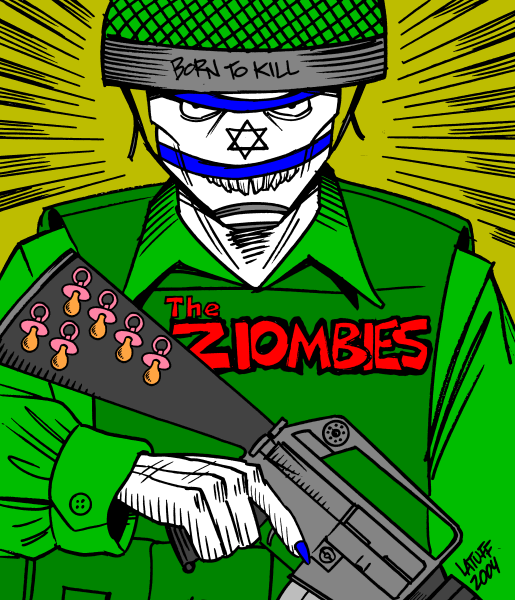

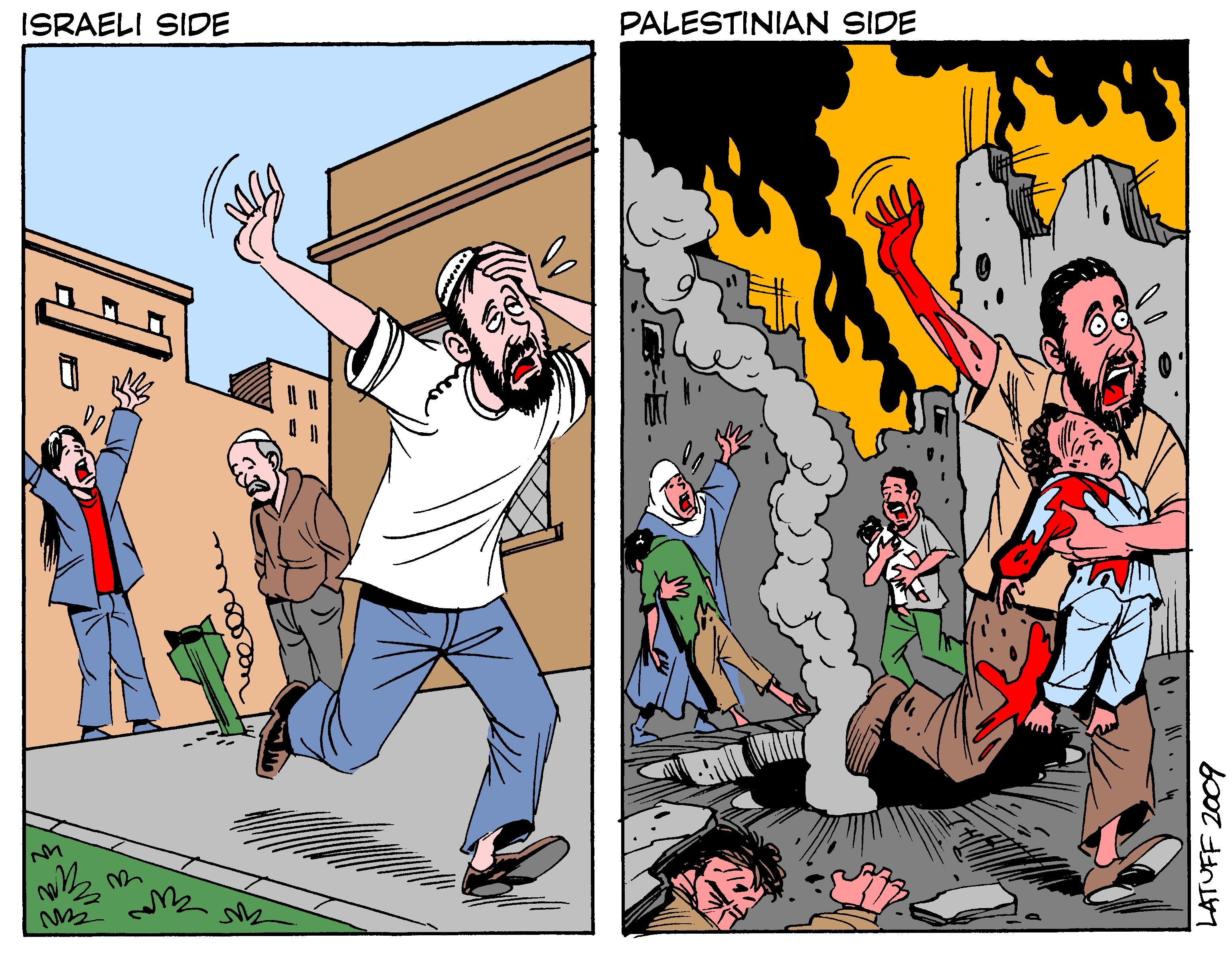

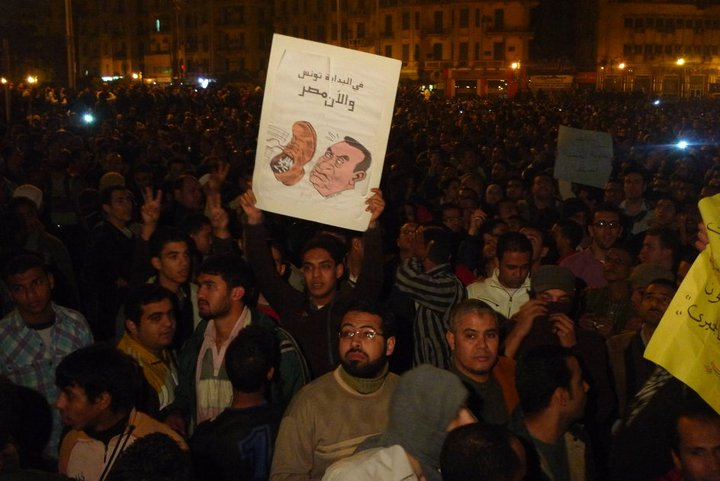

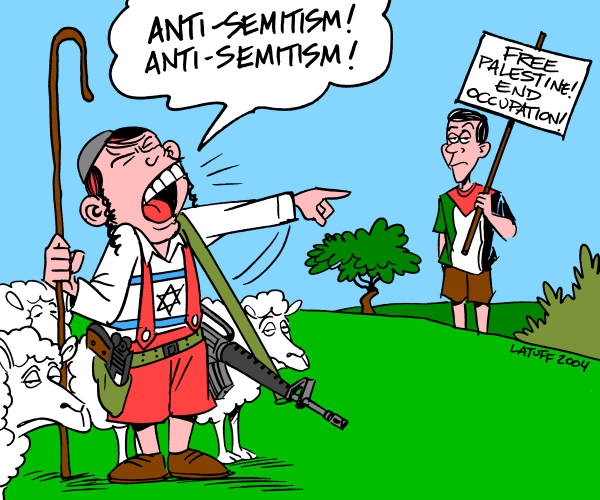

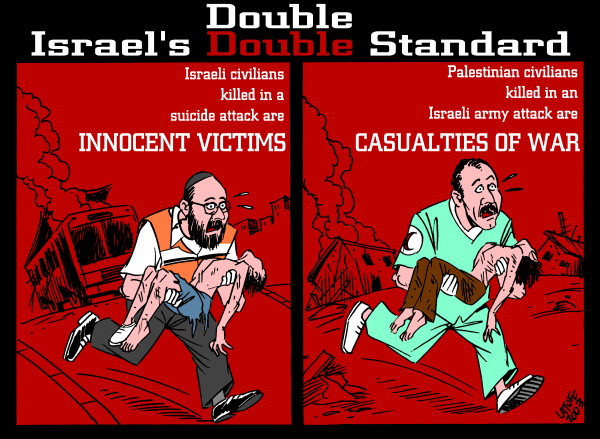

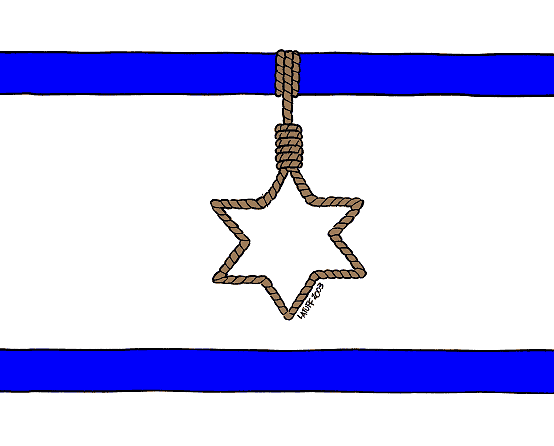

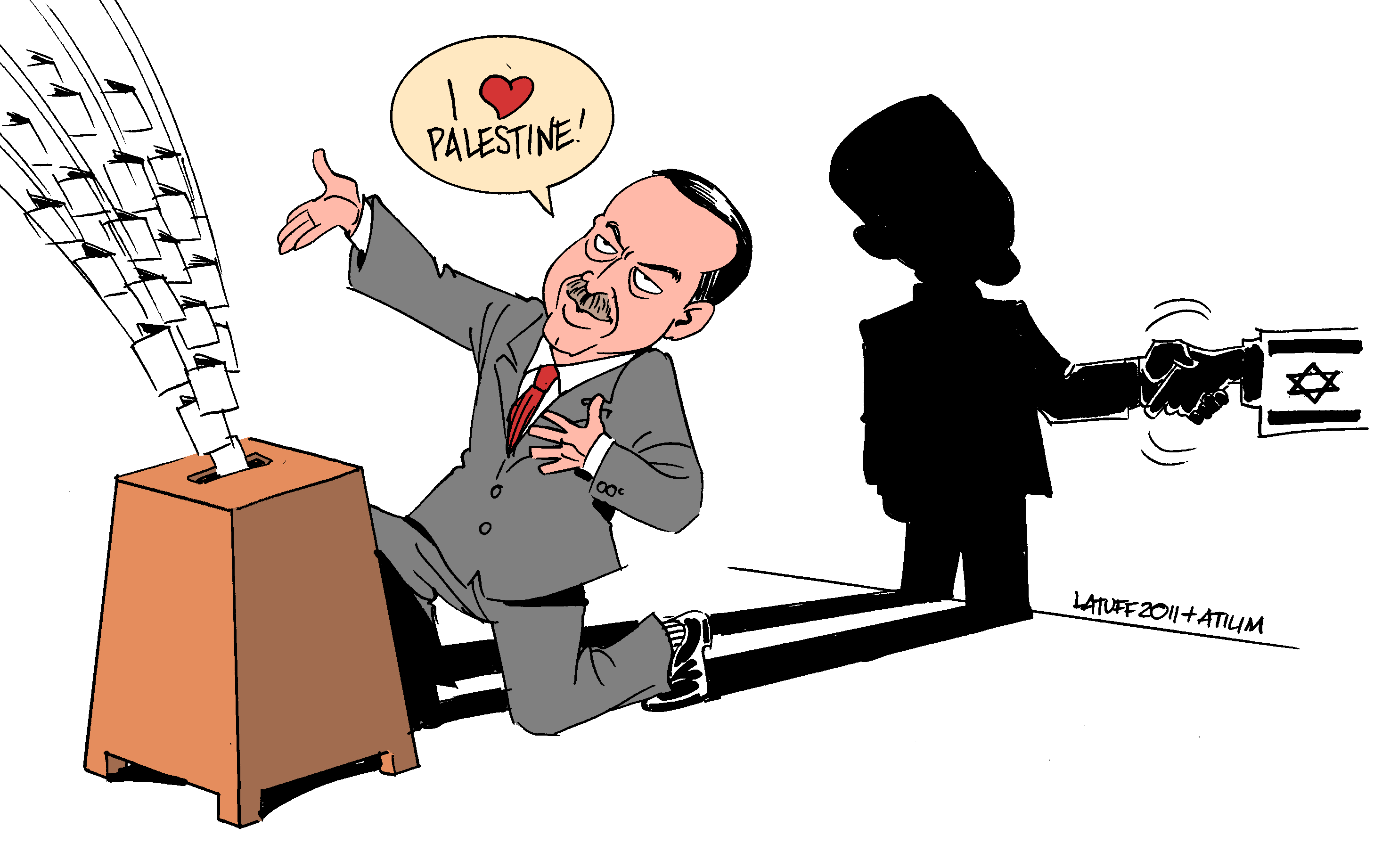

Since the end of 2010, he has been engaged in producing cartoons about the Arab Spring in which he sided with the revolutionaries. His cartoons on the Egyptian Revolution of 2011 were enlarged and carried by the Egyptian demonstrators. After the victory of revolutions in Tunisia, Egypt and Libya his cartoons about these countries have focused on the menace of counter-revolution or Western interference. Some of his cartoons have been displayed in mass demonstrations in Arab countries.

== Allegations of antisemitism ==
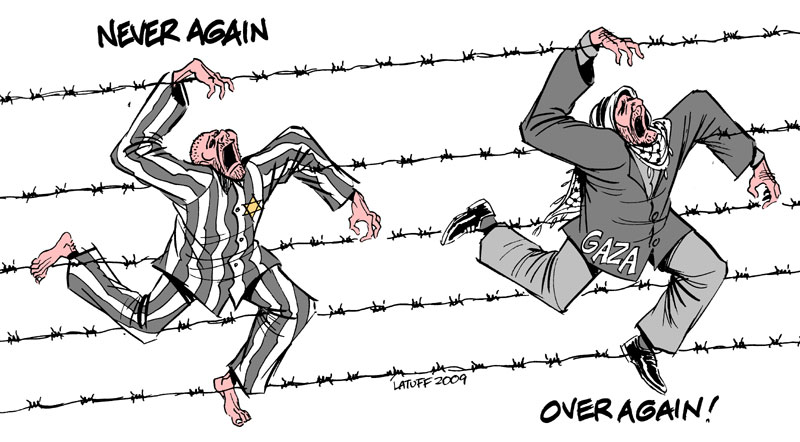
Latuff's "Holocaust Remembrance Day" was offered as material for teacher training on a website of the Education Ministry of Belgium's Flemish Region. It first appeared at a Holocaust denial conference in Tehran in 2009, according to Joods Actueel, which said it was removed shortly after their article was published.

In 2002 the Swiss-based Holocaust survivors' organization Aktion Kinder des Holocaust sued the Indymedia of Switzerland on the charge of antisemitism for publishing Latuff's cartoon titled We are all Palestinians series in their website, which depicted a Jewish boy in the Warsaw Ghetto saying: "I am Palestinian." The criminal proceedings were suspended by Swiss court.

Eddy Portnoy, in The Forward, reviewing the book in 2008, wrote that Latuff's material is "often terribly obnoxious... but it is a stretch to categorize his cartoons as antisemitic."

Rusi Jaspal cited Latuff as an example of political cartoonists who "make use of existing anti-Semitic social representations (e.g., that Jews are evil) in order to derogate Israelis." German historian Juliane Wetzel wrote in 2017 that Latuff "employs classic antisemitic motifs in order to discredit Israel" in his cartoons. Cary Nelson analyzed a cartoon of Latuff's depicting a distressed Palestinian woman facing a line of large coronaviruses, captioned "Israel and coronavirus unite against occupied native Palestinians", as an example of antisemitic conspiracism related to the COVID-19 pandemic. Israeli cartoonist Michel Kichka described Latuff in 2012 as "a good cartoonist, not very subtle. And a well-know antisemite." British scholar of antisemitism David Hirsh also identified Latuff as an antisemite, in 2015. Alan Johnson used Latuff's cartoons as a further example of "antisemitism that comes dressed up as anti-Zionism" while discussing Tony Greenstein's description of "the false antisemitism narrative" as being "like a multi headed hydra."

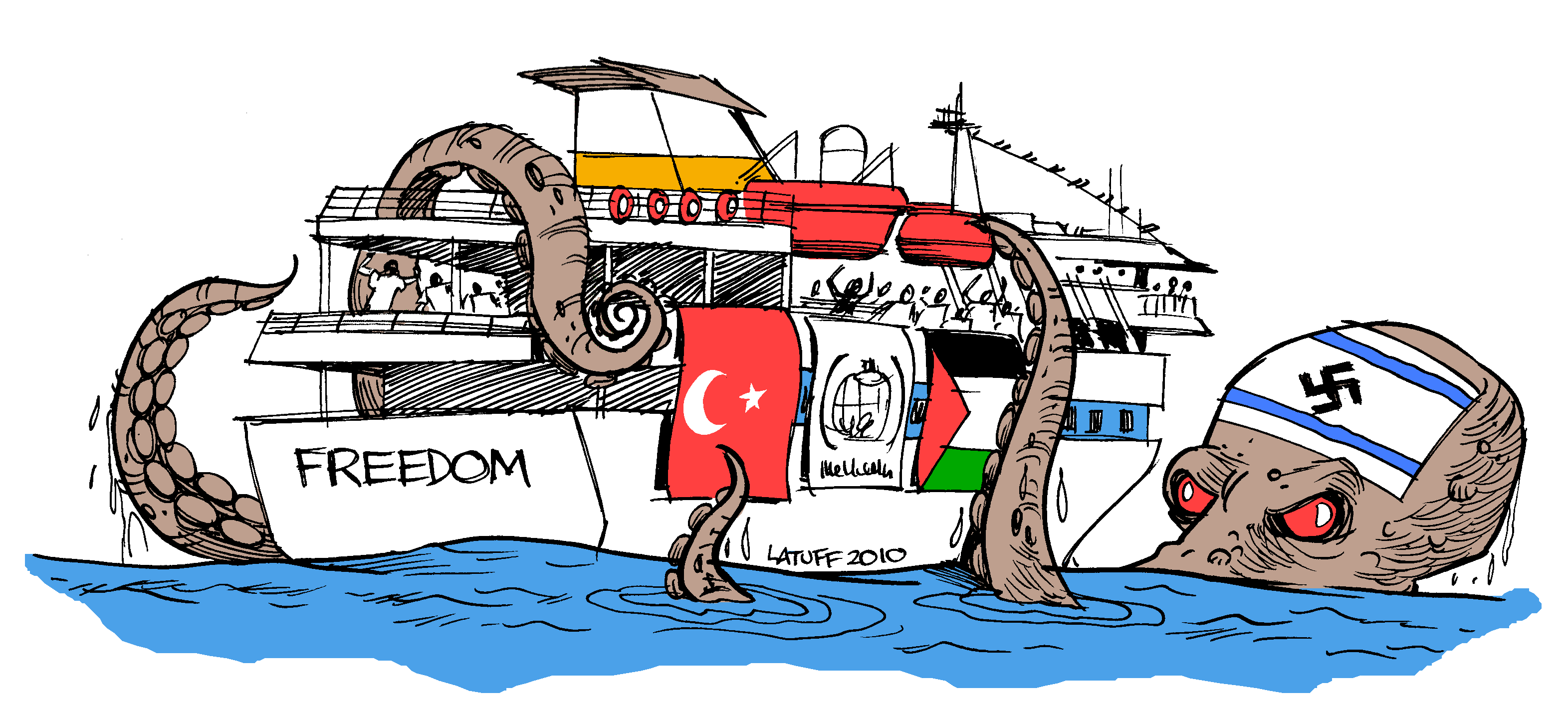
The Israeli embassy in Egypt issued a complaint to an Egyptian newspaper that published this cartoon, identifying it as an antisemitic caricature.

In 2010, the Israeli embassy in Egypt sent a complaint to an Egyptian newspaper that published a cartoon by Latuff depicting the Gaza Freedom Flotilla "being grabbed by an octopus carrying an Israeli flag with a Nazi swastika in place of the Star of David symbol". A spokeswoman for the embassy described it as an antisemitic caricature.

=== Latuff's response ===
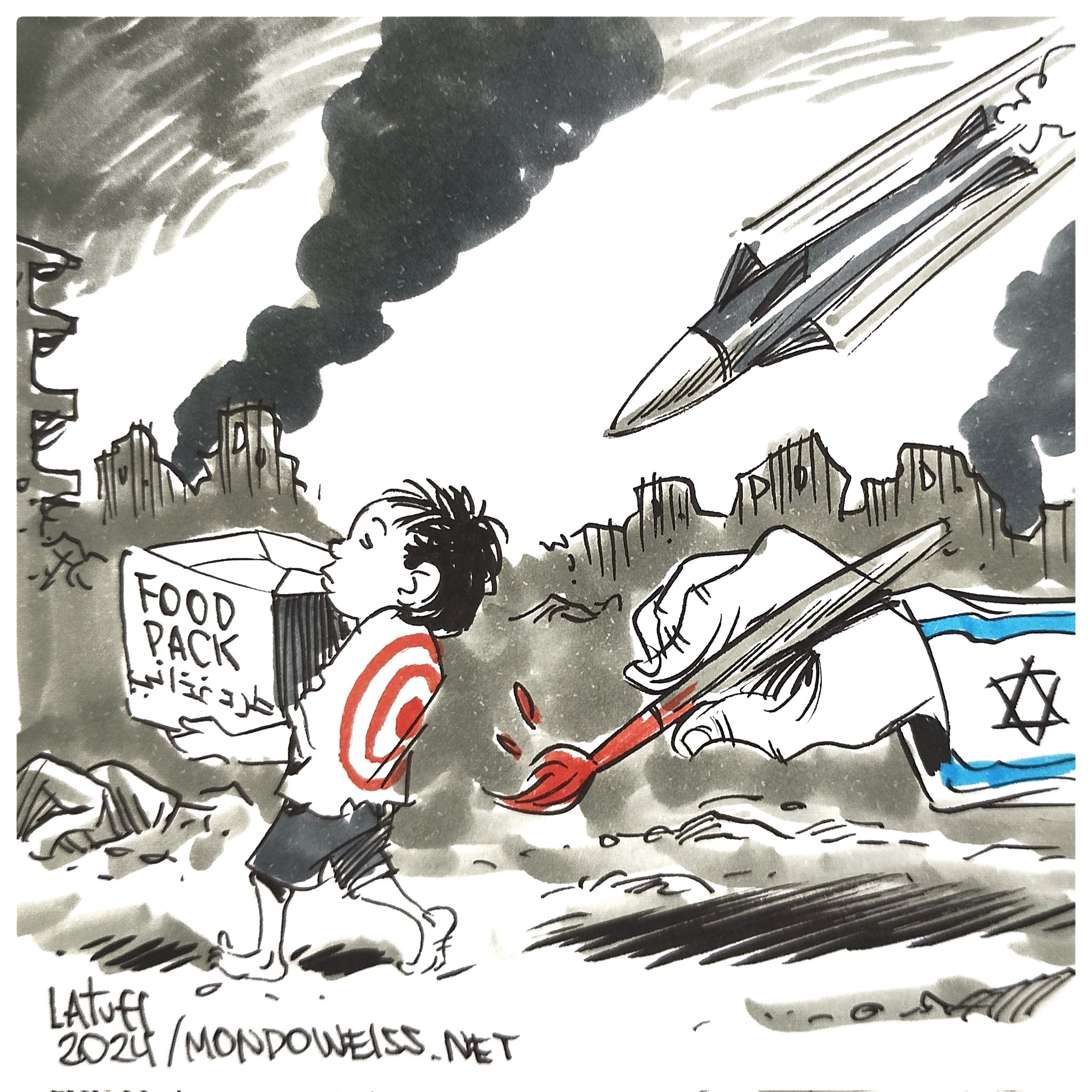
Cartoon by Carlos Latuff criticizing the Flour Massacre

Latuff, in an interview with the Jewish-American weekly newspaper The Forward in December 2008, responded to charges of antisemitism and the comparisons made between his cartoons and those published in Der Stürmer in Nazi Germany:

My cartoons have no focus on the Jews or on Judaism. My focus is Israel as a political entity, as a government […] It happens to be Israeli Jews that are the oppressors of Palestinians […] My detractors say that the use of the Magen David in my Israel-related cartoons is irrefutable proof of antisemitism; however, it's not my fault if Israel chose sacred religious motifs as national symbols […]

Latuff stated that, while antisemites do "hijack" the Palestinian cause to "bash Jews", the equivocation of anti-Zionism with antisemitism is "a well-known tactic of intellectual dishonesty". He said that political cartoonists work by metaphors, and that similarities can be found between the IDF treatment of Palestinians and what Jews experienced under the Nazis.

Latuff was included in Simon Wiesenthal Center's 2012 "Top Ten Anti-Israel/Anti-Semitic Slurs" list, being placed third for depicting Israeli premier Benjamin Netanyahu squeezing votes out of a dead Arab child. Latuff told Brazil's Opera Mundi newspaper that he considered the award "a joke worthy of a Woody Allen movie".

== Publications ==
- Drawing attention to the Israeli-Palestinian Conflict: Political Cartoons by Carlos Latuff, 2019, ISBN 9780993186646.
