= Muhammad cartoon =

Muhammad cartoon may refer to:

- Charlie Hebdo shooting
- Curtis Culwell Center attack
- Everybody Draw Mohammed Day
- Jyllands-Posten Muhammad cartoons controversy
