= International Holocaust Cartoon Competition =

Cartoon competition sponsored by the Iranian newspaper Hamshahri

International Holocaust Cartoon Contest was a 2006 cartoon competition, sponsored by the Iranian newspaper Hamshahri, to denounce what it called Western "double standards on freedom of speech". The event was staged in response to the Jyllands-Posten Muhammad cartoons controversy. The United States State Department, the Israeli Foreign Ministry and United Nations Secretary-General Kofi Annan, among others, strongly criticized the contest.

In January 2015, in the wake of the Charlie Hebdo shooting and the magazine's subsequent decision to publish further cartoons of Muhammad, the Iranian House of Cartoon and the Sarcheshmeh Cultural Complex in Iran announced that they would be sponsoring The 2nd International Holocaust Cartoons Contest. Selected cartoons were exhibited in Tehran beginning on 14 May 2016.

== 2006 competition ==
This cartoon by Abdellah Derkaoui won first prize in the 2006 competition

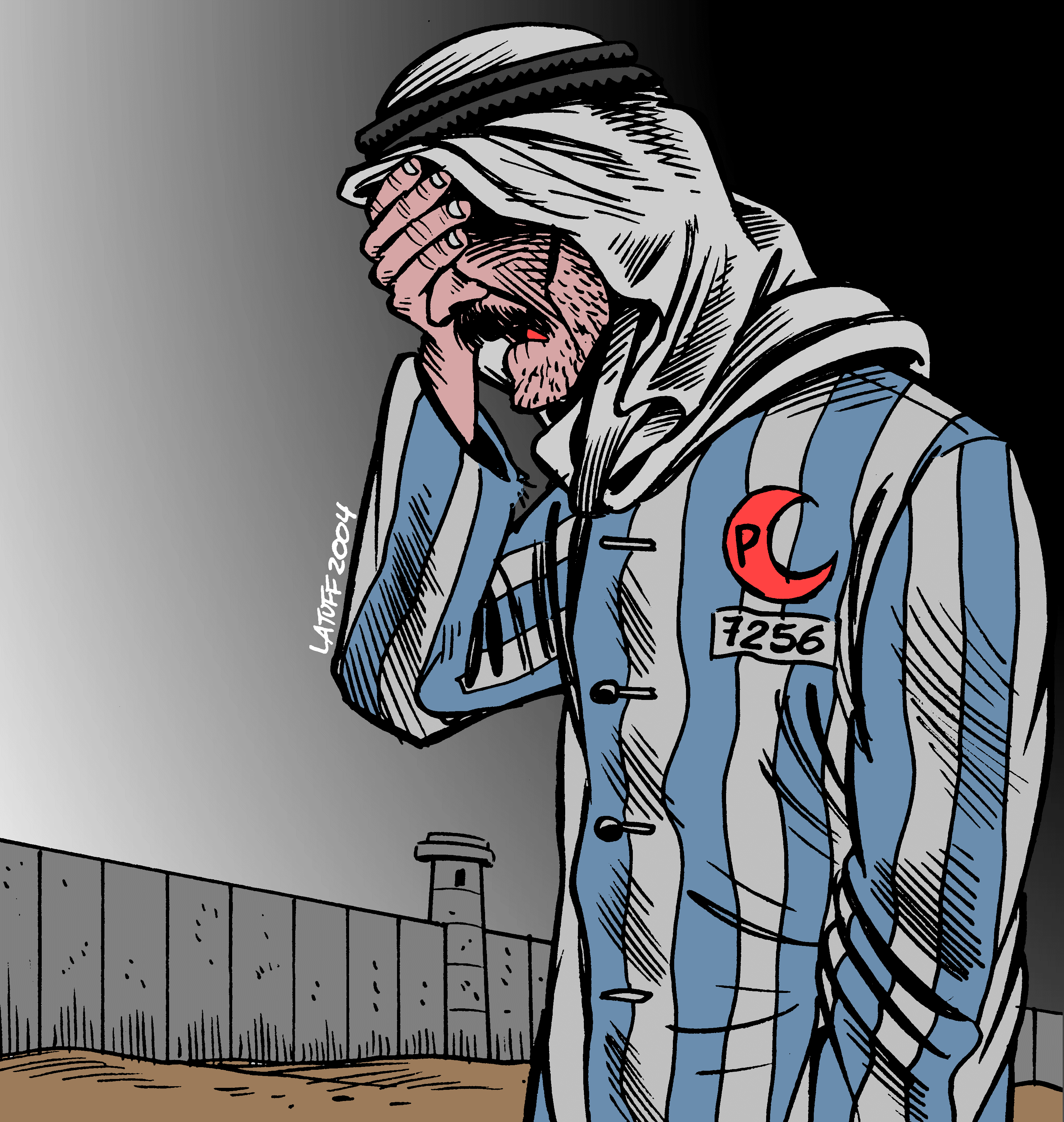
This cartoon by Carlos Latuff won second prize in the 2006 competition

On 6 February 2006, Farid Mortazavi, graphics editor of Hamshahri, announced a competition for cartoons on the Holocaust. 12 best contributions were to be rewarded with a gold coin each, which were later increased to $5,000 to $12,000 prizes for the top three cartoons and three gold coins each for 12 other cartoonists. Later, Hamshahri published an English introduction to the contest, as well as preliminary rules. The contest was created in response to the 12 cartoons published by the Danish newspaper Jyllands-Posten to challenge the championing of freedom of speech in the defense of the Jyllands-Posten cartoons. This was done under the notion that those who supported the Jyllands-Posten's right to free anti-Islamic speech would be placed in a precarious position were they to condemn the antisemitic cartoons targeted at one of the most sensitive of Jewish topics. In that introductory message for the contest, Hamshahri denounced what it called Western hypocrisy on freedom of speech, alleging that "it is impossible in the West to joke upon or even discuss certain topics related to Judaism, such as the Holocaust, and the pretexts for the creation of Israel".

On 14 February 2006, the editor in chief of Hamshahri commented in Persian that "the purpose of establishing such a competition is not to offend or ridicule anyone, but to do a discussion about the realities of the Holocaust". He also indicated that Hamshahri tries really hard not to cause pain for anyone and also added that the newspaper has no contention with the Jews in Iran or any other place, but that it has problems with Zionism. Masood Shojaei, the director of Iran's Caricature House, which co-sponsored the competition, said, "Iran's Caricature House, as the only technically qualified center involved in the competition regards the Holocaust topic as a terrible and saddening issue." The exhibition put on by The Iran Cartoon Organisation and Hamshahri newspaper opened on 14 August 2006.

After the winners were announced in November 2006, Shojaei said that the competition would become an annual event. The Associated Press quoted him as saying, "Actually, we will continue until the destruction of Israel." However, Shojaei categorically denies that he even spoke to the Associated Press reporter.

=== Reactions ===
==== In Iran ====
Conservative newspapers such as Kayhan and Jomhouri Eslami hailed the decision by Hamshahri for the contest, and their cartoonists, such as Maziyar Bizhani, actively entered the competition.

Several reformers criticized the cartoon competition and also the president's statements about the Holocaust. Emadeddin Baghi, a member of the religious-intellectuals circle, Ebrahim Yazdi, the head of Nehzat Azadi Party, Hamid Reza Jalaeipour, a prominent figure of Islamic Iran Participation Front and Sadeq Zibakalam, a prominent political analyst of the Kargozaran party criticized these new policies by calling them "useless, scientifically-baseless and purely political actions which originates from the authorities' lack of historical knowledge". In an interview with BBC News, Nikahang Kowsar, a former cartoonist for Hamshahri, said he thought the competition was the wrong approach. "It's a bad reaction to a bad action coming from the Danish newspaper," he told the BBC. He also claimed in his weblog that Hamshahri cartoonists would have a bad fate if they refused to take part in the competition.

==== In Israel ====
Israeli artists spoofed the contest with the Israeli antisemitic cartoons contest.

==== International ====
On 8 February 2006, Flemming Rose (the cultural editor for Jyllands-Posten), told CNN, "My newspaper is trying to establish a contact with that Iranian newspaper Hamshahri, and we would run the cartoons the same day as they publish them." Later that day, the paper's editor-in-chief said that Jyllands-posten would under no circumstances publish the Holocaust cartoons.

Six of the cartoons of the International Holocaust Cartoon Competition were republished by the Danish newspaper Dagbladet Information on 8 September 2006, after the editor consulted the main rabbi in Copenhagen, and three cartoons were later reprinted in Jyllands-Posten as well.

The event was also criticised by the then United Nations Secretary-General Kofi Annan, the U.S. State Department, the Israeli foreign ministry, Reporters Without Borders, the Anti-Defamation League and other parties.

=== Winners ===
On 1 November 2006, the political cartoonist Abdellah Derkaoui (Arabic: عبدالله درقاوي), a Moroccan, was announced as the winner and received the first prize of US$12,000. Derkaoui's winning cartoon differed from many of the runners-up, in that it did not deny the Holocaust; instead, it used the Holocaust to make a comparison between the actions of Nazi Germany and the contemporary actions of the Israeli government.

The second prize of US$8,000 was split between the Brazilian cartoonist Carlos Latuff and the far-right French cartoonist Chard, although Chard refused the prize, stating that her cartoon was entered into the competition without her consent. According to the Jerusalem Center for Public Affairs, the cartoon by Chard contains explicit Holocaust denial.

Shahram Rezai of Iran won the third prize of US$5,000. In addition to the main prizes, there were also "Special Prizes" of three gold coins awarded to several entries. One of these prizes went to Italy, one prize to Morocco, two to Jordan, one to Syria, two to Brazil and five to Iranians.

== 2016 competition ==
In December 2015, two state-sponsored Iranian cultural organizations, the Owj Media & Art Institute and the Sarcheshmeh Cultural Complex, announced a Holocaust cartoon contest. More than 150 cartoons submitted for the contest were showcased in a May 2016 exhibition in the art section at the Islamic Propaganda Organization in Tehran, as part of Iran's Cartoon Biennial. Following the closing of the Tehran exhibition at the end of May 2016, the Islamic Propaganda Organization sponsored exhibitions of selected cartoons in provincial capitals across the country.

=== Reactions ===
==== In Iran ====
In an April 2016 interview published in the New Yorker, Iranian Foreign Minister Mohammad Javad Zarif tried to distance the Iranian government from the contest, asserting that it did not receive government support or endorsement, and that no official permission was necessary to hold it. Following Zarif's statement, a spokesperson from the Ministry of Culture and Islamic Guidance questioned the Foreign Minister's comments, stating that the Ministry supports any program that will "enlighten people about the Holocaust". The main spokesperson for the contest, Mas'oud Shoja'i Tabataba'i, said that Zarif was not welcome at the exhibition. Zarif was questioned in the Iranian parliament about his negative position on the Holocaust cartoon contest and exhibition three months after its closing. He maintained his belief that Holocaust denial does not benefit the Islamic Republic of Iran and he repeated the claim that the contest was the work of an NGO and not any government agency.

==== International ====
American political cartoonist Daryl Cagle entered a cartoon into the Second Holocaust Cartoon Competition in 2015. The cartoon features Iran's Supreme Leader with his face in the shape of a pair of human buttocks: the face / posterior is farting out the words to his famous statement, "The Holocaust is an event whose reality is uncertain and if it has happened, it's uncertain how it happened."

"I'm guessing the Iranians will not choose to include my cartoon in their exhibition and competition – but considering how the contest organizers complain about the "West" censoring "discussion" of the Holocaust, I thought it was a nice irony to give them a Holocaust cartoon that they would likely censor," wrote Cagle.

Irina Bokova, the director-general of UNESCO, condemned the holding of it: "Such an initiative which aims at a mockery of the genocide of the Jewish people, a tragic page of humanity's history, can only foster hatred and incite to violence, racism and anger. This contest goes against the universal values of tolerance and respect, and runs counter to the action led by UNESCO to promote Holocaust education, to fight anti-Semitism and denial."

=== Winners ===
On 31 May 2016, the French cartoonist Zeon was announced as the winner and received the first prize of US$12,000. He had been arrested by French authorities in March 2015 for antisemitic work that he drew in 2011. His winning work features what appears to be the entry gate of a Nazi-era death camp on top of a cash register with six million in cash inside.

The Indonesian artist Jitet Koestana won the second prize of US$7,000 while Mahmud Nazari from Iran won the third prize of US$5,000. As in the 2006 contest, Special prizes of three gold coins were awarded to several entries. One each of these went to Belgium, Morocco, Turkey and several other countries.

The Belgian winner, Luc Descheemaeker, using the name O-sekoer, is a schoolteacher in a Catholic school in the Flemish city of Torhout. The school and the city felt very honored that he won a prize at that contest. The Flemish press defended him against Jewish organisations condemning the contest. The mayor of Torhout was the Flemish minister of education, Hilde Crevits, who refused to condemn the cartoon. Descheemaeker was consequently nominated cultural ambassador of Torhout. Meanwhile, other antisemitic cartoons drawn by him were discovered.

After the contest, the Iranian House of Cartoon and the Sarcheshmeh Cultural Complex announced another similar contest, this time calling for cartoon submissions on the "Zionist Caliphate" that would focus on "Zionism, terrorism and racism" and "ISIL terrorism and genocide in the name of religion and to the benefit of the Zionists". The deadline for entries was set for 16 June 2016, with the winners to be announced at a later date with cash prizes of up to US$5,000.

== See also ==
- Council for Spreading Mahmoud Ahmadinejad's Thoughts
- Everybody Draw Mohammed Day
- International Conference to Review the Global Vision of the Holocaust
- Israeli Anti-Semitic Cartoons Contest
- The Eternal Jew (art exhibition)
