= Aktion Kinder des Holocaust =

Aktion Kinder des Holocaust ('Action 'Children of the Holocaust'', AKdH) is a Swiss voluntary association founded in 1991. Its principal aim is the documentation of and opposition to antisemitism in Switzerland. It is associated with the University of Basel research projects "VIOLENCE youth" and "Right-wing youths in Switzerland".

Its modus operandi is to contact "insecure adolescents who might be turned from their extremist views" on web forums and chatrooms and to engage them personally, a practice they describe as "Internet Streetworking". It also maintains extensive documentation of antisemitic statements made in Switzerland or on Swiss websites and puts pressure on Internet hosting service providers to terminate offending websites.

Among its activities, in 2002 it criticized the work of Brazilian political cartoonist Carlos Latuff in 2002 for a cartoon depicting a Jewish boy in the Warsaw Ghetto saying "I am Palestinian". In the same year, it sued the Independent Media Center (IMC, also known as Indymedia) of Switzerland on a charge of antisemitism for publishing Latuff's cartoon. The criminal proceedings were suspended by a Swiss court later that year.

Notable supporters listed as members of its patronage committee include Israeli writer Uri Avnery, Swiss writers Peter Bichsel and Mariella Mehr, former chief rabbi of Denmark Bent Melchior, Swiss anti-racist activist Sigi Feigel (d. 2004), and Holocaust survivor Simon Wiesenthal (d. 2005).
