= Holocartoons =

Iranian Holocaust denial website

- Holocartoons
- Website type: Holocaust denial
- Available in: Persian, English, Arabic
- Website: Holocartoons (dead)
- Launched: August 2010

Holocartoons is an Iranian Holocaust denial website launched in August 2010. The site, which opens to the Pink Panther theme song, aims to undermine the historic dimensions of the mass murder of Jews during World War II. The site is based on a comic book written by Omid Mehdinejad and illustrated by Maziar Bijani. In the preface it opens as following:

This book tends to denounce the conspicuous lie of the "planed [sic] murder of 6 million Jews during the Second World War" allegedly called "Holocaust".

== Reactions ==
On August 5, 2010, Yad Vashem, issued a statement calling the site "The latest salvo emanating from Iran that denies the facts of the Holocaust and attempts to influence those who are ignorant of history."

== See also ==
- Holocaust denial
- Iran–Israel relations
