= Everybody Draw Mohammed Day =

2010 event supporting depicting Muhammad

Cartoon, "Everybody Draw Mohammed Day!"

Everybody Draw Mohammed Day (or Draw Mohammed Day) was a 2010 event in support of artists threatened with violence for drawing representations of the Islamic prophet Muhammad. It stemmed from a protest against censorship of the American television show South Park episode "201", led by the show's distributor Comedy Central, in response to death threats that had been made against some of those responsible for two segments broadcast in April 2010. A drawing representing Muhammad was posted on the Internet on April 20, 2010, with a message suggesting that "everybody" create a drawing depicting Muhammad on May 20 in support of free speech.

U.S. cartoonist Molly Norris of Seattle, Washington, created the artwork in reaction to Internet death threats that had been made against animators Trey Parker and Matt Stone for depicting Muhammad in an episode of South Park. Postings on RevolutionMuslim.com (under the pen name Abu Talha al-Amrikee, later identified as Zachary Adam Chesser) had said that Parker and Stone could wind up like Theo van Gogh, a Dutch filmmaker who was stabbed and shot to death.

Norris claimed that if people draw pictures of Muhammad, Islamist terrorists would not be able to murder them all, and threats to do so would become unrealistic. Within a week, Norris' idea became popular on Facebook, was supported by numerous bloggers, and generated coverage on the blog websites of major U.S. newspapers. As the publicity mounted, Norris and the man who created the first Facebook page promoting the May 20 event disassociated themselves from it. Nonetheless, planning for the protest continued with others "taking up the cause". Facebook had an "Everybody Draw Mohammed Day" page, which grew to over 100,000 participants (101,870 members by May 20). A protest page on Facebook against the initiative named "Against 'Everybody Draw Mohammed Day'" attracted slightly more supporters (106,000 by May 20). Subsequently, Facebook was temporarily blocked by Pakistan; the ban was lifted after Facebook agreed to block the page for users in India and Pakistan.

In the media, Everybody Draw Mohammed Day attracted support from commentators who felt that the campaign represented important issues of freedom of speech, and the need to stand up for this freedom. It also drew criticism from commentators who found the campaign to be crass and intentionally provocative.

== History ==
=== Background ===
South Park episodes "200" and "201", broadcast in April 2010, featured a character in a bear costume, about whom various other characters stated was Muhammad. The South Park episode sparked statements from the criminal extremist website Revolution Muslim, which posted a picture of the partially decapitated body of the Dutch filmmaker, Theo van Gogh, with a statement declaring that Parker and Stone could meet a similar fate. The group running the website said it was not threatening Parker and Stone, but it also posted the addresses of Comedy Central's New York office and the California production studio where South Park is made. Comedy Central self-censored the episode when it was broadcast by removing the word "Muhammad" and a speech about intimidation and fear from the South Park episode.

=== Molly Norris cartoon ===
Molly Norris drew the original, poster-like cartoon on April 20, 2010, which declared May 20, 2010, to be the first annual "Everybody Draw Mohammed Day". The drawing showed various anthropomorphized objects, including a coffee cup, a cherry, and a box of pasta, each claiming to be the likeness of Muhammad. Norris used an alternative transliteration of "Mohammed" on her poster. Across the top of the illustration, she wrote:

In light of the recent veiled (ha!) threats aimed at the creators of the television show South Park ... by bloggers on Revolution Muslim's website, we hereby deem May 20, 2010, as the first 'Everybody Draw Mohammed Day!' Do your part to both water down the pool of targets and, oh yeah, defend a little something our country is famous for (but maybe not for long? Comedy Central cooperated with terrorists and pulled the episode) the first amendment.

— Molly Norris (April 20, 2010), Molly.Norris.com

The poster included a claim of sponsorship by an organization named "Citizens Against Citizens Against Humor or CACAH (pronounced ca-ca)", which Norris later said was purely fictional. Norris dedicated the cartoon to the creators of South Park, Matt Stone and Trey Parker.

In late April, after she had rejected the idea for the May 20 protest, Norris stated on her website: "This was always a drawing about rights, never MEANT to disrespect religion. Alas – if we don't have rights, we will not be able to practice the religion of our choice. [...] None of these little characters ARE the likeness of Mohammed, they are just CLAIMING to be!" She also wrote, "I, the cartoonist, NEVER launched a draw Mohammed day. It is, in this FICTIONAL poster sponsored by this FICTIONAL GROUP", referring to the "Citizens Against Citizens Against Humor" wording in the cartoon. "SATIRE about a CURRENT EVENT, people!!! (That's what cartoonist's [sic] do!)"

=== Early publicity ===
Norris circulated the cartoon to bloggers based in Seattle, Washington. She sent a copy of her illustration to Dan Savage, who posted it on his blog on April 22. On April 23, she was interviewed by Dave Ross of KIRO, a Seattle radio station. Norris responded to a question, "Are you sure you want to do this?", and said "Yeah, I want to water down the targets ... as a cartoonist, I just felt so much passion about what had happened, I wanted to counter Comedy Central's message about feeling afraid." The motivation for the protest was not simply to defend the South Park creators, but also to support the right to free speech under the First Amendment to the United States Constitution. She also said, "it's a cartoonist's job to be non-PC". On her website, Norris stated that the idea was not to disrespect Islam, but to support everybody's freedom of expression.

An "Everybody Draw Mohammed Day" Facebook page was created by Jon Wellington. By the morning of April 26, the page had almost 6,000 confirmed guests. By April 25, someone (whose identity is unknown) had started a "Ban Everybody Draw Muhammad Day" counter-protest page on Facebook, which had 800 confirmed guests. Bloggers at The Atlantic, Reason, National Review Online and Glenn Reynolds in his "Instapundit" blog, all posted comments and links about the proposed day, giving it wide publicity. Blogs at The Washington Post and Los Angeles Times websites also posted news about the idea. Newser categorized the protest movement among, "online movements against tyranny". A blog was created for the fictional group "Citizens Against Citizens Against Humor", at www.cacah.org.

By April 27, over 9,000 guests confirmed that they planned to participate in the event. A story about the protest movement was one of the most popular articles highlighted on the website Digg.com. On April 28, The Malaysian Insider reported that the protest movement "appears to be gaining ground", and some schools planned to join in the event. Michael C. Moynihan of Reason stated he planned to select some of his favorite depictions of Muhammad from the protest movement, and then add them to the Reason.com website. By May 3, 2010, 11,000 members of the protest movement were on Facebook, and individuals had submitted over 460 pictures.

=== Cartoonist and Facebook page creator end involvement ===
On April 25, Norris wrote on her website that the response to her idea had surprised and shocked her: "I did not intend for my cartoon to go viral. I did not intend to be the focus of any 'group'. I practice the First Amendment by drawing what I wish. This particular cartoon of a 'poster' seems to have struck a gigantic nerve, something I was totally unprepared for. I am going back to the drawing table now!" On April 26, she wrote on her website: "I am NOT involved in "Everybody Draw Mohammd [sic ] Day! I made a cartoon that went viral and I am not going with it. Many other folks have used my cartoon to start sites, etc. Please go to them as I am a private person who draws stuff". She also asked Savage to replace the original illustration she had given him with another one she drew that was tamer, but Savage refused. Asked why she initially publicized it, she replied, "Because I'm an idiot."

Norris said the campaign had grown much bigger than she initially intended, and that her cartoon was being used in ways she could not control. "I just want to go back to my quiet life", she told the writer of a blog about comics at The Washington Post. Wellington announced on April 26 that he, too, was dropping out of the movement. "I am aghast that so many people are posting deeply offensive pictures of the Prophet," he wrote. "Y'all go ahead if that's your bag, but count me out." Norris acknowledged, "I said that I wanted to counter fear and then I got afraid." On April 29, Norris suggested that "Everybody Draw Mohammed Day" be called off: "Let's call off 'Everybody Draw Mohammed Day' by changing it to 'Everybody Draw Al Gore Day' instead. Enough Mohammed drawings have already been made to get the point across. At this juncture, such drawings are only hurtful to more liberal and moderate Muslims who have not done anything to endanger our first amendment rights." On May 1, Norris posted a marked up version of her original cartoon, apologizing to Muslims.

Norris' change in position received varying reactions from commentators. Kathleen Parker, an opinion columnist for The Washington Post, wrote, "Norris's cartoon was a fine idea, but she should be relieved of further duty or responsibility." Writing for The Daily Telegraph, Alex Spillius commented, "No one should blame Norris for withdrawing from the fray, for this kind of case throws up lingering and insidious uncertainties. Any threat could blow over quickly or endure, Rushdie-style, for decades. The row over the cartoons depicting Mohammed in the Danish paper Jyllands-Posten percolated for months before bubbling over into violent protests." William Wei of The Business Insider was more critical of the decision by the cartoonist to withdraw from the protest movement, with an article titled, "Artist Who Proposed 'Everybody Draw Mohammed Day!' To Protest South Park Censorship Wimps Out."

=== Protest movement continued ===
An information technology specialist named Mimi, based in Toronto, Canada, helped to lead the protest movement in the wake of the departures of Norris and Wellington. Mimi stated to AOL News that the protest movement should be regarded as, "pro-free speech, not anti-Muslim." She commented, "If [Muslims] are offended, they have the right to be offended – just like Christians." With regard to keeping with the tenets of freedom of speech, Mimi is permitting a wide array of depictions of Muhammad "except for those inciting violence or pornographic in nature." "Mainstream society does whatever the Muslim society asks out of fear of violence or political correctness. But if you want to live in a Western society and use the system to protect your rights, you have to be willing to allow others to have theirs as well," said Mimi.

According to Paste Magazine, by April 30, 2010, "Norris' small protest [had] grown to encompass 32 Facebook events with a combined total of over 11,000 people planning to participate." Ron Nurwisah of National Post noted, "Norris' backtracking might be a bit late as the event seems to have taken a life of its own," and Fox 9 also pointed out, "she may have started something she can't stop. Others have taken up the cause of 'Everybody Draw Muhammed Day'." Tim Edwards of The First Post pointed out, "It seems that nothing can now stop May 20, 2010 becoming the inaugural 'Everybody Draw Mohammed Day'. Even if, in an ironic twist, its biggest backers have now been scared off."

Writing for ComicsAlliance, Laura Hudson noted that the website supported the protest movement and would participate in the event on May 20, 2010: "There is power in numbers, and if you're an artist, creator, cartoonist, or basically anyone who would like to exercise your right to free speech in a way that it is actively threatened, that would be the day to do it. ... if you're an artist, cartoonist, or creator who plans to participate, drop us a line and let us know—we'll be adding our own terribly drawn rendition of the prophet here on ComicsAlliance when the day rolls around and we'd love it if you joined us." In a May 3, 2010 piece for The Washington Post blog, the founder and president of the Secular Coalition for America, Herb Silverman, wrote in support of the protest movement. Silverman stated he agreed with the rationale behind the idea, commenting, "Whether this succeeds or not, and I have no personal interest in drawing Muhammad, I support the concept. We must join together to stop injustice."

A columnist for The Washington Post Writers Group wrote that Norris should not be regarded as having further responsibility related to the movement, and affirmed that her Muhammad cartoon had significantly impacted a greater discussion about the issue. Telepolis described some of the pictures submitted to the Facebook group in support of the protest movement as, "funny, crude, silly, original, the whole range of possibilities." The Jawa Report urged individuals to participate in the protest movement, but encouraged them to post images reflecting positively on Muhammad. Writing in an editorial for The Washington Times, Jason Greaves urged individuals to participate in the protest event on May 20. Greaves concluded, "Theo van Gogh was murdered for making a movie critical of Islam. 'South Park' creators Trey Parker and Matt Stone are threatened with the same fate. They deserve our solidarity, and I will stand with them by hosting images of Muhammad on my own website. Please stand with us."

In a May 17, 2010, article in The Daily Bruin, writer Tyler Dosaj noted that numbers of both supporters and critics of the protest movement were increasing: "The Facebook group is 35,000 strong. To compare, the anti-Draw Mohammed Day group is almost 30,000 strong. Both are gaining members rapidly." In a May 18, 2010 article, "Why We're Having an Everybody Draw Mohammed Contest on Thursday May 20", Reason editor Nick Gillespie explained: "No one has a right to an audience or even to a sympathetic hearing, much less an engaged audience. But no one should be beaten or killed or imprisoned simply for speaking their mind or praying to one god as opposed to the other or none at all or getting on with the small business of living their life in peaceful fashion. If we cannot or will not defend that principle with a full throat, then we deserve to choke on whatever jihadists of all stripes can force down our throats." Gillespie asserted, "Our Draw Mohammed contest is not a frivolous exercise of hip, ironic, hoolarious sacrilege toward a minority religion in the United States (though even that deserves all the protection that the most serioso political commentary commands). It's a defense of what is at the core of a society that is painfully incompetent at delivering on its promise of freedom, tolerance, and equal rights." As May 20, 2010, came closer, Molly Norris stated she was staying away from being directly involved in the protest movement. Norris told Dave Ross, "I'm against my own concept becoming a reality.... If I had wanted to be taken seriously, I would be thrilled, but now I'm horrified because people did take it as an actual day. The one-off cartoon is not good as a long term plan because it's offensive." Fox News Channel reported that on May 19, 2010, a Facebook group supporting the protest movement had 41,000 members, and The Register reported this increased to 43,000 the same day. Norris told Fox News Channel in a statement on May 19, "It's turned into something completely different, nothing I could've imagined it morphing into. I'm happy some people are talking, because obviously this needs to be addressed." By May 20, the Toronto Sun reported that both the "Everybody Draw Mohammed Day" group and the "Against 'Everybody Draw Mohammed Day'" Facebook group protesting against the initiative had attracted more than 100,000 supporters, at 101,870 members and 106,000 members respectively.

On May 20, 2010, Nick Gillespie and Matt Welch of Reason announced the winners of the publication's "Everybody Draw Mohammed Day" contest. Gillespie and Welch warned the reader not to view the image "if you are offended by graphical representations of the Prophet Mohammed." Of the images highlighted, Gillespie and Welch explained: "The single most important element–and the thing that ties these selections together–is that each image forces the viewer to do two things. First, they consciously call into question the nature of representation, no small matter in fights over whether it is allowed under Islamic law to depict Mohammed ... Second, each of the images forces the viewer to actively participate not simply in the creation of meaning but of actually constructing the image itself." There were two images in the position of runner-up – one was an artistic rendition of a tobacco smoking pipe. The depiction references surrealist artist René Magritte, and includes the text, "This is not a pipe. This is Muhammed." The Reason journalists commented that the image toyed with Magritte's "famous statement about the necessary disjuncture between a picture and the thing it seeks to represent." The second runner-up was a parody of the Where's Waldo? series, and the winner was a connect the dots picture. Commenting on the winner of the Reason contest, Gillespie and Welch concluded, "There is a deeper lesson here: Connect the dots and discover that we all must be Spartacus on Everybody Draw Mohammad Day. And that in a free society, every day is Everybody Draw Mohammed Day."

=== Pakistan Internet block ===
Subsequent to an order from the Lahore High Court on May 19, 2010, the government of Pakistan, through its agency the Pakistan Telecommunication Authority (PTA), indefinitely banned Facebook in the country, in response to the impending May 20 date at the focus of the protest movement. The order to carry out the shut down of Facebook in Pakistan was given by the Pakistan Telecommunication Authority, which also publicized an email address and phone number and requested individuals contact the agency to let them know about "all similar URLs where such objectionable material is found". Representative Khoram Ali Mehran of the Pakistan agency stated to CNN, "Obviously it (the blocking of Facebook) is related to the objectionable material that was placed on Facebook. That is why it is blocked. We have blocked it for an indefinite amount of time. We are just following the government's instructions and the ruling of the Lahore High Court. If the government decides to unblock it then that's what we will do." The agency was responding to an action by a group of Islamic attorneys based in Pakistan, who had acted to get the court order due to a Facebook group "Everybody Draw Mohammad Day—May 20". Azhar Siddique had filed the petition to the Lahore High Court on behalf of the organization, the Islamic Lawyers Forum. The government faced pressure from public protests against Facebook. In its petition to the government, the Islamic Lawyers Forum described the "Everybody Draw Mohammed Day" event as "blasphemous". Siddique told The Times, "The court has also ordered the foreign ministry to investigate why such a competition is being held." The lawyers succeeded in getting the government to block the Facebook group itself individually on May 18, but the Islamic lawyers requested a full block of the entirety of the Facebook site, because the organization had permitted the posting of the particular group on its site. They argued that unless the entire Facebook website were blocked, it would be difficult to stop the protest movement campaign on the site. The Lahore court carried out this request, and ordered the government to issue a temporary block on Facebook to stand until May 31, 2010. Justice Ejaz Chaudhry of the Lahore High Court issued the ruling of the court. The force of the ban was effective immediately after the ruling of the court. Those present for the court's ruling included many religious clerics, attorneys, and students. The court held an in-depth hearing on the matter on May 31, 2010.

The deputy attorney general of Punjab province, Naveed Inayat Malik, confirmed to the Press Association that the Lahore court had ordered Facebook banned in the country until May 31, 2010. The Secretary of the Pakistan Ministry of Information Technology, Naguib Malik, told the Associated Press that he requested the Pakistan Telecommunications Authority to carry out the ruling of the Lahore court. Pakistan Law Minister Babar Awan told ABC News, "this issue will be raised on all international forums." According to Press Trust of India, by mid-day on May 19, 2010, individuals in Pakistan were not able to gain access to the Facebook site via computer, but could get entry using a smartphone. The Hindu reported that prior to the court's ruling, multiple Internet service providers had taken independent action to block Facebook, in light of protests against the website in Pakistan.

The May 20 plans of the protest movement sparked demonstrations in the streets of Pakistan and objections to Facebook by groups including the Pakistan-based Muslim Lawyers Movement. In several Pakistani cities demonstrators burned the Norwegian flag although the Norwegian News Agency reported that the Norwegian flag was burned mistakenly in the belief that it was the Danish. In Lahore both Swedish and Danish flags were burned, A lawyer involved in the action in the Lahore court, Rai Bashir, told The Daily Telegraph, "There are so many insults to the Prophet on the Internet and that's why we felt we had to bring this case. All Muslims in Pakistan and the world will be supporting us." Bashir explained to Sky News, "We moved the petition in the wake of widespread resentment in the Muslim community against the Facebook contest." Islamic Lawyers Forum attorney, Chaudhry Zulfikar Ali, told Xinhua News Agency, "The competition has hurt the sentiments of the Muslims." Protesters against Facebook and "Everybody Draw Mohammed Day" converged in Karachi on May 19, 2010, and held up signs and yelled phrases critical of Facebook. According to the Associated Press, approximately 2,000 female students protested in Karachi, urging the banning of Facebook for permitting the "Everybody Draw Mohammed Day" movement on the site. Agence France-Presse compared this to the 2006 protests over the depictions of Muhammed in European newspapers. They went on to report that there were approximately 20 individuals demonstrating outside the court in Lahore after its decision, holding signs which were negative regarding Facebook. Picketers outside the court held up signs praiseworthy of Muhammad. One protest sign at a picket in Lahore read: "We love Muhammad. Say No to Facebook." BBC News noted reports in Pakistan media that there were protests against Facebook on May 19, 2010 outside parliament in Islamabad. Individuals passed on text messages, requesting other Facebook users to support the ban on the website. Attorneys standing outside the Lahore court on May 19, 2010 were repeating the phrase, "Down with Facebook". Protests against Facebook were organized in Lahore, Kasur, Narowal, Gujranwala, Rawalpindi and Peshawar; by Pakistan-based religious parties including Jamaat-e-Islami, Islami Jamiat Tulba and Jamiat Ulema-e-Islam. According to The Financial Express, "protests against the website were held across the country". The Vancouver Sun reported that Hamid Saeed Kazmi, Pakistan Religious Affairs Minister, "strongly condemned" the Facebook groups' efforts and requested Prime Minister Yousuf Raza Gilani "to take immediate action and call a Muslim conference".

The Facebook group had supporters including Dutch politician Geert Wilders, former Dutch politician and feminist activist Ayaan Hirsi Ali. An Islamic student association based in Lahore, Pakistan, handed out pamphlets requesting individuals to boycott Facebook; the pamphlet stated: "The west is conspiring against the honour of the prophet and of Muslims. The real purpose of freedom of speech is to provoke the sentiments of Muslims." A representative of the Karachi-based Internet company Creative Chaos named Shakir Husain told The Guardian that a ban of Facebook would not be easy to carry out due to the ability to circumvent it using tactics such as proxy servers. Husain noted, "By banning this web page, it will just make people more curious. It's pouring petrol on a small fire that could become a lot bigger. You can't police the Internet. The Saudis have tried it, as have other governments, and all have failed. It's a waste of state money."

The CEO of the company Nayatel, Wahaj-us-Siraj, told Reuters that the decision of the Lahore court was not wise: "Blocking the entire website would anger users, especially young adults, because the social networking website is so popular among them and they spend most of their time on it. Basically, our judges aren't technically sound. They have just ordered it, but it should have been done in a better way by just blocking a particular URL or link." The Gabriel Consulting Group analyst Dan Olds commented about the Pakistan government's ban to Computerworld, "I think we can expect to see more of this type of thing coming from dictatorial countries as they try to keep their citizenry locked down." Olds observed, "Trying to stop citizens from accessing the Internet is increasingly becoming like a little kid trying to stop the tide with a toy shovel and a bucket." An editorial in the Pakistan-based newspaper the Express Tribune commented on the ban of Facebook, "Many users of the social media website have put up their own pages expressing their admiration for the Holy Prophet — surely this is a better response. Furthermore, the said page is one of millions on Facebook and blocking it entirely means that millions of users in Pakistan will be unable to access a site which has become part of their daily life. A better way would be to block the offensive web page but allow users in this country access to the rest of Facebook."

A representative of Facebook told CBS News that the block of the website in Pakistan was under investigation by the company. The company released a statement on May 19, 2010: "While the content does not violate our terms, we do understand it may not be legal in some countries. We are investigating this. In cases like this, the approach is sometimes to restrict certain content from being shown in specific countries." The Jakarta Globe reported that several Muslim religious scholars in Indonesia were critical of Facebook in light of the protest movement. Rohadi Abdul Fatah the Indonesia, Religious Affairs Ministry director of Islam and Shariah Law, announced that Facebook was to be considered haram (forbidden) according to Muslim law. Rohadi Abdul Fatah stated, "We cannot tolerate it. Those who created the account were extremely irresponsible." Indonesia Communication and Information Minister Tifatul Sembiring stated to The Jakarta Globe, "I consider this an act of provocation to mess up religious harmony enjoyed by Indonesians. I call on everybody to stay calm. Let us all just cool down." Sembiring stated his intention to write the management of Facebook, and noted, "Removing it is useless because other party can just post it again on the account. Therefore, we all need to be aware of this."

On May 20, 2010, the Internet ban by the government of Pakistan related to "Everybody Draw Mohammed Day" was extended to include the video-sharing website, YouTube. YouTube released a statement, saying it is "looking into the matter and working to ensure that the service is restored as soon as possible". The Pakistan Telecommunications Authority stated it ordered the shut down of YouTube in the country due to "blasphemous content". A representative of YouTube told BBC News, "YouTube offers citizens the world over a vital window on cultures and societies and we believe people should not be denied access to information via video. Because YouTube is a platform for free expression of all sorts, we take great care when we enforce our policies. Content that violates our guidelines is removed as soon as we become aware of it." Additional websites including Flickr were blocked in Pakistan on May 20. The Pakistan Telecommunications Authority had first tried to block separate pages on YouTube; representatives of the agency stated to Reuters, "but the blasphemous content kept appearing so we ordered a total shut down".

Pakistan restricted access to Wikipedia and banned viewing of certain pages on the website in the country on May 20, 2010, according to Fast Company, The New York Times, Radio France Internationale, The Express Tribune, The Washington Post, Computerworld, Newsweek, Agence France-Presse, and the Financial Times. Agence France-Presse noted, "The Pakistan Telecommunications Authority (PTA) extended a ban on Facebook, ordered by a court until May 31, to popular video sharing website YouTube and restricted Wikipedia." The Washington Post reported, "At least 450 sites, including Wikipedia, were also cut off by midday" on May 20. Radio France Internationale quoted the editor of The Friday Times, who stated, "They've banned not just Facebook, now you have YouTube. They're also blocking Flickr, I've just heard that they've blocked Wikipedia ... eager beavers sitting in the PTA and in other ministries are just going on and blocking sites." The New York Times reported that the ban, "also included certain pages on Flickr and Wikipedia". According to Radio France Internationale, and Newsweek, pages were blocked on Wikipedia by the Pakistan agency due to what the government described as "growing sacrilegious contents". Ahmad Rafay Alam of the Pakistani English-language daily newspaper The Express Tribune commented, "the Pakistan Telecommunication Authority has taken it upon itself to block Wikipedia, among other things." The Christian Science Monitor reported, "Pakistan blocked YouTube, Wikipedia, and other websites ... to try to suppress a Facebook page declaring Thursday Everybody Draw Mohammad Day." Reuters reported on May 20 that "websites, including Wikipedia and Flickr, have been inaccessible in Pakistan" since the previous evening. According to Agence France-Presse, a representative of the organization the Internet Service Providers Association of Pakistan, Wahaj us Siraj, stated "Wikipedia had been blocked" in the country.

A representative of the United States Department of State weighed in on the actions of the Pakistan government with respect to the images. Assistant Secretary of State Philip J. Crowley stated that the United States was critical of a "deliberate attempt to offend Muslims". Crowley commented, "Pakistan is wrestling to this issue. We respect any actions that need to be taken under Pakistani law to protect their citizens from offensive speech." The Assistant Secretary of State went on to note, "At the same time, Pakistan has to make sure that in taking any particular action, that you're not restricting speech to the millions and millions of people who are connected to the Internet and have a universal right to the free flow of information." On May 22, 2010, the Ambassador to the United States from Pakistan, Hussain Haqqani, formally issued a complaint to the U.S., in communications with U.S. Special Representative Richard Holbrooke. The Pakistan embassy in the United States sent a formal complaint to the U.S. Department of State. The Lahore High Court had ordered the Pakistan representative to issue the complaint to the U.S. regarding the images on Facebook. Pakistan's embassy in the U.S. told the U.S. Department of State that the images on Facebook "immensely hurt and discomforted the people and the government of Pakistan"; the embassy requested the U.S. government "take effective measures to prevent, stop or block this blasphemous contest immediately". On May 25, 2010, The Nation reported that a poll of citizens of Pakistan conducted by ProPakistani.pk revealed that 70 percent of those polled wanted Facebook to be permanently banned in the country.

On May 31, 2010, PC World reported that the Lahore High Court had lifted the ban on Facebook. The magazine quoted the government of Pakistan as saying that "the web site had promised to make material considered derogatory inaccessible to users in Pakistan." This was in line with an earlier statement by a Facebook spokeswoman, stating that Facebook "may consider IP blocking in Pakistan upon further review of local regulations, standards and customs". Pakistan's secretary of IT and telecom said in an interview that Facebook had "apologized" and agreed to block access to the page from Pakistan. Facebook had already blocked access to the page for users from India the previous week, at the request of the Indian authorities. On May 30, 2010, the day before the Facebook ban in Pakistan was lifted, Bangladesh imposed its own ban on Facebook.

Justice Ijaz Chaudhry of the Lahore High Court planned to review the case on June 15, 2010 to see if Facebook had allowed more blasphemous material to be displayed. This review was postponed to July 9, 2010.

==== MillatFacebook ====
Millat of Millat Ibrahim (faith of Abraham) is a word used to describe the Muslim faith. Due to the block on Facebook in Pakistan, a spinoff version of the site, MillatFacebook, was created to cater primarily to Muslims. This is Pakistan's first social networking site and a writer for Agence France Presse reported in May 2010 that it had received poor reviews and drawn few adherents.

== Reception ==
=== Support ===
The idea for the May 20 protest received support from Kathleen Parker, an opinion columnist for The Washington Post: "Americans love their free speech and have had enough of those who think they can dictate the limits of that fundamental right. [...] Draw to any heart's discontent. It's a free country. For now." The idea also received support from prominent bloggers and bloggers on prominent websites, such as Michael C. Moynihan at Reason magazine's "Hit & Run" blog, who encouraged his readers to send him their drawings. Moynihan stated he planned to select some of his favorite depictions of Muhammad from the protest movement, and then add them to the Reason.com website. Moynihan commented, "In the South Park episode that started all this, Buddha does lines of coke and there was an episode where Cartman started a Christian rock band that sang very homo-erotic songs. Yet there is one religious figure we can't make fun of. The point of the episode that started the controversy is that celebrities wanted Muhammad's power not to be ridiculed. How come non-Muslims aren't allowed to make jokes?" Moynihan posited that the decision of Comedy Central to enact self-censorship of the South Park episode would have the impact of worsening the situation.

Maayana Miskin of Arutz Sheva characterized the movement as "a mass protest". Westword commented positively on the protest idea, "Sounds like an idea we'd like to frame." The editor of Family Security Matters, Pam Meister, discussed the protest movement from the perspective of freedom of speech, and commented, "I realize that in a free society, someone is always going to be doing or saying something that will offend somebody somewhere. I also realize that more free speech, not censorship, is the answer." Andrew Mellon of Big Journalism wrote in favor of the protest movement, commenting, "The bottom line is that the First Amendment guarantees free speech including criticism of all peoples. We are an equal-opportunity offense country. To censor ourselves to avoid upsetting a certain group (in a cartoon no less) is un-American." Mario Roy of La Presse discussed the incident, and noted, "it is likely that institutions will apply more and more self-censorship. Fearing a possible threat, nothing is worse than the fear of fear."

Writing for The American Spectator, Jeremy Lott commented positively about the protest movement: "While the suits at Comedy Central and Yale University Press have been cowed, people across the country have decided to speak up and thereby magnify the offense a thousandfold." Helge Rønning, a professor at the Institute of Media and Communication at the University of Oslo, said the offense to Muslims was outweighed by freedom-of-speech concerns. "Indignation from those who claim the right to engage in criticism of religion is as important as the indignation that comes from the Muslim side," he told the NRK (Norwegian Broadcasting Corporation). "I think that this is an attitude that goes deeper than whether these drawings are blasphemous or not." Vebjørn Selbekk, a Norwegian editor who was threatened in 2006 after he reprinted Danish cartoons of Mohammed in his publication, supported the May 20 protest. "I think maybe this is the right way to react—with humor, and also to spread this number, so it isn't only a few who sit with all the threats and all the discomfort associated with defending our freedom of speech in this area," he said.

=== Criticism ===
Law professor and blogger Ann Althouse rejected the Everybody Draw Mohammed Day idea because "depictions of Muhammad offend millions of Muslims who are no part of the violent threats." James Taranto, writing in the "Best of the Web Today" column at The Wall Street Journal, also objected to the idea, not only because depicting Mohammed "is inconsiderate of the sensibilities of others", but also because "it defines those others—Muslims—as being outside of our culture, unworthy of the courtesy we readily accord to insiders." Bill Walsh of Bedford Minuteman wrote critically of the initiative, which seemed "petulant and childish" to him: "It attempts to battle religious zealotry with rudeness and sacrilege, and we can only wait to see what happens, but I fear it won't be good." Janet Albrechtsen wrote in The Australian, "As a cartoon, it was mildly amusing. As a campaign, it's crass and gratuitously offensive." Writing for New York University's Center for Religion and Media publication, The Revealer, Jeremy F. Walton called the event a "blasphemous faux holiday", which would "only serve to reinforce broader American misunderstandings of Islam and Muslims".

Franz Kruger, writing for the Mail & Guardian, called Everybody Draw Mohammed Day a "silly Facebook initiative" and found "the undertone of a 'clash of civilisations'" in it "disturbing", noting that "it is clear that some feel great satisfaction at what they see as 'sticking it to the Muslims'." The Mail & Guardian, which had itself published a controversial cartoon of Mohammed in its pages, distanced itself from the group, noting that it "claimed to be a protest against restrictions on freedom of speech and religious fanaticism, but had seemingly become a forum for venting Islamophobic sentiment." Hugo Rifkind, writing for The Times, called the Facebook initiative a "grubby project": "... there's something here that makes me twitch. I think it's the 'everybody'. It's the 'everybody' of a man at the back of a mob, trying to persuade other people to get lynching. If a cartoonist wants to satirise Islam by drawing Mohammed, I'm on his side all the way. But among the 13,000 pictures on the EDMD Facebook page, you have Mohammed as a dog in a veil, Mohammed as a pig and Mohammed as a monkey. That's not resistance, but picking a fight. Issuing a death threat against somebody who drew a picture isn't my thing, but this isn't either." Bilal Baloch, writing for The Guardian, called the initiative "juvenile" and "an irresponsible poke-in-the-eye", while at the same time criticizing the Pakistani government's response, and calling on "Pakistan's Internet community to engage in an organised and compelling dialogue: if not with the offenders, then most certainly with the rest of the world that is watching."

In Pakistan, an editorial in Dawn, the country's oldest English-language newspaper, said that there was no doubt that the Facebook initiative "was in poor taste and deserving of strong condemnation," adding that it was "debatable whether freedom of expression should extend to material that is offensive to the sensibilities, traditions and beliefs of religious, ethnic or other communities." However, the editorial called the Lahore High Court's decision to block Facebook a "knee-jerk reaction," saying that, "many users feel, and rightly so, that they can decide for themselves what is or is not offensive, and choose not to access material that is repugnant to their beliefs," and that the block might "have played right into the hands of those who think nothing of displaying or publishing material that denigrates their beliefs. By reacting the way we do we only harm ourselves and, in the process, even become a subject of derision."

=== Analysis ===
The protest movement and incidents surrounding the censorship of the South Park episode were discussed on the National Public Radio program, Talk of the Nation, where commentators including Ross Douthat analyzed the phenomenon of Norris withdrawing from the cartoon. Stephanie Gutmann of The Daily Telegraph wrote that she had joined the Facebook group, and commented that if the 2010 Times Square car bomb attempt was found to be related to the South Park episode "200", "this sort of protest will be more important than ever." Writing for The Faster Times, journalist Noah Lederman noted that Norris' cartoon, "was her way of supporting the show's creators and the First Amendment." Writing for Financial Times, John Lloyd commented on the decision by Norris to withdraw from the protest movement and noted, "Molly Norris proposed a 'let's everyone draw Mohammed day' – then, apparently appalled by her own audacity, backed quickly away."

Writing for Religion Dispatches, Austin Dacey compared the protest movement to Martin Luther, stating, "Forget the South Park dust up; forget Everybody Draw Muhammad Day. If you want to see truly shocking anti-religious cartoons, you have to go back to the sixteenth century. Near the end of Luther's life, his propaganda campaign against Rome grew increasingly vitriolic and his language grotesquely pungent." Dacey argued, "The debate over cartoon depictions of the Prophet Muhammad is often framed as a clash between free speech and religious attitudes. But it is just as much a clash between conflicting religious attitudes, and the freedom at stake is not only freedom of expression but freedom of religion. For while Luther was surely engaging in offensive speech, he was also exercising a right of freedom of conscience, which included the right to dissent from Catholic orthodoxy."

In an analysis of the protest movement for the Daily Bruin, journalist Jordan Manalastas commented, "Everybody Draw Mohammed Day is a chance to reinstate offense and sincerity to their proper place, freed from terror or silence. ... The proper (and, at the risk of looking jingoistic, American) way to combat bad speech is with better speech. To silence and be silenced are the refuge of cowards." In an analysis of the protest movement for Spiked, Brendan O'Neill was critical of the concept of "mocking Muhammad," writing, "... these two camps – the Muhammad-knockers and the Muslim offence-takers – are locked in a deadly embrace. Islamic extremists need Western depictions of Muhammad as evidence that there is a new crusade against Islam, while the Muhammad-knockers need the flag-burning, street-stomping antics of the extremists as evidence that their defence of the Enlightenment is a risky, important business."

Several editorial cartoonists quoted by The Washington Post blogger Michael Cavna were critical of the Draw Mohammed Day idea or declined to participate, although all supported the right of cartoonists to depict Mohammed if they chose to. The president of the Association of American Editorial Cartoonists opposed involvement because, "something like that can be too easily co-opted by interest groups who, I suspect, have an agenda that goes beyond a simple defense of free expression." Other cartoonists quoted in the article called the event, "childish and needlessly provocative," or demurred because they dislike, "choreographed punditry."

Tarek Kahlaoui, an assistant professor of Islamic Art at Rutgers University, analyzed the reasons behind Islamic aniconism in an article on Global Expert Finder, pointing out that despite aniconism the depiction of Muhammad is not wholly forbidden in Islam, and so in principle it should be possible for non-Muslims to draw him as well, although stating, "What should be an issue, however, are all possible implications between visual representation and bigotry." He also defended the First Amendment of the U.S. Constitution in the way that it's an important right of all Americans.

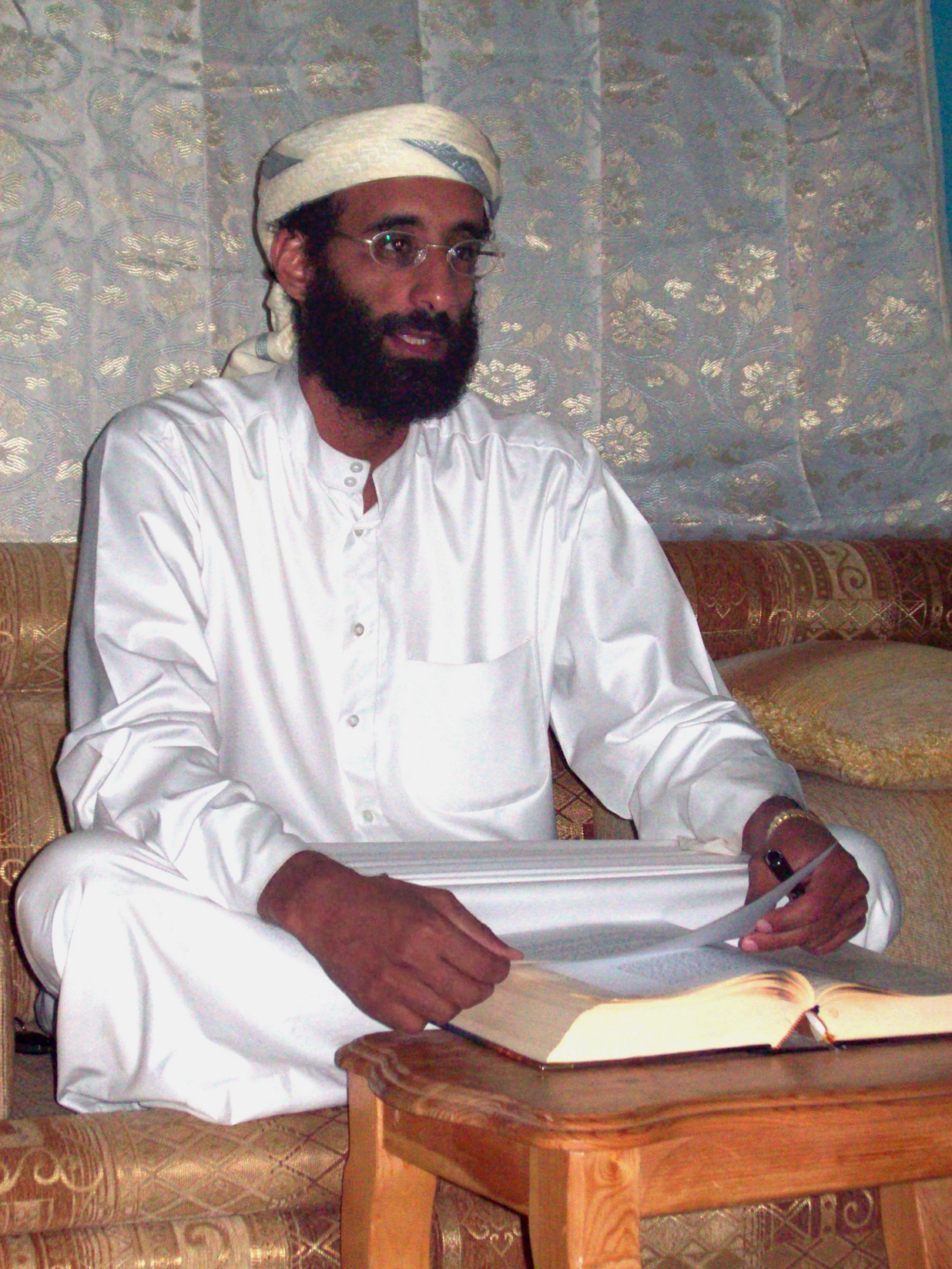
Anwar al-Awlaki

== Threat on Molly Norris's life, forced into hiding ==
On July 11, 2010, it was reported that the Yemeni-American al-Qaeda cleric Anwar al-Awlaki had put Molly Norris on a hitlist. In the English version of the al-Qaeda magazine Inspire, Al-Awlaki wrote, "The medicine prescribed by the Messenger of Allah is the execution of those involved," and was quoted as saying,

The large number of participants makes it easier for us because there are more targets to choose from in addition to the difficulty of the government offering all of them special protection ... But even then our campaign should not be limited to only those who are active participants.

FBI officials reportedly notified Norris warning her that they considered it a "very serious threat."

Norris has since changed her name and gone into hiding. According to the Seattle Weekly (her former employer), this decision was based on "the insistence of top security specialists at the FBI."

The threat against Norris appeared to be renewed when Al Qaeda's Inspire included her in its March 2013 edition with eleven others in a pictorial spread entitled "Wanted: Dead or Alive for Crimes Against Islam," and captioned, "Yes We Can: A Bullet A Day Keeps the Infidel Away." The cartoonist Stéphane "Charb" Charbonnier was also added to Al-Qaeda's most wanted list, along with Lars Vilks and three Jyllands-Posten staff members: Kurt Westergaard, Carsten Juste, and Flemming Rose.

As of 2015, Norris is still in hiding and jihadist threats against her life continue.

== Gallery ==
Images and media related to "Everybody Draw Mohammed Day"

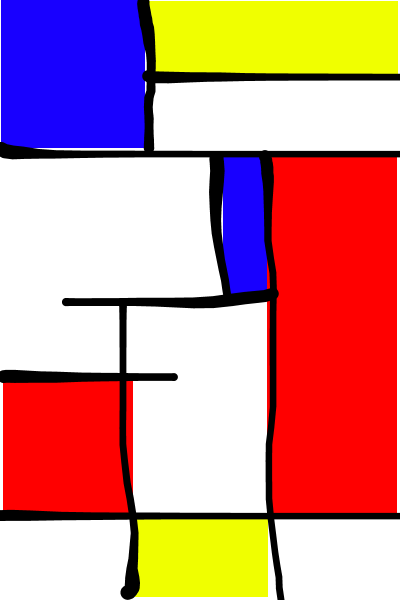
"Mohammed (in the style of Mondrian)"

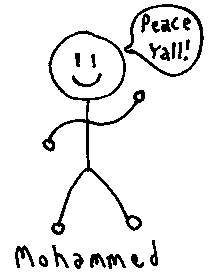
Stick figure image cartoon, advocating for peace

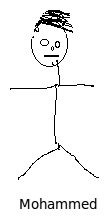
Depiction in stick figure format, by individual from New Port Richey, Florida

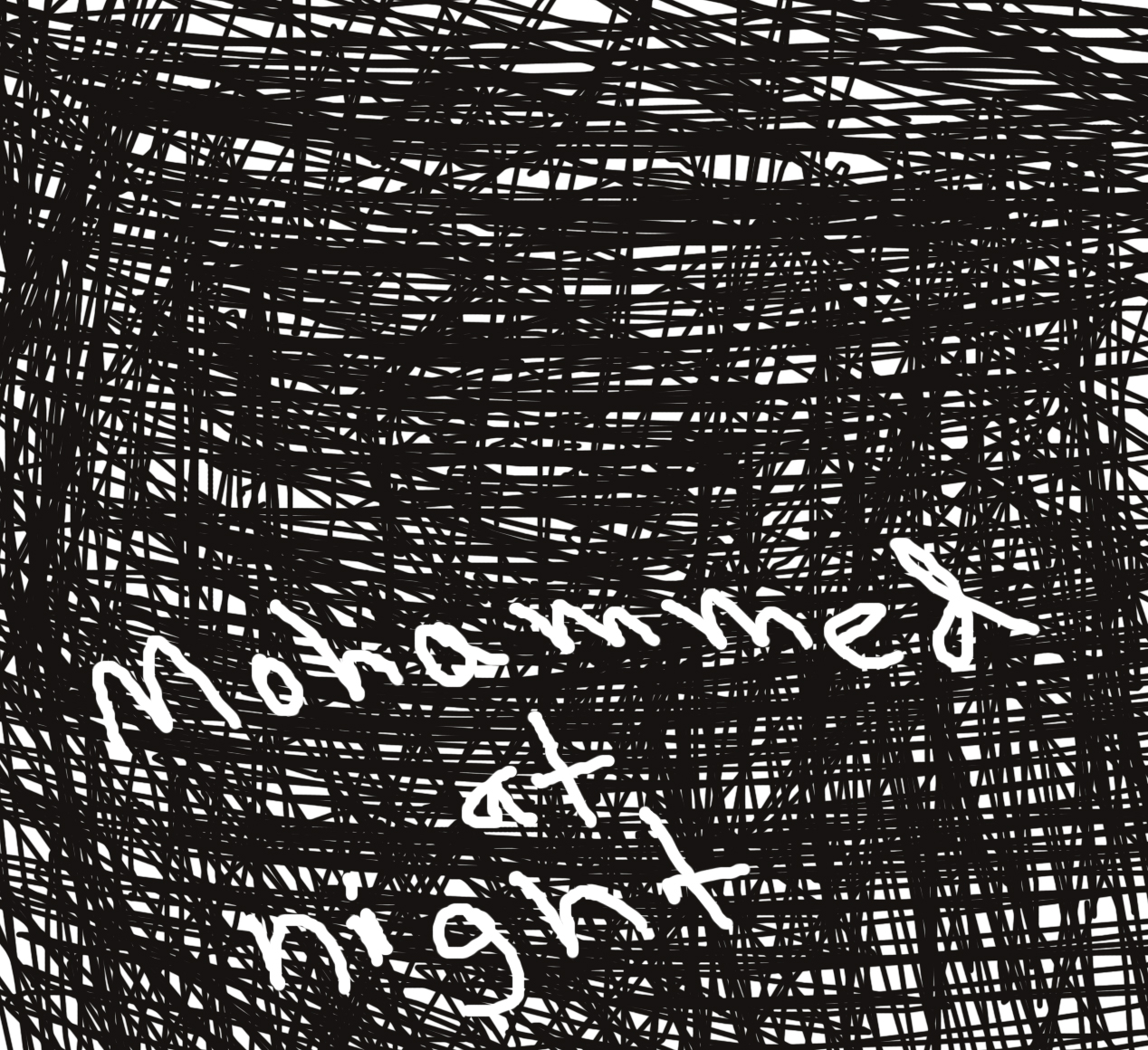
"Mohammed at night" – black background with no depiction of a character, simply text at the bottom

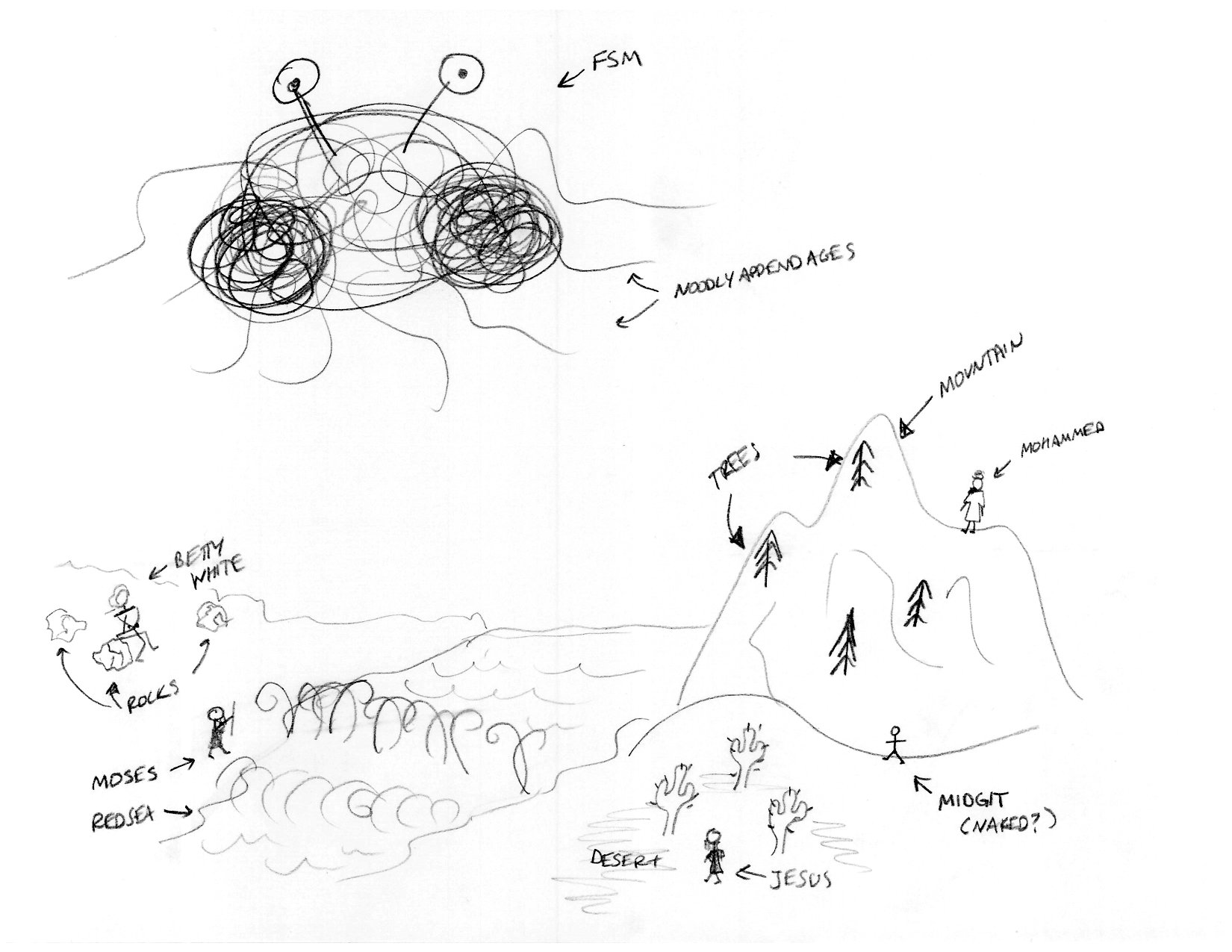
Depiction, including Jesus and the Flying Spaghetti Monster

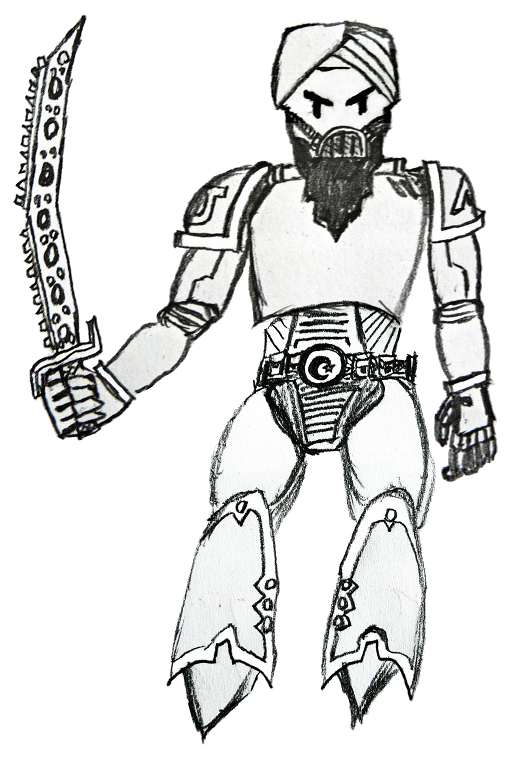
Depiction, in style of the Ultramarines from Space Marines of Warhammer 40,000

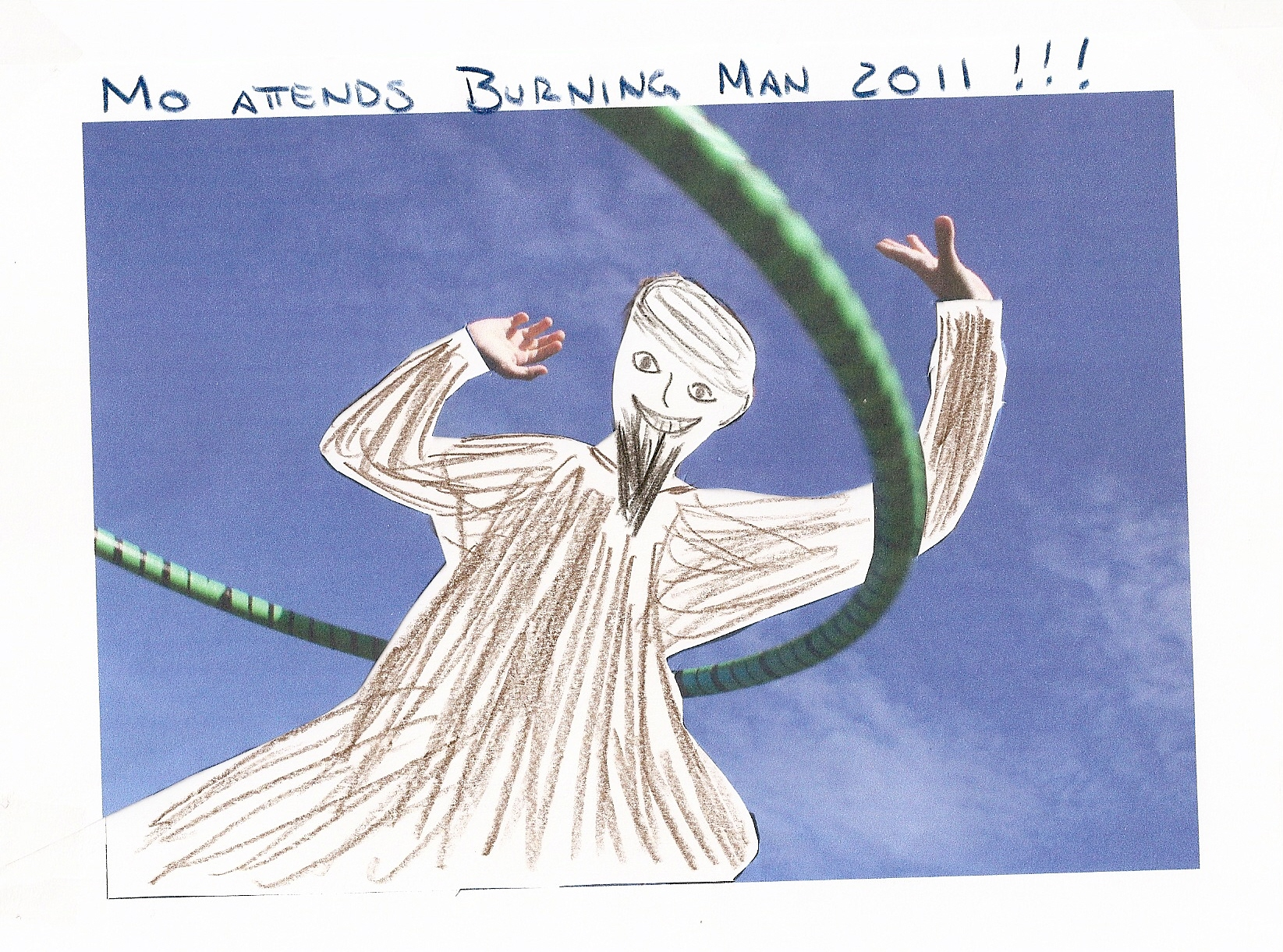
"Burning Mo," a stylistic representation making reference to the Burning Man

Drawing, by an individual from York, Pennsylvania

== See also ==
- Blasphemy Day
- Boobquake
- Charlie Hebdo shooting
- Criticism of Facebook
- Curtis Culwell Center attack
- Dove World Outreach Center Quran-burning controversy
- Flying Spaghetti Monster
- International Holocaust Cartoon Competition
- Israeli antisemitic cartoons contest
- Je suis Charlie
- Jyllands-Posten Muhammad cartoons controversy
- Lars Vilks Muhammad drawings controversy
- 2015 Copenhagen shootings
