= Françoise Pichard =

French cartoonist

Françoise Pichard (born 2 November 1941 in Lion-en-Sullias), also known as Chard and Pscharr, is a French far-right political cartoonist and illustrator of children books.

== Biography ==
Chard has published cartoons in Rivarol since 1967, in Présent since 1982, and in Signal d'Alarme since its foundation in 2006.

On 8 November 1994, she was found guilty and fined the equivalent of approximately €3000 by High Court of France, for complicity in "provoking discrimination, hatred or racial violence" against the black community, for a cartoon published on 4 March of the same year.

On 1 November 2006, she won second place in the Iranian 'International Holocaust Cartoon Competition' with an openly negationist cartoon, in a tie with Carlos Latuff. According to the Jerusalem Center for Public Affairs, her cartoon contains explicit Holocaust denial. On 3 November 2006, she denied having authorised entry of her cartoon in the competition and refused her prize.

== Compilations of political drawings ==
As "Chard"

- le Chardnaval de la V^{e} (drawings published in Rivarol)
- le Chardnaval socialiste (drawings published in Rivarol)
- Chard à la une de Présent (drawings published in Présent)
- Chard... gez ! : Chard 1989-1991 : le combat national en dessins, Éditions Nationales, Paris, 1991, 396 p. ISBN 2-909178-03-X
- 20 ans de malheur
- De droite à gauche, 1993-1997 : 215 dessins publiés dans "Rivarol", Éditions des Tuileries, Paris, 1997, 175 p. ISBN 2-9511633-0-4
- Sarko prézydent !, Éditions des Tuileries, Paris, 2004, 64 p.
