= Juliane Wetzel =

German historian (born 1957)

Juliane Wetzel (born 1957 in Munich) is a German historian.

Wetzel is a senior researcher at the Centre for Research on Antisemitism, Technische Universität Berlin.

Wetzel co-authored a March 2003 report on antisemitism in the European Union with Werner Bergmann in which they identified anti-globalization rallies as one of the sources of antisemitism on the left.

== Books ==
- Antisemitismus und radikaler Islamismus with Wolfgang Benz, Essen : Klartext, 2007.
- Jüdisches Leben in München, 1945-1951 : Durchgangsstation oder Wiederaufbau? München : Kommissionsverlag Uni-Druck, 1987.
- (together with Angelika Königseder), Lebensmut im Wartesaal. Die jüdischen DPs (Displaced Persons) im Nachkriegsdeutschland, Fischer Taschenbuch Verlag: Frankfurt am Main 1994, ISBN 3-596-10761-X (reprint 2004).
- (together with Angelika Königseder), Waiting for Hope. Jewish Displaced Persons in Post-World War II Germany, Evanston /Ill. 2001 (Northwestern University Press).
