= Maziyar Bizhani =

Cartoonist

Maziar Bijani (born 1973) is an Iranian cartoonist who publishes in newspapers such as Kayhan. He is known for his bitter criticism of reformers and pro-Western capitalists. Before becoming a cartoonist, he studied politics. Bijani's work has been featured in various websites promoting Palestinian resistance to the Israeli occupation. He has been accused of anti-semitism.

== Work ==
On September 26, 2008, Iran released a satirical book of cartoons on the Holocaust illustrated by Bizhani. The book's release was celebrated as part of Iran's Quds Day. In August 2010, the website Holocartoons was launched. The website contains illustrations from the book.

== See also ==
- Holocartoons
- Israel and apartheid
