= Mahir Zeynalov =

American journalist, media owner, entrepreuner

- Born: Mahir Zeynalov; Baku, Azerbaijan
- Occupations: Entrepreuner, Media
- Years active: 2005-present
- Notable credit(s): Today's Zaman newspaper, correspondent (2008–2016); Los Angeles Times, (2005) Globe Post Media, CEO (2017–)

Mahir Zeynalov is a Washington D.C.–based journalist, entrepreneur and a press freedom advocate. Zeynalov is currently the CEO of Globe Post Media, a columnist for Al Arabiya and writing for Huffington Post . He rose to international prominence for documenting the massive crackdown on journalists and he is best known for his works on authoritarian regimes. His work on Turkey is closely followed in the West. He founded one of the world's largest defense news networks.

== Career ==
Zeynalov started his professional career with the Los Angeles Times. He later joined Today's Zaman and worked there until the Turkish government shut down the newspaper in 2016. He has written columns for Al Arabiya since 2013 and regularly contributes to Huffington Post. He is a frequent commentator on the world's major radio and TV channels, including CNN, BBC, Al Jazeera, NBC and CBC. He was twice recognized among 100 people to follow by the Foreign Policy magazine. Mashable also listed Zeynalov in among 14 "reliable sources" to follow regarding Syria. He has an expertise on electoral systems and populist autocratic regimes.

In 2017, Zeynalov founded Globe Post Media, a publishing house of single-subject and niche media publications, including The Defense Post, which has become one of the world's premier news outlets on defense and security.

== Deportation from Turkey ==
Zeynalov, who was born in the Soviet Union, had been subject to a massive smear campaign since Gezi summer protests erupted in June 2013 for criticizing the government of Recep Tayyip Erdogan. When a corruption scandal broke out in December 2013, Erdogan sued Zeynalov for posting a news report on the graft allegations, seeking up to six years in prison.

Zeynalov posted a Twitter message on 25 December 2013, criticizing newly appointed police chiefs for refusing to comply with orders of prosecutors. Zeynalov's tweet was about corruption charges against public employees and a Saudi businessman, Yasin al-Qadi who was listed by the U.S. as a Specially Designated Global Terrorist. Zeynalov was targeted by pro-government media in a smear campaign and immediately sued by Erdoğan.

In late January, Zeynalov was called in to the police to testify. Prosecutors have not yet dropped charges against Zeynalov.

On 4 February 2014, the Turkish government decided to deport Zeynalov. On 7 February 2014, Zeynalov and his wife surrendered to the Istanbul police and were deported. Deputy Prime Minister Bülent Arınç argued that Zeynalov was working in Turkey illegally and that he was deported because his visa was expired.

Erdoğan denied during his parliamentary speech that his government deported Zeynalov. He called Zeynalov a "liar" and argued that he has no idea about a tweet posted by the journalist, although he sued Zeynalov over those tweets.

Turkish lawmaker and opposition politician Sezgin Tanrıkulu submitted a parliamentary inquiry, demanding the government to explain on what grounds they deported Zeynalov. Turkish Deputy Prime Minister Arınç acknowledged in a parliamentary response that the government deported Zeynalov, contradicting Erdoğan's previous statement, saying that his visa was expired.

== Reaction ==
A number of international public figures, including international soccer star Hakan Şükür, lawmaker İdris Bal, European Parliament's rapporteur on Turkey Ria Oomen-Ruijten slammed the government for deporting Zeynalov.

Turkey's opposition leader Kemal Kılıçdaroğlu commended Zeynalov, calling him "brave" and described Erdogan as a "coward" for the deportation decision.

The New York Times included Zeynalov among outspoken journalists Nazlı Ilıcak and Mehmet Baransu, both of whom were later imprisoned, for continuing covering the corruption scandal despite pressure on the media. Government's repressive treatment of Zeynalov was widely covered on the international media, including The New York Times, The Wall Street Journal, The Economist, Financial Times, The New Yorker, Reuters, Associated Press and BBC.

Many international press advocacy and human rights groups criticized the Turkish government for Zeynalov's deportation, including the Committee to Protect Journalists, the Amnesty International, Human Rights Watch, Freedom House, OSCE, International Press Institute, European Parliament, Reporters Without Borders, Union of German Journalists, Russian Union of Journalists, Turkish Journalists Association, Media Ethics Council and Contemporary Journalists Association.

While the French government criticized the Zeynalov's deportation, the US State Department described the pressure on Zeynalov as "unsettling."

== Documenting Turkey's press freedom violations ==
Two weeks after the failed coup attempt in Turkey on 15 July, Mahir Zeynalov started documenting the arrest of journalists. He shared handcuffed photos of journalists as they were escorted to the prison, and added a brief message about their career. The chronicling of these journalists quickly went viral across the world. It caused such an outrage all around the world that CNN and Al Jazeera extensively covered Zeynalov's work. His work about the arrest of journalists made into front pages of hundreds of international newspapers the next day.

== Battle with Twitter ==
In September 2016, Twitter informed Zeynalov that they shut down his Turkish account within Turkey and that they received a separate Turkish court decision to block access to his another account, in which he is tweeting in English. He has a quarter million followers combined.

Zeynalov's readers in the West launched a campaign to support the journalist against Twitter, forcing the social media giant to cave in. Twitter later announced that it won't block Zeynalov's English-language account. Washington Post published an editorial about this incident, urging Twitter not to bow to pressure by "a tyrant"—Erdogan.

== Globe Post Media ==
In 2016, Zeynalov co-founded Globe Post Media in the United States. It is an umbrella organization for multiple single-subject news outlets, of which The Globe Post is the flagship.
