= Israeli antisemitic cartoons contest =

Graphic arts contest

The Israeli Anti-Semitic Cartoons Contest (Hebrew: תחרות קריקטורות אנטישמיות ישראלית) was a cartoon contest initiated by two Israeli artists in response to the Muhammad cartoons controversy and the subsequent Holocaust cartoon competition by the Iranian newspaper Hamshahri. Illustrator Amitai Sandy announced the contest on the website of his Tel Aviv-based graphic arts company on February 14, 2006, stating, "We'll show the world we can do the best, sharpest, most offensive Jew hating cartoons ever published! No Iranian will beat us on our home turf!"

The Jerusalem Post reported Sandy as saying that his intention was to challenge bigotry by using humour. According to Haaretz, within three days of the announcement of the contest, Sandy was interviewed by more than thirty daily newspapers, as well as two television channels and a radio program broadcast on 450 local stations in the United States.

On April 6, 2006, the winner was announced on the contest homepage: "Fiddler on the Roof". It depicted a fiddler on the Brooklyn Bridge during the September 11 attacks on the World Trade Center.

Other common themes through the cartoons included world domination, the myth of Jews having horns, the Holocaust (and its denial), and the blood libel, all of which were familiar staples or topics of antisemitism. Many of those staples were canards as well.
