= Bhojpuri =

Bhojpuri may refer to:

- Bhojpuri language, an Indo-Aryan language of India and Nepal
  - Bhojpuri grammar, grammatical rules of the language
  - Bhojpuri nouns, nouns of the language
- Bhojpuri people, people who speak the language
- Bhojpuri region or Bhojpur region, a region of India
- Bhojpuri music, music of India
- Bhojpuri cinema, Bhojpuri-language cinema, part of Indian cinema
- Bhojpuri cuisine, cuisine of the people
- Bhojpuri literature, literature in the language
- Bhojpuri Channel, an Indian TV channel
- Bhojpuri, Rajasthan, a village in Rajasthan, India

== See also ==
- Bhojpur (disambiguation)
