= Bhojpur =

Bhojpur may refer to the following places:

== India ==
- Bhojpur, Bihar
- Bhojpur, Madhya Pradesh
  - Bhojpur, Madhya Pradesh Assembly constituency
- Bhojpur Stupas
- Bhojpur, Orissa
- Bhojpur Dharampur, a town and a nagar panchayat in Moradabad district of Uttar Pradesh
  - Bhojpur, Uttar Pradesh Assembly constituency
- Bhojpuri region, a region in northern India where Bhojpuri language is spoken
  - Bhojpur district, India, in Bhojpur region of Bihar state
- Bhojpur, Raebareli, a village in Raebareli district of Uttar Pradesh

== Nepal ==
- Bhojpur District, Nepal, a district in Province No. 1, Nepal
- Bhojpur Municipality, a municipality in Bhojpur district of Nepal
- Bhojpur, Nepal, a neighborhood in Bhojpur Municipality

== See also ==
- Bhojpuri (disambiguation)
- Bhojpur District (disambiguation)
- Bhojpur Assembly constituency (disambiguation)
- Bhoja (disambiguation)
- Pur (disambiguation)
