= Bhoja (disambiguation) =

Bhoja (fl. 1000–1050) was a philosopher king and polymath of the Paramara Dynasty.

Bhoja or Bhoj may also refer to:

== People ==
Gurjara-Pratihara kings

- Mihira Bhoja or Bhoja I (836–885), emperor of the Gurjara-Pratihara Dynasty
- Bhoja II (Gurjara-Pratihara dynasty) (910–913), king of Gurjara-Pratihara Dynasty

Shilahara kings

- Bhoja I, 11th century Shilahara king of southern Maharashtra
- Bhoja II (Shilahara dynasty) (1175–1212), last ruler of the Shilahara dynasty

Others

- Bhoja II (Paramara dynasty), 13th century CE; a descendant of the Paramara king Bhoja
- Bhoja Varman, 13th century Chandela king
- Bhoj Raj (fl. 1516–1526), eldest son of Rana Sanga, ruler of Mewar
- Bhoja Bhagat (1785–1850), Hindu saint, social reformer, and poet
- Bhoja of Kannauj, 9th century Kannauj king

== Other uses ==
- Bhoja Air, a Pakistani airline
- Bhojas of Goa, a dynasty that ruled Goa and parts of Konkan and Karnataka from the 3rd to 6th century
- Bhoj, India, a village in Belgaum District, Karnataka
- Bhoj Wetland, two lakes in Bhopal, Madhya Pradesh, India
- Kunti-Bhoja (Kuntibhoja), foster-father of Kunti, the mother of the Pandavas in Hindu mythology

== See also ==
- Bhoja II (disambiguation)
- Bhojpur (disambiguation)
