= Sundarbag =

Village in Kaimur district of Bihar, India

Sundarbag is a small village of the Kushwaha community in Kaimur district of Bihar, India. The village is located on a very important road which connects GT road, a national highway at Kudra (a railway station) to one of the state highway at Parsathua. This region comes under the rice and wheat basket of Bihar, very rich in land fertility. It has well-developed canal irrigation and pumping groundwater. It has a population of approximately 150. The main economic activity of the villagers is agricultural. Many households are engaged in other activities, like business and food processing activities, while some households are under service sector—serving as teacher, lawyer, and other government services. The reach of electricity is major force of transformation in the life of villagers but the traditional way of living is still prominent. Parsathua is a market near Sundarbag.
