= Mahabirganj =

Mahabirganj Mahābīrganj
- Village
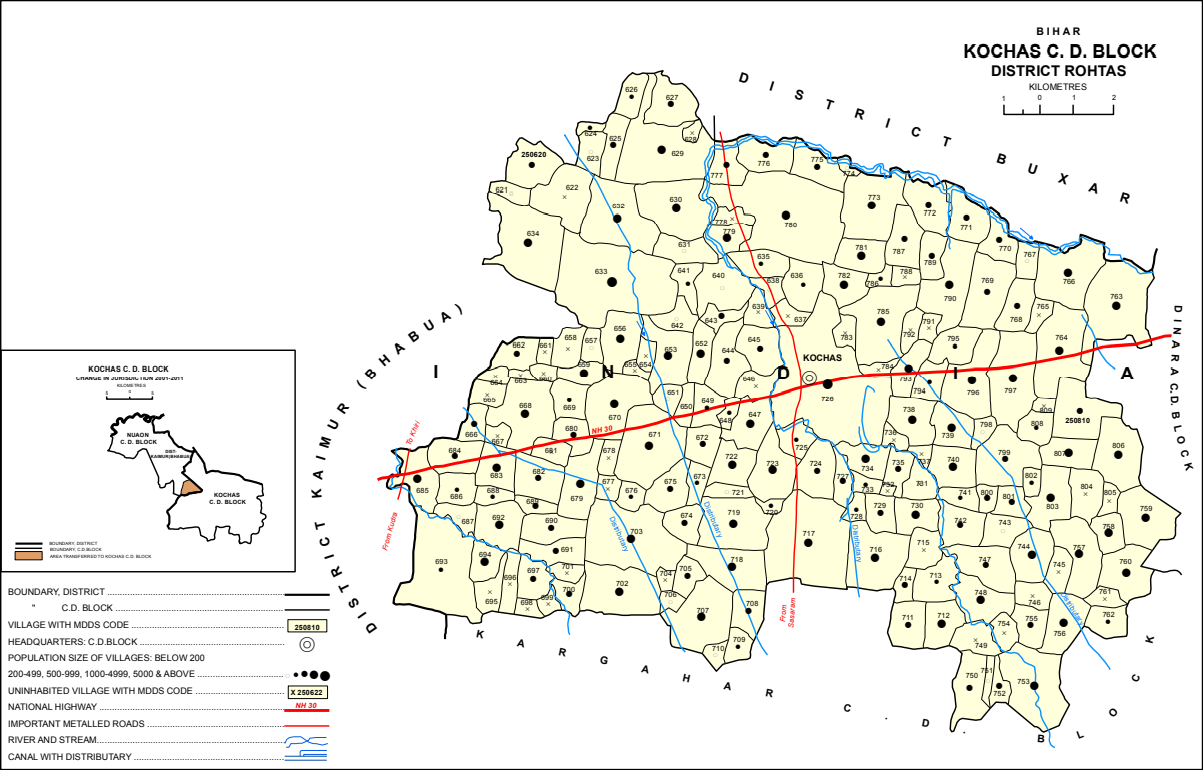
- Map of Kochas block. Mahabirganj is counted as part of Parsathua, here numbered 685 in the southwestern part of the block.

- Location in Bihar, India Mahabirganj (India)
- Coordinates: 25.21763°N 83.82196°E
- Country: India
- State: Bihar
- District: Bhojpur
- Elevation: 77 m (253 ft)

Languages
  - Official: Bhojpuri, Hindi
- Time zone: UTC+5:30 (IST)

Mahabirganj is a village with a population of 225 lies in north east corner of Parsathua market in Rohtas district in the Indian state of Bihar. It is 41 km from the district headquarters Sasaram and 22 km from Kudra and the same distance from Mohania, the location of Bhabua Road railway station. This village is situated around 0.5 km north of National Highway 30. The nearest market, Parsathua, is 1.25 km from here, the nearest school colleges are 1.25 km away and the nearest hospital is 11 km away. An electric distribution center is the main landmark of this village. There is no water supply and the village can be reached by bus or minibus. This village is still not connected with National Highway 30, despite its distance from this Highway being hardly 500 m. There are virtually no government plans which facilitate this village's well-being. There is a lack of basic facilities in this village, such as a primary school, pukka lanes, drainage systems, a hospital, or playgrounds. Villagers have pushed many times for funding for these facilities, but to no avail. Political Parties visit the village during election-cycle and forget about it afterward. The primary means of livings are cultivation and animal husbandry. The level of education is average here.
