= S. D. Phadnis =

Indian cartoonist and illustrator (born 1925)

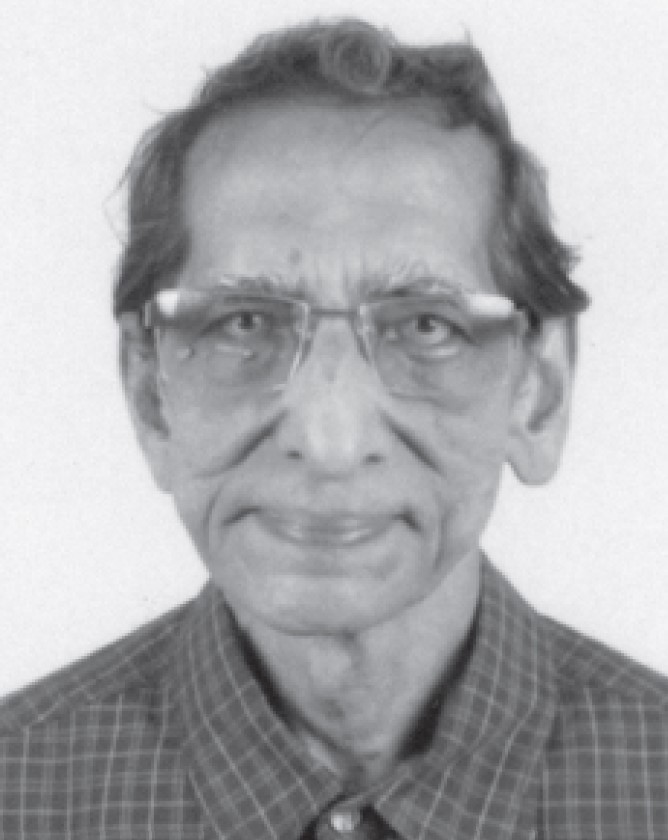
- Born: 29 July 1925 (age 101); Bhoj, Belgaum district, Bombay Presidency (now in Karnataka)
- Education: Sir J. J. School of Art, Mumbai
- Notable work: Laughing Gallery; Miskil Gallery
- Website: sdphadnis.com

Shivram Dattatreya Phadnis (born 29 July 1925), known as S. D. Phadnis, is an Indian cartoonist and illustrator. He is known for his captionless and painted cartoons, which mainly featured on magazine covers. The illustrations created by Phadnis for Mohini magazine established a new tradition of Marathi magazine covers. They proved that cartoons can be as charming and visually pleasing as a painting without the support of words. With a career spanning more than 60 years, he has contributed to the Marathi publishing industry and cartooning community as a whole. As of April 2023, he lives and works in Pune.

== Early life and education ==
Phadnis was born on 29 July 1925 in the village of Bhoj, Belgaum district, Bombay Presidency (now in Karnataka). After spending a few years at his birth place, he moved to Kolhapur from where he passed his matriculation examination in 1944. Phadnis then joined Sir J. J. School of Art in Bombay and obtained a G. D. in Commercial Art in 1949.

== Career ==
While studying at Sir J. J. School of Art, Phadnis sent a cartoon to Manohar magazine in 1945, without any expectations. Motivated by seeing this artwork published, he occasionally sent comic strips to magazines that became popular. Among those magazines was Hans, which was run by Anant Antarkar. On Antarkar's instructions, Phadnis created a full-page coloured illustration that was published on the cover of the June 1951 issue of the magazine. This was the beginning of latter's work with humorous, multi-coloured covers.

=== Breakthrough with Mohini magazine ===
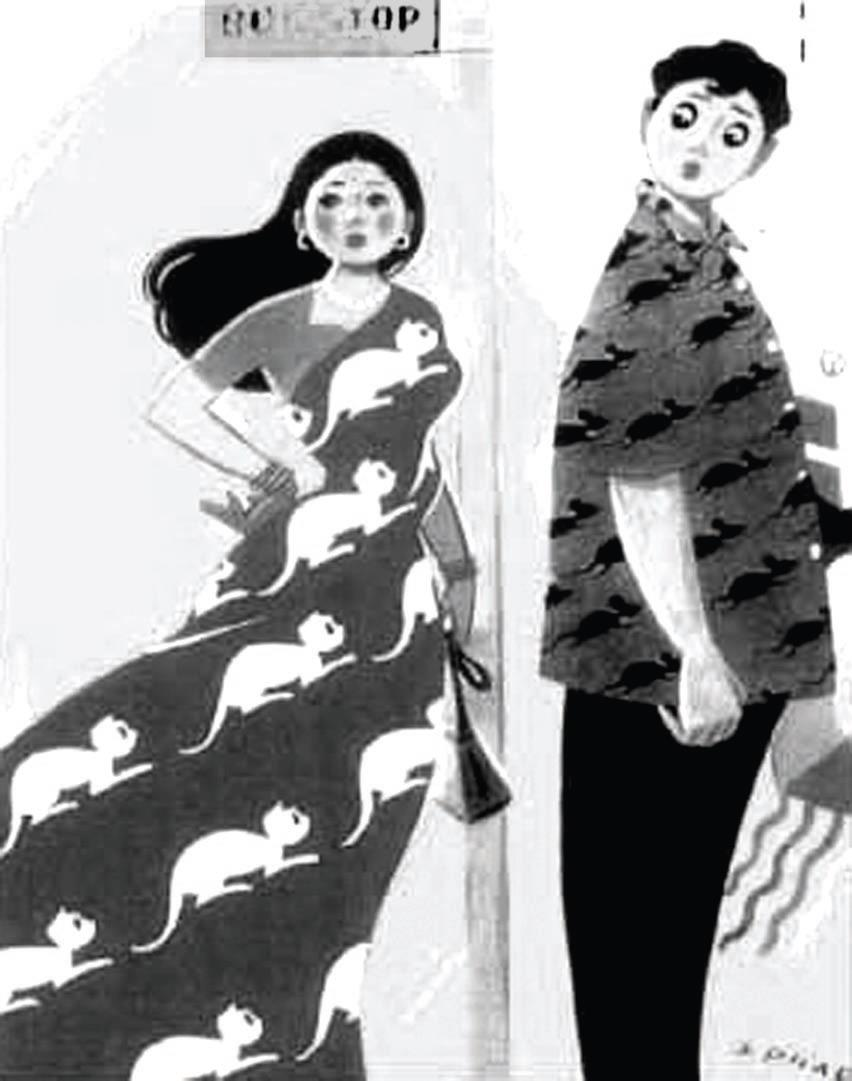
B&W reproduction of the cartoon which was created by Phadnis for the cover of Mohini in 1952.

In the early 1950s, Antarkar had founded another magazine called Mohini. This was the time when the covers of the Diwali magazines traditionally featured images of beautiful young ladies or popular film actresses. Phadnis designed a cartoon for the 1952 Diwali issue of this magazine. It showcased a man wearing a mouse print shirt and woman wearing a cat print sari who were standing side by side at a bus stop. Not only did this creation break the existing trend, but was also well received by the audience. This was the beginning of what was to develop as a trend in terms of Diwali issue covers.

While working in Mumbai, Phadnis felt that the climate and lifestyle of the city did not suit him, so he set up his studio in Kolhapur for a few years. Around the same time, Antarkar had decided to shift his residence from Mumbai and settle in Pune. With Antarkar’s inspiration and encouragement, Phadnis also shifted to Pune and settled there. Following this move, it was mutually decided that cartoons by Phadnis would be printed in every month's issue of Mohini. This partnership lasted for more than 50 years. Even though the monthly magazine of Mohini has been discontinued, the cover of its Diwali issue continues to feature the work of Phadnis, which is published annually. In addition to this, Phadnis has also created cartoons and illustrations for other clients during his career.

=== Other works ===
Phadnis drew political and social cartoons based on the events of the time for the Marathi weeklies Manoos and Sobat between 1963 and 1975. Moreover, he also drew cartoons for books on subjects that were not linked to humour, such as science, banking, grammar, management, law and philosophy. The illustrations by Phadnis helped to make these seemingly complicated subjects easier to understand, such as the elementary mathematics books that he illustrated for the state of Maharashtra. His illustrations in these books made the concepts of mathematics understandable and interesting to elementary school children, and showed how the common perception that mathematics is a difficult and abstract subject is wrong. In the twenty years since their publication, numerous copies of these illustrated books in eight languages have spread across far-flung villages.

=== Style and themes ===
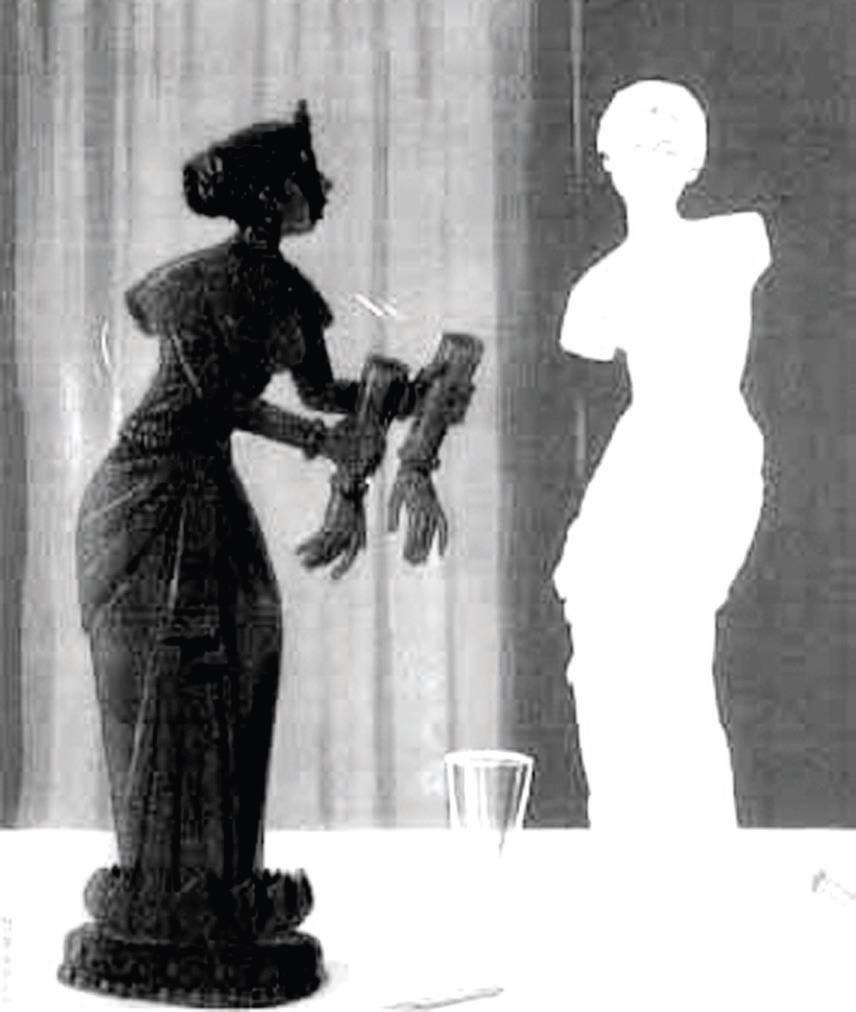
B&W reproduction of a cartoon by S. D. Phadnis created for Rasik magazine in November 1976.

The cartoons created by Phadnis are mostly wordless and others use minimal words. At the same time, he shows that even a cartoon can be as charming and visually pleasing as a painting. In order to achieve this, he uses figurative sketching style. Characters that fit this style of painting are seen in his cartoons. They depict simple and cultured people who make fun of each other and face the troubles of the world with amusement. Phadnis uses minimal details, which are enough to convey the characterization as well as composition in the pictures. In his cartoons, Phadnis depicts events that take place in the life of a middle-class household with protagonists who face the adverse situations and difficulties playfully. Eventually, his cartoons enabled the viewers to understand the humour in an image just by looking at it.

=== Promotion of cartoons ===
Phandis regretted the fact that the pictorial culture had not assimilated among the masses. Phadnis presented several informative programs on cartoons and caricature for UGC, on Doordarshan and other channels. From 1966 to 1972 he persuaded the government to waive the entertainment tax on art exhibitions, who eventually accepted this demand. Phadnis also helped establish the law via the court-office that the painter owned the copyright of their paintings and its prints.

=== Exhibitions ===
In February 1965, Phadnis put up his first exhibition titled Hasari Gallery (Laughing Gallery) at Jahangir Art Gallery in Mumbai, which showcased the original artworks of his cartoons. Along with static images, it also included works powered by electricity, using mirrors, and some moving images. Hasari Gallery toured across several cities across the country. Along with his wife Shakuntala, Phadnis created a program called Chitrahas, which introduced cartoons with the help of demonstrations and coloured slides as an alternative to an exhibition. They performed more than 150 shows in Maharashtra and other states. Additionally, they also performed Chitrahas in New York and six other cities in the US, as well as in London for the Maharashtra Mandal. Phadnis’ cartoons have been displayed several times in international cartoon exhibitions at Montreal and Germany.

=== Awards ===
Phadnis was honored with several awards during his career. In 1954, Communication Arts Guild presented him with an Outstanding Editorial Art Award for his coloured cartoon on the cover of Mohini’s Diwali issue; Lifetime Achievement Award from the Indian Institute of Cartoonists in 2001. Phadnis and his wife Shakuntala were honored with Mukund Gokhale Smriti Yashwant-Venu Award in 2018.

== Personal life ==
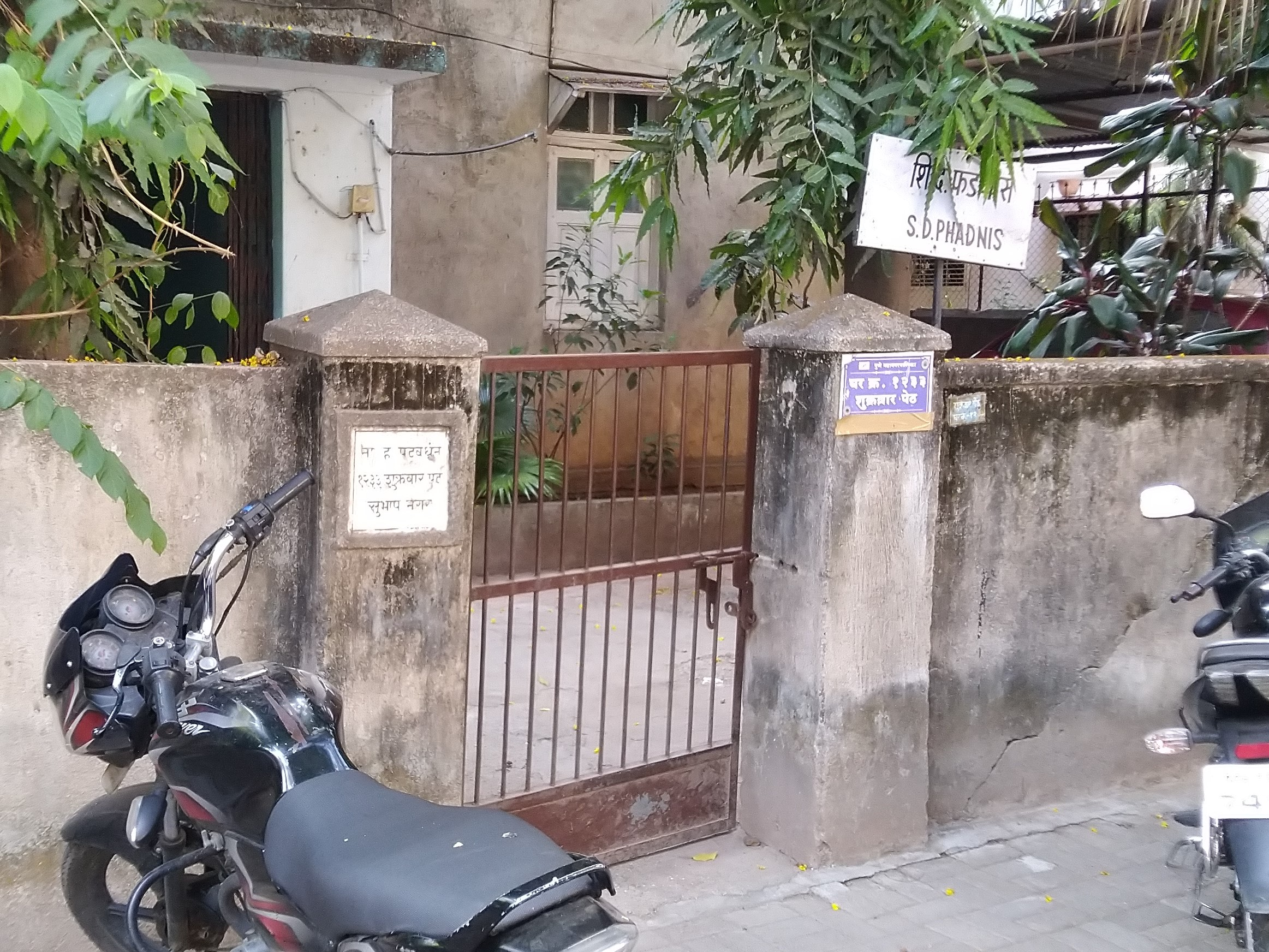
Gate to residence of S. D. Phadnis in Pune. A signboard with his name in English and Devanagari can be seen on the right.

Phadnis is married to Shakuntala and has two daughters. In his autobiography titled Reshatan: Athavanincha Pravas (A journey down memory lane), Phadnis has documented his journey of more than 60 years as a cartoonist and his work for the rights of cartoonists.

On July 29, 2025, Phadnis turned 100.

== Bibliography ==
- Painting for Children 1 (2007)
- Painting for Children 2 (2007)
- Laughing Gallery
- Miskil Gallery
- Reshatan (2011)
- Phadnis Gallery (2014)
