= Akhtiarpur =

Village in Bihar, India

Akhtiarpur or Akhtiyarpur is a village in Rohtas district in the Indian state of Bihar. Its Census population in 2011 was 1,073. The nearest railway station is in Kudra.

This village is 5 km far away from NH-2 (Grand Trunk Road) which connects this village to Varanasi city (i.e. approx 90 km).

Literacy is excellent. It is above 90%.
