= Chhatauna =

- Village
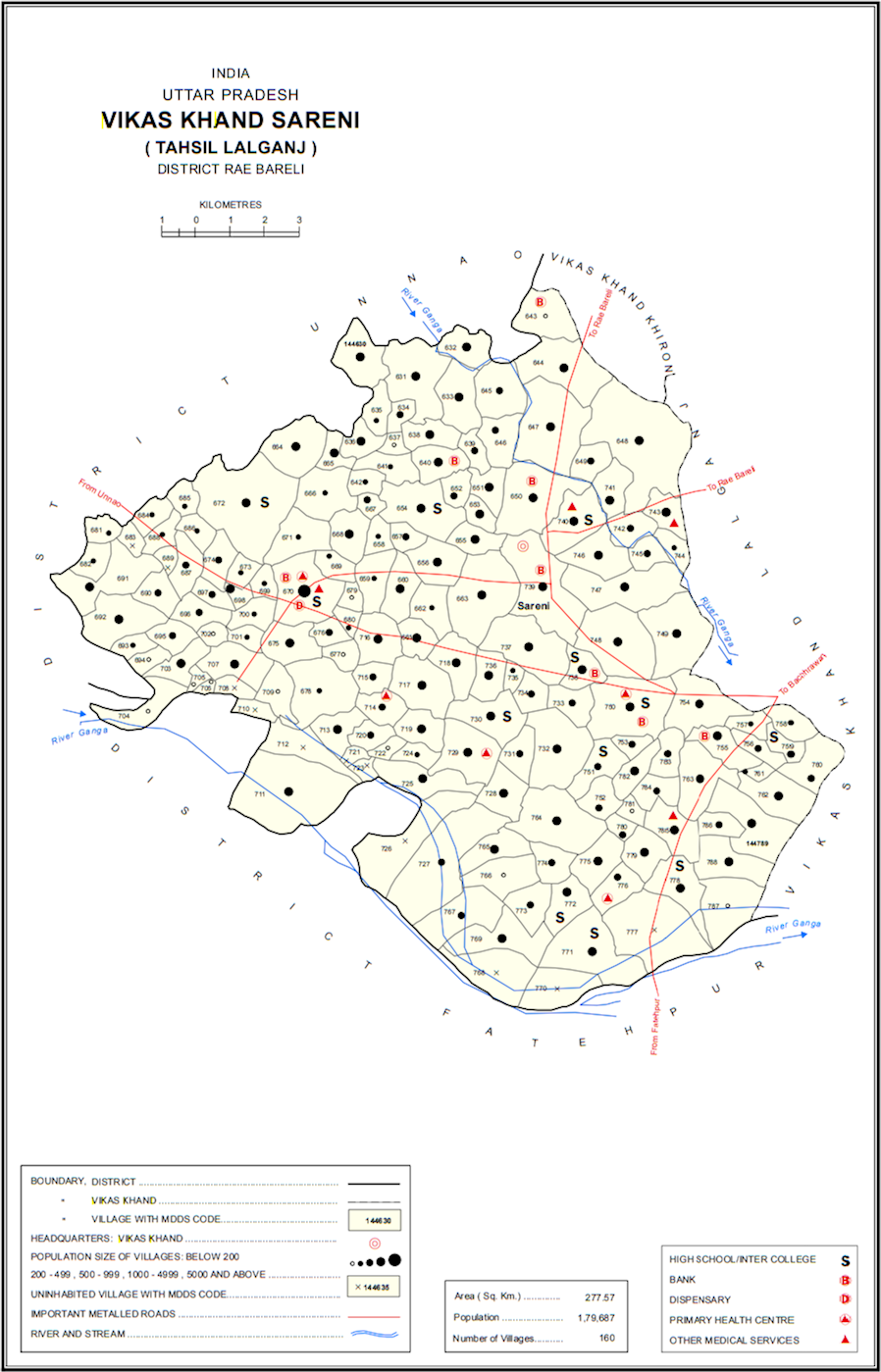
- Map showing Chhatauna (#668) in Sareni CD block

- Location in Uttar Pradesh, India
- Coordinates: 26°09′22″N 80°46′32″E
- Country: India
- State: Uttar Pradesh
- District: Raebareli

Area
  - Total: 0.759 km^{2} (0.293 sq mi)

Population (2011)
  - Total: 1,002
  - Density: 1,320/km^{2} (3,420/sq mi)

Languages
  - Official: Hindi
- Time zone: UTC+5:30 (IST)
- Vehicle registration: UP-33

Chhatauna is a village in the Sareni block of Rae Bareli district, in the Indian state Uttar Pradesh. It is located 24 km from Lalganj, the tehsil headquarters. As of 2011, it has a population of 1,002 people, in 182 households. It has one primary school and no healthcare facilities, and does not host a permanent market or a weekly haat. It belongs to the nyaya panchayat of Bhojpur.

The 1951 census recorded Chhatauna as comprising 4 hamlets, with a population of 285 people (133 male and 152 female), in 55 households and 37 physical houses. The area of the village was given as 189 acres. 11 residents were literate, all male. The village was listed as belonging to the pargana of Sareni and the thana of Sareni.

The 1961 census recorded Chhatauna as comprising 3 hamlets, with a total population of 374 people (187 male and 187 female), in 57 households and 42 physical houses. The area of the village was given as 189 acres.

The 1981 census recorded Chhatauna as having a population of 433 people, in 60 households, and having an area of 75.68 hectares. The main staple foods were given as wheat and rice.

The 1991 census recorded Chhatauna as having a total population of 719 people (355 male and 364 female), in 93 households and 93 physical houses. The area of the village was listed as 76 hectares. Members of the 0-6 age group numbered 211, or 29% of the total; this group was 49% male (103) and 51% female (108). Members of scheduled castes made up 32% of the village's population, while no members of scheduled tribes were recorded. The literacy rate of the village was 33% (149 men and 89 women). 172 people were classified as main workers (145 men and 27 women), while 0 people were classified as marginal workers; the remaining 547 residents were non-workers. The breakdown of main workers by employment category was as follows: 97 cultivators (i.e. people who owned or leased their own land); 54 agricultural labourers (i.e. people who worked someone else's land in return for payment); 0 workers in livestock, forestry, fishing, hunting, plantations, orchards, etc.; 0 in mining and quarrying; 6 household industry workers; 1 worker employed in other manufacturing, processing, service, and repair roles; 0 construction workers; 1 employed in trade and commerce; 0 employed in transport, storage, and communications; and 13 in other services.
