= Nishan Singh Stadium =

Multi-purpose stadium in Kudra, Bihar, India

- Interactive map of Nishan Singh Stadium
- Full name: Nishan Singh Stadium
- Location: Kudra, Kaimur Bihar
- Coordinates: 25.0488°N 83.7870°E
- Capacity: 5,000

Nishan Singh Stadium is a multi-purpose stadium in city of Kudra, Bihar. The ground is mainly used for local cricket matches. The ground is mainly used for organizing matches of football, cricket and other sports. The ground has floodlights so that the stadium can host day-night matches. It is made considering all norms of Board of Control for Cricket in India so that Ranji Trophy matches can be played.
