= Ghatawan =

Ghatawan Ghatāwān
- Village
- Location in Bihar, India Ghatawan (India)
- Coordinates: 25.09677°N 83.72659°E
- Country: India
- State: Bihar
- District: Kaimur

Area
  - Total: 4.33 km^{2} (1.67 sq mi)
- Elevation: 89 m (292 ft)

Population (2011)
  - Total: 9,997
  - Density: 2,310/km^{2} (5,980/sq mi)

Languages
  - Official: Bhojpuri, Hindi
- Time zone: UTC+5:30 (IST)

Ghatawan (also spelled Ghataon) is a large village in the western part of Kudra block, in Kaimur district, Bihar, India. As of 2011, its population was 9,997, in 1,551 households.
