= Bhojpur District =

Bhojpur District may refer to:

- Bhojpur district, India
- Bhojpur District, Nepal

== See also ==
- Bhojpur (disambiguation)
