= Chilbili =

- Village
- Location in Bihar, India Chilbili (India)
- Coordinates: 25.05724°N 83.77073°E
- Country: India
- State: Bihar
- District: Kaimur

Area
  - Total: 3.50 km^{2} (1.35 sq mi)
- Elevation: 87 m (285 ft)

Population (2011)
  - Total: 2,427
  - Density: 693/km^{2} (1,800/sq mi)

Languages
  - Official: Bhojpuri, Hindi
- Time zone: UTC+5:30 (IST)

Chilbili is a village in Kudra block of Kaimur district, Bihar, India. As of 2011, its population was 2,427, in 428 households.
