= Bhojpur Assembly constituency =

Bhojpur Assembly constituency may refer to

- Bhojpur, Madhya Pradesh Assembly constituency
- Bhojpur, Uttar Pradesh Assembly constituency

== See also ==
- Bhojpur (disambiguation)
