= Parsathua =

- Village
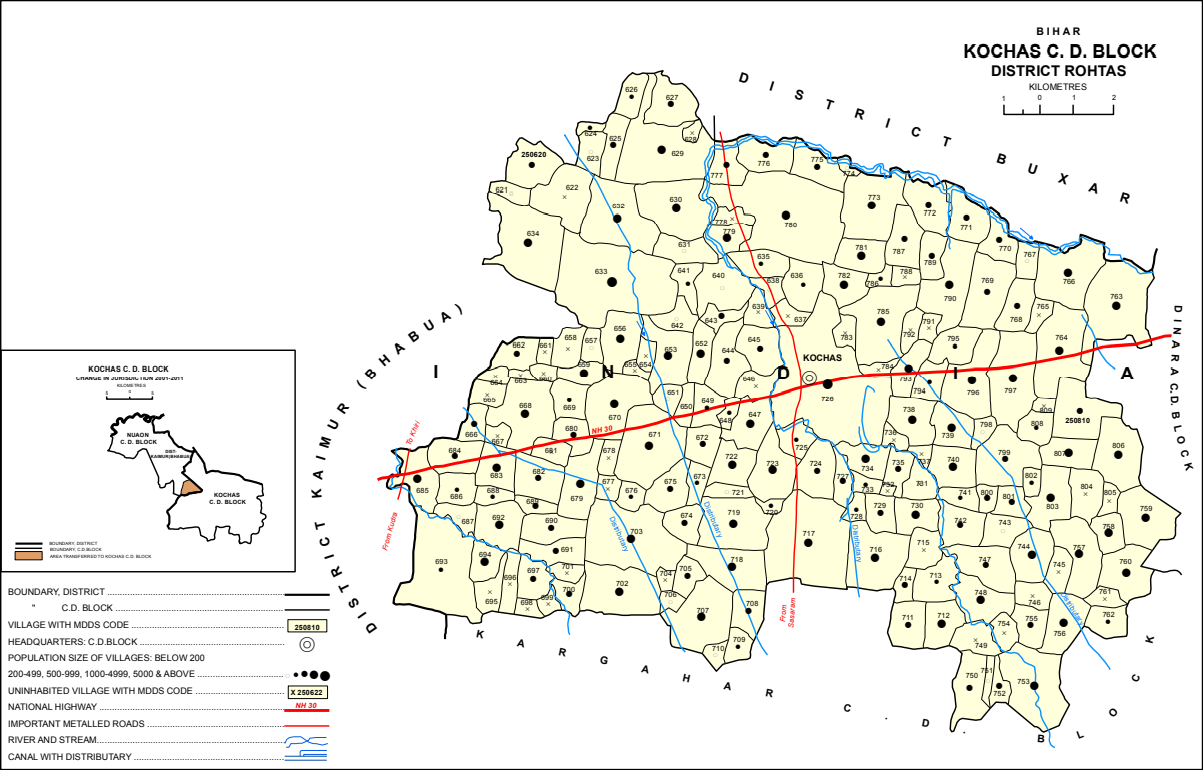
- Map of Parsathua (#685) in Kochas block

- Location in Bihar, India Parsathua (India)
- Coordinates: 25.21089°N 83.80939°E
- Country: India
- State: Bihar
- District: Bhojpur

Area
  - Total: 1.6794 km^{2} (0.6484 sq mi)
- Elevation: 76 m (249 ft)

Population (2011)
  - Total: 4,762
  - Density: 2,836/km^{2} (7,344/sq mi)

Languages
  - Official: Bhojpuri, Hindi
- Time zone: UTC+5:30 (IST)

Parsathua is a village in Kochas block of Rohtas district in Bihar, India. As of 2011, its population was 4,762, in 719 households. It has a regular mandi and a weekly haat. Drinking water is provided by hand pump. The village's area covers an area of 167.94 hectares, of which most is farmland: 163.9 ha are under cultivation, and 159.1 are irrigated. 1.1 ha consists of permanent pastures, and 0.4 ha consists of orchards. An area of 0.9 ha is devoted to non-agricultural use.

== See also ==
- Mahabirganj — village administratively counted under Parsathua
