= Bhoja II =

Bhoja II may refer to any of the following Indian kings:

- Bhoja II (Gurjara-Pratihara dynasty), 910–913 CE
- Bhoja II (Shilahara dynasty), 1175–1212 CE
- Bhoja II (Paramara dynasty), 13th century CE

== See also ==
- Bhoja (disambiguation)
