= Karadaga =

Village in Karnataka, India

- Village
- Location in Karnataka, India Karadaga (India)
- Coordinates: 16°33′58.111″N 74°26′46.591″E
- Country: India
- State: Karnataka
- District: Belgaum
- Talukas: Nipani

Population (2001)
  - Total: 8,949

Languages
  - Official: Kannada
- Time zone: UTC+5:30 (IST)
- Postal code: 591263

Karadaga is a village in the southern state of Karnataka, India. It is located in the Nipani taluk of Belgaum district in Karnataka. RIDASOFT SOLUTIONS

== Demographics ==
As of 2001 India census, Karadaga had a population of 8949 with 4606 males and 4343 females.

== See also ==
- Belgaum
- Districts of Karnataka
