= Bhojpur, Odisha =

Bhojpur
- Village
- Location in Odisha, India Bhojpur (India)
- Coordinates: 21°39′0″N 84°24′0″E
- Country: India
- State: Odisha
- District: Sambalpur
- Elevation: 269 m (883 ft)

Languages
  - Official: Odia
- Time zone: UTC+5:30 (IST)
- Vehicle registration: OD 15
- Website: odisha.gov.in

Bhojpur is a village in Sambalpur district, Odisha, India.

== Geography ==
It is located at 21°39′0″N 84°24′0″E, at an elevation of 269 m above MSL.

== Location ==
National Highway 200 passes through Bhojpur. It is 13 km from Kuchinda.
