= Bhojpuri grammar =

Grammatical rules and syntax in the Bhojpuri language

Bhojpuri grammar (Bhojpuri: भोजपुरी व्याकरण) is the grammar of the Bhojpuri language. In many aspects, it is quite similar to other Eastern Indo-Aryan languages. Modern Bhojpuri grammar was written in 1915 by Pt. Shivadas Ojha.

== Nouns ==
Nouns in Bhojpuri have three forms, viz. short, long and redundant. Thus, for ghōṛā ("horse"), the forms will be ghōṛā, ghoṛwā and ghoṛawā respectively. In some cases, the long form ends with /ē/, ghoṛwē. The redundant form has two more variants, /-ā/ and /-yā/. Thus for kukur ("a dog"), it can take the form kukurā and for māli ("a gardener") maliyā. /-ā/ is used with nouns which have a disyllabic structure like bhatār, bhatarā ("husband") or sonār, sonarā ("goldsmith"). The suffix /-yā/ is added to nouns ending in /-i/, including feminine forms derived by adding /-i/, like bētī, betiyā ("daughter") and aurat, auratiyā ("women"). The oblique forms of nouns are identical to the nominative with the exception of verbal nouns.

=== Definiteness ===
The redundant form, as it is called by Greirson, actually does the grammatical task of coding definiteness in the noun morphology. It is same as the definite articles the and la of English and French respectively. Thus, ghorawā is "the horse" and maliyā is "the gardener".

=== Morphology ===
To characterize nouns the suffixes -wala and -iya are extensively used. -wala is also used in Hindustani but its use is more extensive in Bhojpuri where it can replace the adjective-forming suffixes of borrowed words, e.g. /-dār/. For instance, Hindi: इज़्ज़तदार, romanized: izzatdār becomes ijjatwalā in Bhojpuri. The suffix /-iyā/ (also /-aiyā/, /-vaiyā/ variations) is also used extensively as characterizing suffix, as in kalkatiyā, characteristic or belonging to Kolkata, and puraniyā, characterized by old age.

=== Gender ===
The Animate nouns in Bhojpuri are gendered. Those referring to females are feminine and rest are masculine. The feminine is formed by adding /-i/, /-in/ and /-ni/ to masculine nouns, e.g. /ājā/ ("grandfather") → /ājī/ ("grandmother") or /māli - mālin/ and /babuā - babunī/ (boy - girl).

=== Number ===
To form the plural in Bhojpuri, the final long vowel is shortened and -n, -nh or -ni is added. In some cases, nouns of multitude like sabh (all) or lōg (people) are added to nouns to make plurals.

Definition	Singular Form (Short)	Singular Form (long)	Plural Form
House	ghar	gharwā	gharan/gharwan/ ghar sabh
Horse	ghoṛā	ghoṛwā	ghoṛan/ghoṛwan/ghōṛā sabh
Boy	laïkā	laïkwā	laïkan/laïka sabh
King	rājā	rajwā	rājā lōg

=== Cases ===
Cases are generally formed by adding postpositions to the Nominative case or the oblique form (if exists) of the nouns. Sometimes true cases are also found, such as an Instrumental and Locative formed by adding -ē, as in Bengali. Thus, the locative and Instrumental case of ghar ("house") is ghare ("in/by the house"). These case forms are only found in the singular, however.

Noun Inflection
	Short		Long	
	Singular	Plural	Singular	Plural
Nominative	𑂐𑂩 ghar the house	𑂐𑂩𑂢 gharana the Houses	𑂐𑂩𑂫𑂰 gharvā the House	𑂐𑂩𑂫𑂢 gharvana the Houses
Accusative	𑂐𑂩 𑂍𑂵/𑂍 ghar ke/ka' (to) the House	𑂐𑂩𑂢 𑂍𑂵/𑂍 gharan ke/ka (to) the houses	𑂐𑂩𑂫𑂰 𑂍𑂵/𑂍 gharvā ke/ka' (to) the House	𑂐𑂩𑂫𑂢 𑂍𑂵/𑂍 gharvana ke/ka' (to) the House
Genitive	𑂐𑂩 𑂍𑂵/𑂍 ghar ke/ka' (of) the House	𑂐𑂩𑂢 𑂍𑂵/𑂍 gharan ke/ka (of) the houses	𑂐𑂩𑂫𑂰 𑂍𑂵/𑂍 gharvā ke/ka' (of) the House	𑂐𑂩𑂫𑂢 𑂍𑂵/𑂍 gharvana ke/ka' (of) the House
Locative	𑂐𑂩 𑂧𑂵, 𑂐𑂩𑂵 ghar me, gharē (in/on) the House	𑂐𑂩𑂢 𑂧𑂵 gharan me (in/on) the houses	𑂐𑂩𑂫𑂰 𑂧𑂵 gharvā me' (in/on) the House	𑂐𑂩𑂫𑂢 𑂧𑂵 gharvana me' (in/on) the House

- To form the instrumental case; sē, tē, santē and kartē are also added to the noun forms, hence ghar se is to the house.
- To form the dative, lā, lag, khātir are added, ex:- ghar la (for the house)
- For the ablative case, sē, lē are added.

=== Noun Phrases ===
Nouns can be preceded by quantifiers. The quantifiers -gō, -ṭhō and -ṭhē are used with numeral to emphasize countability as opposed to totality. The limiter expression in Bhojpuri are marked morphologically by using the suffixes -ē and -ō, to show inclusiveness and exclusiveness respectively, as in ham āmē khāïb (I will eat only mangoes) and ham āmō khāïb (I will eat mango, too).

== Pronouns ==
=== Personal Pronouns ===
The first-person pronoun has two forms viz. inferior (mē) and superior (ham). The inferior form was used in Old Bhojpuri but is obsolete in Modern Bhojpuri and is mostly found in poetry. Ham is used as the first-person singular pronoun; the oblique form is Hamrā, however sometimes ham (ham-kē) also serves as oblique form. In the Sadri dialect, mōe is used instead of ham.

Number	Form	First Person		Second Person			Third Person		
Number	Form	Inferior	Superior	Inf.	Formal	Honorific	Inf.	Formal	Honorific
Singular	Nom.	मे (mē)	हम (ham)	तें (tēṃ)	तूँ (tūṃ)	रउवा (raüvā) / रवा (ravā) / रउरा (raürā) / अपने (apnē)	ई (ī), ऊ (ū)		इहाँ के (ihāṁ kē), उहाँ के (uhāṁ kē)
Singular	Obl.	मोहि (mohi) / मो (mō)	हमरा (hamrā)	तो (tō) / तोहि (tōhi) / तोरा (tōrā)	तोहरा (tohrā)	रउवा (raüvā) / रवा (ravā) / रउरा (raürā) / अपना (apnā)	ए (ē), एह (ēh), एकरा (ekrā), ओ (ō), ओह (ōh), ओकरा (okrā)	इन (in), इनका (inkā), इनकरा (inkarā), उन (un), उनका (unkā), उनकरा (unkarā)	इहाँ (ihāṁ), उहाँ (uhāṁ)
Singular	Gen.	मोर (mōr), मोरे (mōrē)	हमार (hamār) / हमरे (hamarē)	तोर (tōr) / तोरे (tōre)	तोहार (tohār) / तोहरे (tohrē)	राउर (rāür) / रउरे (raürē) / अपने के (apnē kē)	एकर (ekar), ओकर (okar)	इनकर (inkar), उनकर (unkar)	इहाँ के (ihāṁ kē), उहाँ के (uhāṁ kē)
Plural	Nom.	हमनी के (hamnī kē)	हमहन (hamhan)	तोहनी के (tohnī ke)	तूँ लोग (tuṃ lōg)	रउरा सभ/लोग, अपने सभ/लोग (raürā sabh/lōg, apnē sabh/log)	एकनी के (ekanī kē), ओकनी के (okanī kē)	इ लोग (I Iōg), उ लोग (u lōg)	इहाँ सभ (ihāṁ sabh), उहाँ सभ (uhāṁ sabh)
Plural	Obl.	हमनी (hamnī)	हमहन (hamhan)	तोहनी (tohnī)	तूँ लोग (tūṃ lōg)	रउरा सभ/लोग, अपने सभ/लोग (raürā sabh/lōg, apnē sabh/log)	एकनी (ekanī), ओकनी (okanī)	इ लोग (I Iōg), उ लोग (u lōg)	इहाँ सभ (ihāṁ sabh), उहाँ सभ (uhāṁ sabh)

In the second person, tē is the most non-honorific form, used toward people younger than the speaker, to servants, and also while speaking disrespectfully. It can also show deep affection, informality and intimacy in a relationship. For instance, a son always uses tē for his mother. tū is ordinarily respectful term and can be used to address anyone, whether younger or older. To show extreme respect or honour, raüwā or apnē is used. The demonstrative pronouns ī and ū are used as third-person pronouns in Modern Bhojpuri; the sē and tē of Old Bhojpuri survive but are not used frequently or mostly only in a proverbial sense. For instance, jē jaïsan karī tē taïsan pāï (lit. "Who as he does, he so obtains").

=== Demonstrative Pronouns ===
The proximate demonstrative pronouns ("this" or "those") of Modern Bhojpuri are given in the following table.

Forms		Singular	Plural
Nominative	Non Honorific	ī, haï	eknī kē, inhan kē, hekni kē, hinhan kē
Nominative	Formal	ī, haï	ī lōg
Nominative	Honorific	इहाँ के ihāṁ kē	इहाँ सभ / सभन / सभनी के ihaṁ sabh / sabhan / sabhani ke
Oblique	Non Honorific	ए, एह, हे ē, eh, hē	एकनी, इनहन, हेकनी, हिनहन eknī, inhan, hekni, hinhan
Oblique	Formal	इनका, इनकरा inakā, inakarā	ई लोग ī lōg
Oblique	Honorific	इहाँ ihāṁ	इहाँ सभ / सभन / सभनी के ihaṁ sabh / sabham / sabhani ke

The genitive form is ēkar, hēkar, inkar, hinkar. Sometimes the suffix -i is added to them and used a feminine. The remote form of demonstrative adjectives can be made by replacing i with u and e with o in the proximate form. Thus, eknī will becomes oknī and so on.

=== Relative Pronouns ===
Forms	Singular	Plural
Direct	jē, jawan, jaün, jinhī or sabh	Same as Singular along with जिन्हनि (jinhani) and जिन्हनि लोग (jinhani log)
Oblique	जे (jē), जवना (javanā), जउना (jaünā), जेह (jeh), जिन्हि (jinhi), जेकरा (jekrā), जिनकरा (jinkarā), जेहकरा (jehkarā)	Same as Singular along with जिन्हनि (jinhani) and जिन्हनि लोग (jinhani log)
Genitive	जेकर (jēkar), जेहकर (jehkar), जिनकर (jinkar)	Same as Singular along with जिन्हनि (jinhani) and जिन्हनि लोग (jinhani log)

The relative pronoun jē in Bhojpuri is the same as other Eastern Indo-Aryan languages.

Case		Demonstrative				Relative		Interrogative	
Case		3rd person							
Case		Proximal		Non-proximal		sg.	pl.	sg.	pl.
Case		sg.	pl.	sg.	pl.	sg.	pl.	sg.	pl.
Nominative	Informal	ī, haï	eknī ke, hēknī ke, inhan ke, hinhan ke, ī log (logan/sabh)	ū, haü	oknī ke, hoknī ke, unban ke, hunhan ke, ū log (logan/sabh)	jē, jawan, jaün	jeknī kē, jinhan kē,	kē, kewan, kawan, kaün	kē, kewan, kawan lōg, kaün
Nominative	Formal	ī, inhī, hinhī	eknī ke, hēknī ke, inhan ke, hinhan ke, ī log (logan/sabh)	ū, unhī, hunhī	ū log (logan, sabh)	jē, jawan, jaün	jē lōg, jinhan lōg	kē, kewan, kawan, kaün	kē, kewan, kawan lōg, kaün
Nominative	Honorific	ihāṃ kē	ihāṃ sabh (sabhan/sabhani ke)	uhāṃ kē	uhāṃ sabh (sabhan/sabhani ke)	jihāṃ kē	jihāṃ sabh (sabhani)	kē, kewan, kawan, kaün	kē, kewan, kawan lōg, kaün
Oblique	Informal	ē, eh, hē, ekrā, hekrā	eknī, heknī, inhani, hinhanī	ō, oh, ho, okrā, hokrā	okanī, hoknī, unhani	jē, jekrā, jeh, jawanā, jaünā	jeknī, jinhan	kē, keh, kawanā, kaünā, kewanā, kekrā, kehakarā	kē, keknī, kinhan
Oblique	Formal	in, inkarā, inkā, inhani ka	i log (logan)	un, unkā, unkarā,. hunkā, hunkarā	u log (logan)	jē, jeh, jawanā, jaünā, jin, jinkā, jinkarā	jē lōg, jawan lōg	kinkarā, kinkā	kinhan, kawan log
Oblique	Honorific	ihāṃ	ihāṃ (sabh/sabhan/sabhani)	uhāṃ	uhāṃ (sabh/sabhan/sabhani)	jihāṃ	jihāṃ sabh (sabhan/sabhani)	kihāṃ	
Genitive	Informal	ēkar, hēkar	eknī ke, heknī ke	ōkar, hōkar	oknī kē, hokni kē	jēkar, jehakar	jeknī ke	kēkar	keknī ke
Genitive	Formal	inkar, hinkar	i log (logan)	unkar, hunkar	u log (logan)	jinkar	je/jawan/jaün log ke	kinkar	kawan log
Genitive	Honorific	ihaṃ ke	ihāṃ sabh ke (sabhan/logan/log)	uhāṃ kē	uhāṃ sabh ke (sabhan/logan/log)	jihaṃ	jihāṃ sabh ke (sabhan/logan/log)		

=== Other Pronouns ===
- Keu, Kēhu and Kawano are used as animate forms of indefinite pronouns and kichu, kuchu, kichuo, kuchuo as inanimate forms.
- apanā and apne are used to show relative sense, nija is used in instrumental case.

== Adjectives ==
Like the nouns, adjectives also have short, long and redundant forms, e.g. baṛ, baṛkā, baṛkawā. Sometimes, the suffixes -han and -har are also used with adjectives, e.g. lām - lamhar and baṛ - baṛhan.

Adjectives do not agree in gender with the noun. Hence the adjective baṛ (big) is same for laïkā ("boy") and laïki ("girl"), just as in other Magadhan languages. In Bhojpuri, however, the long form with suffix /-ka/ and /-kī/ is gendered, thus baṛkā and baṛkī are used for masculine and feminine respectively.

=== Degree of Comparison ===
There are no inflexions for comparative and superlative forms. The words equivalent to "more" like besi, jiādā, dhēr and "less" like kam are used before the adjectives while comparing:

ई लइक ओकरा से ढेर सुन्नर बाटे
ī laïkā okarā se ḍhera sunnara bāṭe
This boy is fairer than that.

Sometime comparison is done using the numerals unaïs (nineteen) and bīs (twenty), where former is used for less and later for more.

ऊ लइका एकरा से उमिर मे तनि उनइस हवे
ū laīkā ekarā se umira me tani unaïsa hawe
The boy is a bit younger in age. (lit. That boy is slightly nineteen than this in age.

The superlative is expressed by adding sabh mē or sabh sē or sabh mē baṛhi kē or sabh se baṛhi kē (best of all) before the adjective, for example u laïka sabh mē nīk hawe (the boy is best of all).

== Verbs ==
Chaterji has classified Bhojpuri verbs into two categories viz. primary root and secondary root. The former one are those which are inherited from Old Indo-Aryan while the latter are causative, denominative or compounded. Like Bengali, Bhojpuri has two moods, indicative and imperative.

== History of Bhojpuri Grammars ==
The earliest mentions of some grammatical features of Bhojpuri can he found in Buchanan's report on Shahabad in 1812. A detailed grammatical sketch of Bhojpuri was first published by Beames in 1868. In 1877, J.R. Reid tried to give a picture of the Bhojpuri spoken in Azamgarh district. Greirson's Linguistic Survey of India Vol. V, Part II, published in 1903, contained a skeleton grammar of Bhojpuri with specimens.

Current Bhojpuri grammar which is widely used is Bhojpuri Bayakaran, written by Pt. Shivdas Ojha in 1915. He was a Bhojpuri scholar from Shahabad district of Bihar. It was later published by Bhojpuri Akademi, Patna.
