= Bhoj, India =

Bhoj
- Town
- Location in Karnataka, India Bhoj (India)
- Coordinates: 16°32′N 74°27′E
- Country: India
- State: Karnataka
- District: Belgaum district
- Talukas Hobli: Chikodi; Sadalga

Government
  - Type: Panchayat raj
  - Body: Gram panchayat

Languages
  - Official: Kannada
- Time zone: UTC+5:30 (IST)
- ISO 3166 code: IN-KA
- Vehicle registration: KA
- Website: karnataka.gov.in

Bhoj is a small town in Belagavi district in the Southern state of Karnataka, India.

The confluence of the rivers Vedaganga and Doodhganga occurs nearby, to the northwest of Bhoj. The Vedaganga River flows along the south and west sides, while the Doodhganga River flows from west to east.

== History ==
Bhoj is noted for its association with legendary Swamis, whose stories are well known among the local residents.

Approximately 500 to 600 years ago, Bhoj was home to Godman Mahant Swamiji. His samadhi (memorial) is currently located in the village.

Mahant Swamiji had a friendship with Bangal Saab Maharaj, who lived in the nearby village of Karadaga, approximately 2 kilometers away. They would meet to exchange views and express mutual respect for their spiritual beliefs.

The Doodhganga River, located between Bhoj and Karadaga, made it challenging for them to meet during the rainy season. However, despite these natural obstacles, Bangal Saab managed to cross the river by using a floating mat, allowing the two spiritual leaders to meet daily.

Bhoj is known as the home of the Jain Muni Shri 108 Pratham-Acharya Shantisagarji Maharaj.
