= Bhojpuri, Rajasthan =

Bhojpuri is a small village in Alwar district of Rajasthan in India. It is part of the National Capital Region. It is known for prehistoric havelis. Bhojpuri is 67.3 km far from its District Headquarter Alwar. It is 140 km far from its State Capital Jaipur.

== Geography ==
Bhojpuri is located at 27°57′46.09″N 76°28′35.59″E in northern part of Alwar district of Rajasthan at an elevation of 263m. Nearby villages are Hulmana (100 m), Beejwad Chouhan (2.5 km), Manethi (1 km), Jalawas (1.5 km), Vijay Nagar (2.5 km), Pholadpur (3 km).

== Location ==
Bhojpuri town is located in the National Capital Region, 100 km south of Delhi, 140 km north of state capital Jaipur, 67.3 km north of Alwar city, 28 km north of Behror, 25 km south of Rewari city, 45 km south of Dharuhera, 20 km west of Bhiwadi .

It is easily reached from NH8 (Delhi-Jaipur-Mumbai highway) via shahjahanpur or Neemrana.

== Demography ==
Mundawar was a village with population of under 1000 of which 481 are males while 404 are females as per 2011 census. According to Census 2011 the Bhojpuri village has higher literacy rate compared to other Rajasthan. In 2011, literacy rate of Bhojpuri village was 78.2% compared to 66.11% of Rajasthan. In Bhojpuri Male literacy stands at 91.5% while female literacy rate was 62%.
