= Bhojpuri nouns =

Bhojpuri nouns are a category of words in the Bhojpuri language. As in most other Indo-Aryan languages, Bhojpuri nouns are of either masculine or feminine gender. Every Bhojpuri noun has three forms viz. short, long and redundant.

The prototypical Bhojpuri noun is characterised by exhibiting certain properties. These properties are durability, complexity, concreteness, compactness and the quality of being individuative in association with their multiple features like size, shape, weight, colour and cultural usage.

== Semantics ==
Nouns of Bhojpuri tend to change their features in a slower fashion compared to the other word classes.

== Syntax ==
A noun is the head of a Bhojpuri noun phrase and occupies a major position in clauses. In a sentence, the noun phrase may take the position of subject, object (direct and indirect), nominal predicate, possessor, object complement and locative expression.

== Declension ==
The inflexion of the eight cases present in Old Indo-Aryan has not been preserved in Bhojpuri. Gender-specific declension paradigms are absent in Bhojpuri, as in other Magadhan languages.

=== Stem and its forms ===
The noun stem ends in either a vowel or a consonant, e.g. dōrā (thread), nōkar (servant). Nouns generally have three forms: the short, long and the redundant form. For example, for nōkar, the three forms are nōkar, nōkarwā and nokarawā, respectively. Nouns also have a fourth weak form. The weak form is the shortest form of a noun and generally ends in a short vowel or in a consonant. The weak form of nouns is rarely used in vernacular speech.

The long and redundant forms are used only with socially inferior and younger people and never with elders and superiors. The different forms of nouns are given in the following table:

Definition	Weak	Short	Long	Redundant
Horse	ghōṛ	ghōṛā	ghoṛwā	ghōrawā
Iron	lōh	lohā	lōhwā	lohawā

==== Rules for making long forms ====
1. If stem ends with -ā, wā is added to it.
2. If stem ends with ū, the vowel is shortened before the termination.
3. If stem ends with ī, yā is added to it.
4. If stem ends with a constant, -ā is added.

These examples are given in the following table:

Definition	Short	Long
King	rājā	rajwā
Barber	nāū	naūwā
Garderner	mālī	maliyā
Cobbler	camār	camarā

=== Gender ===
Gender, while present, is not an important aspect in the grammar of modern Bhojpuri and corresponds primarily to the natural sex of what the noun denotes. There are no strict affixes for the different genders. In modern Bhojpuri, adjectives are also not required to agree with the gender of the nouns they qualify, as they were in Old Bhojpuri, e.g.:

𑂞𑂥 𑂥𑂹𑂩𑂯𑂹𑂧𑂰 𑂣𑂴𑂓𑂪 𑂧𑂯𑂞𑂰𑂩𑂲, 𑂍𑂵 𑂞𑂷𑂩 𑂦𑂞𑂰𑂩 𑂍𑂵𑂍𑂩𑂲 𑂞𑂴 𑂢𑂰𑂩𑂲 taba brahmā pūchhala mahatārī, ke tora bhatāra kekarī tū nārī

— Kabir, Bijak, page. 27

Nouns which represent animate beings take the gender according to their natural sex. However, some nouns are always masculine or always feminine irrespective of the natural gender of a specific individual. For example, kaūā (crow) is always masculine and ciraī (bird) is always feminine.

=== Number ===
Plurals are created by affixing -an, -ani, -anh, -anhi, -nh, -nhi, -n or -ni. Plurals can also be made by adding words that represent plurality. Generally, these words are sabh (all) and lōg (people).

Definition	Singular Form	Plural Form
House	ghar	gharan
Horse	ghoṛā	ghoṛan
Boy	laīkā	laīkan/laīka sabh
King	rājā	rājā lōg

== Case Inflexions ==
Case relationships are represented with postpositions. The accusative, dative and genitive are marked by ke, the instrumental and ablative by sē and the locative by mē and par. The postposition lē is also used for the ablative in the Bhojpuri of Shahabad district.

=== Postpositional words ===
Some postpositional words in Bhojpuri are:

- āgā : before, in front of. Example: hini ka āge (in front of him)
- upar: on, upon
- ōr: towards, in the direction of
- karat: doing
- khātir or lā: for
- chāṛi: give up
- niyar or niyan: like or similar
