= Bhojpur, Raebareli =

Bhojpur
- Village
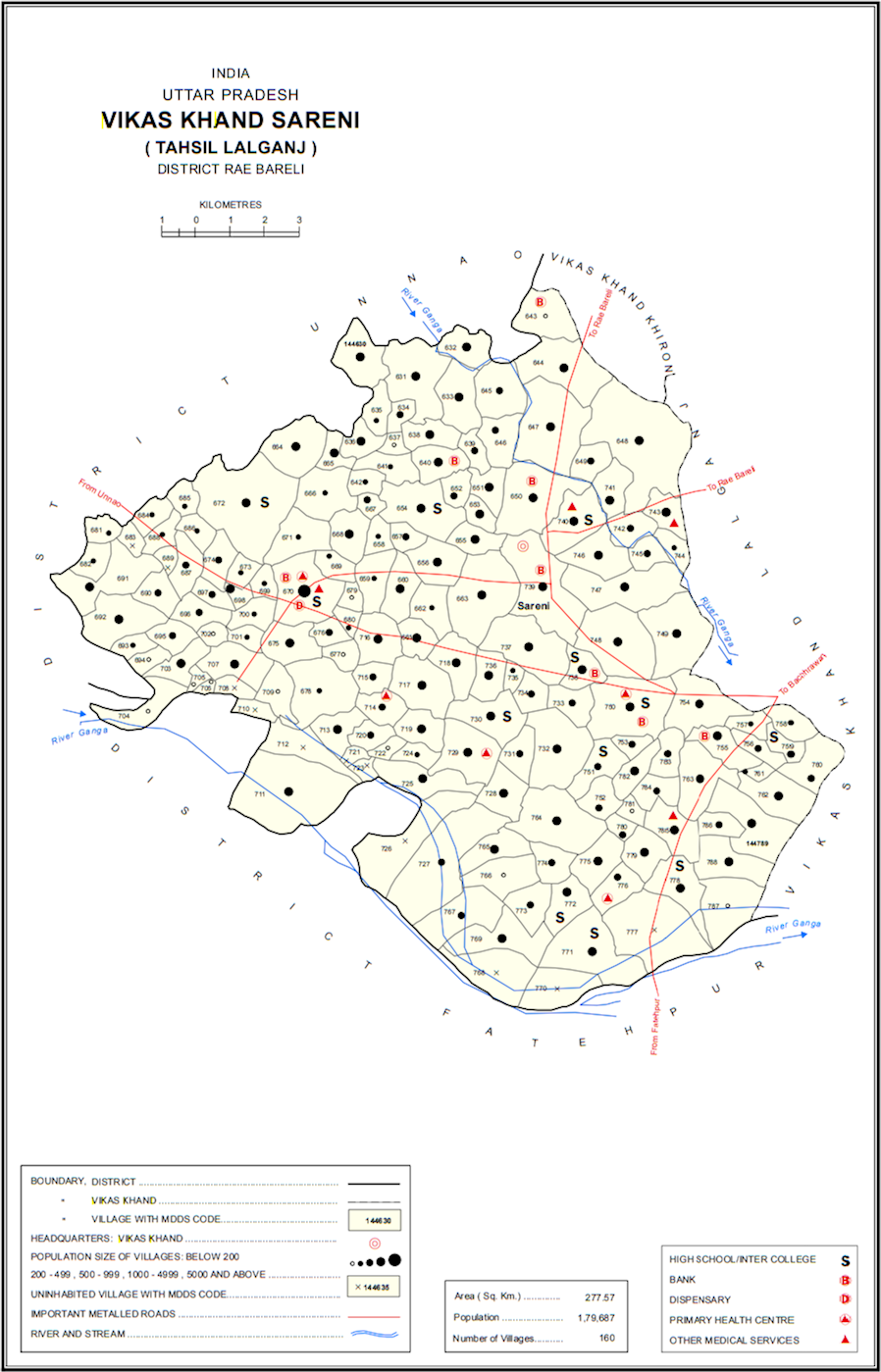
- Map showing Bhojpur (#670) in Sareni CD block

- Location in Uttar Pradesh, India
- Coordinates: 26.141422°N 80.753806°E
- Country: India
- State: Uttar Pradesh
- District: Raebareli

Area
  - Total: 4.749 km^{2} (1.834 sq mi)

Population (2011)
  - Total: 7,173
  - Density: 1,510/km^{2} (3,912/sq mi)

Languages
  - Official: Hindi
- Time zone: UTC+5:30 (IST)
- Vehicle registration: UP-35

Bhojpur is a village in Sareni block of Rae Bareli district, Uttar Pradesh, India. It is located 18 km from Lalganj, the tehsil headquarters. As of 2011, it has a population of 7,173 people, in 1,215 households. It has 2 primary schools and one primary health centre. The village does not host a permanent market or a weekly haat. Bhojpur is the headquarters of a nyaya panchayat, which also includes 16 other villages.

The 1951 census recorded Bhojpur as comprising 5 hamlets, with a population of 2,394 people (1,202 male and 1,192 female), in 497 households and 407 physical houses. The area of the village was given as 1,261 acres. 57 residents were literate, 38 male and 19 female. The village was listed as belonging to the pargana of Sareni and the thana of Sareni.

The 1961 census recorded Bhojpur as comprising 5 hamlets, with a total population of 2,786 people (1,356 male and 1,430 female), in 519 households and 445 physical houses. The area of the village was given as 1,261 acres and it had a post office at that point.

The 1981 census recorded Bhojpur as having a population of 4,081 people, in 700 households, and having an area of 510.32 hectares. The main staple foods were given as wheat and rice.

The 1991 census recorded Bhojpur as having a total population of 5,370 people (2,739 male and 2,631 female), in 868 households and 868 physical houses. The area of the village was listed as 475 hectares. Members of the 0-6 age group numbered 1,059, or 20% of the total; this group was 53% male (558) and 47% female (501). Members of scheduled castes made up 23% of the village's population, while no members of scheduled tribes were recorded. The literacy rate of the village was 40% (1,353 men and 796 women). 1,323 people were classified as main workers (1,244 men and 79 women), while 50 people were classified as marginal workers (7 men and 43 women); the remaining 3,997 residents were non-workers. The breakdown of main workers by employment category was as follows: 381 cultivators (i.e. people who owned or leased their own land); 410 agricultural labourers (i.e. people who worked someone else's land in return for payment); 5 workers in livestock, forestry, fishing, hunting, plantations, orchards, etc.; 0 in mining and quarrying; 29 household industry workers; 54 workers employed in other manufacturing, processing, service, and repair roles; 4 construction workers; 212 employed in trade and commerce; 6 employed in transport, storage, and communications; and 222 in other services.
