= Kudra =

Kudra Jahanabad
- town
- Location in Bihar, India
- Coordinates: 25.05°N 83.62°E
- Country: India
- State: Bihar
- District: Kaimur (Bhabua)

Area
  - Total: 5.50 km^{2} (2.12 sq mi)
- Elevation: 76 m (249 ft)

Population (2011)
  - Total: 30,986
  - Density: 5,630/km^{2} (14,600/sq mi)
- Demonym: Jahanabad

Languages
  - Official: Hindi
  - Regional: Bhojpuri
- Time zone: UTC+5:30 (IST)
- PIN: 821108
- Telephone code: 91-6187
- ISO 3166 code: IN-BR
- Vehicle registration: BR-45
- Website: www.kaimur.bih.nic.in

Kudra, formerly known as Jahanabad, is a town and corresponding community development block in Kaimur district in the state of Bihar, India. It is the third largest town in Kaimur district. It is situated about 18 km from District Headquarter Bhabua. As of 2011, the population of Kudra (aka Jahanabad) was 30986 . The railway station in Kudra is connected to all major railway routes.

== Geography ==
Kudra is located at 25.05°N 83.62°E. It has an average elevation of 76 metres (249 feet). Kudra is divided in 193 wards, 75 villages with 15 panchayats (Jehanabad, Bahera, Bhadaula, Chilbili, Derwan, Devrath Kala, Khurd, Ghataon, Meura Kharhana, Newras, Pachpokhari, Sakri, Salthuan, Sasna, Siswar). There is an ancient Kali mandir at Sakri and a stadium (Nishan Singh Stadium) near High School Jehanabad. Ramlila Maidan is near Kankali Mandir where all cultural activities are carried on. In the south, there is a river called Durgawati consisting of Nauchandi and Pathlaghat.

== Climate ==
Kudra's climate is very hot during the summer and slightly cold during the winter season. It is ideal to visit Kudra between September and December. January is the coldest month. During this time the mean minimum temperature is almost 4 degree Celsius. Temperature is at its pinnacle in the month of May when the mercury reaches almost 45 degree Celsius. Rain begins sometime in mid June and lasts till mid September. The district receives easterly winds from June to September, and from October to May wind direction reverses. It receives optimum rainfall in the months of July and August. Sometimes winter rains occur in January.

== Administration ==
Kudra block comes under Mohania sub-division. It is divided in 193 wards, 75 villages with 15 panchayats (Jehanabad, Bahera, Bhadaula, Chilbili, Derwan, Devrath Kala, Khurd, Ghataon, Meura Kharhana, Newras, Pachpokhari, Sakri, Salthuan, Sasna, Siswar). Kudra is a part of the Mohania Vidhan Sabha constituency and Sasaram Lok Sabha constituency.

== Demographics ==
As of 2011 India census, Kudra had a population of 17,076. Males constitute 54% of the population and females 46%. Kudra has an average literacy rate of 66%, higher than the national average of 59.5%.

The mother tongue of almost all the people in Kudra is Bhojpuri. The main occupation of most of the people is agriculture.

== Economy ==
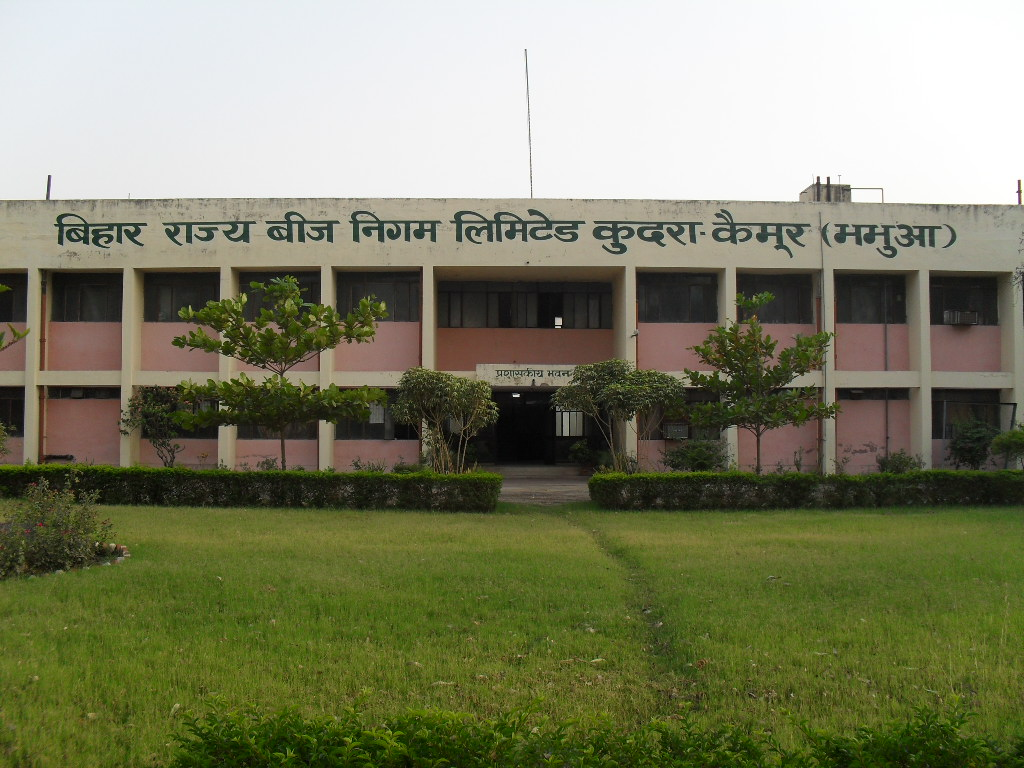
Asia's largest seed storage house

Kudra's economy is mainly driven by agriculture and related industries like rice polishing. The region is also known as Dhan Ka Katora, meaning "a bowl of rice".Canal irrigation system is also very prominent in this area. Because of the fertile land around the town it is a local trading center for food grains, agricultural products, and agricultural equipment. The rice grown near Kudra is sold in the markets of Kolkata and New Delhi. Kudra is also known as Industrial city of Kaimur because 10 big rice mills and 400 mini rice mills (automatic) operates at Lalapur, Sakri and Kudra. Jhunjhunwala group is also investing in Kudra and has opened a factory.

=== Bihar Rajya Bij Nigam ===
In order to bring about complete self-sufficiency and self-reliance to meet the full active demand of quality seeds of high yielding varieties to the farmers of the State at reasonable price, the Bihar Rajya Bij Nigam, a public Limited Company, was incorporated on 18 July 1978 under the Second National Seed Project established under the Companies Act 1956 by the Govt. of India through the financial assistance of World Bank. There are three more regional offices located at Hajipur (Vaishali), Begusarai and Bhagalpur.

== Places ==
Ramlila Maidan

It is a site where multipurpose activities are conducted. People attend this place in large numbers to witness Ramlila, a play based on the epic Ramayana which is followed by the burning of Ravana's giant effigy and the celebration of Dushahra. The vast ground also holds activities such as cricket matches, political rallies and trade fairs.

Kali Mandir

It is one of the historical temples existing in Kudra town. People visit this temple in large numbers to offer their prayers to Goddess Durga.

Chaturbhuji Dham

This temple is situated at Dumri village which is 17.2 km away from Kudra town in north direction. The statue of the temple was found around 100 years ago while ploughing the land, till then it was being worshipped by Hindu religion people. The specialty of statue is that made of black single stone of Lord Vishnu. This statue replicates the sleeping mudra of Lord Vishnu and Goddess Lakshmi is setting and pressing his feet. People visit this temple in large numbers to offer their prayers to Lord Vishnu and Goddess Lakshmi.

- Kaliasthan, Ramlila Maidan
- Maa Kankali, Ramlila Maidan
- Badka Shivala, Ramlila Maidan
- Chotka Shivala, Kudra Bazar
- Ram Janki & Maa Annpurna Mandir
- Gurudwara, G.T. Road, Kudra
- Church, Chilbili, G.T. Road, Kudra
- Mosque, Kudra Bazar

== Sports ==
Cricket is the most popular sport in Kudra although football and other sports tournaments are also organised. Nishan Singh Stadium near High School Jehanabad attracts visitors and people more in number whenever any cricket match is organized.

== Transport ==
Kudra is well connected to all major parts of country by both road and railways. It is one of the best accessible places in Bihar due to its position as it geographically lies between Golden Quadrilateral highway systems and Grand Chord railway line. Thus Kudra is easily accessible from Delhi and Kolkata by both road and railways.

Nearest air connectivity available from Kudra is through Varanasi Airport.

=== Road ===
Four-lane (Being Converted into 6 lanes) National Highway 19 (Grand Trunk Road, old NH 2) crosses through the heart of city. It Connects Kudra to National Capital Delhi (888 km), Kolkata (580 km), Varanasi(84 km) and Allahabad(220 km).Daily busses are available from Kudra to Varanasi through G.T. Road. The journey is of 2 hours.

NH 319 (old NH 30) originates from Mohania (25 km west on G.T. Road) and connect this city with the state capital Patna via Arrah through a journey of 4 hours. The town is 200 km from Patna.

Kudra is connected to its district headquarters Bhabua via State Highway 67. It is located 16 km south of Kudra. Kudra is the primary location for commuting of the people of Bhabua as it enjoys better connectivity to the rest of country.

The main mode of local transportation are buses operated by both the state government and private owners. The private buses are more frequent and easily available and connect to most of the local towns and bazaars. Small Pick-up vans are also used as a mode of local transportation from Kudra to its nearby villages.

=== Rail ===
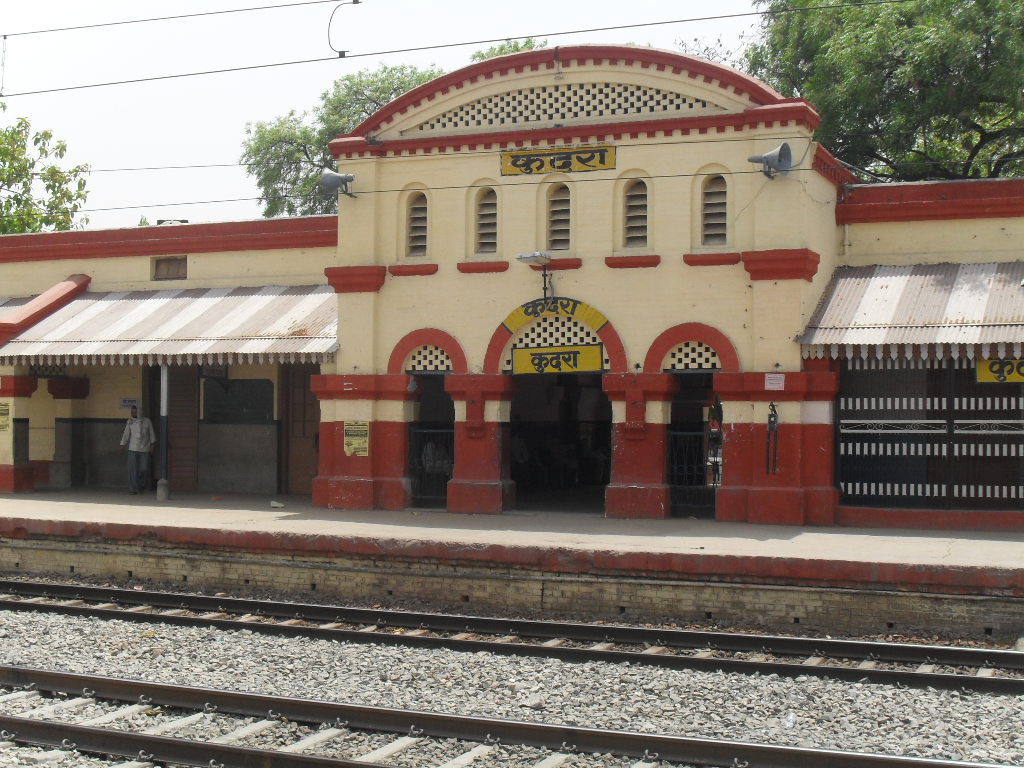
Kudra is the Railway Station on the Howrah-New Delhi Grand Chord.

Kudra is well connected by rail with the major Indian cities like New Delhi, Kolkata, Patna, Kanpur, Allahabad, Ranchi, Gaya, Ajmer, Dehradoon, Dhanbad, Ludhiana and Varanasi. Kudra Railway Station lies on Gaya-Mughalsarai Section of Howrah-New Delhi Grand Chord Railway line. Following list contain all major trains stopping on Kudra Railway Station. The station code is 'KTQ'.

The Train list:

Train Number	Train Name	Origin	Destination	Frequency (inbound/outbound)
2397/98	Mahabodhi Express	Gaya	New Delhi	Daily
3151/52	Kolkata-Jammutawi Exp	Kolkata	Jammutawi	Daily
3307/08	Dhanbad-Ludhiana Exp	Dhanbad	Firozpur	Daily
5109/10	Budh Poornima Exp	Varanasi	Rajgir	Daily
8611/12	Intercity Exp	Varanasi	Ranchi	4 days
8631/32	Garib Nwaz Exp	Ranchi	Ajmer	2 days
8311/12	Samabalpur Varanasi Exp	Sambalpur	Varanasi	2 days
3009/10	Dehradoon Exp	Howrah	Dehradoon	Daily
3243/44	Intercity Exp (via) Gaya	Bhabua Road	Patna	Daily
3249/50	Intercity Exp (via) Ara	Bhabua Road	Patna	Daily

=== Air ===
Lal Bahadur Shastri International Airport, Varanasi commonly known as Babatpur Airport is the nearest airport, located at a distance of 113 km from Kudra. Indian carriers including Air India, Jet Airways, Kingfisher Airlines, Spicejet, and international carriers like Air India, Thai Airways International, Korean Air and Naaz Airlines operate from here. Daily flights to Delhi, Mumbai and Kolkata are available from here.

== Education ==
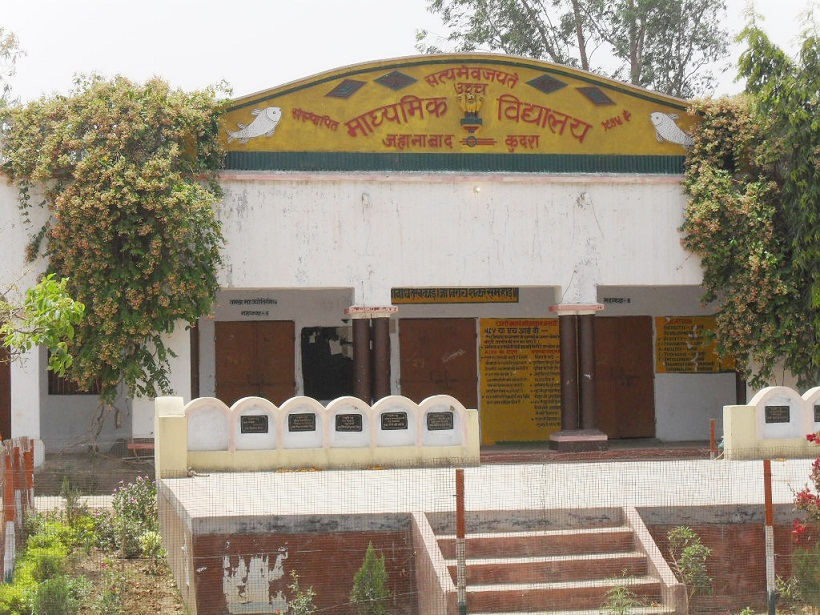
High School Kudra

Kudra still lags behind in field of basic education. Bihar has the lowest rate of literacy in India, and Kudra shares this trend. However average literacy rate of Kudra is higher than that of Bihar. Due to the lack of sources of better education, students often choose to migrate to other cities like Ranchi, Patna and Varanasi in search of better options. However the situation is improving.

Colleges

The town has limited options for higher education.Following are the government colleges in Kudra:

- Jagdeo Memorial College
- Parmeshwarnand Mahila College

Schools

- St. Joseph School, Ramlila Maidan
- Saraswati Sishu Mandir
- Dr.Ambedkar Aavasiye 10+2 School
- St. John Public School
- Paradise Children's Academy Lalapur Kudra
- Heaven Garden
- SBM Public School
- Modern Public (10+2) School, Lalapur
- Bal Pratiyogita Niketan, Sakri

== Villages ==
Kudra block contains the following 159 villages:

Village name	Total land area (hectares)	Population (in 2011)
Mohanpur	349	2,115
Salthua	894	3,540
Sabdalpur	91	630
Salthua Bahuara	103	579
Bajarha	166	941
Sarmanpur	57	235
Ratti Chak	29	486
Harpur	87	0
Silaundha	151	1,093
Bishunpura	103	1,026
Dangri	93	1,063
Danrori	106	738
Sasna	261	2,373
Jagdishpur	122	1,480
Bamhanganwan	99	786
Kaithia	124	507
Jagatpura	37	0
Ghateyan	161	763
Bhelma	139	1,474
Patakpura	66	0
Jalkhoria	87	730
Kharahna	364	2,385
Manpur	31	0
Bhataulia	77	918
Banrughat	138	396
Gayghat	110	550
Sarodih	74	176
Dewasdehra	107	791
Chhatauna	88	431
Pachara	59	553
Laravandehra	59	0
Basantpur	45	313
Ojhaulia	110	1,054
Taruhan	61.1	143
Hasanpura	91	350
Burahar	150	149
Turki	257	2,515
Dumri	185	967
Bastalwa	128	627
Pipra	191	1,022
Kandehra	191	1,436
Phulli	263	2,152
Basahi	457	1,990
Saraya	129	650
Barheta	115	0
Chanda	46.5	21
Siswar	181	1,771
Bhairwa	76	524
Semaria	68	0
Puraini	180	897
Amiaura	96	581
Chaubepur	153	0
Ghari	107	1,082
Mohammadpur	116	0
Bhainslot	30	0
Rampur	54	0
Sariawan	102	1,235
Sahpur	92	0
Sonbarsa	132	961
Shekhapur	41	0
Dhaturha	38	87
Bahuara	62	1,750
Maudehra	35	0
Nataya	425	2,236
Kakrahi	101	830
Ajgara	157	1,739
Bhaisadih	64	0
Khalsapur	120	0
Ajgari	76	208
Auraiya	167	1,075
Nado Khar	129	510
Sonawan	150	1,232
Barna	119	583
Ghatawan	433	9,997
Bahera	314	3,050
Bhadaula	184	2,908
Khanethi	304	1,086
Dubaulia	108	0
Gangvalia	202	2,769
Itahi	137.2	533
Baina	248	1,772
Kewrhi	367	3,092
Kahua	43	92
Basawanpur	35	59
Bhunrwa	42	1,059
Masudnapur	42	0
Jaruha	81	761
Nimia	118	670
Likhiya	77	0
Gajirhan	111	363
Kishunpura	87	0
Asraulia	97	466
Deorarh	308	3,963
Nasej	176	2,928
Patti	100	390
Babhanganwan	28	955
Ahraulia	78	284
Patkhaulia	92	764
Amirtha	199	2,030
Nathopur	169	936
Bhargawan	112	1,388
Chilbili	350	2,427
Karman	266	2,975
Bajarkona	109	505
Pathkhaulia	38	0
Gajrarhi	140	605
Jahanabad (block headquarters)	550	17,076
Chakia	27	2,446
Sakri	257.8	6,442
Bhainsaula	228	2,286
Neoras	349	4,440
Khaira	121	79
Dihra	301	2,208
Golaudih	217	1,122
Dusadhi Chak	48	56
Daindih	161	0
Tarhani	46.5	409
Hardaspur	61	526
Bagra	89	134
Pachpokhri	291	1,872
Chanwakh	145	702
Gurra	129.9	716
Belbhadra	77	110
Mokaram	87	1,202
Munjia	140	1,390
Chanrui	220	1,110
Dhanta	57	1
Bishunathpur	52	120
Biro	62	438
Chhotka Kajhar	123	315
Shahpur	72	444
Kadai	117.4	268
Rampur	163	2,207
Meura	259	2,154
Abdalpur	22	0
Chhotka Nimdihra	112	532
Paunra	93	386
Derwan	161.9	1,482
Deokali	82	603
Deoraha	85	74
Inaulia	52.6	0
Gokhulpur	51	291
Dhanarhi	105	1,006
Barka Nimdihra	37.6	1,238
Gora	106	341
Jamunipur	63	280
Karanpura	26	201
Sarmanpur	38	0
Sahajpura	34	398
Jajara	46	0
Chaukhara	32	442
Orgain	63	0
Bhatauli	40	541
Saidpur	25	60
Khalopur	36	0
Parsotimpur	26	64
Singhsaira	42	106
Khalopur	43	35
Baruar	60	506
